= Archduke Leopold of Austria (1823–1898) =

Austrian general and admiral

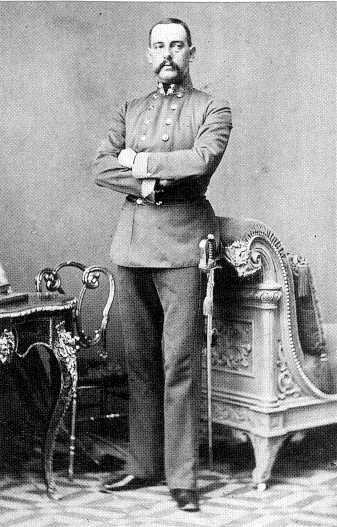
- Archduke Leopold, 1855–1865
- Born: 6 June 1823; Milan, Lombardy–Venetia
- Died: 24 May 1898 (aged 74); Hörnstein, Austria-Hungary
Names
- Leopold Ludwig Maria Franz Julius Estorgius Gerhard
- House: Habsburg-Lorraine
- Father: Archduke Rainer of Austria
- Mother: Princess Elisabeth of Savoy

Archduke Leopold Ludwig Maria Franz Julius Estorgius Gerhard of Austria (6 June 1823 – 24 May 1898) was an Austrian general and admiral.

== Life ==
Archduke Leopold was the eldest son of Archduke Rainer of Austria and Princess Elisabeth of Savoy and a grandson of Leopold II, Holy Roman Emperor. Leopold was born in 1823 in Milan, where his father served as Viceroy of Lombardy-Venetia from 1818 to 1848. Leopold's younger brother, also called Rainer, served as Austrian minister president from 1859 to 1861. Leopold followed his father in a military career, attaining the rank of Feldmarschall-leutnant (lieutenant general) in the Austrian Army.

Monarchical styles of Archduke Leopold of Austria
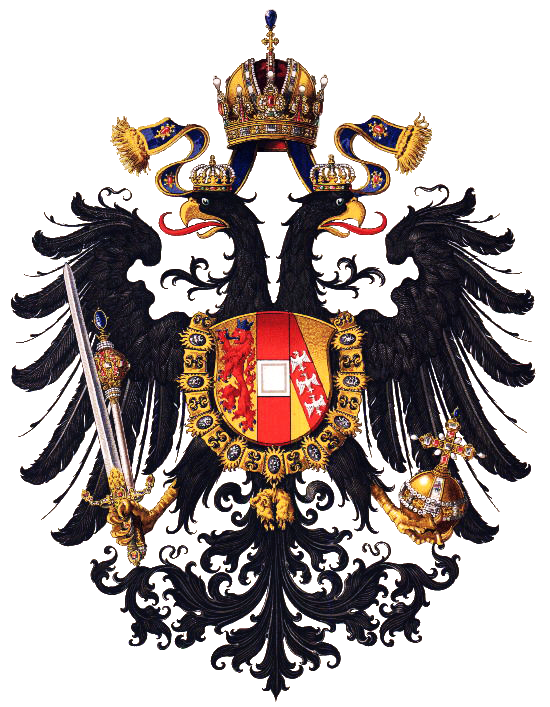
- Reference style: His Imperial and Royal Highness
- Spoken style: Your Imperial and Royal Highness

When Archduke Ferdinand Maximilian was preparing to accept the throne of Mexico in March 1864, Emperor Franz Joseph I sent Leopold to Miramar to induce Maximilian to sign the Act of Renunciation. The two cousins had never been on friendly terms, and Maximilian viewed Leopold as one of the archdukes who would benefit from the renunciation of his hereditary rights in Austria. Maximilian delayed signing the 'Family Compact', as it was called, until the visit of Franz Josef to Miramar on 9 April 1864.

Austro-Hungarian Naval Ensign

Undoubtedly to Maximilian's chagrin and irritation, Leopold was promoted to the rank of Viceadmiral in the Austro-Hungarian Navy and acted as Inspector General of the Marines and the fleet from 1865 up till 25 February 1868.

During the Austro-Prussian War, Leopold was given command of the Austrian VIII Corps. According to Geoffrey Wawro the Archduke was an incompetent princely commander who during the Battle of Skalitz, where his corps was severely mauled by the Prussian V Corps under Karl Friedrich von Steinmetz, didn't give a single order. Before the Battle of Königgrätz the Archduke was replaced as corps commander by General Weber.

Leopold never married, and after stepping down as head of the Navy he faded into obscurity. He died at Hörnstein on 24 May 1898.

== Ancestry ==
Ancestors of Archduke Leopold of Austria (1823–1898)

8. Francis I, Holy Roman Emperor
4. Leopold II, Holy Roman Emperor
9. Maria Theresa of Austria
2. Archduke Rainer of Austria
10. Charles III of Spain
5. Infanta Maria Luisa of Spain
11. Princess Maria Amalia of Saxony
1. Archduke Leopold of Austria
12. Victor Amadeus II, Prince of Carignano
6. Charles Emmanuel, Prince of Carignano
13. Princess Joséphine of Lorraine
3. Princess Elisabeth of Savoy
14. Charles, Duke of Courland
7. Princess Maria Christina of Saxony
15. Countess Franciszka Krasińska
