= Maria Pia of Savoy =

Queen of Portugal from 1862 to 1889

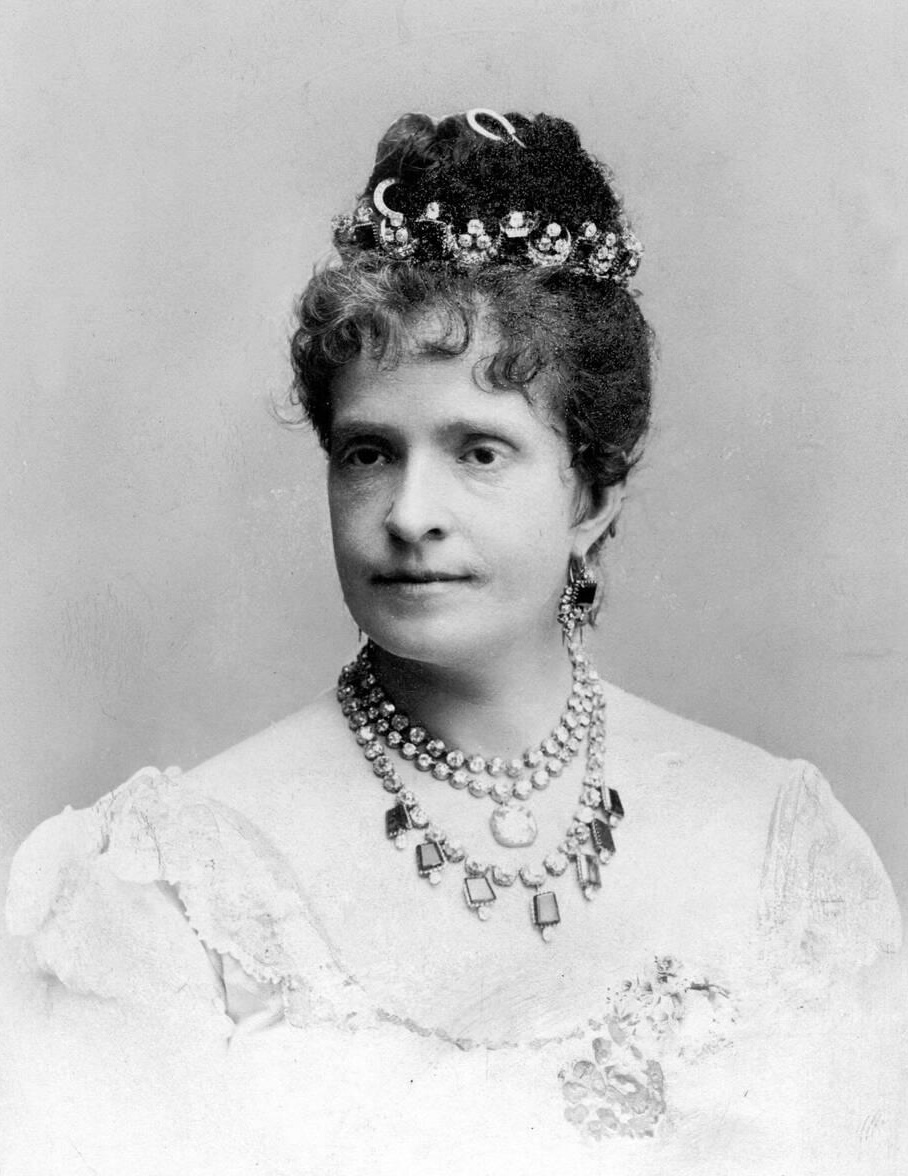
- Formal portrait, 1903

Queen consort of Portugal
- Tenure: 6 October 1862 – 19 October 1889
- Born: 16 October 1847; Royal Palace, Turin, Sardinia
- Died: 5 July 1911 (aged 63); Stupinigi Palace, Nichelino, Italy
- Burial: Royal Basilica, Turin
- Spouse: Luís I of Portugal (m. 1862; died 1889)
- Issue: Carlos I of Portugal; Infante Afonso, Duke of Porto
Names
- Maria Pia di Savoia
- House: Savoy (By birth); Braganza (By marriage)
- Father: Victor Emmanuel II of Italy
- Mother: Adelaide of Austria

Dona Maria Pia (16 October 1847 – 5 July 1911) was by birth an Italian princess of the House of Savoy and by marriage Queen of Portugal as the wife of King Luís I of Portugal. On the day of her baptism, Pope Pius IX, her godfather, gave her a Golden Rose. Maria Pia was married to Luís on 6 October 1862 in Lisbon. She was the grand mistress of the Order of Saint Isabel. She was the third queen of the House of Savoy on the Portuguese throne after Mafalda and Marie-Françoise of Savoy-Nemours.

== Early life ==
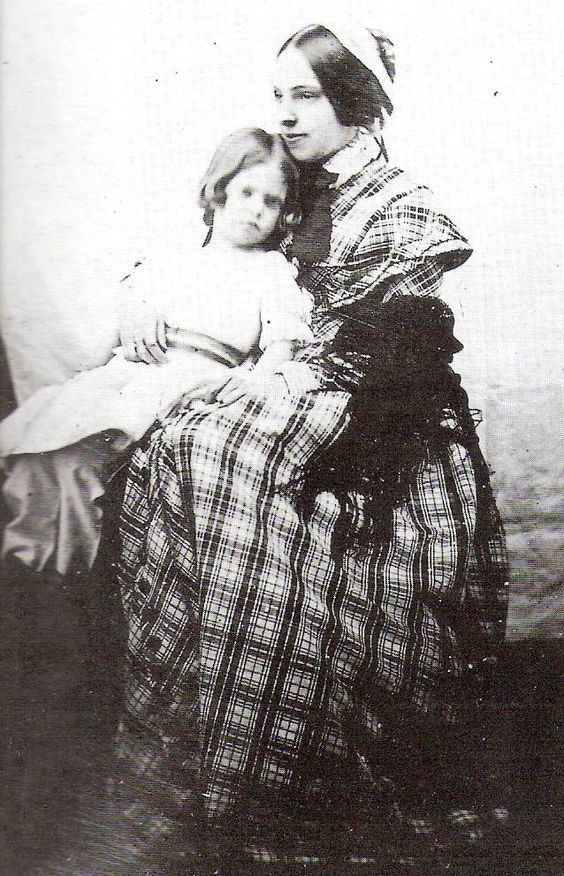
Maria Pia as a child with her mother, Queen Adelaide, c. 1850-1855

Maria Pia was born on 16 October 1847 in Turin, the youngest daughter of Victor Emmanuel II, the first King of Italy, by his wife Adelaide of Austria. Her godfather was Pope Pius IX, represented by proxy by the Papal nuncio, taking from him the name Pia. Her sister Maria Clotilde was the "princesse Napoléon" as the wife of Napoléon Joseph Charles Paul Bonaparte, and her brothers were King Umberto I of Italy and King Amadeo of Spain. Additionally, she had paternal half-siblings born out of wedlock who were never recognized as royalty despite their rich heritage.

Maria Pia married King Luís I of Portugal on 6 October 1862 at the age of 14 in the São Domingos Church in Lisbon, therefore she instantly became Queen consort of Portugal. A proxy wedding took place about a week before, on 27 September 1862, with her cousin Prince Eugene of Savoy taking the role of the groom. On the 29th, Maria boarded a ship at Genoa to visit her new homeland. The ship sailed into Lisbon on 5 October. Obviously Maria was smitten with Luís, as she later wrote "I like him more than his picture."

One year after the wedding, at age 15, Maria Pia gave birth to her first son and heir, Carlos, Duke of Braganza. Despite her young age, she proved to be a wonderful mother. She wrote "my little Charles is good. Oh, it is such a great fortune to be a mother. My little one is white and pink with the large blue eyes of his father. It seems that he has already six months instead of a few weeks. He is always, always with me!" In 1865, she had another son, Afonso, Duke of Porto. Soon after her second pregnancy, she experienced postpartum depression. In the end of 1866, Maria Pia had a miscarriage or stillborn child, which is involved in mystery as the Royal House hadn't announced formally the pregnancy. After that birth Maria Pia never became pregnant again, much to her sadness, as she desperately wanted a princess.

Despite her health problems both physical and mental, the queen was known to romp around with her sons and help with their studies, sometimes even studying alongside them.

== Queen consort ==
As Queen, Maria Pia was considered by some as extravagant, but far more for her many charitable works in aid of the Portuguese people. She was known by the Portuguese people as an "angel of charity" and "mother of the poor" for her compassion and work on social causes. At a masquerade ball in 1865, she changed her costume three times. When the Portuguese parliament discussed her expenses, she replied saying "if you want a Queen, you have to pay for her." As Queen, she was largely responsible for the interiors of the Ajuda Royal Palace in Lisbon, still used to this day for banquets during state visits by foreign heads of state.

Maria Pia did not involve herself in politics, but in a conflict with João Carlos Saldanha de Oliveira Daun, 1st Duke of Saldanha, in 1870, she stated: "If I were the king, I would have you shot!" Over the years, Luís began to indulge in several extramarital affairs. Despite her husband's apparent wandering eyes, Maria Pia remained faithful to her husband, but her husband's infidelity caused her a great deal of depression. It is speculated that she too had an affair with Tomás de Sousa Rosa but this was never confirmed, and may have just been some mean-spirited gossip most likely out of the mouth of Infanta Antónia of Portugal, her sister-in-law. The rumors got around to the queen and she responded indignantly "They can talk until they explode."

Maria Pia and Antónia both disliked each other. This hatred grew to the point where Antónia would refer to the penultimate queen of Portugal as 'x' in her letters to Luís. Antónia strongly believed that Maria Pia was having an affair and urged Luís to pursue a divorce, which was quite a double-standard as she was well aware of Luís' affairs. Maria Pia also maintained a rocky relationship with her father-in-law Ferdinand II of Portugal, disapproving of his morganatic marriage to an opera singer.

Her son Carlos and his wife, Amélie, had a son named Luís Filipe, who was very close to his grandmother. Tragically they also conceived a premature daughter named Maria Ana who lived for only a few hours. She expressed her sympathy, describing her lost granddaughter as "Very small, but perfect and beautiful, with well-defined features."

King Luís died on 19 October 1889 and Maria Pia became queen dowager. She remained very active and continued with her social projects while holding a dominating position at court. She served as regent during the absence of the king and queen abroad. The queen dowager was devastated after the assassination of her son King Carlos I of Portugal and grandson Crown Prince Luís Filipe, Duke of Braganza, on 1 February 1908 on the Praça do Comércio in Lisbon. During her last years in Portugal, she withdrew from the public eye. She was deeply saddened when her remaining grandson, King Manuel II of Portugal, was deposed by the 5 October 1910 Revolution.

Due to the 1910 coup that deposed Maria Pia's grandson, Manuel II, and established the republic in Portugal, the whole Portuguese royal family was exiled. King Manuel and Queen Amélie went to England, while Maria Pia and Infante Afonso went to her native Italy. She died there on 5 July the following year, in Stupinigi, and was interred in the Basilica of Superga.

== Gallery ==
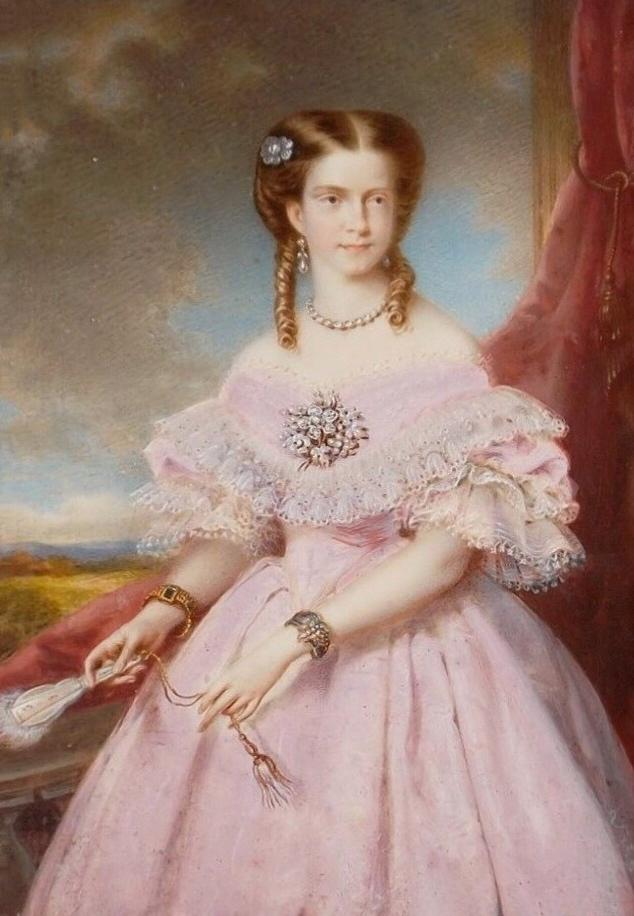
Portrait of Maria Pia, by Luigi Gandolfi (1863)

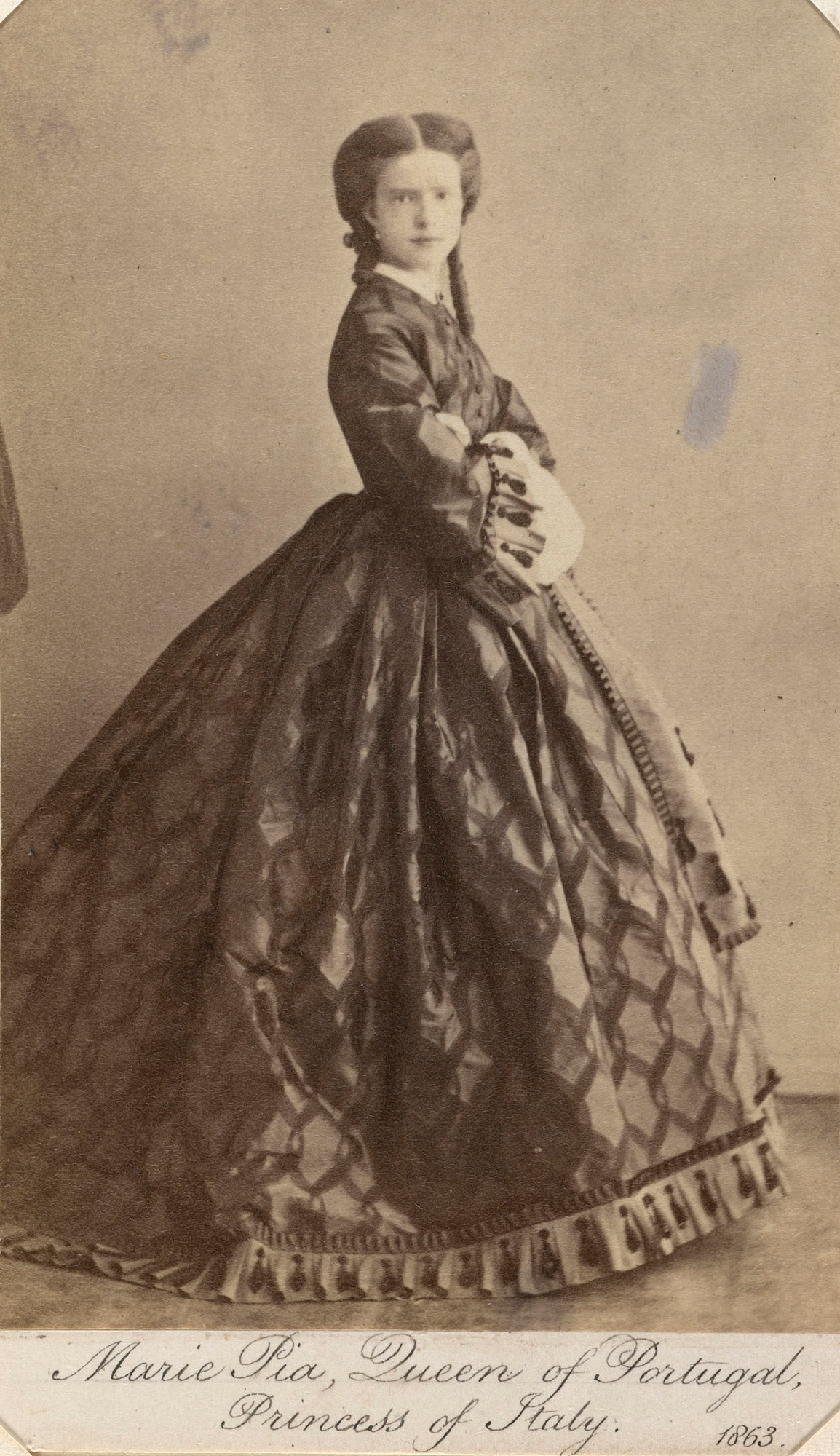
Photograph of Maria Pia as a teenager (1863)

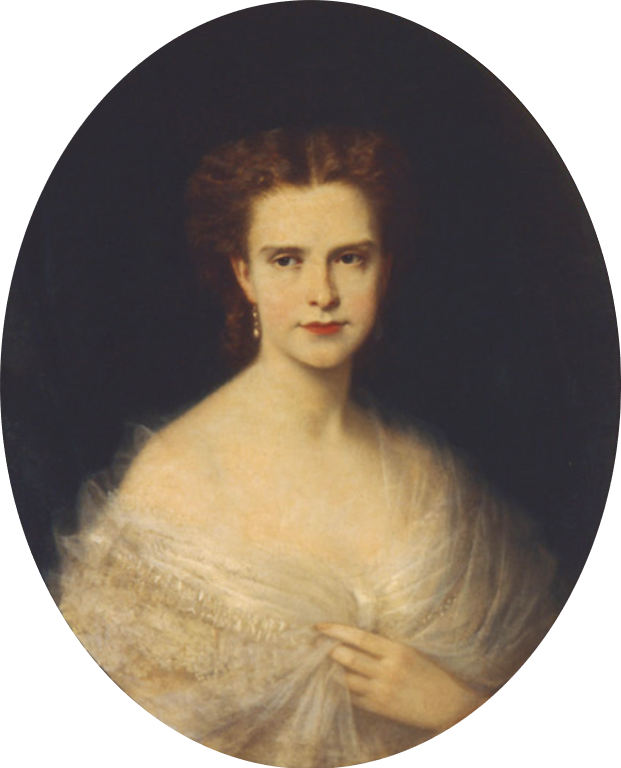
Portrait of Maria Pia, by Michele Gordigiani (1865), Palace of Ajuda

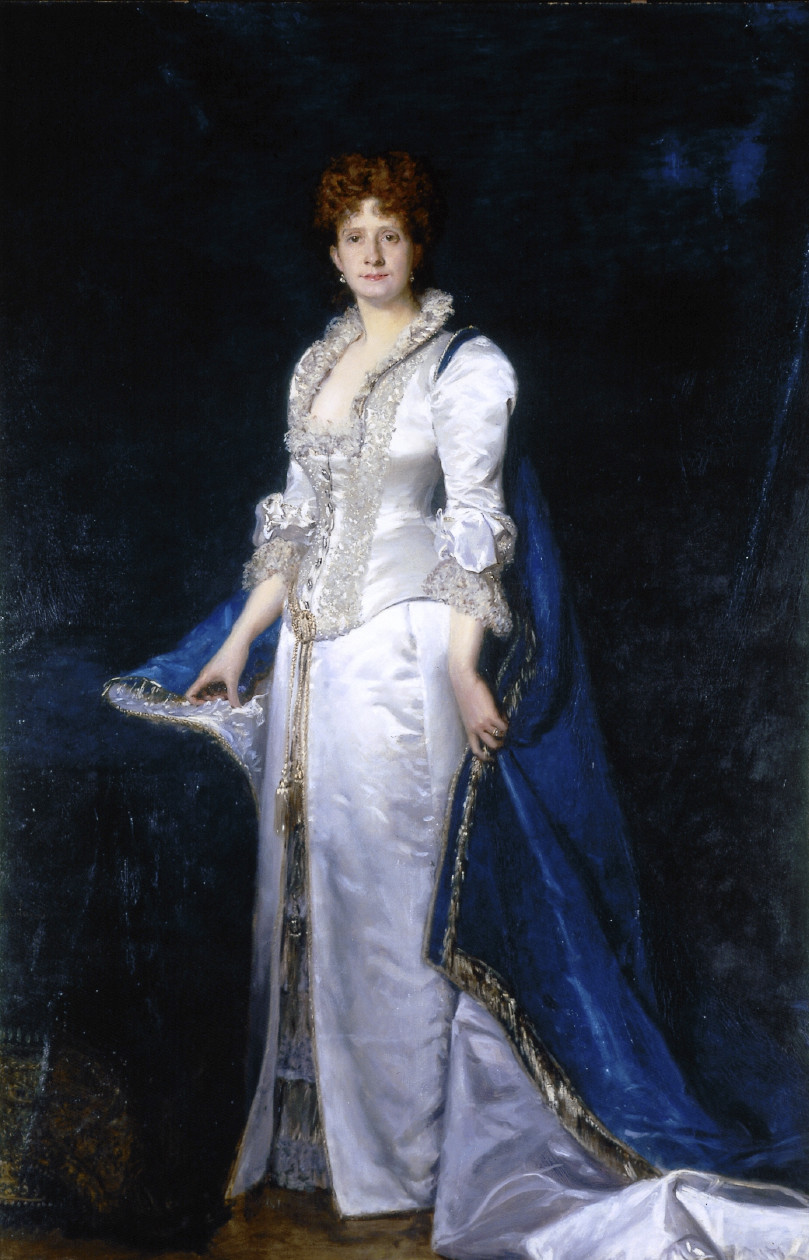
Portrait of Maria Pia, by Carolus Duran (1880), Palace of Ajuda

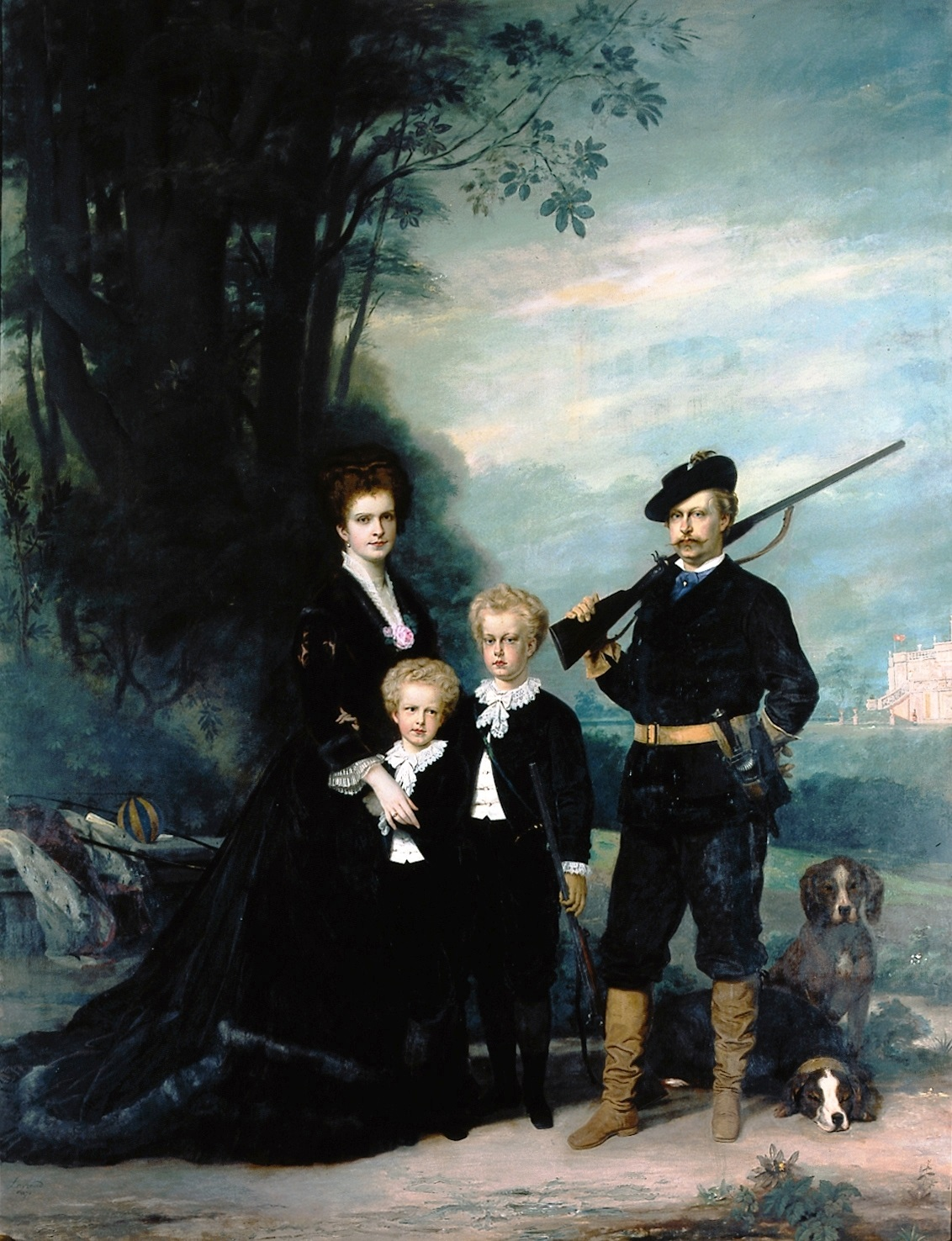
The royal family of Portugal, by Joseph Layraud (1876)

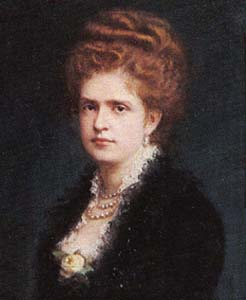
Portrait of Maria Pia, by Joseph Layraud

== Issue ==
Name	Birth	Death	Notes
Dom Carlos, Prince Royal of Portugal	28 September 1863	1 February 1908	Who succeeded his father as Carlos I, King of Portugal, murdered in 1908 by the Carbonária.
Dom Afonso, Prince Royal of Portugal	31 July 1865	21 February 1920	Infante of Portugal, Duke of Porto, Viceroy of Portuguese India, and after 1908 Prince Royal.

== Ancestry ==
Ancestors of Maria Pia of Savoy

8. Charles Emmanuel, Prince of Carignano
4. Charles Albert of Sardinia
9. Princess Maria Christina of Saxony
2. Victor Emmanuel II of Italy
10. Ferdinand III, Grand Duke of Tuscany
5. Archduchess Maria Theresa of Austria
11. Princess Luisa of Naples and Sicily
1. Maria Pia of Savoy
12. Leopold II, Holy Roman Emperor
6. Archduke Rainer of Austria
13. Infanta Maria Louisa of Spain
3. Archduchess Adelaide of Austria
14. Charles Emmanuel, Prince of Carignano (= 8)
7. Princess Elisabeth of Savoy
15. Princess Maria Christina of Saxony (= 9)

Maria Pia of Savoy House of Savoy Born: 16 October 1847 Died: 5 July 1911
Portuguese royalty
Preceded by Stephanie of Hohenzollern-Sigmaringen	Queen consort of Portugal; 6 October 1862 – 19 October 1889	Succeeded by Amélie of Orléans
