= Archduke Ernest of Austria (1824–1899) =

Austrian archduke (1824–1899)

Archduke Ernest
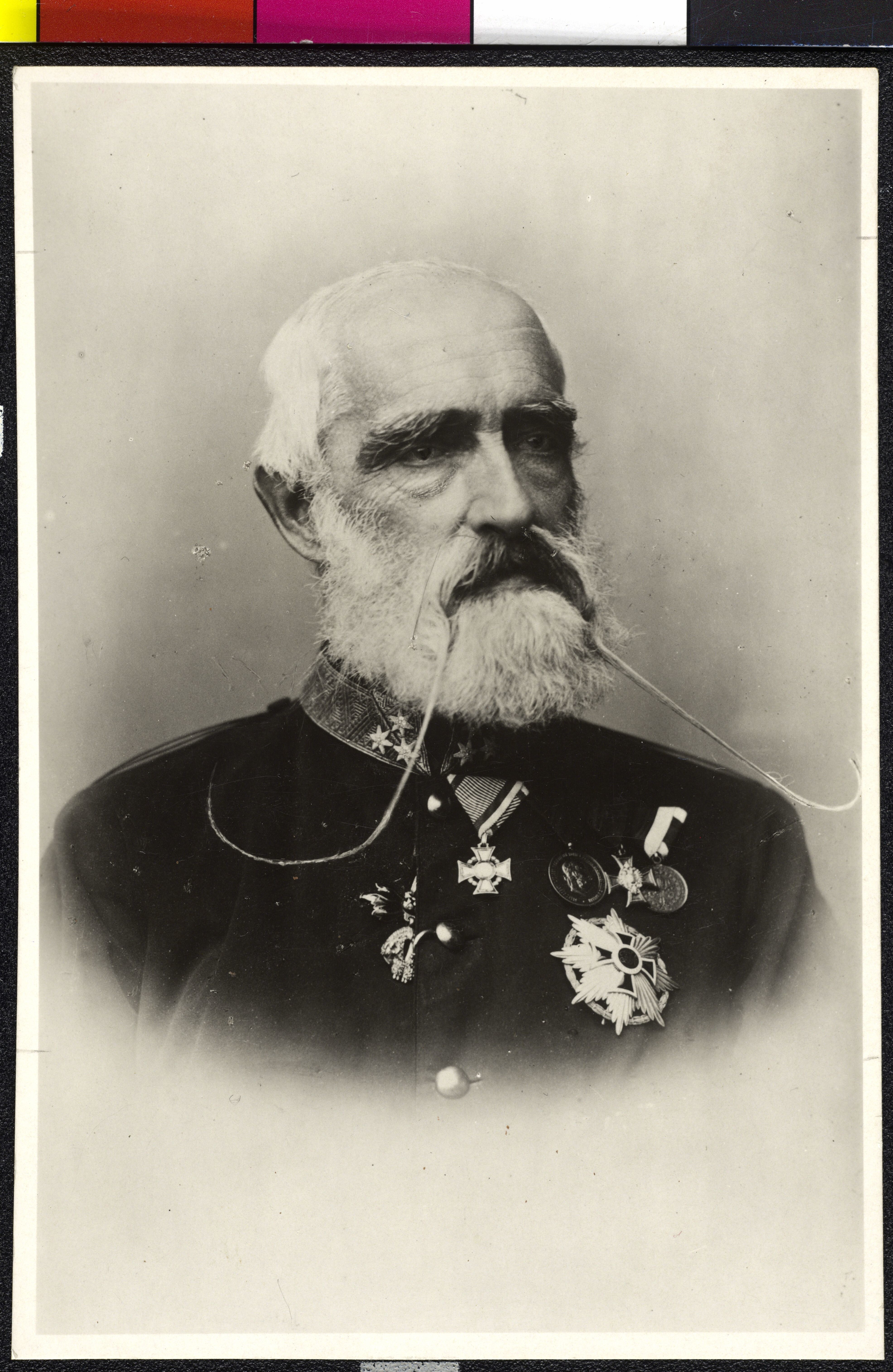
- Archduke Ernst c. 1889
- Born: 8 August 1824; Milan, Lombardy–Venetia
- Died: 4 April 1899 (aged 74); Arco, Italy
- Spouse: Laura Skublics de Velike et Bessenyö (m. 1858; died 1865)
- Issue: Laura Ernestine von Wallburg; Ernst Heinrich Karl von Wallburg; Heinrich von Wallburg; Clothilde Elisabeth Mathilda von Wallburg
Names
- Ernst Karl Felix Maria Rainer Gottfried Cyriak
- House: House of Habsburg-Lorraine
- Father: Archduke Rainer Joseph of Austria
- Mother: Princess Elisabeth of Savoy

Archduke Ernst of Austria (Ernst Karl Felix Maria Rainer Gottfried Cyriak), Archduke of Austria, Prince Royal of Hungary and Bohemia (August 8, 1824, Milan – April 4, 1899, Arco) was a member of the House of Habsburg-Lorraine.

== Early life ==
Ernst was the second son of the viceroy Archduke Rainer Joseph of Austria and Princess Elisabeth of Savoy. In 1844 was made a Knight of the Order of the Golden Fleece by Emperor Ferdinand I of Austria.

== Military career ==
Ernst started his military career in the garrison of Milan, and in 1845 was appointed colonel and the commander of the 48th Infantry Regiment. In 1847, he was promoted to major general. In 1848, Ernst participated in the events of the 1848 revolution in Milan, when the Austrian troops had to withdraw from the city. In 1849, Ernst was sent with his regiment to Tuscany and managed to occupy Livorno and for a short time to disperse the troops of Giuseppe Garibaldi. For these activities he was in 1850 awarded the Military Merit Cross and promoted to the rank of Feldmarschall-Leutnant.

In the 1850s, Ernst was stationed in Pressburg, and since 1858 in Buda, where he was appointed a commander of the cavalry corps. In 1866, he participated in military action in Bohemia.

In 1867, Ernst was appointed General of the Cavalry, and in 1868 he retired.

== Marriage and children ==
Monarchical styles of Archduke Ernest of Austria
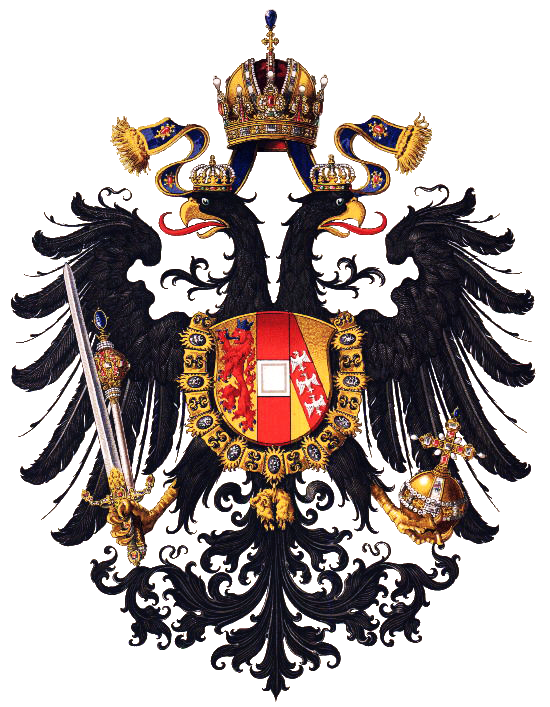
- Reference style: His Imperial and Royal Highness
- Spoken style: Your Imperial and Royal Highness

Ernst claimed that he married the Hungarian noble lady Laura Skublics de Velike et Bessenyö (July 6, 1826, Schloss Bessenyö – October, 18, 1865, Vienna) on April 26 of 1858 in Laibach. She was the daughter of the nobleman Aloysius Skublics de Velike et Besenyő (1791–1835), Prothonotary of the County of Zala, and Barbara Skublics de Velike et Besenyő, née Ivánkovich de Köbölkút (1791–1835). The Emperor Franz Joseph I had refused to give permission for the morganatic marriage. Nevertheless, the couple treated their union as a marriage and Laura was known as Baroness von Wallburg and their four children who were baptised with the surname 'von Wallburg'. But there was no granting of that title.

- Laura von Wallburg (January 17, 1859, Vienna – after 1911)
- Ernst Heinrich Karl von Wallburg (January 17, 1859, Vienna – February 16, 1920, Budapest), married with children
- Heinrich von Wallburg (June 27, 1861, Vienna – February 2, 1888, Krems)
- Clothilde von Wallburg (August 12, 1863, Laibach – July 1, 1953, Trieste); married

After the death of the Archduke, the Wallburg children tried to claim part of the estate of the late Archduke in the courts. However, the case collapsed as the marriage certificated presented turned out to be a forgery. In 1908 Franz Joseph ordered that the baptismal records of the children be altered, and that the children be given the surname of their mother Skublics on the grounds that no marriage had ever taken place.

== Orders and decorations ==
- Austrian Empire:
  - Knight of the Order of the Golden Fleece, 1844
  - Grand Cross of the Austrian Imperial Order of Leopold, with War Decoration, 1849
  - Military Merit Cross, with War Decoration
- Russian Empire:
  - Knight of the Imperial Order of Saint Andrew the Apostle the First-called
  - Knight of the Imperial Order of Saint Alexander Nevsky
  - Knight of the Imperial Order of the White Eagle
  - Knight of the Imperial Order of Saint Anna, 1st Class
- Kingdom of Prussia:
  - Knight of the Order of the Black Eagle, 4 June 1853
  - Knight of the Order of the Red Eagle, 1st Class
- Kingdom of Italy: Knight of the Supreme Order of the Most Holy Annunciation
- Holy See: Grand Cross of the Pontifical Equestrian Order of Saint Gregory the Great
- Greece Kingdom of Greece: Grand Cross of the Order of the Redeemer
- Monaco: Grand Cross of the Order of Saint-Charles

== Ancestry ==
Ancestors of Archduke Ernest of Austria (1824–1899)

8. Francis I, Holy Roman Emperor
4. Leopold II, Holy Roman Emperor
9. Maria Theresa of Austria
2. Archduke Rainer of Austria
10. Charles III of Spain
5. Infanta Maria Luisa of Spain
11. Princess Maria Amalia of Saxony
1. Archduke Ernst of Austria
12. Victor Amadeus II, Prince of Carignano
6. Charles Emmanuel, Prince of Carignano
13. Princess Joséphine of Lorraine
3. Princess Elisabeth of Savoy
14. Charles, Duke of Courland
7. Princess Maria Christina of Saxony
15. Countess Franciszka Krasińska
