= Archduke Heinrich of Austria =

Austrian archduke (1828–1891)

Archduke Heinrich
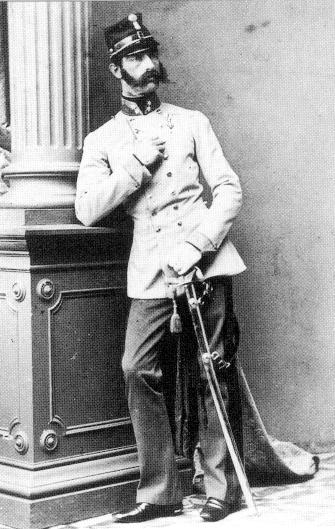
- Heinrich c. 1870
- Born: 9 May 1828; Milan, Lombardy–Venetia
- Died: 30 November 1891 (aged 63); Vienna
- Spouse: Leopoldine Hofmann (m. 1868)
- Issue: Marie Rainiera von Waideck (1872–1936)
Names
- Heinrich Anton Maria Rainer Karl Gregor
- House: House of Habsburg-Lorraine
- Father: Archduke Rainer of Austria
- Mother: Princess Elisabeth of Savoy

Archduke Heinrich of Austria (Heinrich Anton Maria Rainer Karl Gregor), (May 9, 1828 – November 30, 1891) was an Archduke of Austria and Lieutenant field marshal.

== Early life ==
Heinrich was the fifth son of the Viceroy Archduke Rainer of Austria and Princess Elisabeth of Savoy.

== Career ==
Monarchical styles of Archduke Heinrich of Austria
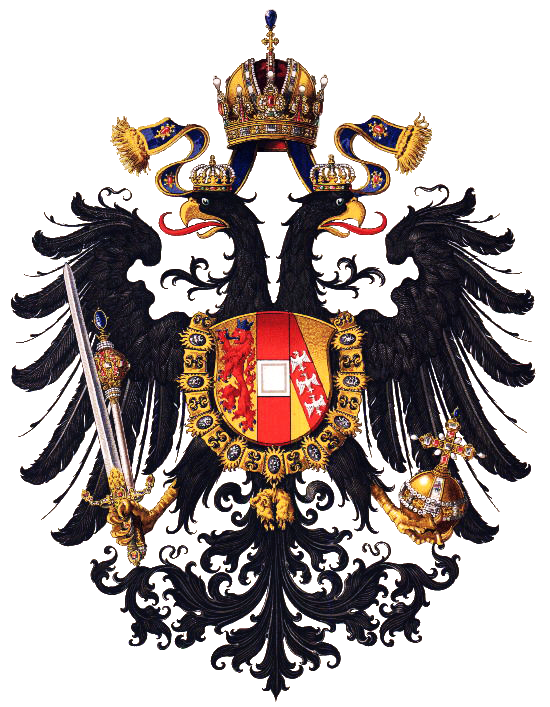
- Reference style: His Imperial and Royal Highness
- Spoken style: Your Imperial and Royal Highness

Heinrich had a military career and became Feldmarschallleutnant and commander of a division in Graz and later Brünn. He saw action in the War against Italy and distinguished himself during the Battle of Custoza in 1866.

In 1852 he was made a Knight of the Order of the Golden Fleece by Emperor Franz Joseph I of Austria.

Due to the disapproval of Emperor Franz Joseph I of Austria following his morganatic marriage in 1868, he was expelled from the royal family and laid down all his military functions and moved to Luzern in Switzerland, where the couple lived until he was pardoned by the Emperor in 1871. The couple returned to Tyrol where Heinrich retired from the Army and lived in a palace in the Musterstreet in Bolzano.

== Personal life ==
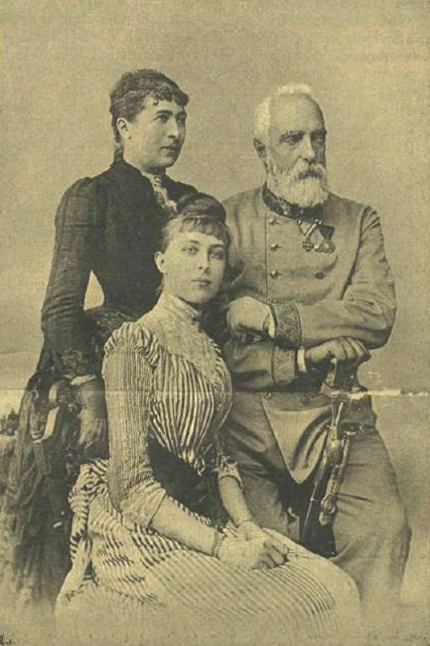
Heinrich and his wife and daughter in 1891

Heinrich married morganatically on February 4, 1868, in Bolzano with singer Leopoldine Hofmann (1840–1891), who became Freifrau von Waideck in 1878. They had one daughter:

- Marie Rainiera, Countess von Waideck (1872–1936), who married Enrico Lucchesi Palli, Duke della Grazia and Prince of Campofranco (1861–1924), grandson of Princess Maria Carolina of Bourbon-Two Sicilies, the famous Duchess of Berry, in 1892. They had one daughter – Donna Maria Renata Lucchesi-Palli del Principi di Campofranco (1895 - 1976).

On a rare visit to Vienna in 1891, both Heinrich and his wife contracted pneumonia (see also 1889–1890 pandemic) and they died in the same night.

== Ancestry ==
Ancestors of Archduke Heinrich of Austria

8. Francis I, Holy Roman Emperor
4. Leopold II, Holy Roman Emperor
9. Maria Theresa of Austria
2. Archduke Rainer of Austria
10. Charles III of Spain
5. Infanta Maria Luisa of Spain
11. Princess Maria Amalia of Saxony
1. Archduke Heinrich of Austria
12. Victor Amadeus II, Prince of Carignano
6. Charles Emmanuel, Prince of Carignano
13. Princess Joséphine of Lorraine
3. Princess Elisabeth of Savoy
14. Charles, Duke of Courland
7. Princess Maria Christina of Saxony
15. Countess Franciszka Krasińska
