= Archduke Sigismund of Austria (1826–1891) =

Austrian archduke (1826–1891)

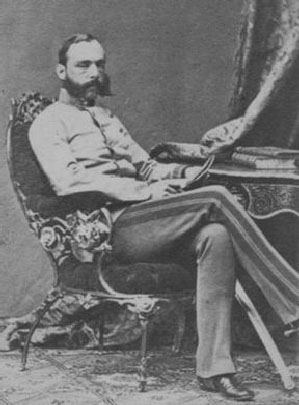
- Sigismund c. 1850s
- Born: Sigismund Leopold Maria Rainer Ambrosius Valentin; 7 January 1826; Milan
- Died: 19 December 1891 (aged 65); Vienna
- House: Habsburg-Lorraine
- Father: Archduke Rainer Joseph of Austria
- Mother: Princess Elisabeth of Savoy

Archduke Sigismund of Austria (Sigismund Leopold Maria Rainer Ambrosius Valentin) (Milan, 7 January 1826 – Vienna, 15 December 1891), was an Archduke of Austria.

== Life ==
Monarchical styles of Archduke Sigismund of Austria
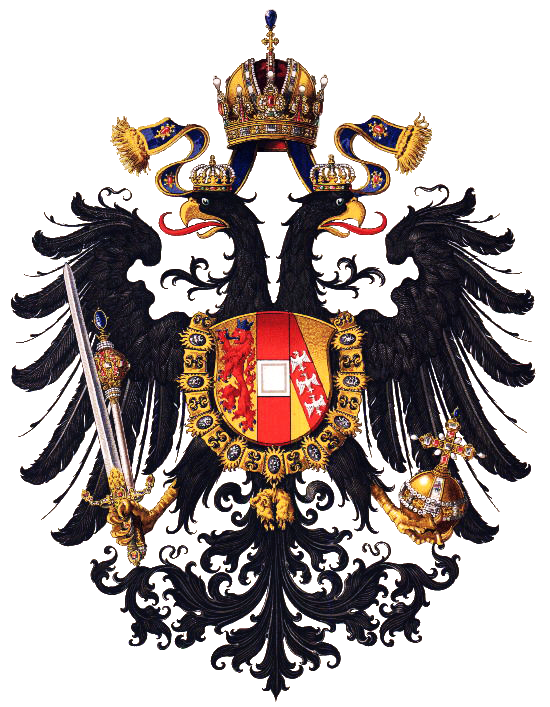
- Reference style: His Imperial and Royal Highness
- Spoken style: Your Imperial and Royal Highness

He was the third son of Archduke Rainer Joseph of Austria, Viceroy of the Kingdom of Lombardy–Venetia and Princess Elisabeth of Savoy.

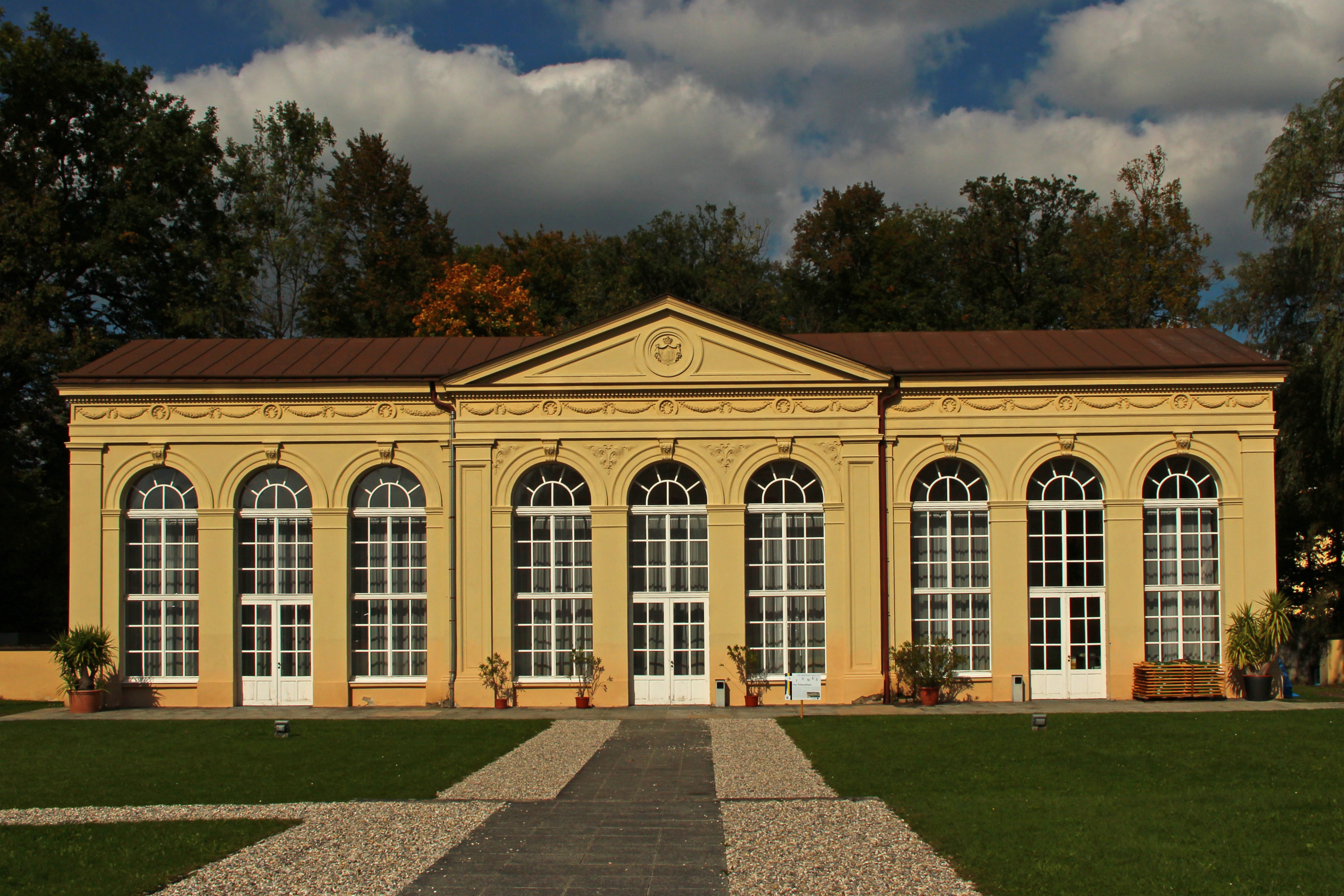
Palmhouse in the Gmünd Castle garden

In Imperial-Austrian military services, Sigismund reached the rank of Fieldmarshal-Lieutenant and was owner of the Infantry Regiment No. 45.

He participated at the head of a brigade in the Battles of Santa Lucia, Pastrengo and Novara (1848–1849). In 1852 he was made a Knight of the Order of the Golden Fleece by Emperor Franz Joseph.

In 1859 Sigismund came into the possession of Gmünd Castle. As a botanist and dendrologist, he had an orchid and palm house as well as a landscape park constructed.

Sigismund contracted a viral disease then called influenza (see 1889–1890 pandemic) in Vienna on December 15th 1891, died from pneumonia unmarried and childless four days later and was buried in his own mausoleum in the Gmünd cemetery.

== Orders and decorations ==
- Austrian Empire:
  - Knight of the Order of the Golden Fleece, 1852
- Russian Empire:
  - Knight of the Imperial Order of Saint Alexander Nevsky
  - Knight of the Imperial Order of the White Eagle
  - Knight of the Imperial Order of Saint Anna, 1st Class

== Ancestry ==
Ancestors of Archduke Sigismund of Austria (1826–1891)

8. Francis I, Holy Roman Emperor
4. Leopold II, Holy Roman Emperor
9. Maria Theresa of Austria
2. Archduke Rainer of Austria
10. Charles III of Spain
5. Infanta Maria Luisa of Spain
11. Princess Maria Amalia of Saxony
1. Archduke Sigismund of Austria
12. Victor Amadeus II, Prince of Carignano
6. Charles Emmanuel, Prince of Carignano
13. Princess Joséphine of Lorraine
3. Princess Elisabeth of Savoy
14. Charles, Duke of Courland
7. Princess Maria Christina of Saxony
15. Countess Franciszka Krasińska
