= Prince Oddone, Duke of Montferrat =

Duke of Montferrat (1846–1866)

Prince Oddone of Savoy
- Duke of Montferrat
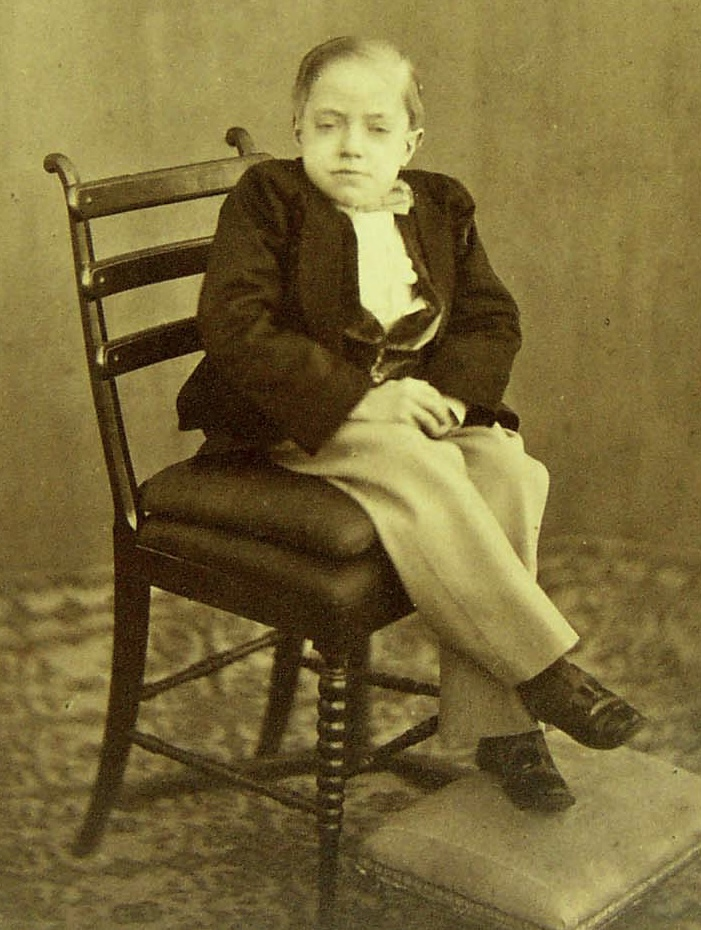
- Prince Oddone c. 1855–1860
- Born: 11 July 1846; Royal Palace of Turin
- Died: 22 January 1866 (aged 19); Royal Palace of Genoa
Names
- Oddone Eugenio Maria di Savoia
- House: Savoy
- Father: Victor Emmanuel II
- Mother: Adelaide of Austria

Prince Oddone of Savoy, Duke of Montferrat (Oddone Eugenio Maria; 11 July 1846 – 22 January 1866) was an Italian humanist and philanthropist and member of the Royal House of Savoy. He was the fourth child and third-eldest son of King Victor Emmanuel II of Italy and his first wife Adelaide of Austria.

== Life ==
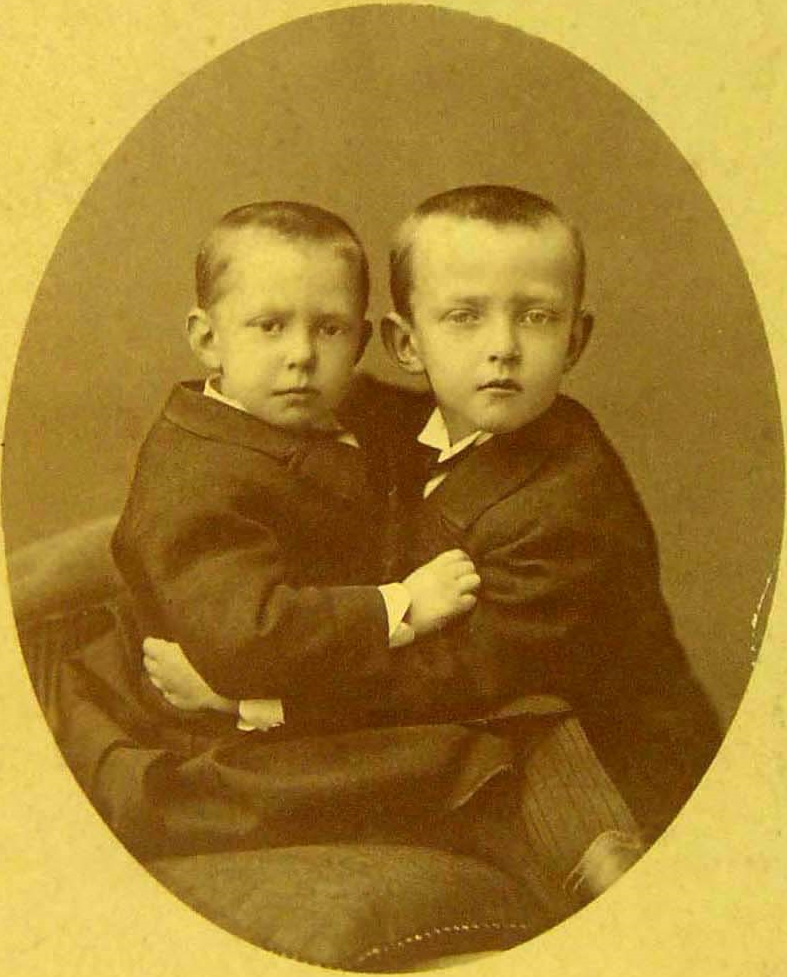
Oddone with his older brother Amadeo (future King of Spain), 1850

Born with a serious genetic disease, from the age of two he showed severely debilitating symptoms (dwarfism and developmental deformity); he was therefore placed on the margins of the court life of the House of Savoy due to poor health. Endowed with intelligence, resourcefulness and intellectual liveliness, he therefore dedicated himself to studying, taking an interest in his short existence in various subjects, both scientific and artistic.

During his brief life, the prince was occupied with the study of art and the acquisition of artifacts from ancient Greece and Rome for the city of Genoa, which remain in the Museum of Ligurian Archaeology (Italian: Museo di Archeologia Ligure). Other pieces Oddone collected and donated are present at Genoa's Gallery of Modern Art, which is partly named for the prince. Oddone lived the last four years of his life in Genoa. The prince chose Genoa for his residence for its mild climate that benefited his ailing physical condition.

As a scholar, the prince had come into contact with leading cultural figures, including the sculptor Santo Varni, who served as his adviser and friend, Tammar Luxoro, and Pasquale Domenico Cambiaso. Oddone died at age 19 at the Royal Palace of Genoa shortly before dawn on 22 January 1866.

== Ancestry ==
Ancestors of Prince Oddone, Duke of Montferrat

8. Charles Emmanuel, Prince of Carignano
4. Charles Albert of Sardinia
9. Princess Maria Christina of Saxony
2. Victor Emmanuel II of Italy
10. Ferdinand III of Tuscany
5. Archduchess Maria Theresa of Austria
11. Princess Luisa of Naples and Sicily
1. Prince Oddone, Duke of Montferrat
12. Leopold II, Holy Roman Emperor
6. Archduke Rainer of Austria
13. Infanta Maria Luisa of Spain
3. Archduchess Adelaide of Austria
14. Charles Emmanuel, Prince of Carignano (= 8)
7. Princess Elisabeth of Savoy
15. Princess Maria Christina of Saxony (= 9)

== Bibliography ==
- "Odone of Savoy 1846-1866. Collections of a prince for Genoa", Mazzotta, Milan, 1996.
