= Adelaide of Austria =

Queen of Sardinia from 1849 to 1855

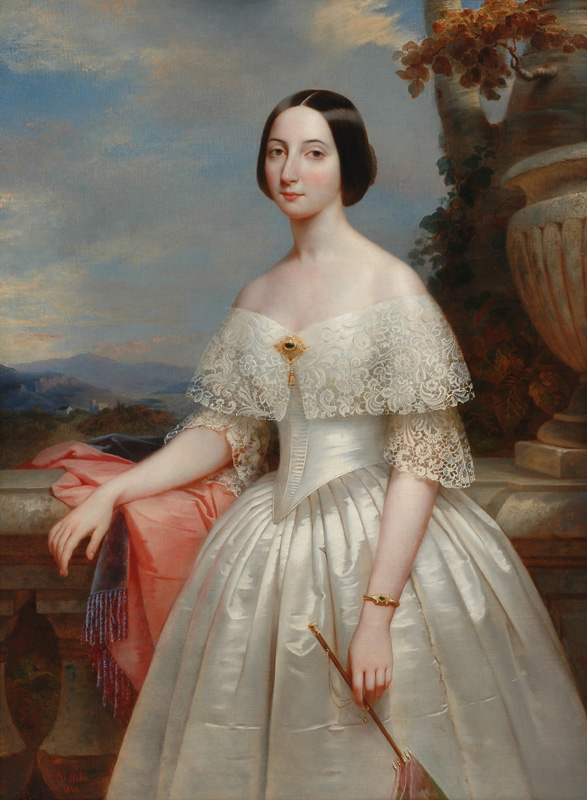
- 1848 portrait

Queen consort of Sardinia
- Tenure: 23 March 1849 – 20 January 1855
- Born: 3 June 1822; Royal Palace of Milan, Kingdom of Lombardy-Venetia, Austrian Empire
- Died: 20 January 1855 (aged 32); Royal Palace of Turin, Kingdom of Sardinia
- Burial: Basilica of Superga, Turin
- Spouse: Victor Emmanuel II of Sardinia (m. 1842)
- Issue among others...: Maria Clotilde, Princess Napoléon; Umberto I, King of Italy; Amadeo I, King of Spain; Oddone, Duke of Montferrat; Maria Pia, Queen of Portugal
Names
- Adelheid Franziska Marie Rainera Elisabeth Clotilde
- House: Habsburg-Lorraine
- Father: Archduke Rainer of Austria
- Mother: Princess Elisabeth of Savoy

Adelaide of Austria (Adelheid Franziska Marie Rainera Elisabeth Clotilde; 3 June 1822 – 20 January 1855) was Queen of Sardinia by marriage to Victor Emmanuel II of Sardinia, future King of Italy, from 1849 until 1855 when she died as a result of gastroenteritis. She was the mother of Umberto I of Italy.

== Biography ==
=== Archduchess of Austria ===
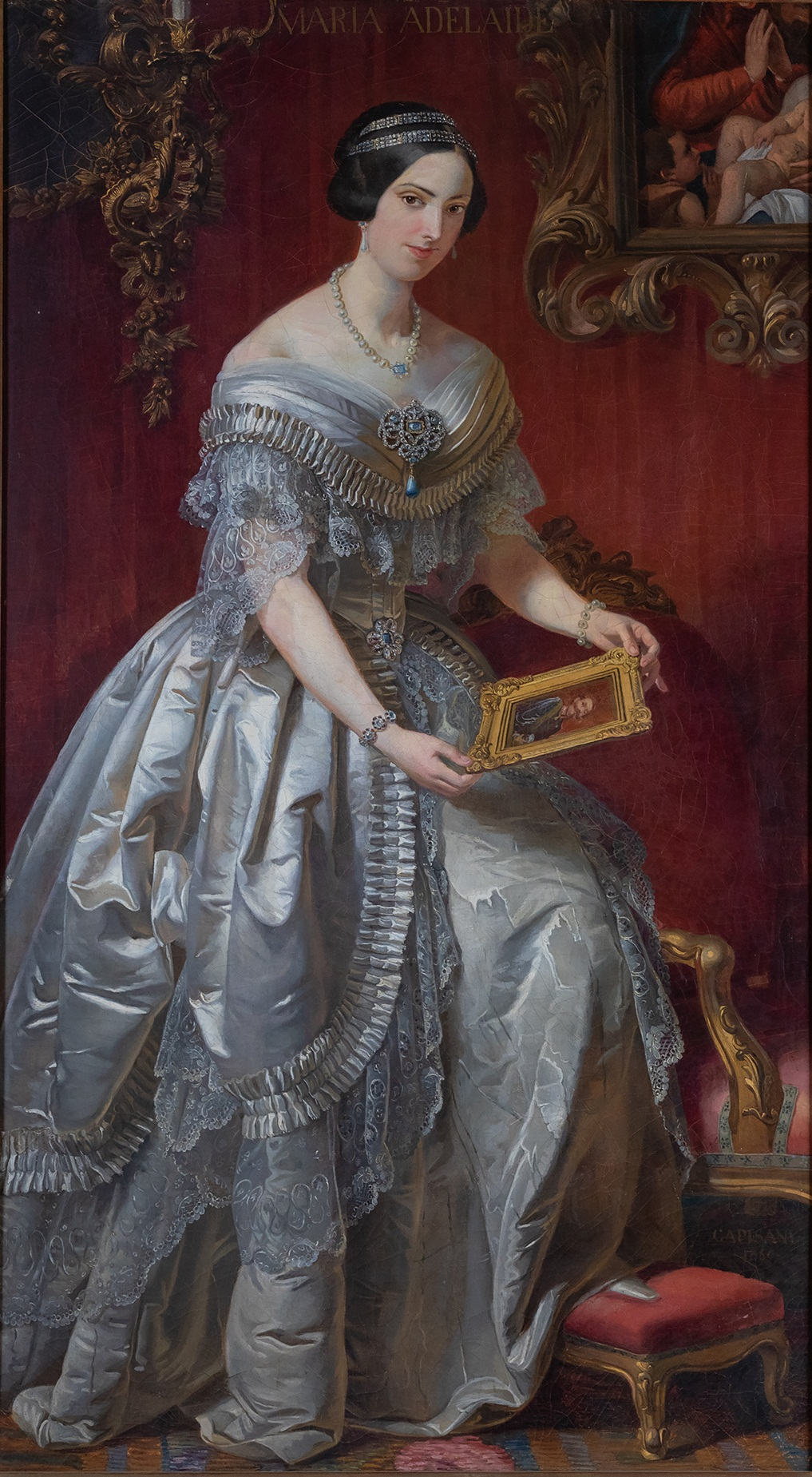
Archduchess Adelaide as queen consort

She was born at the Royal Palace of Milan on 3 June 1822 to Archduke Rainer of Austria and Princess Elisabeth of Savoy. Named Adelaide, or known as Adele in the family, she held the title of Archduchess of Austria. Her father was the Viceroy of Lombardy-Venetia.

=== Duchess of Savoy ===
On 12 April 1842, at the Palazzina di Caccia di Stupinigi, she married Victor Emmanuel, Duke of Savoy. The marriage was used to cement relations between the Houses of Savoy and Habsburg, but was seen by many at the time as increasing Austrian power in Italy.

Victor Emmanuel was her paternal first cousin once removed and also her maternal first cousin, as her new father-in-law was also her maternal uncle. Prince Victor Emmanuel was the heir to his father King Charles Albert of Sardinia. He was styled the "Duke of Savoy" prior to succession. Adelaide thus took on the style of "Duchess of Savoy". She maintained her style of Imperial and Royal Highness until she became Queen.

Her mother-in-law, Maria Theresa of Tuscany, retained great influence over her son throughout his life. She was also her first cousin, both she and Adelaide being granddaughters of Emperor Leopold II. Adelaide and her husband of 13 years had eight children. Four of these went on to have further progeny. Her husband had various extramarital affairs throughout the marriage. Adelaide was a quiet and pious woman and had a strict upbringing. She was a loving wife and frequently would give to charity.

=== Queen of Sardinia ===
In March 1849, her father-in-law King Charles Albert abdicated after the events of the Revolutions of 1848. Her husband succeeded as Victor Emmanuel II of Sardinia. During her tenure as queen consort, she had three further children, all of whom died in infancy.

Queen Adelaide had no political influence, but she did on one occasion support her mother-in-law, queen dowager Maria Theresa, who had great influence over her son and who in one well known occasion tried to influence policy. When the reforms against the privileges of the Church were introduced by the Cavour government in 1854, she united with her mother-in-law to support the latter's appeal to the king to prevent the reform with the argument that the reform was hostile to the church and thus unacceptable for a Christian. The effort was however unsuccessful.

On 8 January 1855, she gave birth to a son who was styled the Count of Genevois. Days later, her mother in law, Queen Maria Theresa died on 12 January 1855. Adelaide went to the late queen's funeral on 16 January, and on returning to the palace, caught a cold. She died four days later at the Royal Palace of Turin, having had an acute attack of gastroenteritis. Another story says that Adelaide died of her burns after stepping on a match that set fire to her clothes. She is buried at the Royal Basilica of Superga. In 1861, her husband would become the first post-unification King of Italy.

== Issue ==
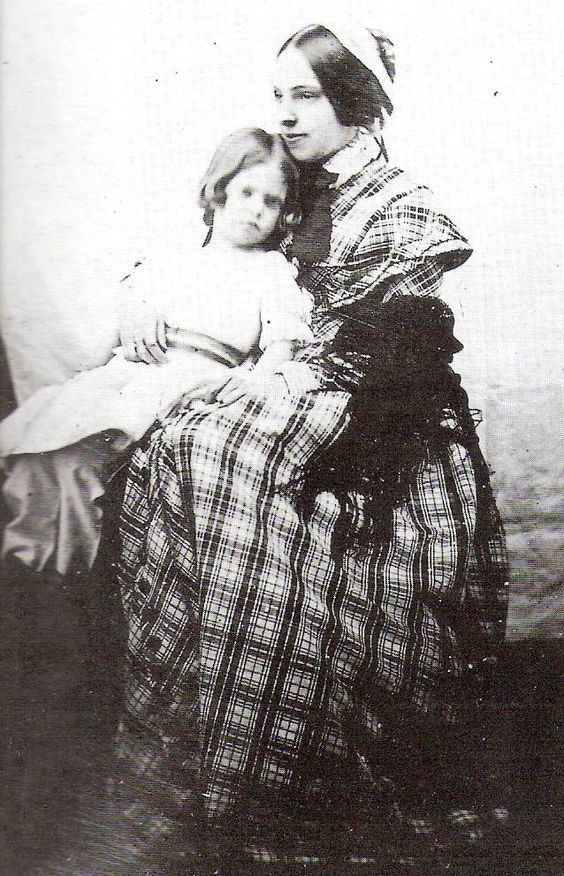
Adelaide with her daughter Maria Pia, c. 1850–1855

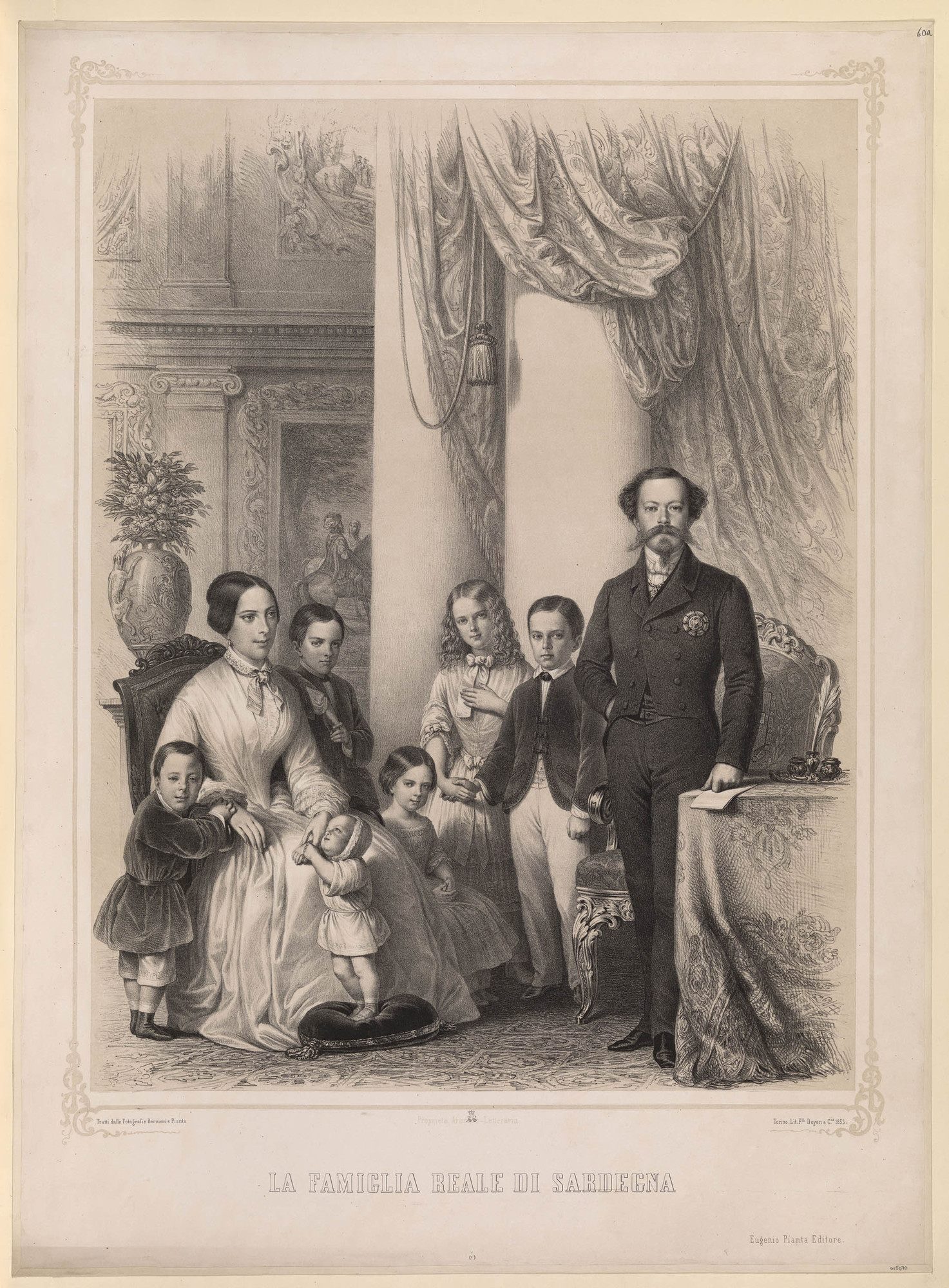
Queen Adelaide with her husband and six older children, ca. 1854

- Princess Maria Clotilde of Savoy (2 March 1843 – 25 June 1911) married Prince Napoleon Joseph Bonaparte and had issue.
- Umberto I of Italy (14 March 1844 – 29 July 1900) married Princess Margherita of Savoy and had issue.
- Amadeo I of Spain (30 May 1845 – 18 January 1890) married Princess Maria Vittoria dal Pozzo and later Princess Maria Letizia Bonaparte and had issue.
- Prince Oddone of Savoy (11 July 1846 – 22 January 1866) died unmarried.
- Princess Maria Pia of Savoy (16 October 1847 – 5 July 1911) married King Luís I of Portugal and had issue.
- Prince Carlo Alberto of Savoy (2 June 1851 – 22 June 1854) Duke of Chablais, died in childhood.
- Prince Vittorio Emanuele of Savoy (6 July 1852) died at birth.
- Prince Vittorio Emanuele of Savoy (8 January 1855 – 17 May 1855) Count of Genevois, died in infancy.

== Ancestry ==
Ancestors of Adelaide of Austria

8. Francis I, Holy Roman Emperor
4. Leopold II, Holy Roman Emperor
9. Maria Theresa of Austria
2. Archduke Rainer of Austria
10. Charles III of Spain
5. Infanta Maria Luisa of Spain
11. Princess Maria Amalia of Saxony
1. Adelaide of Austria
12. Victor Amadeus II, Prince of Carignano
6. Charles Emmanuel, Prince of Carignano
13. Princess Joséphine of Lorraine
3. Princess Elisabeth of Savoy
14. Charles, Duke of Courland
7. Princess Maria Christina of Saxony
15. Countess Franciszka Krasińska

Adelaide of Austria House of Habsburg-Lorraine Cadet branch of the House of Lorraine Born: 3 June 1822 Died: 20 January 1855
Italian royalty
Preceded by Maria Theresa of Austria	Queen consort of Sardinia; 23 March 1849 – 20 January 1855	Kingdom of Italy established Kingdom of Sardinia dissolved
