= Archduke Rainer of Austria (1827–1913) =

Austrian archduke and politician (1827–1913)

His Imperial and Royal Highness Archduke Rainer of Austria
- Rainer in 1910

3rd Chairman of the Austrian Ministers' Conference
- In office 4 February 1861 – 26 June 1865
- Monarch: Francis Joseph I
- Preceded by: Johann Bernhard Graf von Rechberg und Rothenlöwen
- Succeeded by: Alexander Graf von Mensdorff-Pouilly

Personal details
- Born: 11 January 1827 Milan, Kingdom of Lombardy–Venetia, Austrian Empire
- Died: 27 January 1913 (aged 86) Hofburg Palace, Vienna, Austria-Hungary
- Resting place: Imperial Crypt
- Spouse: Archduchess Maria Karoline of Austria (m. 1852)
- Education: University of Vienna
Names
- Rainer Ferdinand Maria Johann Evangelist Franz Ignaz
- House: Habsburg-Lorraine
- Father: Archduke Rainer of Austria
- Mother: Princess Elisabeth of Savoy

Archduke Rainer Ferdinand Maria Johann Evangelist Franz Ignaz of Austria (11 January 1827 – 27 January 1913) was an Austrian prince and politician who served as Minister-President of Austria from 1861 to 1865. Later in his life, he took up the collection of preserved papyri, largely from Egypt, and served as a benefactor and patron while working with the Oriental studies department of the University of Vienna. His purchases of papyri from Egypt formed the Rainer collection at the Austrian National Library.

== Biography ==
Archduke Rainer Ferdinand was born in Milan, the capital of the Austrian Kingdom of Lombardy–Venetia. He was a son of the viceroy, Archduke Rainer, and Princess Elisabeth of Savoy. He spent most of his youth at the Royal Villa of Monza. Rainer studied law at the University of Vienna and in 1843 joined the Austrian Imperial Army in the rank of an Oberst (Colonel).

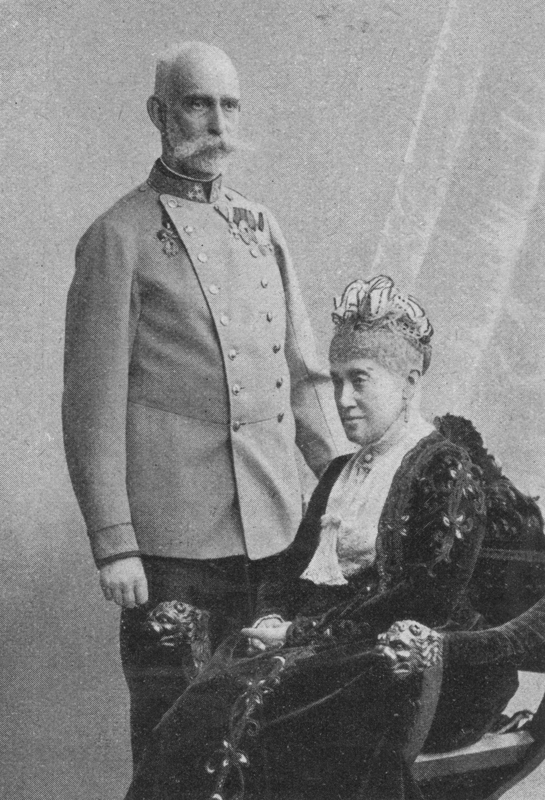
Rainer and Maria, 1902

In 1852, Archduke Rainer married his cousin Archduchess Maria Karoline (1825–1915), whose father, Charles, was known for his victory at the 1809 Battle of Aspern. The marriage was a very happy one, and, with numerous public appearances and charitable activities, the couple was probably the most popular amongst the Habsburg family. The lavish celebration of their diamond wedding in 1912 was rated as one of the last great events of the Austro-Hungarian Monarchy before World War I. However, the marriage remained childless.

In 1854, Rainer achieved the rank of Generalmajor in the Imperial Army and in 1861 was raised to Feldmarschall-Leutnant (Field marshal lieutenant). In 1857, Archduke Rainer was appointed president of the Austrian Imperial Council by Emperor Francis Joseph I. In the course of the implementation of the 1861 February Patent constitution, he took up office as nominal Minister-President chairing the liberal cabinet of State Minister Anton von Schmerling.

Rainer was popular with the nonaristocratic population of Vienna, often walking the streets on foot.

== Papyrus collection ==
Monarchical styles of Archduke Rainer Ferdinand of Austria
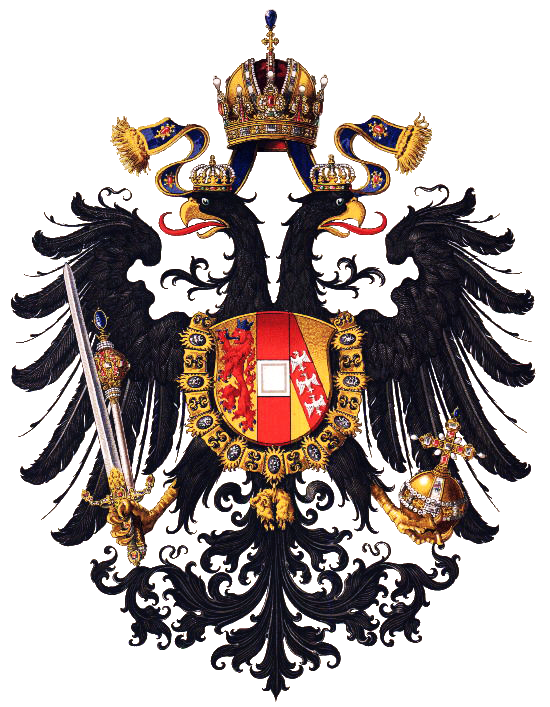
- Reference style: His Imperial and Royal Highness
- Spoken style: Your Imperial and Royal Highness

While Rainer's military and political career was largely forgotten, his interest in art and science proved more lasting. Later in his life, Archduke Rainer became interested in the emerging science of papyrology, the study of preserved papyrus in the deserts of Egypt that offered primary source documents from centuries earlier. In 1878–1879, the Viennese dealer in antiquities Theodor Graf purchased recently found papyri from Faiyum, known as Arsinoe in the Hellenistic period. Graf contacted Professor of Oriental History at the University of Vienna Josef Karabacek and arranged the shipping of around 10,000 papyri to him. The papyri made their way to Vienna in 1881 and 1882 while awaiting a buyer; at the end of 1883, Archduke Rainer agreed to purchase the papyri. Professor Karabacek managed and processed both the sale and the collection. The collection was initially stored at the Österreichischen Museum für Kunst und Industrie (the predecessor of the modern Museum of Applied Arts). Archduke Rainer continued to expand the collection with new purchases that Graf arranged, including papyri from digs at Hermopolis, Heracleopolis Magna, and other sites in the Faiyum area such as Soknopaiou Nesos. Rainer gifted the collection to his uncle Emperor Franz Joseph I of Austria on August 18, 1899 as a birthday present. At Rainer's request, Franz Joseph incorporated them as a special collection at the Imperial and Royal Court Library (now known as the Austrian National Library). Rainer's vast purchases provided the core of the collection that still exists today as one of the most significant collection of papyri in the world. The Rainer collection at the Austrian National Library was given the honour of becoming part of the UNESCO Memory of the World Register in 2001.

== Honours and awards ==
Austro-Hungarian

- Knight of the Golden Fleece, 1852
- Grand Cross of the Royal Hungarian Order of St. Stephen, 1862
- Military Merit Cross, in Diamonds
- Bronze Military Merit Medal on Red Ribbon

Foreign

- Baden: Knight of the House Order of Fidelity, 1873
- Kingdom of Bavaria: Knight of St. Hubert, 1860
- Belgium: Grand Cordon of the Order of Leopold (military), 2 February 1874
- Empire of Brazil: Grand Cross of the Southern Cross
- (Saxe-Coburg and Gotha) (Duchy of Saxe-Altenburg) (Saxe-Meiningen) Ernestine duchies: Grand Cross of the Saxe-Ernestine House Order
- France: Grand Cross of the Legion of Honour
- Kingdom of Greece: Grand Cross of the Redeemer
- Grand Duchy of Hesse:
  - Grand Cross of the Ludwig Order, 11 September 1860
  - Knight of the Golden Lion
- Kingdom of Italy: Knight of the Annunciation, 21 September 1873
- Mecklenburg: Grand Cross of the Wendish Crown
- Monaco: Grand Cross of St. Charles
- (Duchy of Nassau) Nassau Ducal Family: Knight of the Gold Lion of Nassau
- Netherlands: Grand Cross of the Netherlands Lion
- Kingdom of Portugal: Grand Cross of the Tower and Sword
- Kingdom of Prussia:
  - Knight of the Black Eagle, 4 June 1853
  - Knight of the Red Eagle, 1st Class
- Kingdom of Romania: Grand Cross of the Star of Romania
- Russian Empire:
  - Knight of St. Andrew
  - Knight of St. Alexander Nevsky
  - Knight of the White Eagle
  - Knight of St. Anna, 1st Class
- Saxe-Weimar-Eisenach: Grand Cross of the White Falcon, 1885
- Kingdom of Saxony: Knight of the Rue Crown, 1891
- Spain: Grand Cross of the Order of Charles III, with Collar, 24 November 1879
- Sweden: Knight of the Seraphim, 5 December 1908
- Grand Duchy of Tuscany: Grand Cross of St. Joseph
- Two Sicilies:
  - Knight of St. Januarius
  - Grand Cross of St. Ferdinand and Merit
- United Kingdom: Honorary Grand Cross of the Royal Victorian Order, 9 October 1903
- Württemberg: Grand Cross of the Württemberg Crown, 1873

== Ancestry ==
Ancestors of Archduke Rainer of Austria (1827–1913)

8. Francis I, Holy Roman Emperor
4. Leopold II, Holy Roman Emperor
9. Maria Theresa of Austria
2. Archduke Rainer of Austria
10. Charles III of Spain
5. Infanta Maria Luisa of Spain
11. Princess Maria Amalia of Saxony
1. Archduke Rainer of Austria
12. Victor Amadeus II, Prince of Carignano
6. Charles Emmanuel, Prince of Carignano
13. Princess Joséphine of Lorraine
3. Princess Elisabeth of Savoy
14. Charles, Duke of Courland
7. Princess Maria Christina of Saxony
15. Countess Franciszka Krasińska

Preceded by Johann Bernhard von Rechberg und Rothenlöwen	Minister-President of Austria; 4 February 1861 – 26 June 1865	Succeeded by Alexander von Mensdorff-Pouilly
