= Maleszowa =

- Village
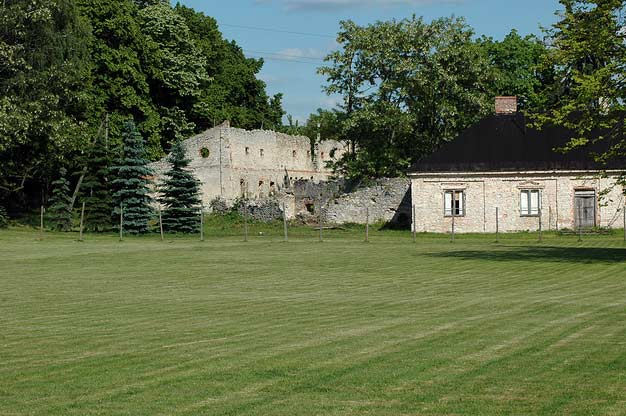

- Location within Poland
- Coordinates: 50°40′45″N 20°43′32″E
- Country: Poland
- Voivodeship: Świętokrzyskie
- County: Kielce
- Gmina: Pierzchnica
- Population: 350

Maleszowa (Polish: [male'szowa]) is a village in the administrative district of Gmina Pierzchnica, within Kielce County, Świętokrzyskie Voivodeship, in south-central Poland. It lies approximately 3 km (2 mi) south-west of Pierzchnica and 24 km (15 mi) south of the regional capital Kielce.

Franciszka Krasińska was born here.
