= Marienstern Abbey =

Cistercian nunnery in Mühlberg, Brandenburg, Germany

Coordinates: 51°26′09″N 13°13′10″E

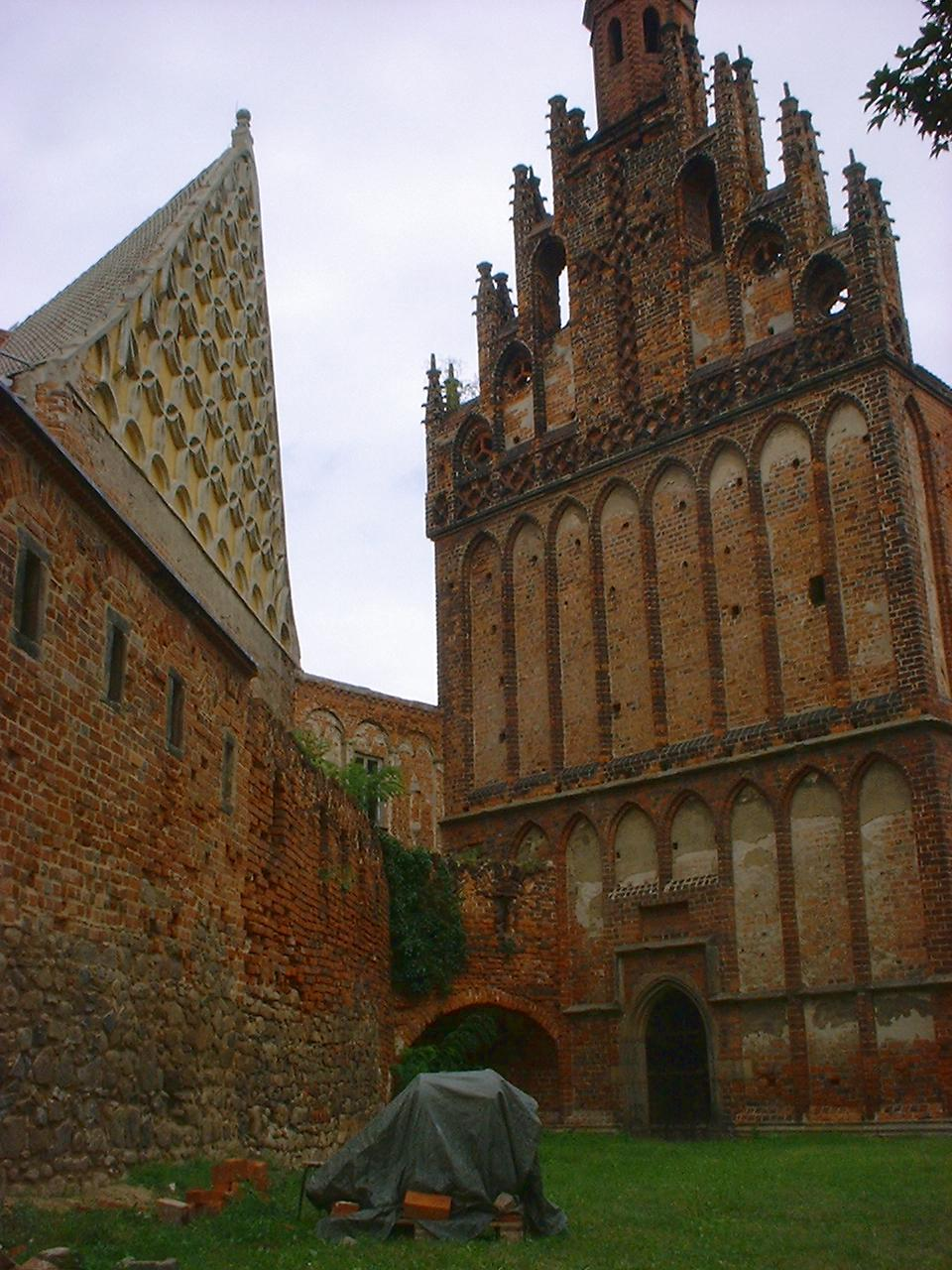
Marienstern Abbey.

Marienstern Abbey (Kloster Marienstern, formerly also known as Kloster Güldenstern) was a Cistercian nunnery in Mühlberg in Brandenburg, Germany. Since 2000 a small community of the Claretian missionary brothers have lived in the former abbey premises.

== History ==
The abbey was founded in 1228 by the brothers Otto and Bodo of Ileburg (Eilenburg). Henry III, Margrave of Meissen, made gifts to the new foundation and also granted his consent to convert the former parish church of Mühlberg into the monastic church.

The nunnery was secularised in 1539 during the course of the Reformation.

== Buildings ==
The single-aisled church is a Brick Gothic structure with Romanesque elements. In 1565, after several fires, it was reinstated as the parish church of Mühlberg old town. The refectory dating from the 13th / 14th centuries was altered for agricultural purposes in 1820. From 1992, restoration of the abbey church and of the refectory has been undertaken.

== Sources/ external links ==
- Kloster Marienstern: Claretians (in German)
- Building history of Kloster Marienstern (in German)
- Zisterzienser in Brandenburg: Mühlberg (in German)
