= Joseph Layraud =

French painter

Joseph Fortuné Séraphin Layraud (15 October 1834 – 12 October 1912) was a French painter. There is no complete clearance as to the birth' and the death' dates. Some sources refer to 1833–1913. His range included historical scenes and figures, religious and mythological subjects, landscapes, and portraits of contemporaries.

== Life and career ==
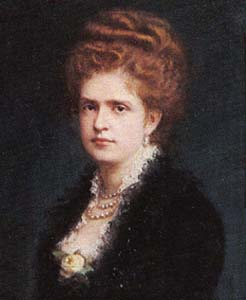
Maria Pia of Savoy, Queen of Portugal

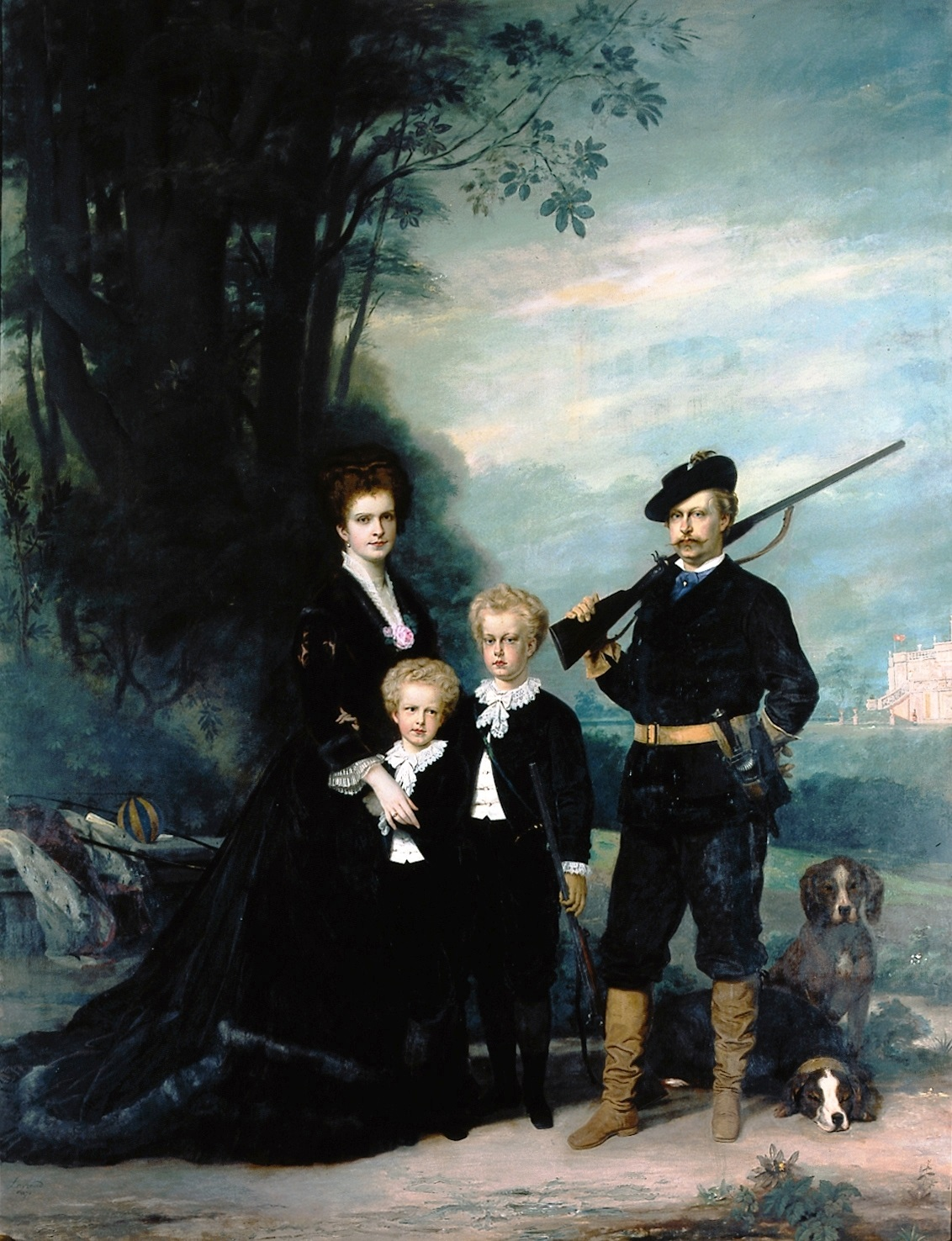
Portuguese royal family, 1876

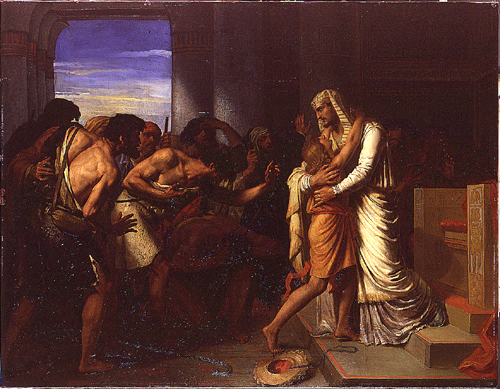
Joseph declaring himself to his brothers

Layraud was born at La Roche-sur-le-Buis in south-eastern France. After beginning his training in Marseille in 1853 he moved to Paris in 1856, studying at the École nationale supérieure des Beaux-Arts under Léon Cogniet and Tony Robert-Fleury. He was awarded the Grand Prix de Rome in 1863.

After his time in Rome, Layraud travelled in Italy and Portugal, painting landscapes, he did some history paintings and many portraits. From 1892 he was a professor at the Académie des beaux-arts in Valenciennes. His pupils included Jules Chaine, Max Albert Decrouez, Grégoire Nicolas Finez, Lucien Hector Jonas, Charles Paris, Maurice Rufin and Alfred Léon Sauvage.

Layraud exhibited at the Paris Salon, winning medals in 1872; his work was shown at the 1889 and 1900 Expositions Universelles.

Layraud was appointed Chevalier of the Légion d'Honneur in 1890 and was promoted to Officer in 1903. He died 1913 on his birth day, in Valenciennes.

== Works ==
Layraud's works are on show in French galleries in:

- Avignon (Doctor P E Chauffard)
- Bayonne (Femme au chapeau noir)
- Cahors (portrait of Léon Gambetta)
- Chambery (Le bon Samaritain)
- Épinal (Marsyas Flayed)
- Narbonne (Diogenes)
- Paris
  - Musée d'Orsay (Chambre mortuaire de Gambetta)
  - École nationale supérieure des Beaux-Arts (Joseph se fait reconnaître par ses frères)
- Troyes (vue de Lisbonne prise de la rive gauche du Tage; vue du Tage prise du palais de l'ambassade de France)
- Valence (Joseph se fait reconnaître par ses frères), (Wreck of the Medusa; Mgr Catton; Inès de Castro)

The Musée des beaux-arts of his adopted city, Valenciennes, holds many works by Layraud, including Bulls Brought Out and many portraits of which that of Liszt is among the best known.

Internationally, Layraud's work is displayed in Melbourne (Italian Highwaymen), the Ajuda National Palace, and Smith College Museum of Art, Massachusetts (Portrait de Pierre Dupont).
