= Princess Elisabeth of Savoy =

Italian princess (1800–1856)

Elisabeth of Savoy
- Archduchess Rainer Joseph of Austria
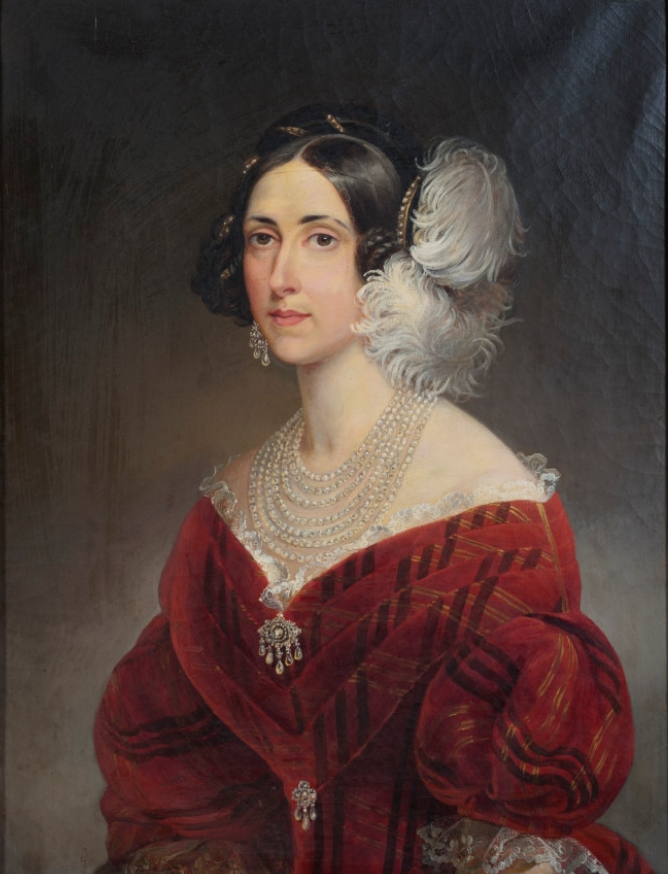
- Elisabeth in 1830
- Born: 13 April 1800; Paris, French Republic
- Died: 25 December 1856 (aged 56); Bolzano, Austrian Empire
- Burial: Maria Himmelfahrt (Bolzano)
- Spouse: Archduke Rainer Joseph of Austria (m. 1820; died 1853)
- Issue among others...: Adelaide, Queen of Sardinia; Archduke Leopold Ludwig; Archduke Ernst; Archduke Sigismund; Archduke Rainer Ferdinand; Archduke Heinrich Anton
Names
- Maria Francesca Elisabetta Carlotta Giuseppina di Savoia
- House: Savoy-Carignano
- Father: Charles Emmanuel, Prince of Carignano
- Mother: Maria Christina of Saxony

Elisabeth of Savoy (Maria Francesca Elisabetta Carlotta Giuseppina; 13 April 1800 – 25 December 1856) was the Vicereine of the Kingdom of Lombardy–Venetia by marriage to Archduke Rainer Joseph of Austria. She was the aunt and mother-in-law of Victor Emmanuel II, the first king of a united Italy. By birth, she was a member of the House of Savoy-Carignano.

== Early life ==
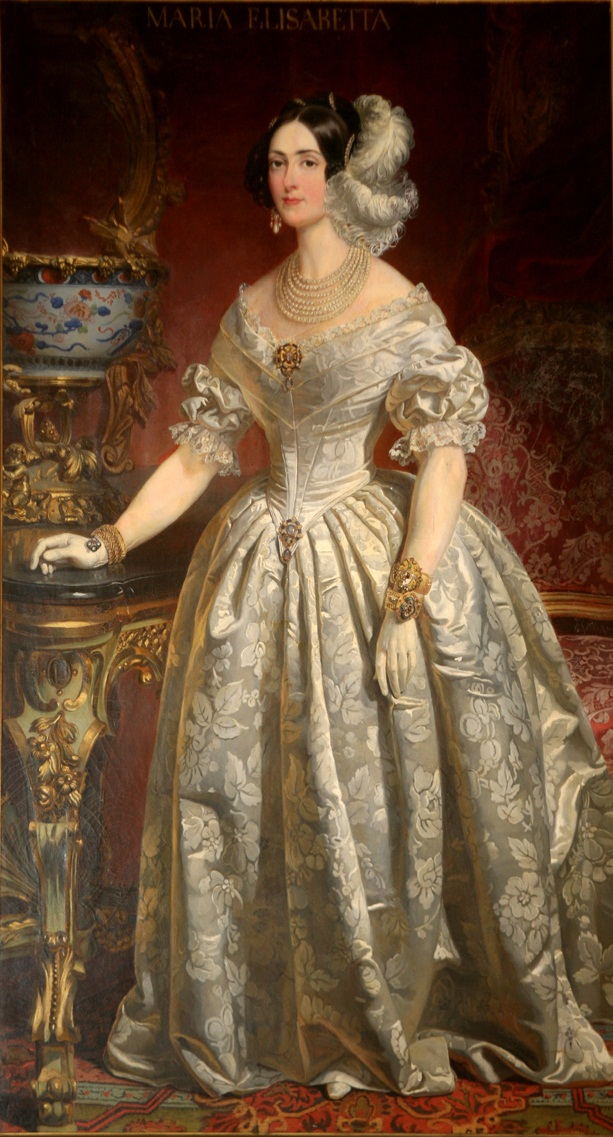
Princess Elisabeth of Savoy, 1830s

Maria Francesca Elisabetta Carlotta Giuseppina was born in Paris to Charles Emmanuel, Prince of Carignano, and Princess Maria Cristina of Saxony. She had an elder brother, Charles Albert, future King of Sardinia.

== Marriage ==
On 28 May 1820 she was married in Prague to Archduke Rainer Joseph of Austria, Viceroy of the Kingdom of Lombardy–Venetia.

== Death ==
Elisabeth died of tuberculosis in Bolzano on Christmas Day, 1856.

== Issue ==
With Rainer she had eight children:

- Maria Carolina (1821–1844)
- Adelaide (3 June 1822 – 20 January 1855), who became the wife of Victor Emmanuel II, King of Sardinia from 1849 to 1861 and subsequently King of Italy.
- Leopold Ludwig (6 June 1823 – 24 May 1898)
- Ernest Charles (8 August 1824 – 4 April 1899)
- Sigismund Leopold (7 January 1826 – 15 December 1891)
- Rainer Ferdinand (11 January 1827 – 27 January 1913)
- Heinrich Anton (9 May 1828 – 30 November 1891)
- Maximilian Charles (16 January 1830 – 16 March 1839)
