= Archduke Rainer of Austria (1783–1853) =

Austrian archduke

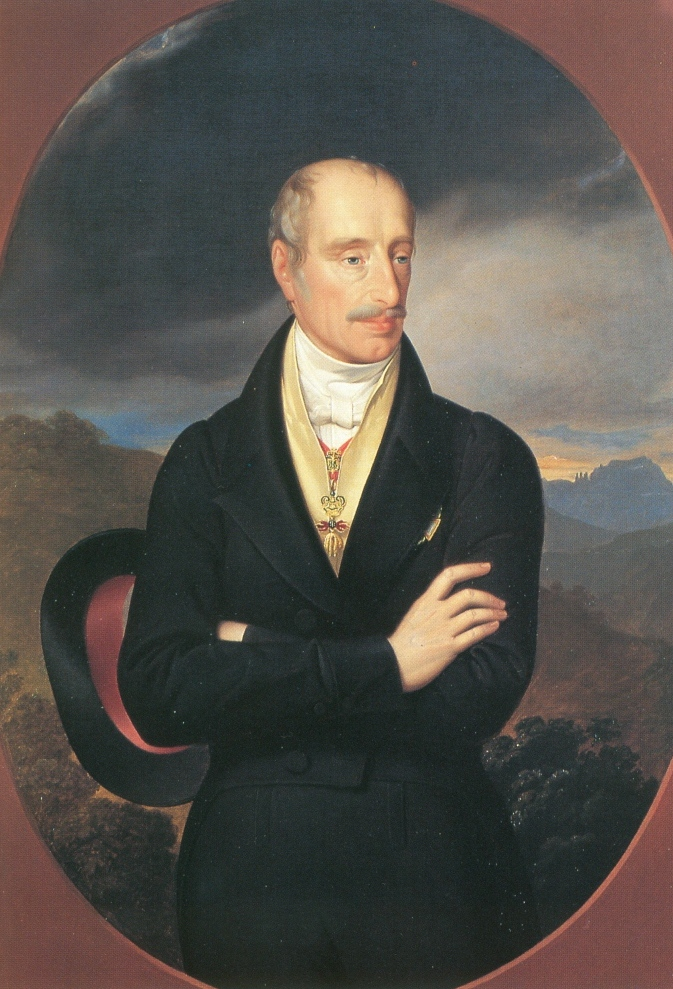
- Portrait attributed to Luigi Pedrazzi, c. 1840–50

Viceroy of Lombardy–Venetia
- In office: 3 January 1818 – 8 June 1848
- Monarch: Francis I Ferdinand I
- Predecessor: Archduke Anton Victor
- Successor: Josef Radetzky (Governor-General)
- Born: 30 September 1783; Pisa, Grand Duchy of Tuscany
- Died: 16 January 1853 (aged 69); Bolzano, Austrian Empire
- Burial: Bolzano Cathedral
- Spouse: Princess Elisabeth of Savoy (m. 1820)
- Issue Detail: Adelaide, Queen of Sardinia; Archduke Leopold; Archduke Ernst; Archduke Sigismund; Archduke Rainer; Archduke Heinrich
Names
- Rainer Joseph Johann Michael Franz Hieronymus
- House: Habsburg-Lorraine
- Father: Leopold II, Holy Roman Emperor
- Mother: Maria Luisa of Spain

Archduke Rainer of Austria (30 September 1783 – 16 January 1853) was Viceroy of the Kingdom of Lombardy–Venetia from 1818 to 1848. He was also an Archduke of Austria, Prince Royal of Hungary and Bohemia.

== Biography ==
Rainer was a son of Emperor Leopold II and Empress Maria Louisa, and was thus a younger brother of Francis II, Holy Roman Emperor.

Although Rainer suffered from a mild form of epilepsy, this did not visibly interfere with his military career.

Rainer served as Viceroy of the Kingdom of Lombardy–Venetia from 1818 to 1848. The position made Rainer and his wife the head of the Austrian court at Milan. Rainer's politics were increasingly unpopular, the Italians resented him for their lack of political freedom and for collecting revenues with so little benefit to them.

Throughout the 1840s, the political situation worsened to such an extent that in 1847, Klemens von Metternich resurrected his 1817 plans for an Italian chancellery by sending his right-hand man Count Karl Ludwig von Ficquelmont to Milan as acting Chancellor of Lombardy–Venetia to reinvigorate Austrian rule while taking over Northern Italy's administration. But only a few months later, Ficquelmont was recalled to Vienna to assume the leadership of the Council of war as the Revolutions of 1848 started.

Archduke Rainer's mistakes as well as the lack of understanding between Rainer and Feldmarschall Graf Radetzky, were blamed for the disasters of the Italian Revolution of 1848.

== Marriage and children ==
He married in Prague on 28 May 1820 Princess Elisabeth of Savoy (13 April 1800 – 25 December 1856). She was the sister of the Prince of Carignano, who would in 1831 become King of Sardinia as King Charles Albert. She was also a granddaughter of the late former duke of the Baltic Duchy of Courland and Semigallia.

Children included:

- Maria Carolina (6 February 1821 – 23 Jan 1844) – unmarried, no issue
- Adelaide (3 June 1822 – 20 January 1855) – wife of Victor Emmanuel II, from 1849 king of Sardinia
- Leopold (6 June 1823 – 24 May 1898) – Oberkommandant der Marine ('High Commander of the Navy') from 1864 to 1868
- Ernst (8 August 1824 – 4 April 1899), Feldmarschalleutnant
- Sigismund (7 January 1826 – 15 December 1891), Feldmarschalleutnant
- Rainer (11 January 1827 – 27 January 1913) – Austrian Minister President 1859–61; his visit to the Hotel Greif in Wels is commemorated by a wall plaque there. Married Archduchess Maria Karoline of Austria (1825-1915). No issue.
- Heinrich (9 May 1828 – 30 November 1891), Feldmarschalleutnant
- Maximilian (16 January 1830 – 16 March 1839) – died in childhood

The Revolution of 1848 forced Rainer and Elisabeth from the court at Milan; when the insurrection was quelled, Radetzky was named Rainer's successor as Viceroy. Although his children, except Adelheid, are buried in the Imperial Crypt in Vienna, he and his wife are buried at the Maria Himmelfahrtskirche in Bolzano.

Through his daughter Adelaide, Rainer is an ancestor of the entire royal family of Italy which reigned from 1861 to 1946.

== Ancestry ==
Ancestors of Archduke Rainer of Austria (1783–1853)

8. Leopold, Duke of Lorraine
4. Francis I, Holy Roman Emperor
9. Élisabeth Charlotte d'Orléans
2. Leopold II, Holy Roman Emperor
10. Charles VI, Holy Roman Emperor
5. Maria Theresa of Austria
11. Elisabeth Christine of Brunswick
1. Archduke Rainer of Austria
12. Philip V of Spain
6. Charles III of Spain
13. Elisabeth Farnese
3. Maria Luisa of Spain
14. Augustus III of Poland
7. Maria Amalia of Saxony
15. Maria Josepha of Austria
