= Imperial and Royal Highness =

Style; mode of address

Imperial and Royal Highness (abbreviation HI&RH) is a style possessed by someone who either through birth or marriage holds two individual styles, Imperial Highness and Royal Highness. His/Her Imperial Highness is a style used by members of an imperial family to denote imperial – as opposed to royal – status to show that the holder is descended from an emperor rather than a king or queen. Holders of the style Imperial Highness generally rank above holders of the style Royal Highness.

A primary example of the contemporary usage of this style is the Belgian royal family. HI&RH Lorenz, Archduke of Austria-Este, Prince of Belgium, is a member of the Imperial House of Habsburg-Lorraine by birth, but upon his marriage to HRH Princess Astrid of Belgium, he also became a member of the Belgian royal family by marriage. As such, their children currently use the styles HI&RH as members of both the royal family of Belgium and the Imperial House of Habsburg-Lorraine.

== Brazilian use ==
In 1909, the members of the Orléans-Braganza branch of the Brazilian imperial family signed an agreement with Prince Philippe, Duke of Orléans (1869–1926), the head of the House of Orléans (the former royal family of France), called the "family pact". By this agreement, all of them were counted in the French line of succession, being properly styled "Royal Highness". Combined with the earlier style "Imperial Highness", determined in the Imperial Constitution of 1824, since then on the head of the family (named Head of the Imperial House), the heir to the headship (named Prince Imperial), and the eldest son of the Imperial Prince (Prince of Grão-Pará) uses the style "Imperial and Royal Highness". Other princes/princesses of the Orléans-Braganza branch (Prince/Princess of Orléans-Braganza) uses the style Royal Highness, and the members of the Saxe-Coburg-Braganza branch (Prince/Princess of Saxe-Coburg-Braganza) kept the style Highness.

== German use ==
The style was also used by the eldest son of the German Emperor who was the German Crown Prince and Crown Prince of Prussia, and also by his wife who was crown princess. It may be used for the head of the House of Hohenzollern out of respect; however, like all members of former German noble families, in law he is considered to be an ordinary citizen of Germany, and as such holds no title officially.

== Habsburg use ==
The style is used by members of the Habsburg dynasty, who use the titles Prince Imperial and Archduke of Austria and Prince Royal of Bohemia and Hungary. One contemporary example of this is HI&RH Lorenz, Archduke of Austria-Este, Prince of Belgium, who is a member of the Imperial House of Habsburg-Lorraine by birth and of the Belgian royal family by marriage. The Habsburgs, who have held the elective Crown of the Holy Roman Empire for centuries, only began to use the style Imperial and Royal Highness with the establishment of the hereditary Austrian Empire in 1804; prior to this, non-reigning members of the dynasty were styled as Royal Highnesses.

== Portuguese use ==
During the reign of Emperor Pedro I of Brazil, King John VI of Portugal, Pedro's father, was created titular Emperor of Brazil by a provision of the Treaty on the recognition of the independence of Brazil, that was ratified and entered into force on 15 November 1825. On the same date, King John VI issued a Charter of Law to change his royal titles, so as to include his courtesy title of Emperor among them. King John VI would use the style Imperial and Royal Highness until his death on 10 March 1826.

King Pedro IV of Portugal also used the styling, having also been the first Emperor of Brazil as Pedro I.

== Personal use ==
Grand Duchess Elena Vladimirovna of Russia, upon her marriage to Prince Nicholas of Greece, was styled Her Imperial and Royal Highness.

Grand Duchess Maria Alexandrovna of Russia was alternately styled Her Imperial and Royal Highness and Her Royal and Imperial Highness upon her marriage to Prince Alfred, Duke of Edinburgh, the second son of Queen Victoria.

== See also ==
- Imperial and Royal Majesty

== Sources ==
- Heraldica – Styles FAQ
