= Franciszka Krasińska =

Polish noblewoman

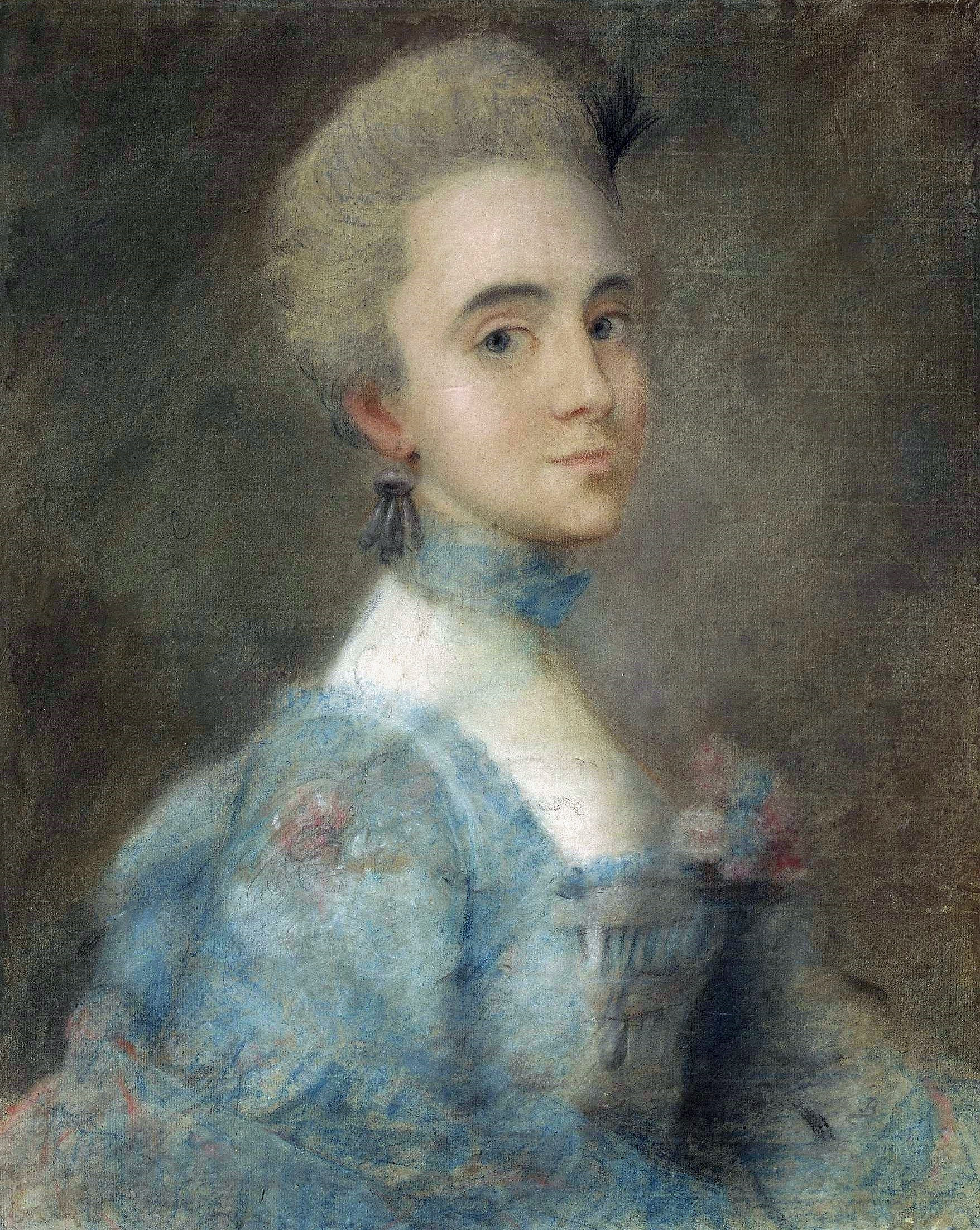

Duchess Consort of Courland and Semigallia
- Tenure: 1758–1763
- Born: 9 March 1742; Maleszowa, Polish–Lithuanian Commonwealth
- Died: 30 April 1796 (aged 53); Dresden, Electorate of Saxony, Holy Roman Empire
- Burial: St. Marienstern Abbey, Panschwitz-Kuckau
- Spouse: Charles, Duke of Courland
- Issue: Maria Christina, Princess of Carignan
- House: Krasiński (by birth); Wettin (by marriage)
- Father: Stanisław Krasiński
- Mother: Aniela Humięcka

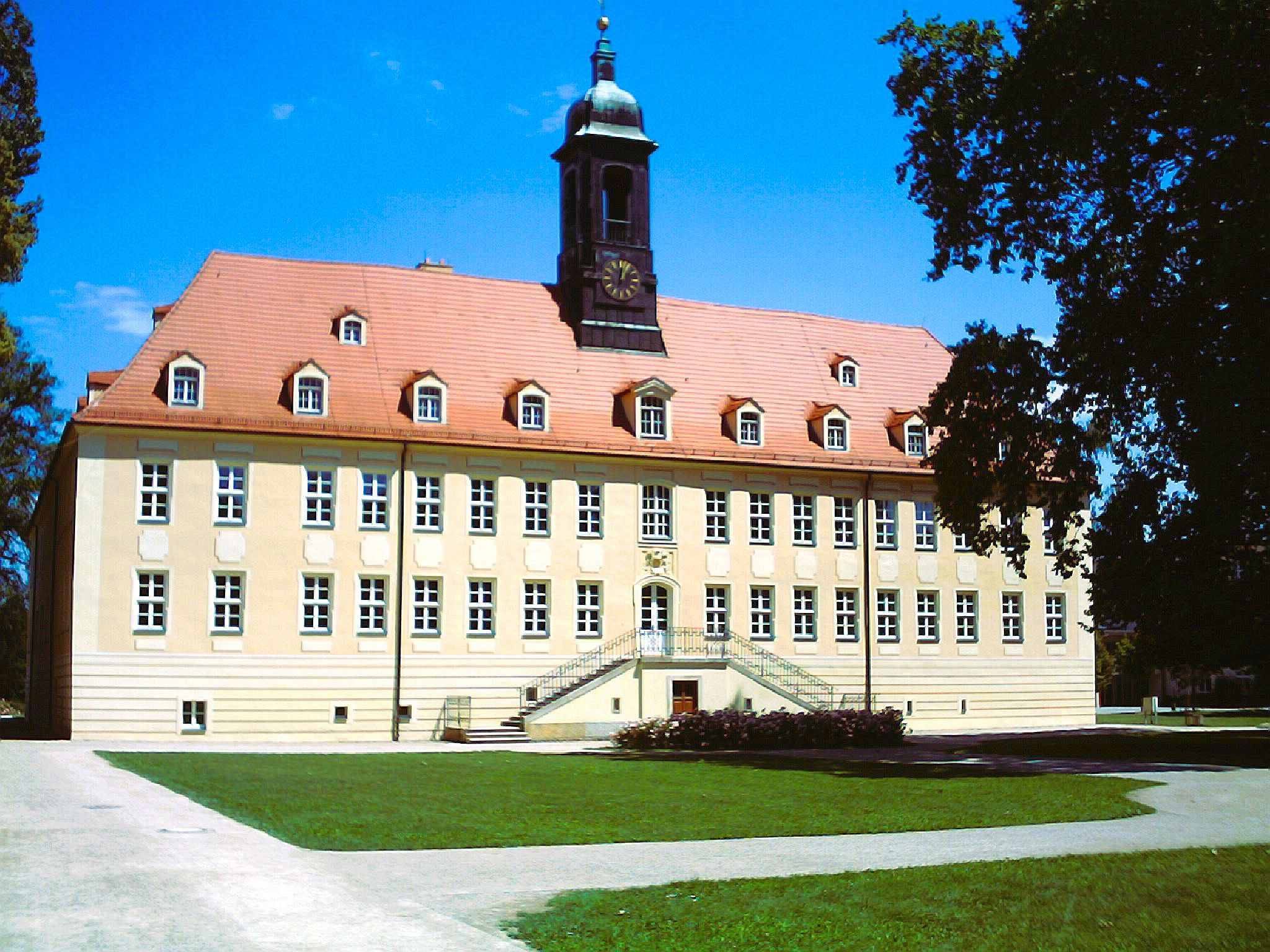
Elsterwerda Castle in southwestern Brandenburg, where Franciszka spent her last years

Countess Franciszka Krasińska (9 March 1742 in Maleszowa – 30 April 1796 in Dresden) was a Polish noblewoman and wife of Charles of Saxony, Duke of Courland, the son of King Augustus III of Poland.

== Life ==
She was the third of four daughters born to Polish nobles, Count Stanisław Korwin Krasiński, and Aniela Humięcka.

Franciszka was born on the family's Maleszowa estate. The Krasińskis attended the royal court in Warsaw, where she would eventually meet her future husband, Charles of Saxony, Duke of Courland. Franciszka and Charles reportedly fell mutually in love when she was just 15. In 1757, they asked her family to support their plan to marry. Her father and her uncle by marriage, Prince Antoni Lubomirski, both supported their wish, especially as Charles was in line to become Duke of Courland, which happened in 1758. Her paternal aunt, Princess Zofia Lubomirska, on the other hand, took a sober attitude and commented that her brother and husband "... are convinced that his daughter will one day rule... I cannot agree with what he writes", as she did not believe in Charles's honest intentions. Besides, in her view his family would not allow such a marriage and he would have to abandon her niece.

=== Morganatic marriage ===
On 25 March 1760 Franciszka Krasińska finally married Prince Charles of Saxony. Although she was of noble birth, she did not belong to a reigning or immediate dynasty, so she and Charles married in secret. As a result, she was not entitled to share his dynastic title.

Her aunt Zofia now won over, demanded together with August Czartoryski, that Charles openly recognize Franciszka as his legal wife. After the death of Franciszka's compliant father in 1762, aunt Zofia's husband, Prince Antoni Lubomirski, became legal guardian of her "officially unmarried" niece and her three sisters. Zofia Lubomirska was then in a position to have more influence over Charles in the matter. In January 1764, during the Interregnum, Charles did officially recognize the marriage, and Zofia Lubomirska tried to negotiate with him to have him announce his candidacy for the Polish throne, which would have given Franciszka the chance to become queen. In the event he declined.

As the young couple lived separate lives, Franciszka Krasińska, now Wettin, often stayed with her aunt and uncle. She visited Warsaw with her aunt during the Radom Confederation and accompanied her on a trip to Zofia's estate in Opole, where Franciszka was reunited with Charles in 1775. Later that year, in response to Charles's own persistence and that of other supporters at the Saxon royal court, the marriage was finally recognized, though only as a morganatic marriage—an alien concept in the Republic of Two Nations, where all nobles counted as members of a single class. However Franciszka's hereditary title of Princess was arranged and granted in 1775 by Emperor Joseph II, but the title was not recognized by the Prussian court. Franciszka and her daughter moved to Saxony to live with Charles in his castle. She was accorded an annuity by the Polish Sejm.

The couple had two daughters: Maria Theresia (born and died 1767) and Maria Christina (1770–1851), who went on to become grandmother to Victor Emmanuel II, crowned King of Italy in 1861.

Franciszka probably died of breast cancer.

== In fiction ==
Franciszka became the subject of an historical novel by Klementyna Hoffmanowa.
