= Charles, Duke of Courland =

German prince (1733-1796)

Karl Christian Joseph
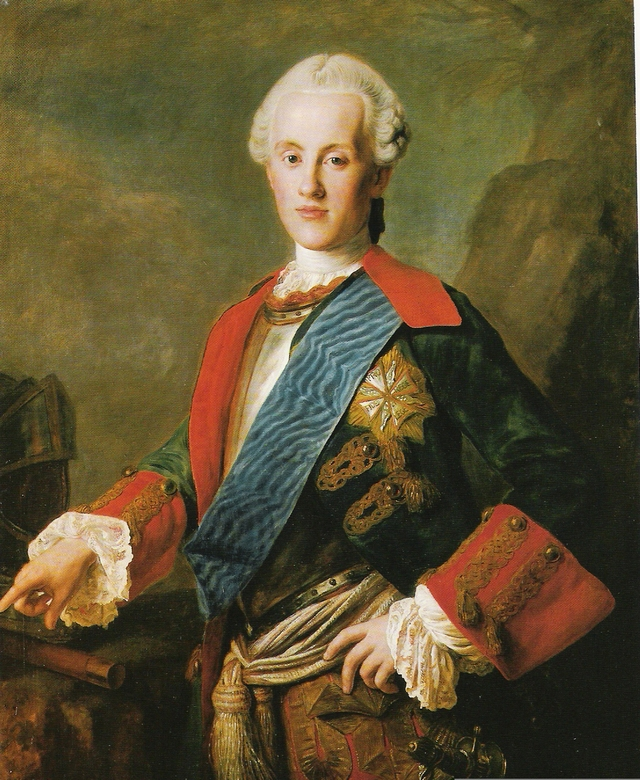
- Portrait by Pietro Rotari, 1755

Duke of Courland and Semigallia
- Reign: 1758–1763
- Predecessor: Louis Ernest
- Successor: Ernst Johann
- Born: 13 July 1733; Dresden, Electorate of Saxony, Holy Roman Empire
- Died: 16 June 1796 (aged 62); Dresden, Electorate of Saxony, Holy Roman Empire
- Burial: St. Marienstern Abbey, Panschwitz-Kuckau
- Spouse: Franciszka Krasińska
- Issue: Maria Christina, Princess of Carignano
Names
- German: Karl Christian Joseph Ignaz Eugen Franz Xaver
- House: Wettin
- Father: Augustus III of Poland
- Mother: Maria Josepha of Austria

Prince Karl Christian Joseph of Saxony, also anglicized as Charles of Saxony (13 July 1733 – 16 June 1796), was a German prince of the House of Wettin. He was Duke of Courland and Semigallia from 1758 to 1763. Born in Dresden, he was the fifth son of Augustus III, King of Poland and Elector of Saxony, and Maria Josepha of Austria. He is an ancestor of the Italian House of Savoy.

== Life ==
=== Causes of his election as Duke of Courland ===
The Duchy of Courland and Semigallia had been created in 1561 by Gotthard Kettler, last master of the Livonian Order, and had been ruled by his descendants until the dynasty died out in 1737. Then, Empress Anna of Russia herself the widow of Frederick William the penultimate Duke of Courland, managed to place her lover, Ernst Johann von Biron, on the Ducal throne of Courland. Empress Anna died only three years later and was succeeded by her infant grand-nephew Ivan VI, at which time von Biron had become regent of Russia. His regency lasted only three weeks. Von Biron was hated by the Russian aristocracy because of his extravagances and autocratic behaviour and also for the arrogance he had shown during Empress Anna's lifetime, as her lover. The young Tsar's mother, Anna Leopoldovna and the influential minister Burkhard Christoph von Munnich conspired to remove von Biron from office, confiscated his estates and exiled him to Siberia in the winter of 1740-41. Only months later, in November 1741, Russia witnessed another coup which brought Empress Elizabeth, a cousin of the late Empress Anna, to the throne. The child-Tsar Ivan VI, his mother Anna Leopoldovna and all other members of their family were arrested. Now, certainly, the new Tsarina Elisabeth granted a pardon to von Biron, allowed him to return from Siberia and ordered him to live in Yaroslavl. However, because of her fear that he could again return to great power as he had done during Empress Anna's reign, she refused to restore his former privileges or the Duchy of Courland.

The matter of who would be Duke of Courland remained in stalemate for more than sixteen years. Finally, under pressure from Saxony and Poland, to sort out the selection of a new duke, the local nobility chose in 1758 their favoured candidate, the son of the Polish king, Prince Charles Christian. The young prince had previously travelled to St. Petersburg, from where came the agreement of Tsarina Elisabeth, confirming the plan.

=== Duke of Courland and Semigallia ===
Most of the Protestant Courland aristocracy harboured doubts about Charles — largely because they feared a Roman Catholic Duke would exert his influence in favour of the Polish Roman Catholic State — and tried to limit Charles’s powers by formulating a contract of electoral surrender, in case he exceeded his remit. Before these negotiations could come to fruition, his father appointed him Duke on 10 November 1758 and formally invested him on 8 January 1759 along with the territory of Semigallia. Thereupon Charles, who had signed only a rather vague assurance about religious observance and aristocratic privileges, travelled to Courland and, on 29 March 1759, solemnly entered the capital of his Duchy, Mitau. After the Courland Diet (Landtag) and the States had met, they lost any hope of obtaining a stronger undertaking from Charles. Nevertheless, they still favoured him. Appropriately, many aristocrats refused to pay homage on the new Duke’s appointment on 3 November 1759 and instead took their protest to Warsaw and St. Petersburg.

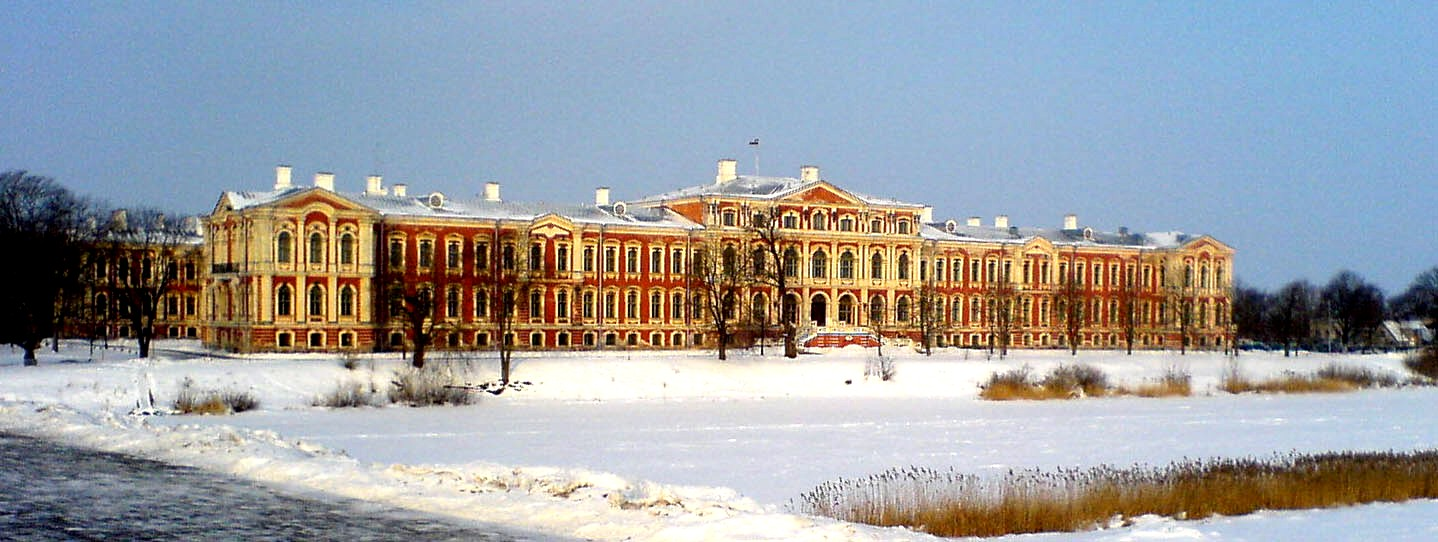
Jelgava Palace (German: Schloss Mitau), built by Francesco Bartolomeo Rastrelli, looks over the Lielupe.

The Duke was fond of the good life and lived in remarkable style in Schloss Mitau. He entertained the aristocracy with parties and hunts, whereby he was able to increase his popularity. Also, he joined a Freemason's lodge, very fashionable in Poland at that time, and thus protected himself from the aristocrats with whom the nobility were in agreement. He left domestic politics, however, in the hands of his Country administrator (Landhofmeister), Otto Christoph von der Howen (1699-1775).

=== Renunciation of the Duchy and later life ===
In July 1762, Catherine — who had disapproved of Duke Charles because of his apparent lack of interest in the welfare of his subjects — took the Russian throne in a coup d'état. She allowed the now entirely rehabilitated von Biron to return from exile and put substantial diplomatic pressure on Saxony, with the aim of restoring him to his old position as Duke. Finally, an ailing Augustus III — not only because of his declining health but also as a consequence of the Seven Years' War — accepted the fate of his son and denied him his support. Without it, Charles was forced to renounce the Duchy in 1763, and returned to Saxony.

His hopes of regaining the Duchy of Courland evaporated after the shortly ensuing death of his father and the Saxon Electors' loss of the Polish Crown. Thereafter, Charles lived in Dresden and dedicated himself to hunting on the Annaburger plain.

Charles died in Dresden aged sixty-two. He was buried at St. Marienstern Abbey (Kloster Marienstern) in Panschwitz-Kuckau.

== Morganatic marriage and issue ==
On 25 March 1760 in Warsaw, Charles had secretly married Countess Franciszka Krasińska, third daughter of Count Stanisław Korwin Krasiński (1717–1762) and his wife, Aniela Humięcka (b. 1715). Because the beautiful Franciszka did not belong to a ruling dynasty or immediate noble family, the marriage was deemed morganatic in Saxony, though not in Poland. In response to his persistence and that of supporters in the Saxon court, in June 1775 his wife was granted by Emperor Joseph II the title of Princess. The couple had one daughter:

1. Maria Christina Albertina Carolina (born Dresden, 7 December 1770 - died Paris, 24 November 1851), married firstly on 24 October 1797 to Carlo Emanuele of Savoy, Prince of Carignano, and after his death she was married on 1 February 1816 to Jules Maximilien Thibaut, Prince de Montléart (1787-1865).

Through his surviving daughter's first marriage, Charles became an ancestor of the Italian Royal Family that reigned from 1861 to 1946.

== Ancestry ==
Ancestors of Charles, Duke of Courland

8. John George III, Elector of Saxony
4. Augustus II of Poland
9. Anna Sophie of Denmark
2. Augustus III of Poland
10. Christian Ernst, Margrave of Brandenburg-Bayreuth
5. Christiane Eberhardine of Brandenburg-Bayreuth
11. Sophie Louise of Württemberg
1. Charles, Duke of Courland
12. Leopold I, Holy Roman Emperor
6. Joseph I, Holy Roman Emperor
13. Eleonore Magdalene of Neuburg
3. Maria Josepha of Austria
14. John Frederick, Duke of Brunswick
7. Wilhelmina Amalia of Brunswick
15. Benedicta Henrietta of the Palatinate

Regnal titles
Preceded by Council of the Duke	Duke of Courland; 1758–1763	Succeeded by Ernst Johann von Biron
