= Princess Maria Christina of Saxony (1770–1851) =

Maria Christina
- Princess of Carignano; Princess of Montléart; Marquise of Rumont
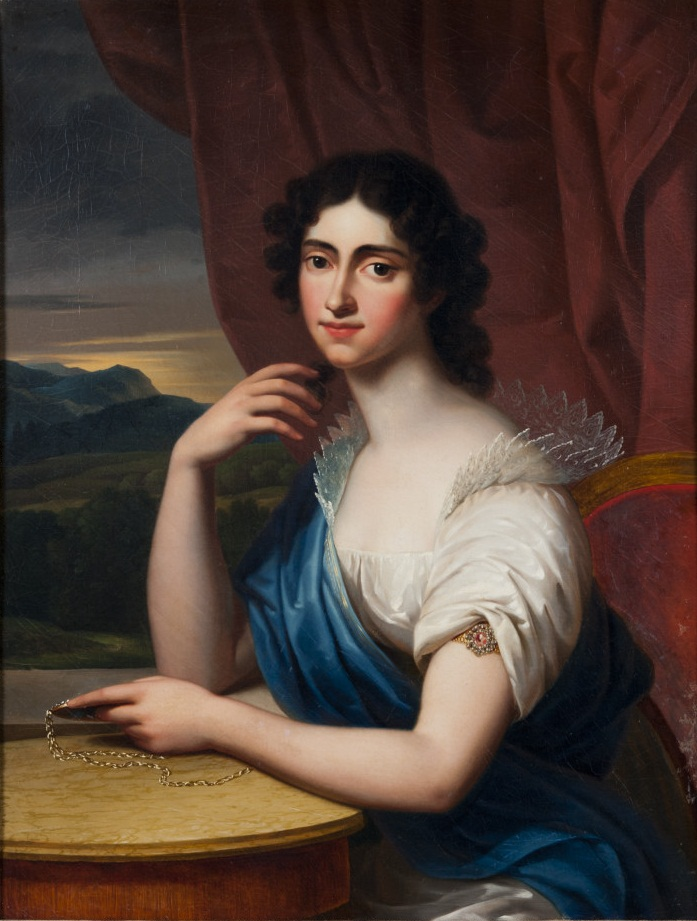
- Born: 7 December 1770; Dresden, Saxony
- Died: 24 November 1851 (aged 80); Paris, France
- Burial: Marienstern Abbey, Mühlberg, Brandenburg, Germany
- Spouse: Charles Emmanuel, Prince of Carignano (m. 1797; died 1800) Julius Maximilian, Prince of Montléart (m. 1810)
- Issue: Charles Albert, King of Sardinia; Elisabeth, Archduchess of Austria; Jules Maurice, Prince of Montléart; Louise Bathilde de Montléart; Berthe Marie de Montléart; Frédérique Augusta Marie de Montléart; Marguerite Julia de Montléart
Names
- Maria Christina Albertina Carolina
- House: Wettin
- Father: Prince Charles of Saxony, Duke of Courland
- Mother: Countess Franciszka Korwin-Krasińska

Maria Christina of Saxony (Maria Christina Albertina Carolina; 7 December 1770 – 24 November 1851) was a Princess of Saxony and by birth a member of the House of Wettin. She was the Princess of Carignano and later Princess of Montléart by marriage.

== Early life ==
Maria Christina was the only surviving child of Prince Charles of Saxony, Duke of Courland, himself son of King Augustus III of Poland, and his wife, Countess Franciszka Korwin-Krasińska. Her parents married secretly in Warsaw in 1760. The marriage was considered morganatic in Saxony. Her mother was created a Princess (Princess Franziska Krasińska Wettin) in 1775 by Emperor Emperor Joseph II.

== Biography ==
Her education was in the hands of several private tutors and governesses. She learned philosophy, geography, literature, music, dance, and was taught several languages (German, Italian, French, Polish, and English).

In Turin on 24 October 1797, she married Charles Emmanuel, Prince of Carignano (died 1800). They had two children:

- Charles Albert of Savoy-Carignano (2 October 1798 – 28 July 1849), King of Sardinia in 1831, who married Maria Theresa of Austria and had issue.
- Princess Elisabetta of Savoy-Carignano (13 April 1800 – 25 December 1856), who married Archduke Rainer of Austria and had issue.

Three years after his marriage Charles Emmanuel died in a French prison.

On 1 February 1810 in Paris she married Julius Maximilian de Montléart, 6th Marquis of Rumont, 1st Prince of Montléart (1787–1865), the son of Marie Louis de Montléart, Comte de Montléart (1753-1837) and his wife, Marie Louise de Rouvroy de Saint-Simon (1763-1834), younger sister of Claude Henri de Rouvroy, Comte de Saint-Simon. They had five children, one son and four daughters:

- Jules Maurice, 2nd Prince of Montléart (28 November 1807 – 16 March 1887), legitimized after his parents' marriage.
- Louise Bathilde de Montléart (20 January 1809 – 1823), legitimized after her parents' marriage; died young.
- Berthe Maria de Montléart (1811–1831), died young.
- Frédérique Auguste Marie Xavérine Cunégonde Julie de Montléart (11 November 1814 – 30 March 1885 in Krzyszkowice, by suicide).
- Marguerite Julia de Montléart (1822–1832), died young.

In 1824 Maria Christina and her second husband bought and restored the Schloss Wilhelminenberg in the district of Gallitzinberg.

Maria Christina died in Paris on 24 November 1851, aged 80. She is buried in the Marienstern Abbey.

== Ancestors ==
Ancestors of Princess Maria Christina of Saxony (1770–1851)

8. Augustus II of Poland
4. Augustus III of Poland
9. Christiane Eberhardine of Bayreuth
2. Charles, Duke of Courland
10. Joseph I, Holy Roman Emperor
5. Maria Josepha of Austria
11. Wilhelmine Amalie of Brunswick
1. Maria Christina of Saxony
12. Aleksander Krasiński
6. Stanisław Krasiński
13. Salomea Trzcińska
3. Franciszka Krasińska
14. Stefan Humięcki
7. Aniela Humięcka
15. Katarzyna Krosnowska
