= Charles Emmanuel, Prince of Carignano =

Charles Emmanuel of Savoy
- Prince of Carignano
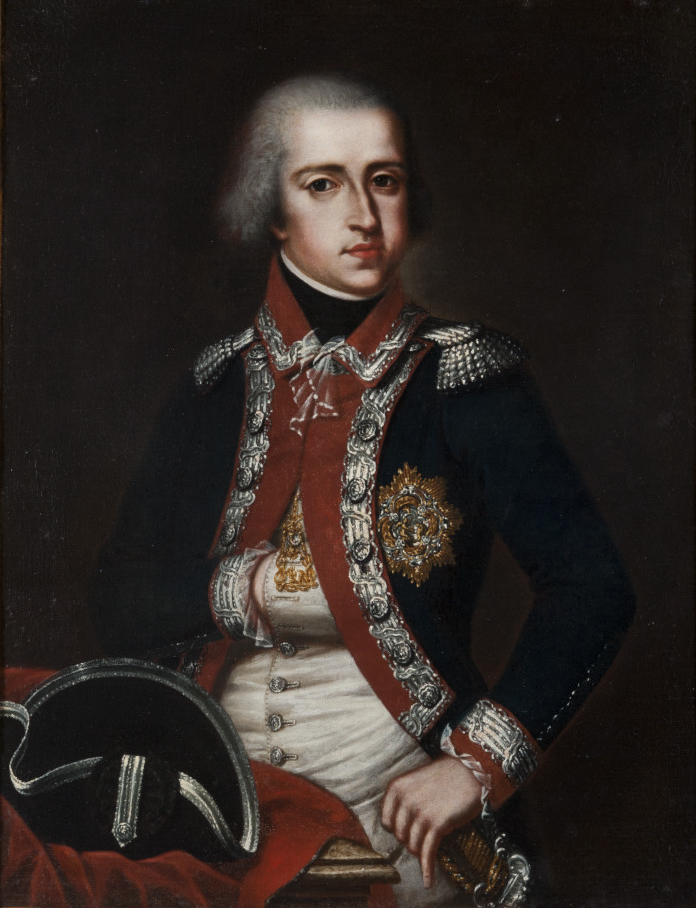

Prince of Carignano
- Reign: 10 September 1780 – 16 August 1800
- Predecessor: Victor Amadeus II
- Successor: Charles Albert
- Born: 24 October 1770; Palazzo Carignano, Turin
- Died: 16 August 1800 (aged 29); Paris, France
- Burial: Royal Basilica of Superga
- Spouse: Maria Christina of Saxony (m. 1797)
- Issue Detail: Charles Albert, King of Sardinia; Elisabeth, Archduchess of Austria
Names
- Carlo Emanuele di Savoia
- House: Savoy-Carignano
- Father: Victor Amadeus of Savoy
- Mother: Joséphine of Lorraine

Charles Emmanuel of Savoy, 6th Prince of Carignano (24 October 1770 – 16 August 1800) was a Prince of Savoy and later the Prince of Carignano between 1780 and 1800, and the paternal grandfather of Vittorio Emanuele II, the first king of a united Italy.

== Biography ==
He was a son of Victor Amadeus II, Prince of Carignano and Joséphine of Lorraine, and a fifth-generation descendant of Thomas Francis, Prince of Carignano, founder of the Carignano line of the House of Savoy. On 24 October 1797 he married in Turin Maria Christina of Saxony, daughter of Carl Christian Joseph of Saxony, Duke of Courland, himself son of Augustus III of Poland. They had two children.

Charles Emmanuel died three years after his marriage in a French prison. He had fought against the French in the War of the First Coalition, but had made peace with France after the abdication of Charles Emmanuel IV. Soon after he became a suspect and was imprisoned by the French in the Citadel of Turin. From there he was moved to Dijon and then to Chaillot in Paris, where he died. He was buried at the Basilica of Superga.

== Issue ==
- Prince Charles Albert of Savoy (1798–1849), Prince of Carignano, and King of Sardinia, married Archduchess Maria Theresa of Austria and had issue;
- Princess Elisabeth of Savoy (1800–1856), married Archduke Rainer of Austria and had issue.

== Ancestry ==
Ancestors of Charles Emmanuel, Prince of Carignano

16. Emmanuel Philibert, Prince of Carignano
8. Victor Amadeus I, Prince of Carignano
17. Maria Angela Caterina d'Este
4. Louis Victor, Prince of Carignano
18. Victor Amadeus II of Sardinia
9. Maria Vittoria of Savoy
19. Jeanne Baptiste d'Albert de Luynes
2. Victor Amadeus II, Prince of Carignano
20. William, Landgrave of Hesse-Rotenburg
10. Ernest Leopold, Landgrave of Hesse-Rotenburg
21. Countess Maria Anna of Löwenstein-Wertheim-Rochefort
5. Landgravine Christine of Hesse-Rotenburg
22. Maximilian Karl Albert, Prince of Löwenstein-Wertheim-Rochefort
11. Countess Eleonore of Löwenstein-Wertheim-Rochefort
23. Countess Maria Polyxena Khuen of Lichtenberg and Belasi
1. Charles Emmanuel of Savoy, Prince of Carignano
24. Henri, Count of Brionne
12. Louis, Prince of Lambesc
25. Marie Madeleine d'Éspinay
6. Louis, Prince of Brionne
26. Jacques Henri II de Durfort, Duke of Duras
13. Jeanne Henriette Marguerite de Durfort
27. Louise Madeleine Eschalard de La Marck
3. Princess Joséphine of Lorraine
28. Charles III, Prince of Guéméné
14. Charles, Prince of Rochefort
29. Charlotte Élisabeth de Cochefilet
7. Louise de Rohan
30. Eugène Marie de Béthisy, Marquis of Mézières
15. Eléonore Eugénie de Béthisy de Mézières
31. Eléonore Oglethorpe
