= Maria Caterina d'Este =

- Princess of Carignano
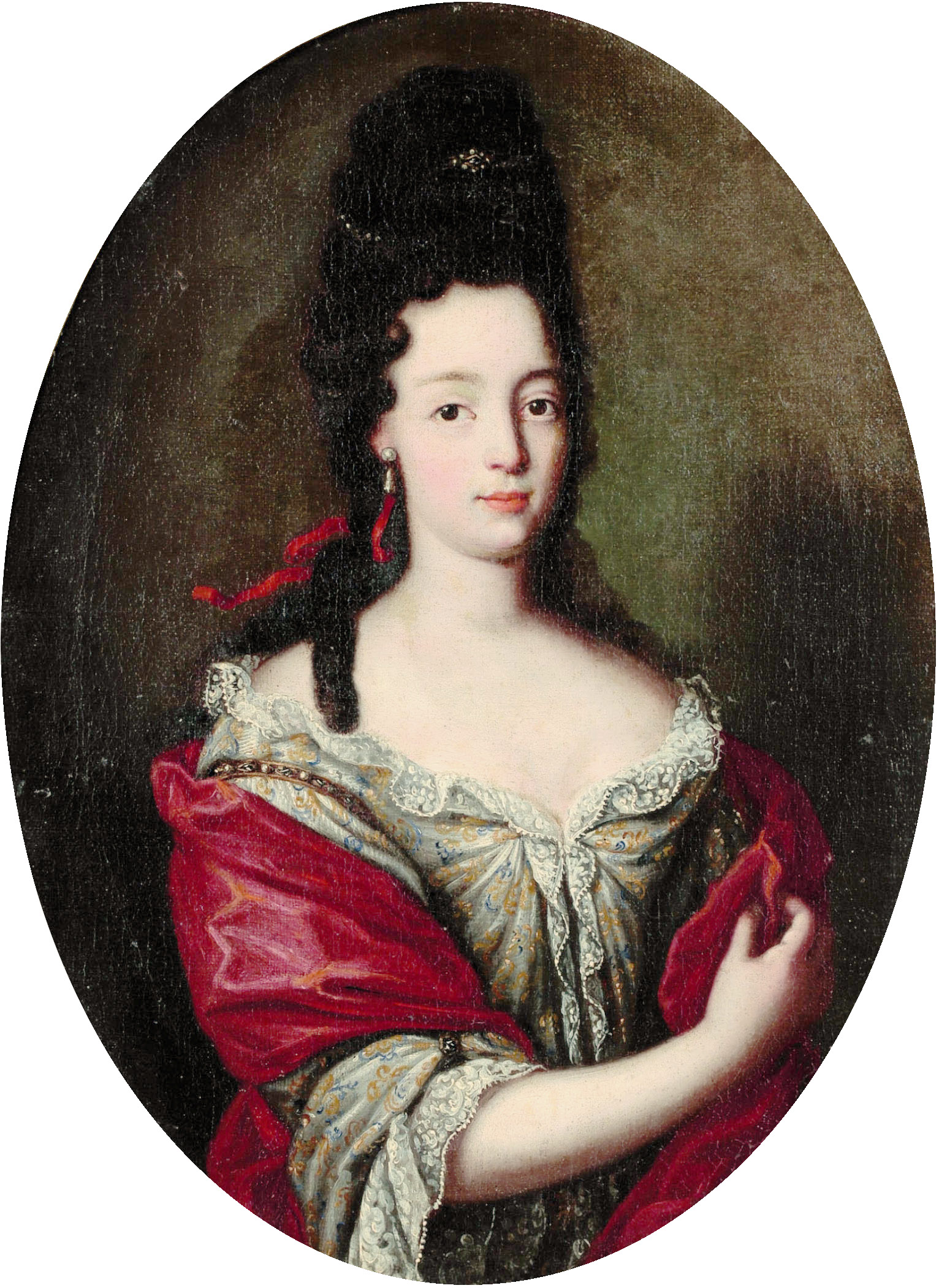
- Portrait by a follower of Hyacinthe Rigaud
- Born: 1 March 1656
- Died: 16 July 1722 (aged 66)
- Spouse: Emmanuel Philibert, Prince of Carignano (m. 1684; died 1709)
- Issue Detail: Victor Amadeus I, Prince of Carignano
Names
- Maria Angela Caterina d'Este
- House: Este
- Father: Borso d'Este
- Mother: Ippolita d'Este

Maria Angela Caterina d'Este (1 March 1656 – 16 July 1722) was an Italian-born Princess of Modena who was later the Princess of Carignano by marriage. She was the wife of Emmanuel Philibert of Savoy, Prince of Carignano. In France she was known as Angélique Catherine d'Este and in Modena and Savoy she was known as Maria Caterina d'Este.

== Biography ==
Born to the General Borso d'Este and his wife Ippolita d'Este, Caterina was the product of a marriage between niece and uncle, her father being a son of Cesare d'Este, Duke of Modena, and her mother a daughter of Prince Luigi d'Este, younger son of Cesare. As a member of the House of Este, she was a princess of Modena by birth, her father being the "founder" of a collateral line of the House of Este, the short lived House of Este-Scandiano. She was named after her paternal aunt, Princess Eleonora, who became a nun under the name of Sor Angela Caterina.

The youngest of seven children, she never knew her parents as her mother died shortly after her birth, while her father died a year later. After the death of their parents, Maria Angela and her siblings were put under the care of their grandfather/uncle, Prince Luigi. Her first cousins included Francesco I d'Este, Duke of Modena, Margherita d'Este, Duchess of Guastalla and the Duke of Mirandola. She was also a cousin of Isabella and Maria d'Este, two successive Duchesses of Parma.

At the time of her marriage, the princess was noted for her good looks and for having such a fine figure for one of her age at the time of her marriage.

With the permission of Victor Amadeus, Duke of Savoy, Emmanuel Philibert's cousin and ruler of Savoy, Emmanuel Philibert expressed his wishes to marry Caterina. Emmanuel Philibert was the son of the late Thomas Francis, Prince of Carignano and his French born wife, the domineering Marie de Bourbon. His sister was the Dowager Hereditary Princess of Baden-Baden, mother of the famous General Türkenlouis.

The match was greatly opposed by France, then under the rule of Louis XIV, as Louis XIV had wanted Emmanuel Philibert to marry a French princess as Emmanuel Philibert was the heir presumptive to the Duchy of Savoy.

A proxy ceremony took place in Modena, in which her unmarried brother Caesare Ignace d'Este acted as her husband to be. A private ceremony took place on 10 November 1684 at the Castle of Racconigi, the summer residence of the Princes of Carignano; the bride being 28 and the groom 56.

This wedding was important to the House of Savoy, but very poorly viewed by the kingdom of France for its lack of political connection. Louis subsequently banished Emmanuel Philibert and his new spouse from the French court.

Maria Angela's grandfather had accepted the offer of marriage as he and Emmanuel Philibert had had good relations.

Her husband died in 1709 making Caterina the dowager princess of Carignano. Her only surviving son Victor Amadeus succeeded as Prince of Carignano. She died at the age of 66.

== Issue ==
Maria Angela and her husband had four children. Their youngest child, Thomas Philippe, died young and unmarried:

- Princess Maria Isabella of Savoy (14 March 1687 – 2 May 1767)
- Princess Maria Vittoria of Savoy (12 February 1688 – 18 May 1763)
- Prince Victor Amadeus of Savoy (1 March 1690 – 4 April 1741)
- Prince Thomas Philippe Gaetano of Savoy (10 May 1692 – 12 Sep 1715)

== Ancestry ==
Ancestors of Maria Caterina d'Este

16. Alfonso I d'Este, Duke of Modena
8. Alfonso d'Este, Lord of Montecchio
17. Laura Dianti
4. Cesare d'Este, Duke of Modena
18. Francesco Maria della Rovere, Duke of Urbino
9. Giulia della Rovere
19. Eleonor Gonzaga
2. Borso d'Este
20. Giovanni de' Medici
10. Cosimo I de' Medici, Grand Duke of Tuscany
21. Maria Salviati
5. Virginia de' Medici
22. Antonio Martelli
11. Camilla Martelli
23. Fiammetta Soderini
1. Maria Caterina d'Este
24. Alfonso d'Este, Lord of Montecchio =8
12. Cesare d'Este, Duke of Modena =4
25. Giulia della Rovere =9
6. Luigi d'Este, Lord of Montecchio and Scandiano
26. Cosimo I de' Medici, Grand Duke of Tuscany =10
13. Virginia de' Medici =5
27. Camilla Martelli =11
3. Ippolita d'Este
