= Borso d'Este (1605–1657) =

Italian general (1605–1657)

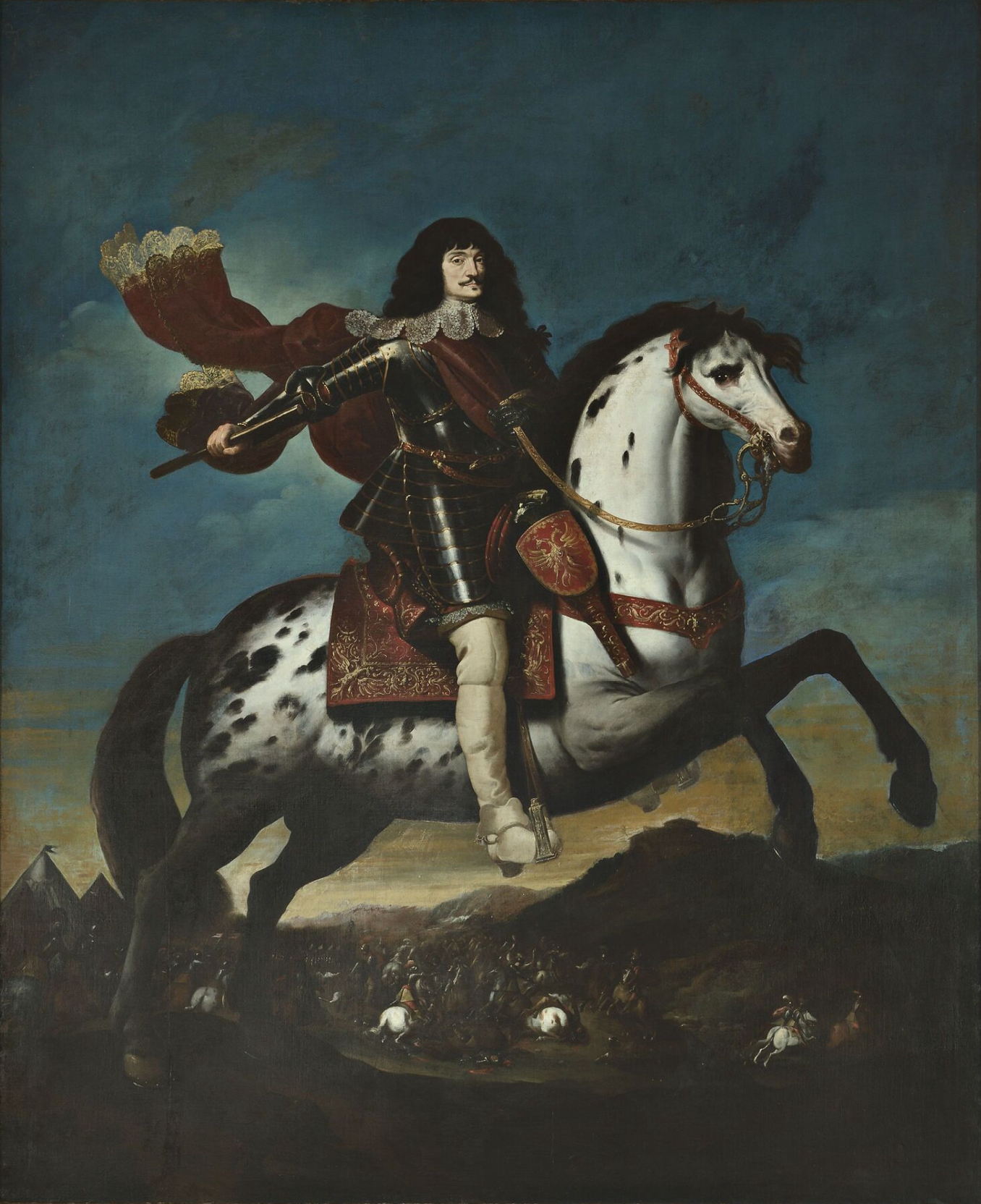
- Born: 1605; Modena
- Died: December 28, 1657; Castel San Giovanni
- Spouse: Ippolita d'Este (m. 1647; died 1656)
- Issue: Luigi II, Lord of Scandiano; Foresto, Lord of Montecchio; Cesare Ignazio, Lord of Montecchio; Giulia Teresa d'Este; Maria Angela Caterina, Princess of Carignano
- House: Este
- Father: Cesare d'Este, Duke of Modena
- Mother: Virginia de' Medici

Borso d'Este (1605 – 28 December 1657) was an Italian general and a member of the ducal House of Este. He was the son of Cesare d'Este, Duke of Modena and Virginia de' Medici.

== Biography ==
Born in Modena, he was the fifth son and eighth child of Cesare d'Este, Duke of Modena and Virginia de' Medici, daughter of Cosimo I de' Medici, Grand Duke of Tuscany. His eldest brother, Alfonso, became duke in 1628. He had another four brothers — Luigi, Lord of Montecchio and Scandiano; Ippolito; Niccolò; and Foresto — as well as four sisters, Giulia, Laura, Caterina, and Anna Eleonora, all of whom survived childhood.

From birth he was destined for a career in the Church, and in 1622 he was made Abbot Commendatory in the Abbey of SS. Leonardo and Apollonius of Canossa. However, he renounced his religious habit three years later in order to follow a military career. He moved to the Holy Roman Empire, where he attended a military academy and joined the Imperial Army. In 1632, Borso was put in charge of an infantry regiment in the Battle of Lützen. In 1634, he fought in the Battle of Nördlingen. In 1640, he was summoned back to the Este territories by his nephew Francesco I, Duke of Modena to fight against Spanish troops from the Duchy of Milan. In 1641, he bought the Ducal Palace of Rivalta and during the next three years the palace was renovated and enlarged.

Borso fell in love with his niece Ippolita, the illegitimate daughter of his brother Luigi, Lord of Montecchio and Scandiano. The marriage negotiations caused a big scandal in the Este court, not only because the couple were uncle and niece, but also because Ippolita was an illegitimate daughter and she was not of enough rank to marry a member of the House of Este. However, Borso was determined to marry Ippolita and his brother Luigi facilitated this by legitimizing his daughter.

On April 24, 1647, Ippolita was legitimized by Duke Francesco. A papal dispensation from Pope Innocent X was necessary due to the kinship of the future spouses. Borso and Ippolita were then married in a ceremony in Scandiano. That same year, Borso bought half of the Marquisate of Scandiano from his brother.

The marriage was a happy one, and the couple spent most of their time in the Ducal Palace of Rivalta. Ippolita died in 1656, shortly after the birth of their last child, Maria Angela Caterina. Borso himself would die a year later, aged 51 or 52. Their five surviving children were put under the care of his brother Luigi, who was also the children's grandfather.

== Issue ==
Borso and Ippolita had seven children, of whom two died in childhood. They founded a cadet branch of the House of Este, known as the short-lived House of Este-Scandiano. As none of their sons married or left heirs, the line became extinct.

- Luigi (1648–1698), Lord of Scandiano; died unmarried and without issue.
- Foresto Francesco (1652–1725), Lord of Montecchio; died unmarried and without issue.
- Cesare Ignazio (1653–1713), succeeded his brother Foresto as Lord of Montecchio; died unmarried and without issue.
- Giulia Teresa (21 May 1654–?), died unmarried and without issue.
- Maria Angela Caterina (1656–1722), married in 1684 to Emmanuel Philibert, Prince of Carignano (1628–1709) and had issue, including Victor Amadeus I, Prince of Carignano.
