= Carignano =

Carignano may refer to:

== Places ==
- Carignano, Piedmont, a municipality in the Metropolitan City of Turin, Italy
- Palazzo Carignano, a historical building in the centre of Turin, Italy
- Teatro Carignano, a theatre in Turin, Italy
- Carignano, a district in Genoa, Italy

== People ==
- House of Savoy-Carignano, a branch of the House of Savoy
- Princess of Carignano, wife of a Prince of Carignano of the House of Savoy
- César Carignano, Argentine retired footballer
- Giovanni da Carignano, priest and a pioneering cartographer from Genoa
- Silvia Carignano, Italian former ice hockey player

== Other uses ==
- Carignano (grape), the wine grape

== See also ==
- Carignan (disambiguation)
- Principe di Carignano (disambiguation)
