= Victor Amadeus I, Prince of Carignano =

Victor Amadeus I
- Prince of Carignano
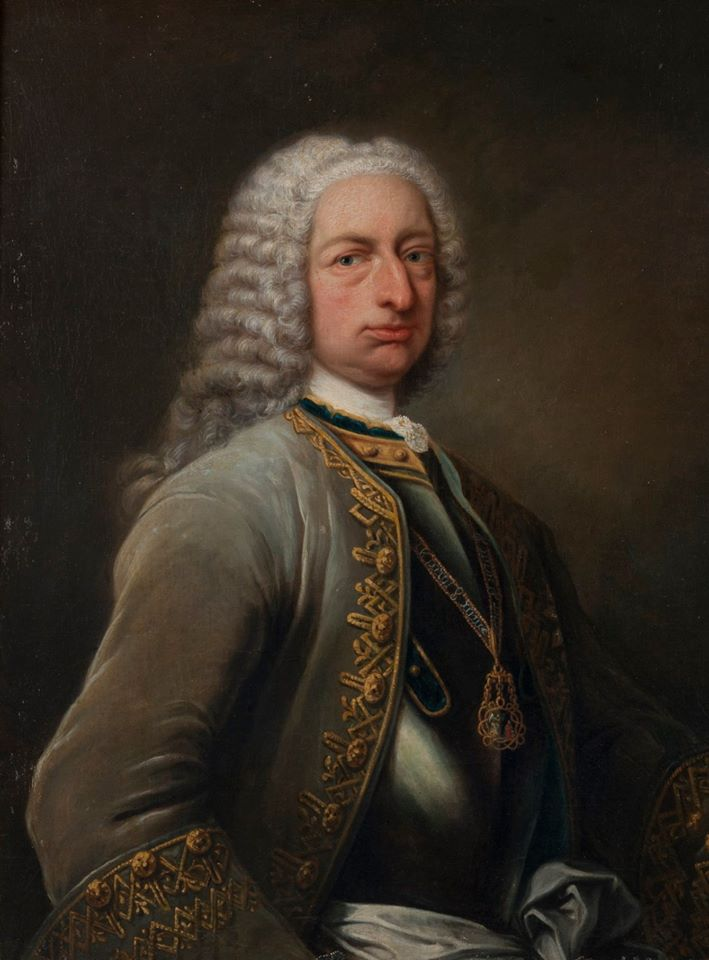

Prince of Carignano
- Reign: 21 April 1709 – 4 April 1741
- Predecessor: Emmanuel Philibert
- Successor: Louis Victor
- Born: 1 March 1690; Turin
- Died: 4 April 1741 (aged 51); Turin
- Spouse: Maria Vittoria of Savoy (m. 1714)
- Issue Detail: Anne Thérèse, Princess of Soubise; Louis Victor, Prince of Carignano
- House: Savoy-Carignano
- Father: Emmanuel Philibert, Prince of Carignano
- Mother: Maria Angela Caterina d'Este

Victor Amadeus of Savoy, 3rd Prince of Carignano (1 March 1690 – 4 April 1741) was an Italian nobleman who was Prince of Carignano from 1709 to 1741. He was the son of Emmanuel Philibert of Savoy, Prince of Carignano, and Maria Angela Caterina d'Este.

== Biography ==
Born in Turin, he was the third child of four and the eldest son.

Made a Knight of the Annunciation in 1696, he married, at Moncalieri on 7 November 1714, Marie Victoire Françoise of Savoy (1690–1766), legitimised daughter of the Duke of Savoy, Victor Amadeus II, at the time King of Sicily (and later of Sardinia), and of Jeanne Baptiste d'Albert de Luynes, Countess of Verrue.

His father-in-law showed affection for him but ended up depriving him, in 1717, of his 400,000 livres of annual income because of excessive spending. It was then that he ran away to France, at the end of 1718, in order to take possession of his inheritance.

Since he had lost the Château de Condé to Jean-François Leriget de La Faye when it was confiscated from his family by Louis XV on 6 March 1719, he established himself in the hôtel de Soissons, which he transformed, with his wife who had followed him there, into a "sumptuous gaming house" which for a time sheltered the economist John Law. He died, ruined, and his hôtel was razed to construct in its place a grain-trading hall, now the site of the Bourse de commerce de Paris.

Next to his mother-in-law, Jeanne Baptiste d'Albert de Luynes, Countess of Verrue, he counted in the 1730s among the most influential amateurs and art collectors in Paris. He gathered in an important painting collection which was sold after his death in 1742 partly to Louis XV, King of France, and to August III of Poland, King of Poland and Elector of Saxony.

He had a passion for the Paris Opéra, and was named intendant of the Menus-Plaisirs by Louis XV. He brought about the disgrace of the tax farmer Alexandre Le Riche de La Poupelinière after he caught him in the company of his mistress, the actress Marie Antier.

== Family ==
Victor Amadeus' children were:

- Joseph Victor Amédée (1 January 1716 – 18 January 1716) died in infancy.
- Anne Thérèse of Savoy (1717–1745), married in 1741 to Charles de Rohan, prince de Soubise (1715–1787)
- Louis-Victor of Savoy (1721–1778), Prince of Carignan, married to Landgravine Christine of Hesse-Rotenburg, had issue.
- Victor Amédée (16 June 1722 - 1722) died in infancy.
- A stillborn daughter, born in 1729

== Ancestry ==
Ancestors of Victor Amadeus I, Prince of Carignano

8. Charles Emmanuel I, Duke of Savoy
4. Thomas Francis, Prince of Carignano
9. Catherine Michaela of Austria
2. Emmanuel Philibert, Prince of Carignano
10. Charles, Count of Soissons
5. Marie, Countess of Soissons
11. Anne de Montafié
1. Victor Amadeus, Prince of Carignan
12. Cesare d'Este, Duke of Modena
6. Borso d'Este
13. Virginia de' Medici
3. Maria Caterina d'Este
14. Luigi d'Este
7. Ippolita d'Este
