= Carignan (disambiguation) =

Carignan is a Spanish variety of grape.

Carignan may also refer to:

- Carignan, Quebec, a town in Quebec, Canada
- Carignan, Ardennes, a commune in France
- House of Savoy-Carignan
- Carignan-Salières Regiment, a French military unit formed by merging the Carignan Regiment and the Salières Regiment in 1659
- the Piedmontese name for Carignano, a municipality in Italy
- Campo de Cariñena, a comarca in Aragon, Spain

== People with the surname ==
- Anatole Carignan (1885–1952), Canadian politician
- Andrew Carignan (born 1986), American baseball player
- Harvey Carignan (1927–2023), American serial killer
- Jean Carignan (1916–1988), Canadian fiddler
- Jean-Guy Carignan (born 1941), Canadian member of parliament
- Jennie Carignan, Canadian general
- Nicole Carignan (born 1952), Canadian composer and educator
- Onésime Carignan (1839–1897), Canadian grocer and politician
- Patrick Carignan (born 1972), Canadian hockey player
- Yves Carignan (born 1952), Canadian weightlifter

== See also ==
- Cariñena (DO), a Spanish wine region
- Carignano (disambiguation)
