= Principe di Carignano =

Principe di Carignano may refer to:

- Principe di Carignano, prince of House of Savoy-Carignano
- Principe di Carignano-class ironclad, group of three ironclad warships built for the Italian Regia Marina (Royal Navy) in the 1860s
- Italian ironclad Principe di Carignano, lead ship of the Principe di Carignano class of ironclad warships built for the Italian Regia Marina

== See also ==
- Carignano (disambiguation)
- Palazzo Carignano
- Princess of Carignano
