= Rivalta =

Rivalta (from Latin Ripa Alta) may refer to:

== Populated places ==
- Rivalta, Lesignano de' Bagni
- Rivalta, Pocenia
- Rivalta, Reggio Emilia
- Rivalta Bormida
- Rivalta sul Mincio
- Rivalta Scrivia
- Rivalta di Torino
- Rivalta Trebbia
- Rivalta Veronese

== People with the surname ==
- Augusto Rivalta (1835 or 1838 – 1925), Italian sculptor
- Claudio Rivalta (born 1978), Italian footballer

== Other ==
- Ducal Palace of Rivalta
- Rivalba
