= Princess of Carignano =

The Princess of Carignano was a woman married to the Prince of Carignano of the House of Savoy. The list ends with Charles Albert, in 1831, after he became King of Sardinia. But the Queens of Sardinia and later Italy used the title "Princess of Carignano" as part of their full title which included many other titles.

The fief of Carignano had belonged to the counts of Savoy since 1418; Carignano was erected by Charles Emmanuel I, Duke of Savoy into a principality as an appanage for his third son, Thomas Francis. The fact that it was part of Piedmont, only twenty km. south of Turin, meant that it could be a "princedom" for Thomas in name only, being endowed neither with independence nor revenues of substance. Instead of receiving a significant patrimony, Thomas was wed in 1625 to Marie de Bourbon, sister and co-heiress of Louis de Bourbon, comte de Soissons, who would be killed in 1641 while fomenting rebellion against Cardinal Richelieu.

== Princess of Carignano ==
=== de facto ===
Picture	Name	Father	Birth	Marriage	Became Princess	Ceased to be Princess	Death	Spouse
	Marie de Bourbon, Countess of Soissons	Charles, Count of Soissons (Bourbon)	3 March 1606	6 January 1625		22 January 1656 husband's death	3 June 1692	Thomas Francis
	Maria Angela Caterina d'Este	Borso d'Este (Este)	1 March 1656	7 November 1684		23 April 1709 husband's death	16 July 1722	Emmanuel Philibert
	Maria Vittoria of Savoy, Marchesa di Susa	Victor Amadeus II of Sardinia (Savoy)	10 February 1690	7 November 1714		4 April 1741 husband's death	8 July 1766	Victor Amadeus I
	Christine of Hesse-Rotenburg	Ernest Leopold, Landgrave of Hesse-Rotenburg (Hesse-Rotenburg)	21 November 1717	4 May 1740	4 April 1741 husband's accession	1 September 1778		Louis Victor
	Joséphine of Lorraine	Louis Charles de Lorraine, Prince of Lambesc (Lorraine)	26 August 1753	18 October 1768	16 December 1778 husband's accession	September 1780 husband's death	8 February 1797	Victor Amadeus II
	Maria Christina of Saxony	Charles of Saxony, Duke of Courland (Wettin)	7 December 1770	24 October 1797		16 August 1800 husband's death	24 November 1851	Charles Emmanuel
	Archduchess Maria Theresa of Austria	Ferdinand III, Grand Duke of Tuscany (Habsburg-Lorraine)	21 March 1801	30 September 1817		27 April 1831 becomes Queen	12 January 1855	Charles Albert

=== de jure ===
As noted, the Principality was bought by Louis Jean Marie de Bourbon; as such the title was born by his Modenese wife; at his death to passed to his daughter by inheritance. The title was confiscated off Marie Adélaïde during the French Revolution.

Picture	Name	Father	Birth	Marriage	Became Princess	Ceased to be Princess	Death	Spouse
	Maria Teresa Felicitas d'Este	Francesco III d'Este, Duke of Modena (Este)	6 October 1726	29 December 1744	1751	30 April 1754		Louis Jean Marie de Bourbon, Duke of Penthièvre
	Louise Marie Adélaïde de Bourbon; Mademoiselle de Penthièvre	Louis Jean Marie de Bourbon, Duke of Penthièvre (Bourbon)	13 March 1753	8 May 1768	4 March 1793 father's death	1793 confiscated by French Republic	23 June 1821	Philippe d'Orléans, Philippe Égalité

== See also ==
- List of Savoyard consorts
- List of Sardinian consorts
- List of Italian consorts
