= Ippolita d'Este =

Italian noblewoman (1620–1656)

- Born: 1620; Modena, Italy
- Died: 1656 (age 35-36); Ducal Palace of Rivalta, Emilia-Romagna
- Spouse: Borso d'Este (m. 1647; died 1656)
- Issue: Luigi II, Lord of Scandiano; Foresto, Lord of Montecchio; Cesare Ignazio, Lord of Montecchio; Giulia Teresa d'Este; Maria Angela Caterina, Princess of Carignano
- House: Este
- Father: Luigi I d'Este

Ippolita d'Este (1620 – 1656) was an Italian noblewoman, a member of the ducal House of Este. She was the illegitimate daughter of Luigi I d'Este, Lord of Montecchio and Scandiano.

== Biography ==
Born in Modena, Ippolita was the illegitimate daughter of Prince Luigi I d'Este, Lord of Montecchio and Scandiano, a son of Cesare d'Este, Duke of Modena, and Virginia de' Medici. She was born around 1620, but the identity of her mother is not known.

She fell in love with her uncle Borso d'Este, younger brother of her father. The marriage negotiations caused a big scandal in the Este court, not only because the couple were uncle and niece, but also because Ippolita was an illegitimate daughter and she was not of enough rank to marry a member of the House of Este. However, Borso was determined to marry her and her father facilitated this by legitimizing his daughter. On April 24, 1647, Ippolita was legitimized by her cousin Francesco I, Duke of Modena. A papal dispensation from Pope Innocent X was necessary due to the kinship of the future spouses. Borso and Ippolita were then married in a ceremony in Scandiano.

The marriage was a happy one, and the couple spent most of their time in the Ducal Palace of Rivalta. Ippolita died in 1656, shortly after the birth of their last child, Maria Angela Caterina, aged 35 or 36. Borso himself would die a year later. Their five surviving children were put under the care of her father Luigi.

== Issue ==
Ippolita and her husband had seven children, of which two died in childhood. They were also the founders of a minor line of the House of Este, the short lived House of Este-Scandiano. Since none of their sons married or had issue, the line died out.

- Luigi (1648–1698), Lord of Scandiano. Died unmarried and without issue.
- Foresto Francesco (1652–1725), Lord of Montecchio. Died unmarried and without issue.
- Cesare Ignazio (1653–1713), succeeded his brother Foresto as Lord of Montecchio. Died unmarried and without issue.
- Giulia Teresa (1654-?), died unmarried and without issue.
- Maria Angela Caterina (1656–1722), married Victor Amadeus I, Prince of Carignano and had issue.
