= Racconigi Castle =

Palace and landscape park in Italy

- Castello Reale di Racconigi
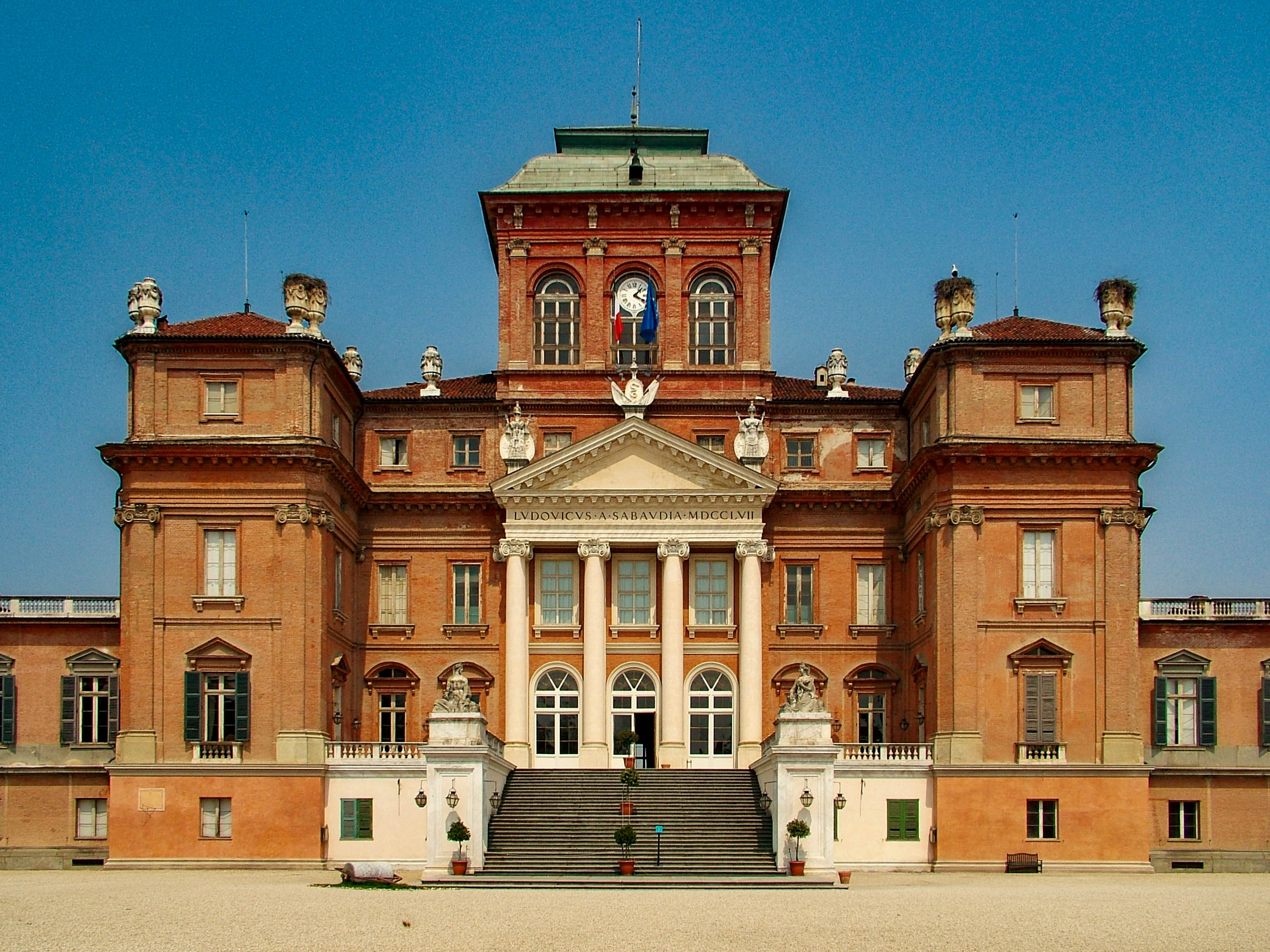
- Southern façade of the castle

- Location within Piedmont Location within Italy

General information
- Coordinates: 44°46′09.8″N 7°40′33.5″E

UNESCO World Heritage Site
- Criteria: (i)(ii)(iv)(v)
- Reference: 823bis
- Inscription: 1997 (21st Session)

Racconigi Castle (Italian: Castello Reale di Racconigi) is a palace and landscape park in Racconigi, province of Cuneo, Italy. It was the official residence of the Carignano line of the House of Savoy, and is one of the Residences of the Royal House of Savoy included by UNESCO in the World Heritage Sites list.

== History ==
The first records of the castle are from around the year 1000, when Bernardino of Susa rebuilt an ancient manor, leaving it to Cistercian monks.

The castle was a possession of the margraves of Saluzzo and others starting in the 13th century, and in the 16th century was acquired by the House of Savoy. In 1630, Charles Emmanuel I, Duke of Savoy granted it to his nephew Thomas Francis, Prince of Carignano, founder of the Savoy-Carignano line. At this time, the castle was a high brick moated fortress with a square plan, four corner towers and a tall donjon (mastio) on one side.

=== Architecture ===
Emmanuel Philibert, Prince of Carignano, Tommaso's son, in the late 17th century, commissioned Guarino Guarini to transform the fortress into a pleasure residence. The architect erected the current central section where the court was, adding a pagoda-like roof. The two northern towers were replaced by pavilions with dome roofs and square plans, provided with white marble lanterns. The gardens were also created.

In the late 18th century, Louis Victor, Prince of Carignano ordered a renovation of the interiors, enlarging the two southern towers, adding stucco and other neoclassical decoration; he also commissioned a new entrance, with 4 Corinthian columns and a triangular fronton, and the great staircase.

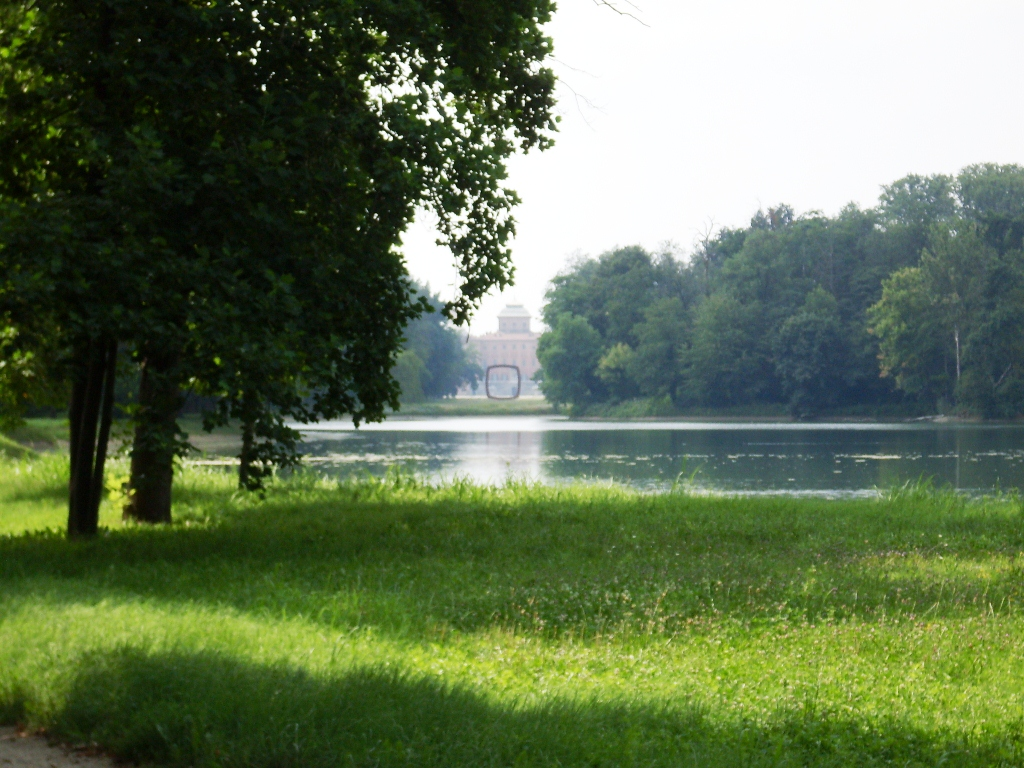
Park with the big lake

Charles Albert, a Carignano who eventually became King of Sardinia, further enlarged and embellished the castle to represent the splendour of the newly acquired reign. His court architect Ernesto Melano expanded the ancient square structure around the central section and added two side buildings connected to the façade pavilions, as well as another staircase on the southern side.

Here the last King of Italy, Umberto II, was born in 1904. Having received the castle as a wedding present in 1930, he proceeded to install in it the family gallery of some 3,000 paintings and historical documents regarding the Shroud of Turin.

=== Landscape park ===
Emmanuel Philibert created a wide park in the jardin à la française style that opens for the castle's northwards view. It was designed by the renowned 17th-century French landscape architect André Le Nôtre, known for designing the gardens of Versailles.

In the late 18th century the English landscape garden style was introduced, Pelagio Palagi erected a series of small structures along the lake; such as the Doric Tempietto, the Gothic style chapel, and other landscape elements. A Russian dacha, built to honour Tsar Nicholas II of Russia's visit to Piedmont to sign the Racconigi Bargain, was also created in the landscape park.

The one hundred and seventy hectares of parkland were given its current design by the German Xavier Kurten, who gave the setting a romantic touch: lakes, canals, bridges, caves, picturesque buildings and old trees populated by several species of birds, including a large colony of storks.

At the far end of the park are the "Margherie" buildings, so called because they were originally used for the production of milk and cheese and as a dwelling for the shepherds. In the nineteenth century, in fact, as the new concept of country residence required, Racconigi intended to be a model farm and not just a royal castle and park. Therefore, a compromise was reached to create a functional and aesthetically appealing building.

== See also ==
- Italian Renaissance garden
- Giardino all'italiana
- List of gardens in Italy
- Grandi Giardini Italiani
