= Thomas Francis, Prince of Carignano =

Thomas Francis
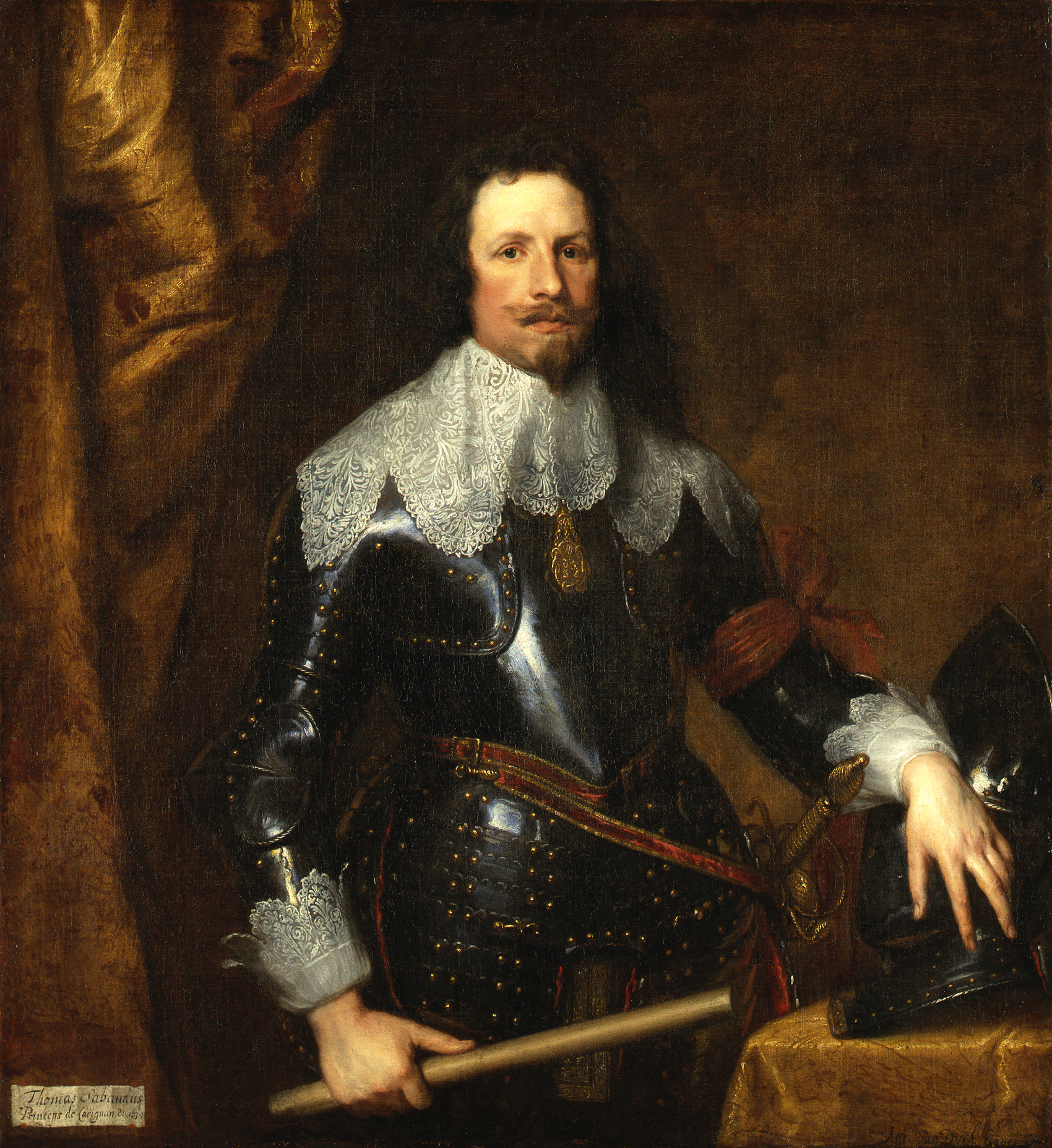
- Portrait by Anthony van Dyck, 1634

Prince of Carignano
- Tenure: 29 April 1620 – 22 January 1656
- Successor: Emmanuel Philibert
- Born: 21 December 1596; Turin, Duchy of Savoy
- Died: 22 January 1656 (aged 59); Turin, Duchy of Savoy
- Spouse: Marie de Bourbon (m. 1625)
- Issue: Princess Christine Charlotte; Princess Louise; Emmanuel Philibert, Prince of Carignano; Prince Amedeo; Prince Joseph Emmanuel; Eugene Maurice, Count of Soissons; Prince Ferdinand
Names
- Tommaso Francesco di Savoia
- House: Savoy (Carignano branch)
- Father: Charles Emmanuel I
- Mother: Caterina Micaela of Asturias

Thomas Francis of Savoy, Prince of Carignano (Italian: Tommaso Francesco di Savoia, Principe di Carignano; French: Thomas François de Savoie, Prince de Carignan; 21 December 1596 – 22 January 1656) was a military commander and member of the House of Savoy. He was the founder of the Carignano branch of the House of Savoy, which reigned as kings of Piedmont–Sardinia from 1831 to 1861, and as kings of Italy from 1861 until the dynasty's deposition in 1946.

== Background ==
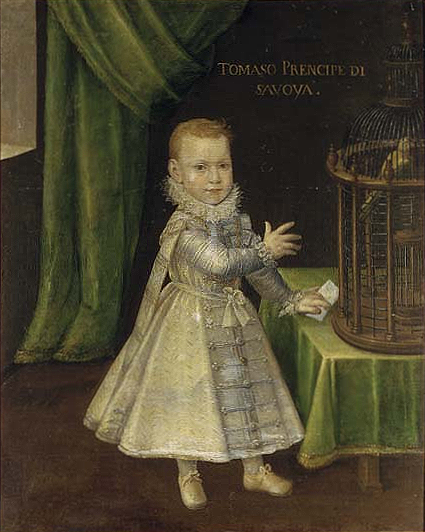
Portrait by a follower of Jan Kraeck, c. 1600

Born in Turin, Thomas was the youngest of the five legitimate sons of the sovereign Duke Charles Emmanuel I of Savoy by his consort Caterina Micaela of Austria, a daughter of King Philip II of Spain and the French princess Elisabeth of France. His mother died the following year. While still a young man, Thomas bore arms in the service of the king of Spain in Italy.

Although in previous reigns, younger sons had been granted rich appanages in Switzerland (Genevois, Vaud), Italy (Aosta), or France (Nemours, Bresse), the Savoy dukes found that this inhibited their own aggrandizement while encouraging intra-dynastic strife and regional secession. Not only did Thomas have older brothers, but he was one of the twenty-one acknowledged children of Charles Emmanuel. While only nine of these were legitimate, the others, being the widowed duke's offspring by noble mistresses, appear to have been generously endowed or dowered during their father's lifetime.

The fief of Carignano had belonged to the Savoys since 1418, and the fact that it was part of Piedmont, only twenty km. south of Turin, meant that it could be a "princedom" for Thomas in name only, being endowed neither with independence nor revenues of substance. Instead of receiving a significant patrimony, Thomas was wed in 1625 to Marie de Bourbon; she was sister to and co-heiress with Louis, Count of Soissons, who would be killed in 1641 while fomenting rebellion against Cardinal Richelieu.

== France ==
In anticipation of this inheritance, Thomas and Marie did not establish themselves at his brother's capital, Turin, but dwelt in Paris, where Marie enjoyed the exalted rank of a princess du sang, being a second cousin of King Louis XIII. It was arranged that Thomas, as son of a reigning monarch, would hold the rank of first among the princes étrangers at the French court—taking precedence even before the formerly all-powerful House of Guise, whose kinship to the sovereign Duke of Lorraine was more remote. He was appointed Grand Maître of the king's household, briefly replacing the traitorous Grand Condé. He engaged the services of the distinguished grammarian and courtier Claude Favre de Vaugelas as tutor for his children.

The prospect of Marie's eventual succession to the Swiss principality of Neuchâtel, near Savoy, was foiled in 1643 by the king's decision to legitimate Louis Henri de Bourbon, chevalier de Soissons (1640–1703), a son of Marie's late brother. This prevented the substitution of Savoyard for French influence in that region, but left Thomas with little more than the empty title of "prince de Carignano". Marie did eventually inherit her brother's main holding in France, the county of Soissons, but this would be established as a secundogeniture for the French branch of the family. After Thomas, the senior branch of his descendants repatriated to Savoy, alternately marrying French, Italian and German princesses.

== Public career ==
=== Early actions and service with Spain ===
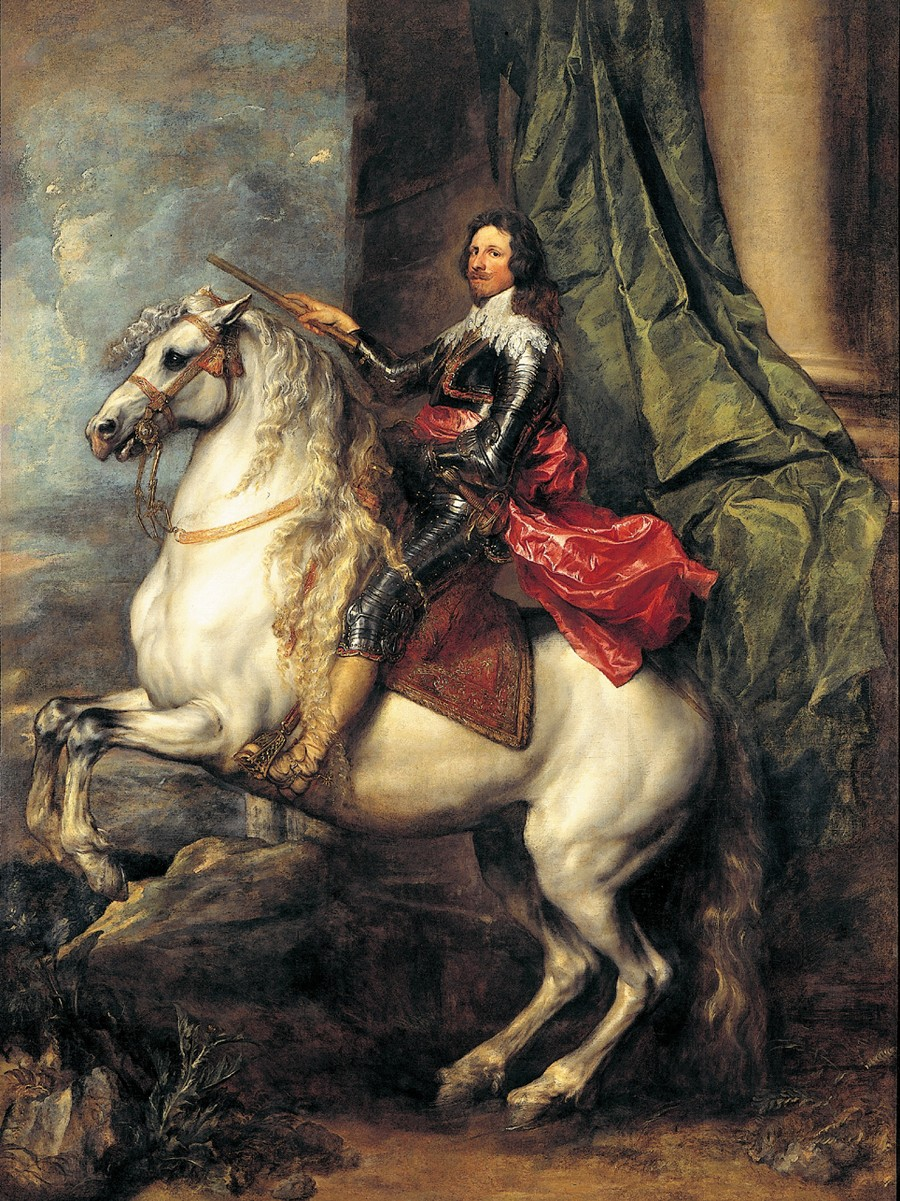
Equestrian portrait by Anthony van Dyck, c. 1634–1635

Thomas' first recorded service is as a commander in the Piedmontese army under his father in the war against France in 1630 (see War of the Mantuan Succession). It was probably around this time that he first encountered Mazarin, who (though his public position was quite complex) was during 1630–32 in effect a French agent at the Piedmontese court. When the new Duke Victor Amadeus I was forced to accept a French occupation of Pinerolo (Peace of Cherasco, 26 April 1631, and associated secret agreements, implemented 1632), there was widespread dissatisfaction in Piedmont, and Thomas, with his brother Maurice, went to join the Spanish, at which Victor Amadeus confiscated their revenues. (The exact date of the move is unstated, but was probably 1632, certainly no later than 1634.) Though welcomed by the Spanish given that he was related to both the French and Spanish royal families, Thomas was not entirely trusted by them, and had to send his wife and children to Madrid as hostages.

Spain, during the burst of confidence after its unexpected great victory at Nordlingen in 1634, made plans for major operations in Germany to end the war against the Protestants there and in the Netherlands; these plans included Thomas leading an army in Westphalia, under the overall command of the Cardinal-Infante Ferdinand, brother of Philip IV. Nothing came of this, but in 1635, when France declared war on Spain (Franco-Spanish war of 1635–59), Thomas served under Ferdinand in the Spanish Netherlands: he was given command of a small army (variously given as 8,500 or 13,000) sent against French forces that had advanced into Luxemburg, his orders either to observe them or to prevent them from joining up with a Dutch army. On 22 May 1635 at Les Avins, south of Huy, in what was then the bishopric of Liège, he was defeated by the French army commanded by Breezé and Chatillon. He managed to rally the remnants at Namur, then retreated before the numerically superior French and Dutch forces; and he probably served the rest of the campaign with Ferdinand. Late in the year, the refugee Charles IV, Duke of Lorraine arrived in Brussels and met Thomas; they may have formed a joint court, and Thomas certainly participated in jousts organised by the Duke. (In this Franco-Spanish war, Piedmont was reluctantly dragged into the fighting alongside the French, though initially it avoided a full declaration of war; consequently, Thomas was technically fighting against his own homeland.)

In 1636, the Cardinal-Infante Ferdinand organised a joint Spanish-Imperial army for a major invasion of France from the Spanish Netherlands, and Thomas was initially in charge, defeating the French army commanded by Soisons at the Somme, though Ferdinand soon took over supreme command. The invasion was initially very successful, and seemed capable of reaching Paris, where there was a great panic; if Ferdinand and Thomas had pushed on, they might have ended the war at this point, but they both felt that continuing to Paris was too risky, so they stopped the advance. Later in the campaign, Thomas had problems with the Imperial general Ottavio Piccolomini, who refused to accept orders from the Prince as a Spanish commander, arguing that his Imperial troops were an independent force. Military action for Thomas is not recorded in 1637, but in this year, when his brother-in-law Soissons fled from France after his failed conspiracy against Cardinal Richelieu, he acted as intermediary between Soissons and the Spanish in negotiations which led to a formal alliance between the count and Philip IV of Spain concluded 28 June 1637 - although within a month Soissons had reconciled with France! In 1638, Thomas served in Spanish Flanders, helping to defend the fortress-city of Saint-Omer against a French siege; in mid-June, he managed to get reinforcements into the place, then with the rest of his small army entrenched about 15 km. to the north-west at Ruminghem, opposite the French army under Jacques-Nompar de Caumont, duke of La Force at Zouafques; after being joined by Imperial reinforcements under Ottavio Piccolomini, he marched to attack La Force, and was defeated with the loss of 2,000 men killed or captured (action at Zouafques, exact date unknown but around 21 June). However, he then marched back with his remaining troops to the continuing French siege of Saint-Omer, where he put in more reinforcements and then entrenched himself so securely in the vicinity that the French found it impossible to continue the siege and gave up. Thomas and Piccolimini subsequently stuck so close to La Force that the French were unable to undertake any serious operations.

=== Piedmontese Civil War ===
After seeking Spanish support late in 1638 for action against Regent Christine Marie, Madame Royale, Thomas went to Spanish Milan early in 1639, and alongside Spanish forces invaded Piedmont, where many towns welcomed him. He took Turin by trickery, but the French continued to control its citadel. In 1640, he held the city in the multi-layered siege of Turin. After repeated bouts of negotiations with the Regent and the French, Thomas made peace with both in the first half of 1642, and unblushingly changed sides and started fighting with the French against the Spaniards.

=== Service with France ===
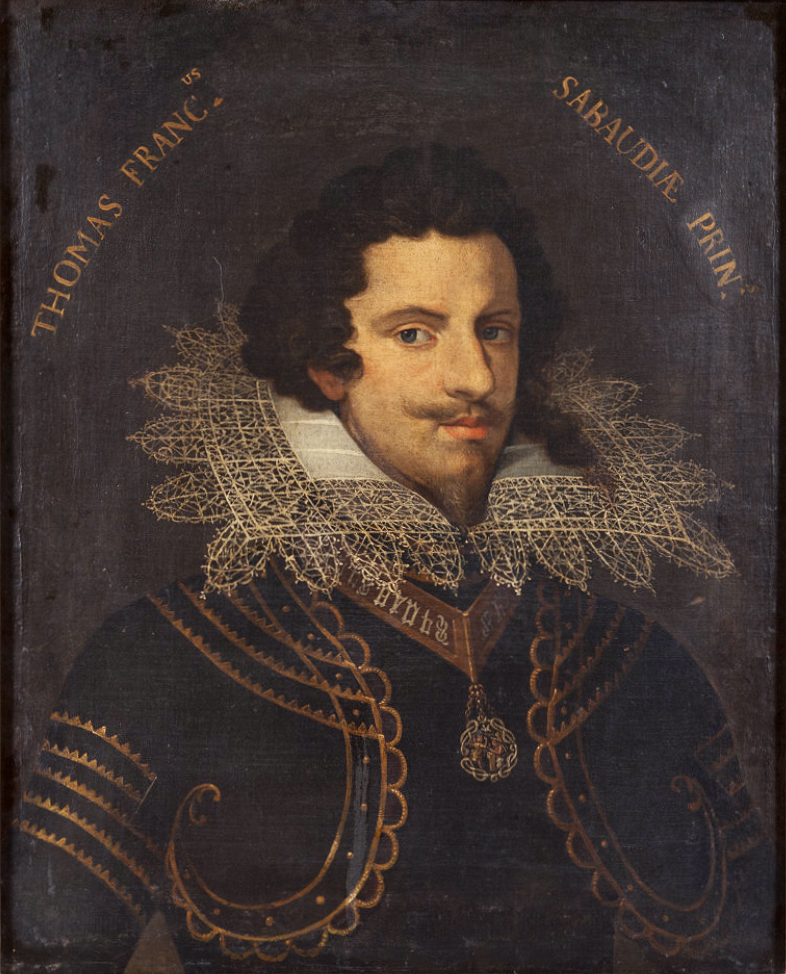
Anonymous portrait at the Royal Castle of Racconigi

For the rest of 1642 and part of the 1643 campaigns, Thomas commanded Piedmontese forces fighting alongside the French under Henri d'Orléans, Duke of Longueville against the Spanish, generally along the Piedmont/Milan border; when Longueville was recalled home, Thomas succeeded him as allied commander-in-chief, with Turenne as his second-in-command. (Thomas was given the supreme command only because of his birth; another French general, Du Plessis Praslin, noted a few years later that French marshals would only serve under someone who was superior to them in social rank, and Thomas, with his blood relationship to the French and Spanish royal families, was the only candidate.) By late summer, both Thomas and Turenne were seriously ill and Du Plessis Praslin was in temporary command. Thomas led the joint armies again in 1644, taking Santya and Asti; he also tried to take Finale Ligure, but gave up the attempt, apparently because he feared this valuable port would end up in French control rather than Piedmontese. In 1645, now commanding with Du Plessis Praslin, he took Vigevano, but was defeated at the River Mora. In 1646, Thomas was put in command of the French expedition sent south to take the Tuscan forts, after which he was to advance further south to Naples, drive out the Spanish and put himself on the throne of the kingdom; but the expedition set off late, and when he besieged Orbetello, the supporting French fleet was defeated by the Spanish and he was forced to raise the siege and conduct a difficult retreat, which he performed so poorly that Cardinal Mazarin subsequently despised his command ability, viewed him as incompetent, and declined to appoint him to the expedition that France sent to support the Naples revolt late in 1647 (this did not stop Mazarin from considering him as a potential candidate for a French-backed King of Naples, though Paris was so slow to move on this that Henry II, Duke of Guise was adopted by the Neapolitans instead). In the 1647 campaign, Thomas is mentioned as commanding alongside the French general in the forces sent across north Italy to work with the Duke of Modena Francesco I d'Este who had just allied with France and opened up a 'second front' against the Spaniards in Milan, though Mazarin confessed that he had appointed Thomas only because he feared that, if left behind in Piedmont, the Prince's restless spirit would make more trouble. By spring of 1648 however he was back in Piedmont, fighting on the Piedmont-Milan border to distract the Spanish from their pressure on Modena; in the summer, he was put in charge of an army sent on a fleet to Naples - the Naples revolt had already collapsed by then, so the expedition found no support when it landed and after some pointless actions it re-embarked, a complete failure (some details in Naples revolt). On his return with the French fleet, Thomas was delayed in Provence and unable to join the great siege of Cremona where he was expected.

During his absence, Regent Christine had gained control of the fortresses granted to Thomas as part of the settlement of the Piedmontese Civil War (legally, these reverted to ducal control when the Duke came of age), which under Piedmontese law Charles Emmanuel did in 1648, though his mother remained in control of the government; Christine, accompanied by her son and part of the ducal army, entered Ivrea and dismissed Thomas' personal garrison; she appointed Thomas instead as governor or Asti and Alba, positions which sweetened the blow but were entirely under ducal control, not guaranteed by treaty. When he returned to Piedmont, Thomas had no choice but to accept the fait accompli, and soon after this he went to live in Paris.

During the Fronde, Thomas linked himself closely with Cardinal Mazarin, who, although effectively prime minister of France, was like him an Italian outsider at the French court. In the early 1650s, Thomas was seen as an important member of Mazarin's party, closely linked to the Cardinal, regularly seen in conference with him, and active in his support. In 1651 when Mazarin had been forced into exile, the Prince was for a time brought onto the conseil du roi, and an (admittedly very hostile) contemporary the duchesse de Nemours described him as a 'prime minister without being aware of it'; there were suggestions that Mazarin's opponents within the court had raised him up as a rival to the cardinal with the Queen, but this is unlikely, especially since Mazarin himself urged the Queen to follow Thomas' advice, and it is more probable that Mazarin backed the Prince as someone who would keep other rivals from gaining control in his absence but who would never have the status within France to set himself up as a permanent replacement for the Cardinal. By the time Mazarin returned from his second and last exile in February 1653, Thomas, who accompanied the court to St Denis to welcome the Cardinal home, was insignificant again - an analysis of Mazarin's close colleagues at this time by the later historian Chéruel made no mention of him. In January 1654, when the last of the ceremonial offices formerly belonging to the rebel leader Louis II de Bourbon, Prince de Condé were disposed of, Prince Thomas was made Grand Maitre.

The Franco-Spanish war had been continuing in north Italy, and late in 1654, increasing Piedmontese hostility to the current French commander Grancey led to a search for a new allied commander-in-chief; the French would have preferred to send the Duke of York (later King James II), but he too was unacceptable to Turin, so Thomas was appointed as joint commander - though his wife was held in France almost as a hostage for his good behaviour. On 16 December 1654 he arrived in Turin, to a ceremonial welcome by the French troops and an unexpectedly friendly reception by Charles Emmanuel. On 4 April 1655 Thomas Francis commanded the Waldensians to attend Mass or remove to the upper valleys, giving them twenty days in which to sell their lands. The Duke of Savoy sent an army, and on 24 April, at 4 a.m., the signal was given for a general massacre so brutal that it aroused indignation throughout Europe. Oliver Cromwell began petitioning on behalf of the Vaudois, and John Milton wrote his famous poem about this, "On the Late Massacre in Piedmont." In the 1655 campaign, he led an invasion of the Duchy of Milan, though already ill with malaria, and besieged Pavia, where the attack went so badly that he was forced to leave his sick-bed to take direct control of the siege, and even then it had to be raised after nearly two months of fruitless effort.

== Death ==
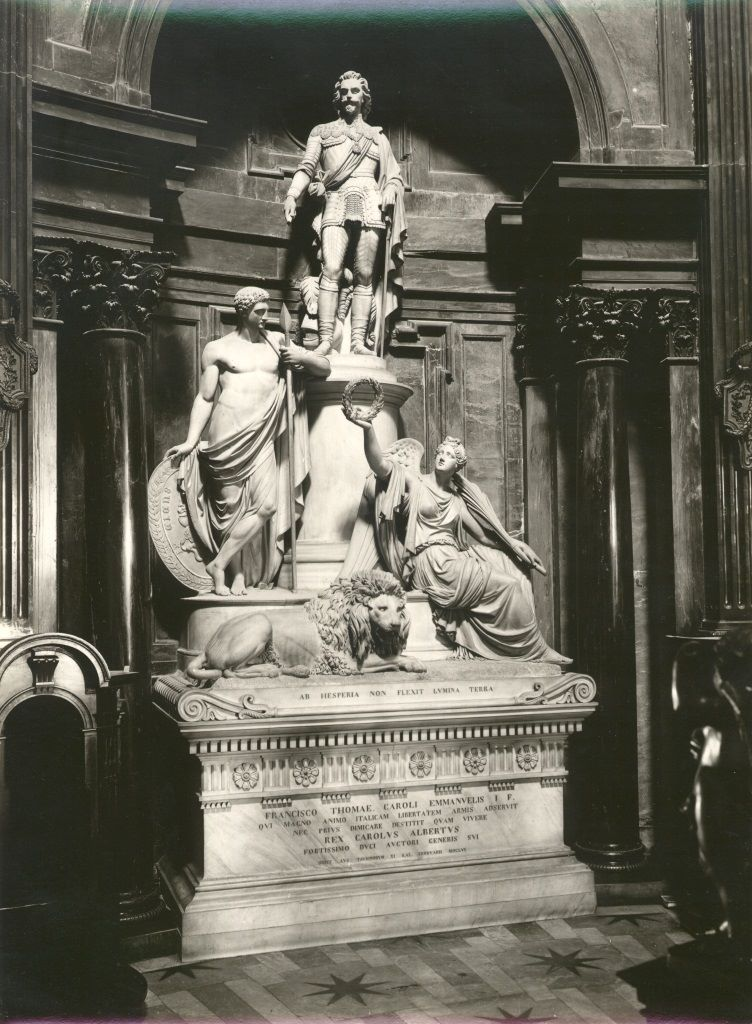
Tomb monument of Thomas Francis at the Chapel of the Holy Shroud, Turin

After the 1655 campaign, Thomas returned to Turin where he died the following January; the suggestion in Spanheim that he died at the siege of Pavia is not supported - malaria, a common problem in the marshes of the Po valley, carried him off, as it carried off his successor as allied commander-in-chief, Francesco I d'Este.

== Family ==
Thomas and Marie de Bourbon had seven children (Italian names in parentheses):

1. Princess Christine Charlotte of Savoy (27 April 1626 – 22 October 1626) died in infancy.
2. Princess Louise Christine of Savoy (1627–1689), married in 1654 to Ferdinand Maximilian of Baden-Baden (1625–1669)
3. Prince Emmanuel Philibert Amadeus of Savoy (Emanuele Filiberto Amedeo) (1628–1709), 2nd Prince of Carignano; he lived in Italy, becoming governor of Ivrea in 1644 and of Asti in 1663. At Racconigi in 1684, he married Princess Maria Angela Caterina d'Este (1656–1722), granddaughter of Cesare I d'Este, Duke of Modena. Since he was deaf-mute, the marriage shocked his mother, infuriated his sister-in-law Olympia Mancini, injured the inheritance prospects of his French nephews and nieces, and so offended Louis XIV that Francis II, Duke of Modena felt obliged to banish from his realm the bride's kinsman, who had acted as the couple's intermediary.
4. Prince Amedeo of Savoy (12 May 1629 – 2 October 1629) died in infancy.
5. Prince Joseph Emmanuel of Savoy (24 June 1631 – 5 January 1656), Count of Soissons, died aged 24. Never married or had children.
6. Prince Eugene Maurice of Savoy (1635–1673), Count of Soissons and Count of Dreux, married Olympia Mancini
7. Prince Ferdinand of Savoy (15 November 1637 – 29 November 1637), died young.

== Ancestry ==
Ancestors of Thomas Francis, Prince of Carignano

8. Charles III, Duke of Savoy
4. Emmanuel Philibert, Duke of Savoy
9. Beatrice of Portugal
2. Charles Emmanuel I, Duke of Savoy
10. Francis I of France
5. Margaret, Duchess of Berry
11. Claude, Duchess of Brittany
1. Thomas Francis, Prince of Carignano
12. Charles V, Holy Roman Emperor
6. Philip II of Spain
13. Isabella of Portugal
3. Catherine Michaela of Austria
14. Henry II of France
7. Elisabeth of Valois
15. Catherine de' Medici

== Sources ==
- Parrott, David (1997). "The Mantuan Succession, 1627–31: A Sovereignty Dispute in Early Modern Europe". The English Historical Review. CXII, Issue 445, February (445). Oxford Academic: 20–65. doi:10.1093/ehr/CXII.445.20.
