= Alfonso III d'Este =

Duke of Modena and Reggio from 1628 to 1629

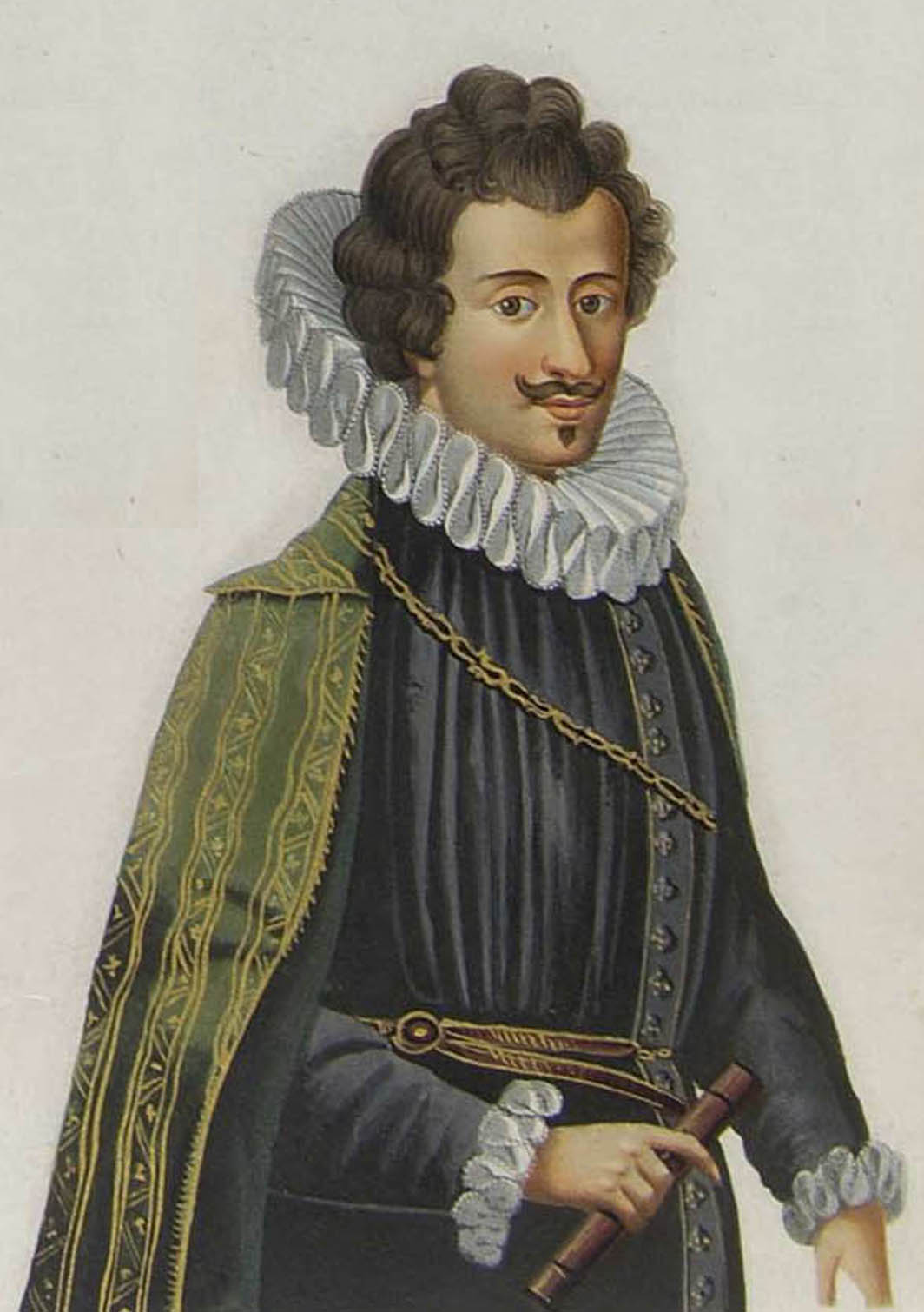

Duke of Modena and Reggio
- Reign: 11 December 1628 – 24 July 1629
- Predecessor: Cesare d'Este
- Successor: Francesco I d'Este
- Born: 22 October 1591; Ferrara, Duchy of Ferrara
- Died: 24 May 1644 (aged 52); Castelnuovo di Garfagnana
- Spouse: Isabella of Savoy (m. 1608; died 1626)
- Issue: Margherita, Duchess of Guastalla; Francesco, Duke of Modena; Anna Beatrice, Duchess of Mirandola; Cardinal Obizzo; Cardinal Rinaldo
- House: Este
- Father: Cesare d'Este, Duke of Modena
- Mother: Virginia de' Medici
- Religion: Roman Catholicism

Alfonso III d'Este (22 October 1591 – 24 May 1644) was Duke of Modena and Reggio from 1628 to 1629. He was the husband of Princess Isabella of Savoy, daughter of Charles Emmanuel I, Duke of Savoy and his wife Infanta Catherine Michelle of Spain.

== Biography ==
Born in Ferrara, he was the first son of Cesare d'Este, Duke of Modena and Virginia de' Medici. In 1613 he took part in the war against Lucca and had a primary role in the assassination of count Ercole Pepoli, who was disputing the duchy with Cesare, at Ferrara (1617).

In 1608 he was married to Isabella of Savoy, daughter of Charles Emmanuel I of Savoy. Profoundly in love with her, when she died in 1626 he considered taking religious vows. When his father died in 1628, Alfonso became Duke of Modena and Reggio. However, in July 1629 he announced his abdication from the Castle of Sassuolo. On September 8 of the same year he entered the Capuchin friars at Merano under the name of fra' Giambattista da Modena.

He was distinguished as a preacher and helper of dying people during the pestilence which struck the Duchy in 1630–1631. In the following year he returned to Modena, but his discourses against the costumes of the court made him unwelcome, so he retired to a convent in Castelnuovo di Garfagnana, built by his son, Duke Francesco I, where he died in 1644.

== Issue ==
Alfonso and Isabella had:

- Cesare d'Este (1609–1613), died in infancy;
- Francesco Ι d'Este (1610–1658), future Duke of Modena; married Maria Farnese, Vittoria Farnese and Lucrezia Barberini, all had issue;
- Obizzo d'Este (1611–1644), Bishop of Modena
- Caterina d'Este (1613–1628), nun
- Cesare d'Este (1614–1677), died unmarried
- Alessandro d'Este (1615), died in infancy
- Carlo Alessandro d'Este (1616–1679), died unmarried
- Rinaldo d'Este (1618–1672) Cardinal
- Margherita d'Este (1619–1692), married Ferrante III Gonzaga, Duke of Guastalla;
- Beatrice d'Este (1620), died in infancy;
- Beatrice d'Este (1622–1623), died in infancy;
- Filiberto d'Este (1623–1645);
- Bonifazio d'Este (1624), died in infancy;
- Anna Beatrice d'Este (1626–1690), married Alessandro II Pico della Mirandola

== Sources ==
- Condren, John (2024). Louis XIV and the Peace of Europe: French Diplomacy in Northern Italy, 1659–1701. Taylor & Francis.
- Mazur, Peter A. (2016). Conversion to Catholicism in Early Modern Italy. Routledge. ISBN 9781317265689.
- Quazza, Romolo (1960). "ALFONSO III d'Este, duca di Modena". Dizionario Biografico degli Italiani (in Italian). Vol. 2. Treccani.

Alfonso III d'Este House of Este Born: 22 October 1591 Died: 26 May 1644
Regnal titles
| Preceded by Cesare | Duke of Modena and Reggio; 1628–1629 | Succeeded by Francesco I |
