= Nicole Carignan =

Canadian composer and music educator

Nicole Carignan (born 1952) is a Canadian composer and music educator living in Quebec. She is a professor at the Université du Québec à Montréal.

== Early life and education ==
Carignan was born in Plessisville and earned a bachelor's degree in Music Education from the Université du Québec à Montréal (UQAM), a B.Mus. and a M.Mus. in composition and a PhD in comparative and intercultural education from the Université de Montréal.

== Career ==
Carignan has written articles about music education, and has led seminars and workshops on composition in South Africa, Europe, Russia and the United States. She is a researcher at the Faculty of Education of the Université de Montréal, the Department of Education of UQAM and at Cleveland State University.

Carignan taught music for the Commission scolaire de Laval and also taught composition at the Akademi Musik Indonesia in Yogyakarta, Java. She was a professor at Cleveland State University and is currently a professor in Intercultural Education at UQAM. She has also taught at the University of Port Elizabeth in South Africa.

Carignan worked on a project called Music Box of Productions Pandore Inc., a CD-ROM series which explores the world's musical culture. In 1997, the project received the Award of Excellence from the Alliance for Children and Television.

Carignan created a number of musical works, including pieces for solo instruments and orchestral works. Over fifty of her compositions have premiered in locations around the world.

She has earned honourable mentions from the Canadian Race Relations Foundation for two of her projects: Intercultural encounters between immigrants learning French and pre-service teachers at UQAM and the development of a teacher's guide for the DVD A lesson in discrimination

== Selected compositions ==
- "Quiebra" (1994)
- "Time, Space and Context: The Last 23 Days"
