= Emmanuel Philibert, Prince of Carignano =

Emmanuel Philibert
- Prince of Carignano
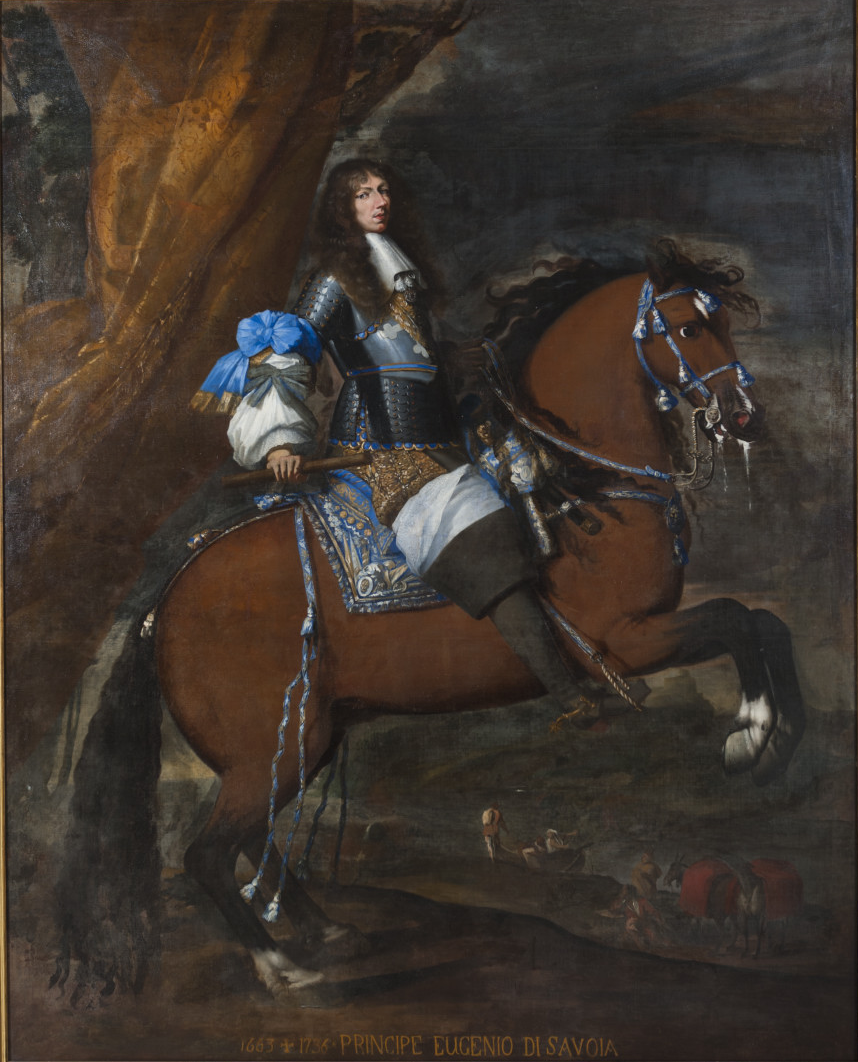
- Charles Dauphin, Equestrian portrait of Emmanuel Philibert of Carignano, oil on canvas, Palace of Venaria

Prince of Carignano
- Reign: 22 January 1656 – 21 April 1709
- Predecessor: Thomas Francis
- Successor: Victor Amadeus I
- Born: 20 August 1628; Moûtiers, France
- Died: 21 April 1709 (aged 80); Palazzo Carignano, Turin, Italy
- Spouse: Maria Angela Caterina d'Este (m. 1684)
- Issue Detail: Victor Amadeus I, Prince of Carignano
Names
- Italian: Emanuele Filiberto di Savoia; French: Emmanuel Philibert de Savoie
- House: Savoy-Carignano
- Father: Thomas Francis, Prince of Carignano
- Mother: Marie de Bourbon

Emmanuel Philibert of Savoy, 2nd Prince of Carignano (20 August 1628 – 23 April 1709), was the son and heir of Thomas Francis, Prince of Carignano. He constructed the Palazzo Carignano in Turin.

== Biography ==
Emmanuel Philibert was born 20 August 1628. He was the son of Thomas Francis, Prince of Carignano and Marie de Bourbon, Countess of Soissons. Emmanuel Philibert was born deaf, but eventually learned to communicate with others through lip-reading, and spoke few words.

In his youth, he was sent to the Spanish priest Don Manuel Ramirez, a famous teacher of the deaf in Spain. Under his guidance, Philibert learned to read and write. He went on to study a range of sciences under the guidance of Alessandro Tesauro, showing great aptitude.

In his twenties, Emmanuel Philibert followed his father during the last of his campaigns in Lombardy; two years later, he was named a colonel of cavalry in the service of his distant cousin Louis XIV, King of France.

In 1658, Emmanuel Philibert was promoted to lieutenant general by his cousin, Charles Emmanuel II, Duke of Savoy, during the latter's absence. In 1663, he was appointed governor of the city of Asti. When Charles Emmanuel died in 1675, his son and heir Victor Amadeus was just nine years old. Emmanuel Philibert became heir presumptive until Victor Amadeus had a male heir in 1699.

A connoisseur of architecture, Emmanuel Philibert commissioned the Palazzo Carignano in Turin, constructed between 1679 and 1684. He also commissioned major renovations to the castle of Racconigi. Guarino Guarini rebuilt an older dwelling, while the project for the park was entrusted to André le Nôtre, who realised magnificent French-style gardens.

In November 1701, Emmanuel Philibert acted as representative Philip V of Spain in a proxy marriage between Philip V and their cousin Maria Luisa. Emmanuel Philibert also acted as godfather to Maria Luisa's sister, Princess Maria Adelaide, mother of Louis XV.

Emmanuel Philibert died in Turin on 21 April 1709. In 1836, his remains were brought to the church of San Michele Della Chiusa in Turin.

== Marriage and issue ==
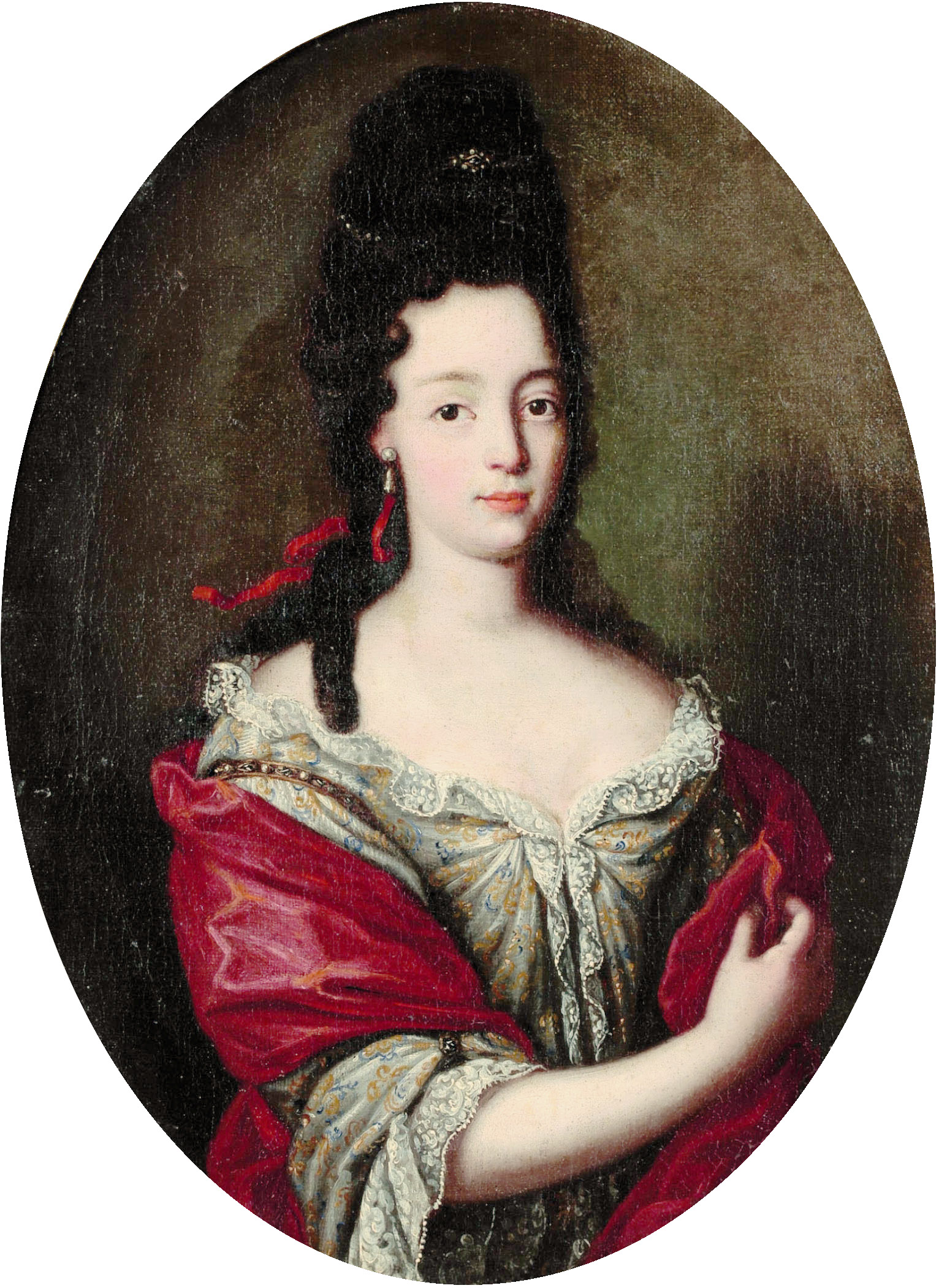
Maria Angela Caterina by a follower of Rigaud.

On 10 November 1684, Philibert married Maria Angela Caterina d'Este, the daughter of the late General Borso d'Este and Ippolita d'Este, Borso's niece, in the Castle of Racconigi. Maria Angela Caterina d'Este was a member of the ducal family of Modena. This match was opposed by Louis XIV of France, who had wanted Philibert to marry a French princess, given his position as heir to the duchy of Savoy (Marie Thérèse de Bourbon or one of her sisters was the proposed bride, as Louis XIV had no surviving legitimate daughters).

In 1685, after the intercession of Vittorio Amadeo II, Philibert obtained permission from Louis XIV to return to Turin. He and Caterina had two girls and two boys, of whom only their son Vittorio Amadeo would have children.

- Maria Isabella of Savoy (14 March 1687 – 2 May 1767) married thrice: Alfonso Tapparello, Count of Lagnasco, no issue; Conte Eugenio Ruffia di Cambiano, no issue; and Cavaliere Carlo Biandrate, no issue.
- Maria Vittoria of Savoy (12 February 1688 – 18 May 1763) married Onorato Malabayla, Count of Canale in 1721, had no issue.
- Victor Amadeus of Savoy (1 Mar 1690 – 4 April 1741) married Maria Vittoria Francesca of Savoy, illegitimate daughter of Victor Amadeus II of Sardinia and his mistress Jeanne Baptiste d'Albert de Luynes, had issue.
- Thomas Philippe Gaston of Savoy (10 May 1692 – 12 Sep 1715) never married, nor produced issue.

== Sources ==
- Chiodo, Domenico (2019). "Tesauro, Alessandro". Dizionario Biografico degli Italiani (in Italian). Istituto dell'Enciclopedia Italiana.
- Merlotti, Andrea (2008). "Maria Luisa Gabriella di Savoia, regina di Spagna". Dizionario Biografico degli Italiani. Istituto della Enciclopedia Italiana.
- Merlotti, Andrea (2018). "Savoia Carignano, Emanuele Filiberto Amedeo di". Dizionario Biografico degli Italiani (in Italian). Istituto della Enciclopedia Italiana.
- Orr, Clarissa Campbell (2004). "Introduction". In Orr, Clarissa Campbell (ed.). Queenship in Europe 1660-1815: The Role of the Consort. Cambridge University Press. pp. 1–15. ISBN 9780521814225.
