= Ducal Palace of Rivalta =

Palace in Reggio Emilia province, Italy

Coordinates: 44°39′37.8″N 10°35′30.8″E

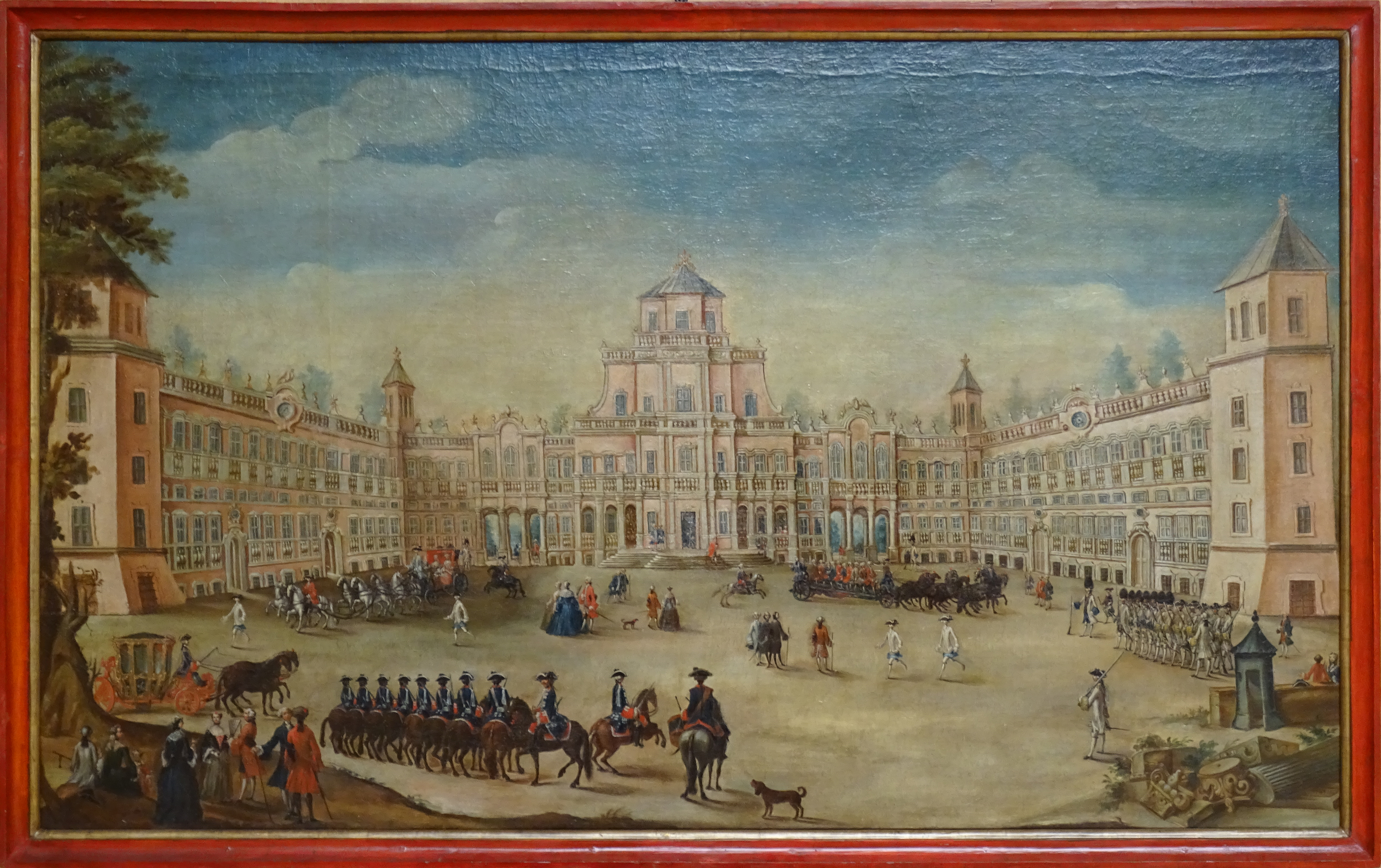
The Rivalta palace in its heyday during the 18th century

The Ducal Palace of Rivalta (Italian: Palazzo Ducale di Rivalta or Reggia di Rivalta or Villa Estense) was a baroque palace in Rivalta, just south of Reggio Emilia, Italy. The palace and its park were inspired by the Palace of Versailles. Until 1796, it served as a residence of the dukes of Modena from the House of Este, after which it fell in disrepair. Today, only the southern wing remains.

== History ==
In the Middle Ages, a tower was erected in the hamlet of Rivalta, just south of Reggio Emilia. In 1641, it was acquired by Borso d'Este (1605–1657), who was married to his niece Ippolita d'Este (1620–1656). They started renovating and expanding the palace between 1641 and 1644. It served as their main residence from 1647 until 1657. In 1675, the palace became the property of Borso's son, Foresto Franco d’Este (1652–1725), who was lord of Montecchio and marquess of Scandiano. In 1724, he granted the palace to Francesco III d'Este (1698–1780), crown prince and future duke of Modena.

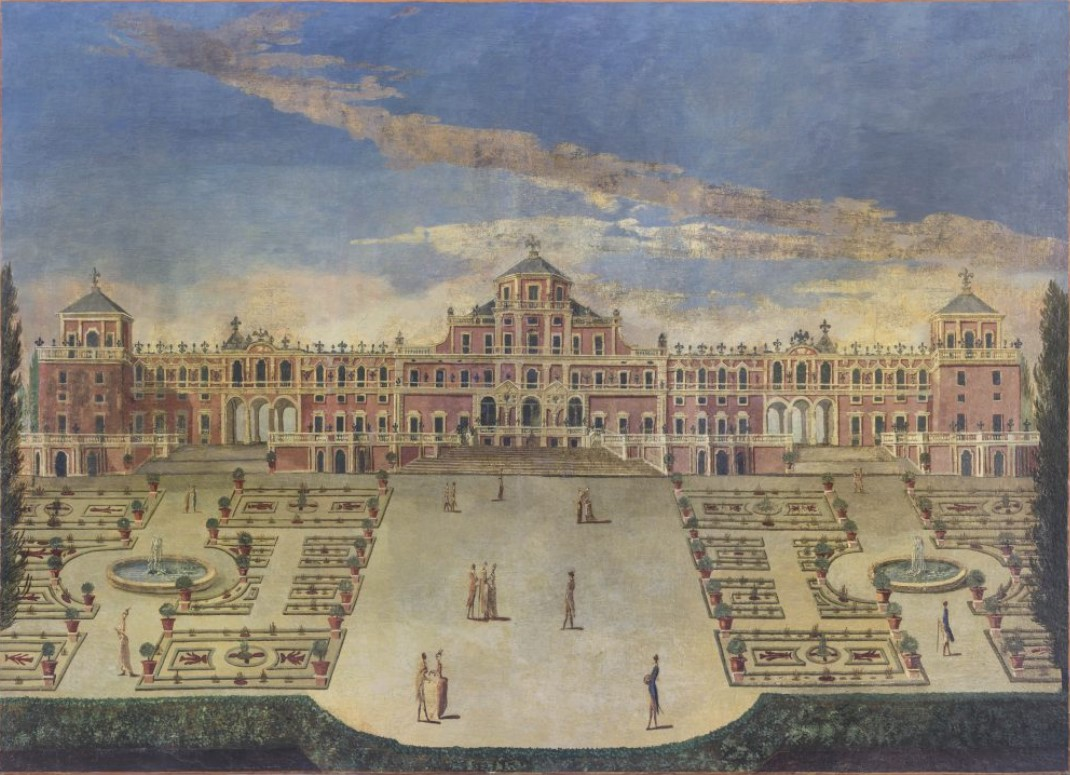
View from the garden by G Silvester (1790)

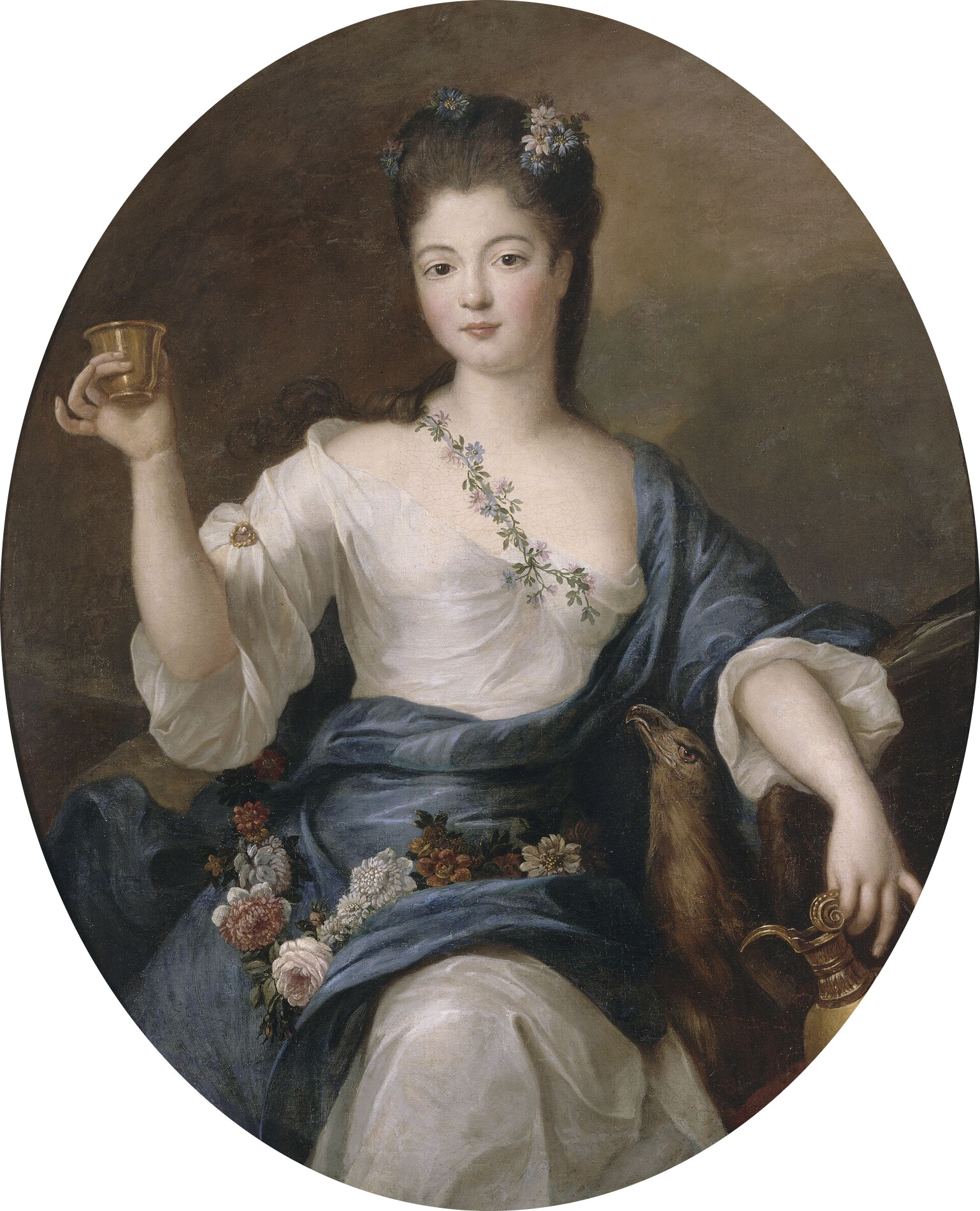
Charlotte Aglaé d'Orléans as Hebe, by Pierre Gobert

Francesco III d'Este was the son of duke Rinaldo d'Este (1655–1737), who wanted to establish friendly relationships with France. He attempted this by marrying his son with Charlotte Aglaé d'Orléans, the daughter of Philippe d'Orléans, Duke of Orléans, the Regent of France during the childhood of King Louis XV. Charlotte Aglaé received an enormous dowry of 1.8 million livres, half of which was contributed in the name of the young king, Louis XV, on orders of the Regent. From her adopted country, Charlotte Aglaé received a trousseau consisting of diamonds and portraits of her future husband. However, the marriage proved troublesome, mainly due to his new daughter-in-law's licentious behaviour.

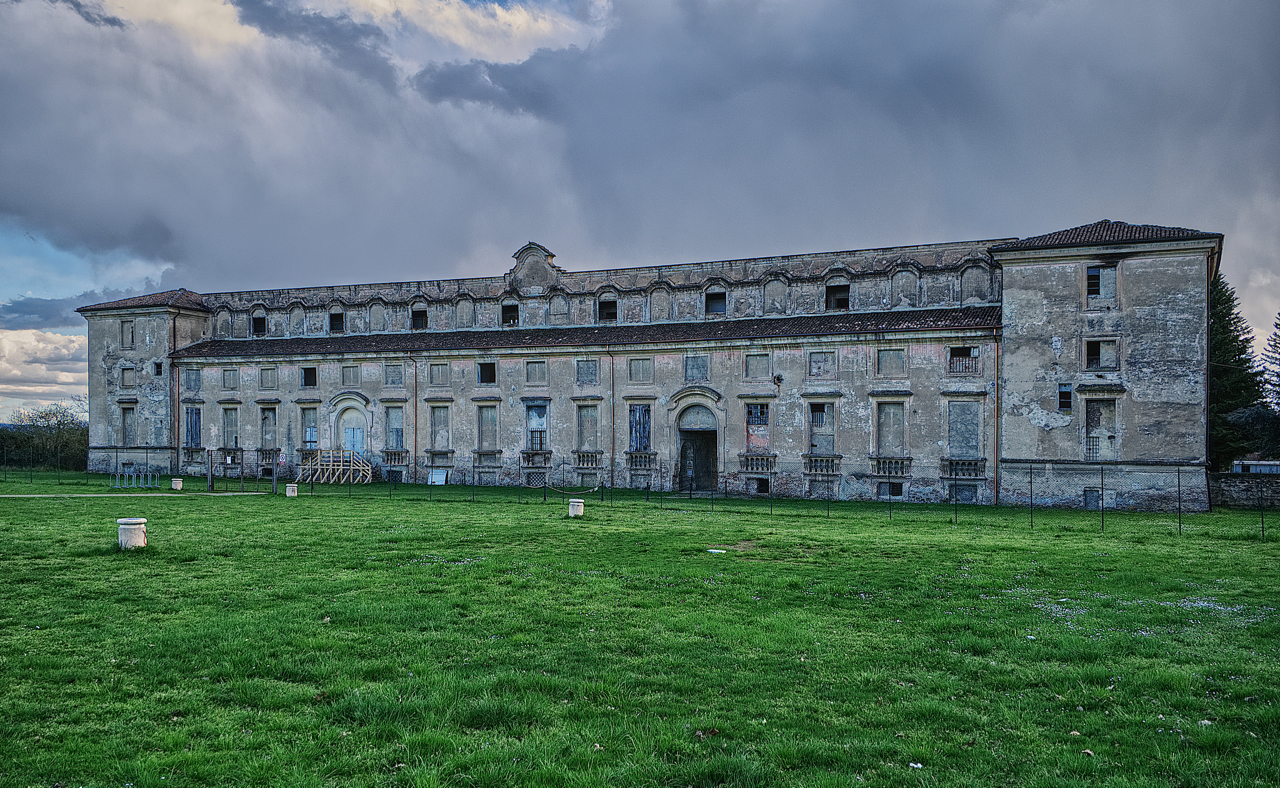
The remaining wing of the Rivalta palace

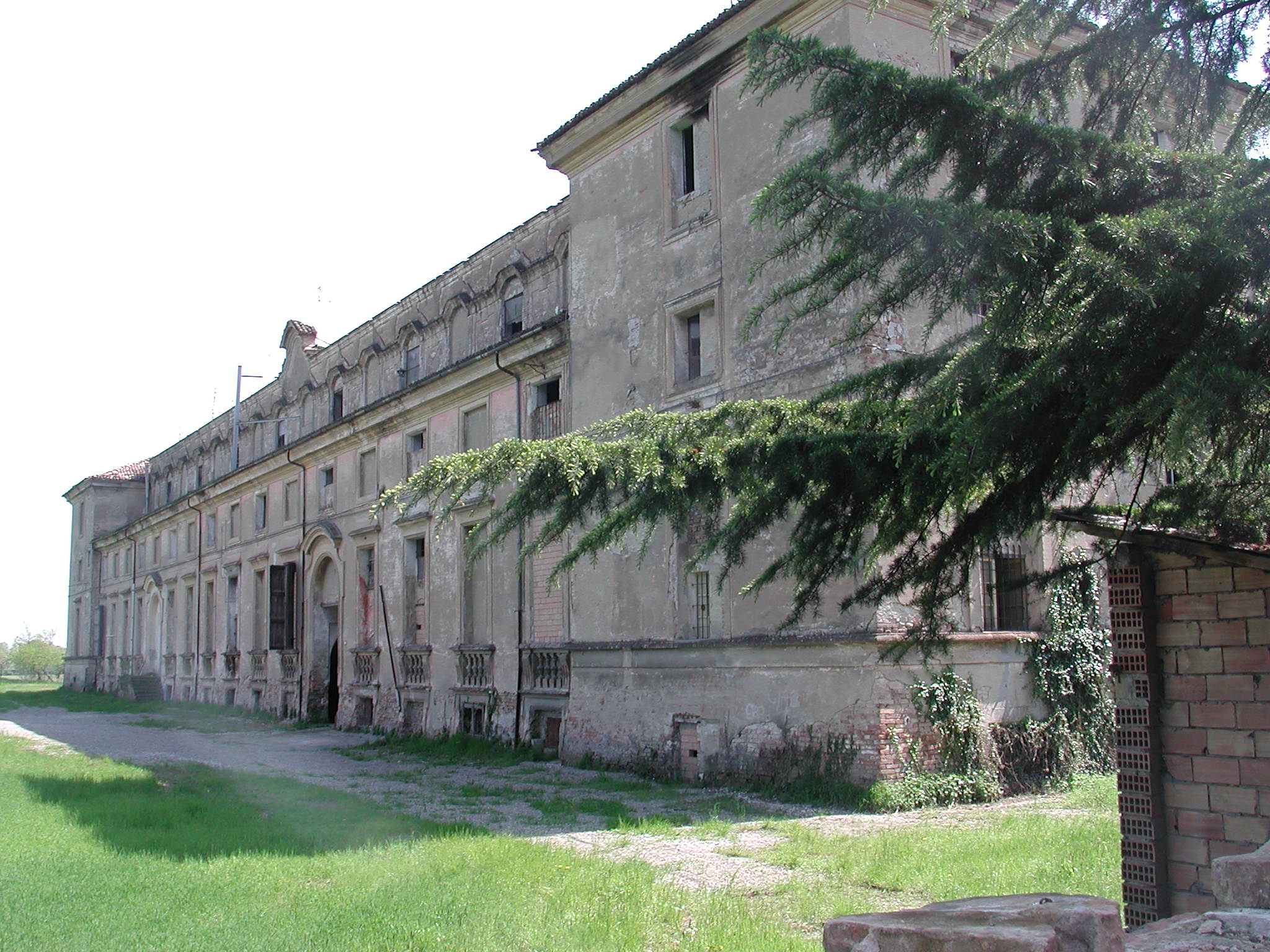
The remaining wing of the Rivalta palace

In order to keep peace at his court, Rinaldo allowed Francesco and Charlotte in 1724 to create their own residence in Rivalta. Inspired by the Palace of Versailles and the nearby palace of Colorno, they started to enlarge the existing villa into a luxurious residence: a main central body with two laterals wings and corner towers, creating a vast quadrangular courtyard, which was open to the west. The concept and design are attributed to Francesco himself with help of the architect Giovanni Maria Ferraroni. The latter was in 1730 succeeded by the brothers Francesco and Giovan Battista Bolognini. Also, the princely couple laid out an immense park surrounding the palace, and enlivened it with water features (using the water of the nearby Crostolo stream). Although building works were completed in 1730, continued maintenance was necessary during the next decades. In 1788, the palace was connected by a promenade to the city of Reggio Emilia.

Until the sixth decade of the eighteenth century, the palace was occupied by the ducal family. Their presence decreased as the duke was appointed as the Austrian governor of the Duchy of Milan. During which time, Francesco constructed the Palazzo Estense in Varese.

In 1796, the French army under Napoleon Bonaparte invaded Italy. The palace was confiscated, looted and partly demolished. It was used to house the local military command of the French. After the end of the occupation, the palace was handed over to a committee of local citizens. Around 1807, additional parts of the palace were demolished, and material was used for the building of private houses in the neighbourhood. Furniture became firewood, which was handed over to those who requested it. At the same time, the gardens were erased to make way for agriculture. Only the southern wing remained as did the chapel.

In 2004, the municipality of Reggio Emilia acquired the remains of the villa and garden with the aim to restore it. The Italian ministry of Culture provided funding in 2014. Also, other Este villas in the area were incorporated in the project, such as the Villa di Rivaltella and the Casino d’Este. The restoration of the south wing was completed in 2023, just as the park including water basins, and the so-called secret garden of Charlotte Aglaé. The latter is a reproduction of a historic 18th century design as depicted in Alfonso Tacoli's old drawing named ‘The Secret Garden of Carlotta d’Orleans’.

== See also ==
- Ducal Palace of Modena
- Ducal Palace of Sassuolo
- Palazzo Estense in Varese

== Literature ==
- Messori Roncaglia, M.T. (1928). "Il Palazzo estense di Rivalta". Cronache d'Arte (in Italian). 5: 285–297.
- Zuccardi Merli, U. (1937). "La zona ducale di Rivalta ed una famiglia di architetti bolognesi". Strenna del Pio Istituto Artigianelli (in Italian): 29–36.
- Messori, M.T. (1969). "La Versailles degli Estensi". L'Osservatore Politico Letterario (in Italian). 4: 83–90.
- Amorth, L. (1973). "Il Palazzo ducale di Rivalta". In Amorth, L.; Boccolari, G.; Roli Guidetti, c. (eds.). Residenze estensi. Modena: Banco S. Geminiano e S. Prospero. pp. 69–78.
- Roli Guidetti, C. (1973). "Il palazzo di Rivalta e il Casino della Vasca. Architettura e arredo artistico". In Amorth, L.; Boccolari, G.; Roli Guidetti, C. (eds.). Residenze estensi. Modena: Banco S. Geminiano e S. Prospero. pp. 69–78.
- Simonazzi, L. (1978). "Ferraroni. L'architetto che costruì la Villa ducale di Rivalta". Reggio Storia (in Italian). 1: 28–32.
- Nobili, U. (1982). "La villa di Rivalta". Reggio Storia (in Italian). 4: 4–12.
- Barigazzi, C. (1987). "Le origini della villa di Rivalta". Il Pescatore Reggiano (in Italian): 201–217.
- Barigazzi, C. (1990). "Quando a Rivalta si festeggiava l'Imperatrice Maria Teresa". Strenna del Pio Istituto Artigianelli (in Italian): 37–46.
- Bagnoli, G. (2002). "La costruzione del palazzo di Rivalta. Una piccola Versailles padana". Il Ducato estense. Finale Emilia. pp. 238–239.
- Baldini, G. (2002). "Reggio Emilia. Le delizie ducali di Rivalta, un mirabile sogno perduto". Atti e Memorie Deputazione di Storia Patria per le Antiche Provincie Modenesi (in Italian). 24: 167–216.
- Grassi, R. (2008). "Palazzo ducale di Rivalta. Parco del benessere e Reggia del buon vivere". Strenna del Pio Istituto Artigianelli (in Italian): 193–200.
- Baricchi, Walter; Cadoppi, Alberto (2016). Il Palazzo Ducale di Rivalta - La perduta Versailles reggiana (in Italian). Fondazione Cassa di Risparmio di Reggio Emilia Pietro Manodori. p. 192. ISBN 9788878981362.
- Cadoppi, A. (2017). "La Reggia di Rivalta: lo splendore, l'oblio, la rinascita: una delizia "degna di un re"". Reggio Storia (in Italian). 154: 3–11.
