= Virginia de' Medici =

Virginia
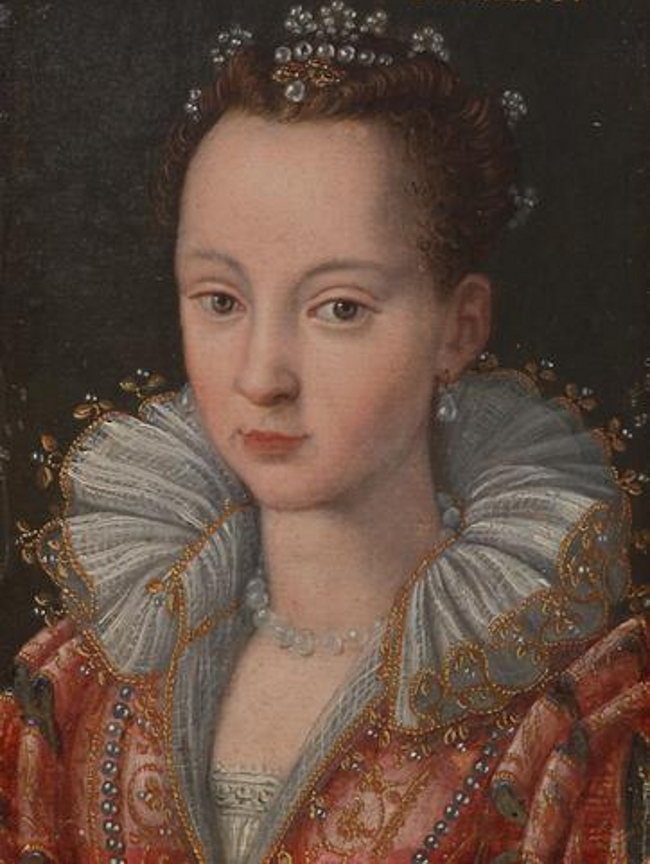
- Portrait by Alessandro Allori.

Duchess consort of Modena and Reggio
- Tenure: 27 October 1597 – 15 January 1615

Duchess consort of Ferrara
- Tenure: 27 October 1597 – 1598
- Born: 29 May 1568; Florence, Grand Duchy of Tuscany
- Died: 15 January 1615 (aged 46); Modena, Duchy of Modena
- Spouse: Cesare d'Este, Duke of Modena (m. 1586)
- Issue: Giulia d'Este; Laura, Duchess of Mirandola; Alfonso, Duke of Modena; Luigi, Lord of Montecchio; Caterina d'Este; Anna Eleonora d'Este; Ippolito Geminiano d'Este; Niccolò d'Este; Borso d'Este; Foresto d'Este
Names
- Virginia de' Medici
- House: Medici
- Father: Cosimo I de' Medici, Grand Duke of Tuscany
- Mother: Camilla Martelli

Virginia de' Medici (29 May 1568 – 15 January 1615) was an Italian princess, a member of the House of Medici and by marriage Duchess of Modena and Reggio.

Regent of the Duchy of Modena and Reggio in 1601 during the absence of her husband, she was able to protect the autonomy of the city of Modena from the attacks of the local Podestà and Judge. Her husband's infidelities increased her already erratic behavior and led to a permanent mental illness, which lasted until her death.

== Life ==
=== Early years ===
Born in Florence on 29 May 1568, Virginia was the illegitimate daughter of Cosimo I de' Medici, Grand Duke of Tuscany and his mistress Camilla Martelli. Her paternal grandparents were the famous condottiere Giovanni dalle Bande Nere and his wife Maria Salviati (in turn the granddaughter of Lorenzo the Magnificent) and her maternal grandparents were Antonio Martelli and Fiammetta Soderini, both members of the most important families among the Florentine patricians.

Virginia was born after the formal resignation of her father of the government on behalf of her half-brother Francesco. Cosimo I contracted a morganatic marriage with Camilla Martelli on 29 March 1570 on the advice of Pope Pius V, and this allowed him to legitimize their daughter on the principle of per subsequens. Since that time, she lived with her parents at the Villa di Castello during the summer and in Pisa in winter. Cosimo I's older children resented their father's second marriage, and after the death of the Grand Duke in 1574, they imprisoned Camilla in the Florentine convent of Murate.

Despite the controversy about her illegitimate birth and ambiguous position in the Grand Ducal house, Virginia's older brothers began negotiations with the House of Sforza of a marriage between her and one of its members. In 1581 she was betrothed to Francesco Sforza, Count of Santa Fiora, but the wedding didn't take place because the groom chose the ecclesiastical career and became a Cardinal. After this, it was decided to arrange her marriage with a member of the House of Este with the purpose to improve the relations between both families and break the isolation of the Grand Duchy of Tuscany from the other Italian states. Virginia's half-brother Cardinal Ferdinando agreed with Cardinal Luigi d'Este in approving the marriage of his nephew and Virginia. In addition, the second wife of Grand Duke Francesco I, Bianca Cappello, also contributed to the conclusion of negotiations and the formation of this alliance.

=== Marriage and issue ===
In Florence on 6 February 1586 Virginia married Cesare d'Este, son of Alfonso, Marquis of Montecchio. To celebrate this event was represented the comedy "l’Amico Fido", written by Giovanni de' Bardi and with the lyrics of Alessandro Striggio and Cristofano Malvezzi, and in Ferrara the poet Torquato Tasso dedicated a Cantata to the newlyweds.

The union produced ten children, six sons and four daughters:

- Giulia d'Este (26 April 1588–1645); died unmarried.
- Laura d'Este (1590–1630); married Alessandro I Pico, Duke of Mirandola
- Alfonso III d'Este, Duke of Modena (1591–1644), Duke of Modena from 1628; married Princess Isabella of Savoy
- Luigi d'Este, Marquis of Montecchio and Scandiano (1594–1664), General at the Imperial army
- Caterina d'Este (1595–1618); died unmarried.
- Anna Eleonora d'Este (1597–1651); a Poor Clare nun under the name of Sister Angela Caterina and later Abbess of the Monastery of Santa Chiara of Carpi.
- Ippolito Geminiano d'Este (15 August 1599–1647), Knight of the Order of Malta and Commander of the Order of the Holy Sepulchre
- Niccolo d'Este (1601–1640), Captain at the Imperial Army; married Sveva d'Avalos
- Borso d'Este (1605–1657), Colonel at the Imperial Army and later General in the French Army; married Ippolita d'Este (illegitimate daughter of his brother Luigi)
- Foresto d'Este (1606–1639), Captain at the Imperial Army

At the end of February 1586 Virginia and Cesare arrived in Ferrara. They stayed at the Palazzo Diamanti, a gift of Cardinal Luigi d'Este, Cesare's uncle, who later bequeathed him all his possessions. One year later (1587), Virginia became in Marchioness consort of Montecchio after the death of her father-in-law.

After the extinction of the legitimate line of the House of Este with the death of Duke Alfonso II on 27 October 1597 without issue, Cesare inherited the headship and all the possessions of the family; in consequence, Virginia became the Duchess consort of Ferrara, Modena and Reggio, Princess consort of Carpi, Princess of the Holy Roman Empire, Duchess consort of Chartres and Montargis, Countess consort of Gisors, Viscountess consort of Caen, Bayeux and Falaise. However, the rule over Ferrara was short-lived: although Emperor Rudolf II recognized the rights of Cesare over Modena and Reggio (both Imperial fiefs), Pope Clement VIII didn't recognized Cesare's succession in Ferrara (nominally a Papal fief) on grounds of doubtful legitimacy. On 15 January 1598 the Duchy of Ferrara was officially abolished and returned to the Papal States, despite Cesare's attempts to obtain the help of the major European powers. Cesare, with his family and court, were forced to move to Modena, which became the new capital of the dynasty. In 1599 Cesare obtained the Lordship of Sassuolo, but in 1601 the Parlement of Paris stripped him of all the domains and titles in the Kingdom of France.

=== Mental illness and death ===
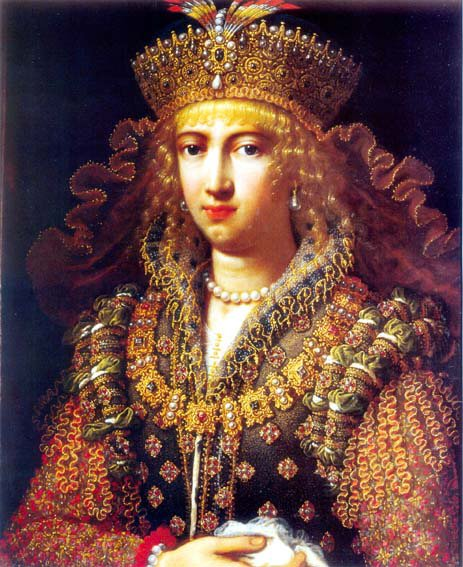
Virginia de' Medici, wearing a characteristic necklace that belonged to Camilla Martelli, Virginia's mother.

In 1596, Virginia manifested the first signs of mental illness and suffered from this condition until her death. Nevertheless, she coped with her motherly duties with her numerous offspring and showed herself as a clever and far-sighted ruler when in January 1601, in the absence of her husband (who was in Reggio) the heavily pregnant Duchess took the position of Regent. During this time she stopped the attempts of the Podesta and Judge of Modena to deprive her of the government. However, Virginia was unable to control her unpredictable anger fits: when in March 1608 her confessor, the Jesuit Jerome Bondinari, claimed that she was possessed by the devil, the Duchess attacked him violently with shouts and nearly beat him to death with a stick. After this, exorcism sessions were held to cure her, during which it became clear that Virginia's having married against her will set off her mental illness and it worsened due to the infidelities of her husband. The attempts to expel the demons in her ultimately caused Virginia to become completely insane. She only recovered her sense on the day of her death; on her deathbed, she blessed all her children and died peacefully. (Note: Virginia's daughters Laura (later Duchess consort of Mirandola and Marchioness consort of Concordia) and Anna Eleonora (later Sister Angela Caterina) inherited her mental illness, which appeared in their adulthood.)

Virginia died on 15 January 1615 in Modena aged 46; there were rumors that her husband poisoned her. The memorial service took place on 27 February at Modena Cathedral and celebrated by the Jesuit Agostino Mascardi. She was buried in the crypt of the House of Este in the Church of St. Vincent in Modena.

== Bibliography ==
- Cesati, Franco (1999). The Medici: story of a European dynasty. Florence: Mandragora. pp. 81, 82, 136, 141. ISBN 978-8-88-595737-4.
- Condren, John (2024). Louis XIV and the Peace of Europe: French Diplomacy in Northern Italy, 1659–1701. Taylor & Francis.
- Schleuse, Paul (2015). Singing Games in Early Modern Italy: The Music Books of Orazio Vecchi. Indiana University Press. ISBN 9780253015044.

Virginia de' Medici House of Medici Born: 29 May 1568 Died: 15 January 1615
Royal titles
Preceded by Margherita Gonzaga	Duchess consort of Ferrara; 27 October 1597 – 1598	To the Papal State
Preceded by Margherita Gonzaga	Duchess consort of Modena and Reggio; 27 October 1597 – 15 January 1615	Vacant Title next held by Maria Caterina Farnese
