= House of Savoy-Carignano =

Noble family; cadet branch of the House of Savoy

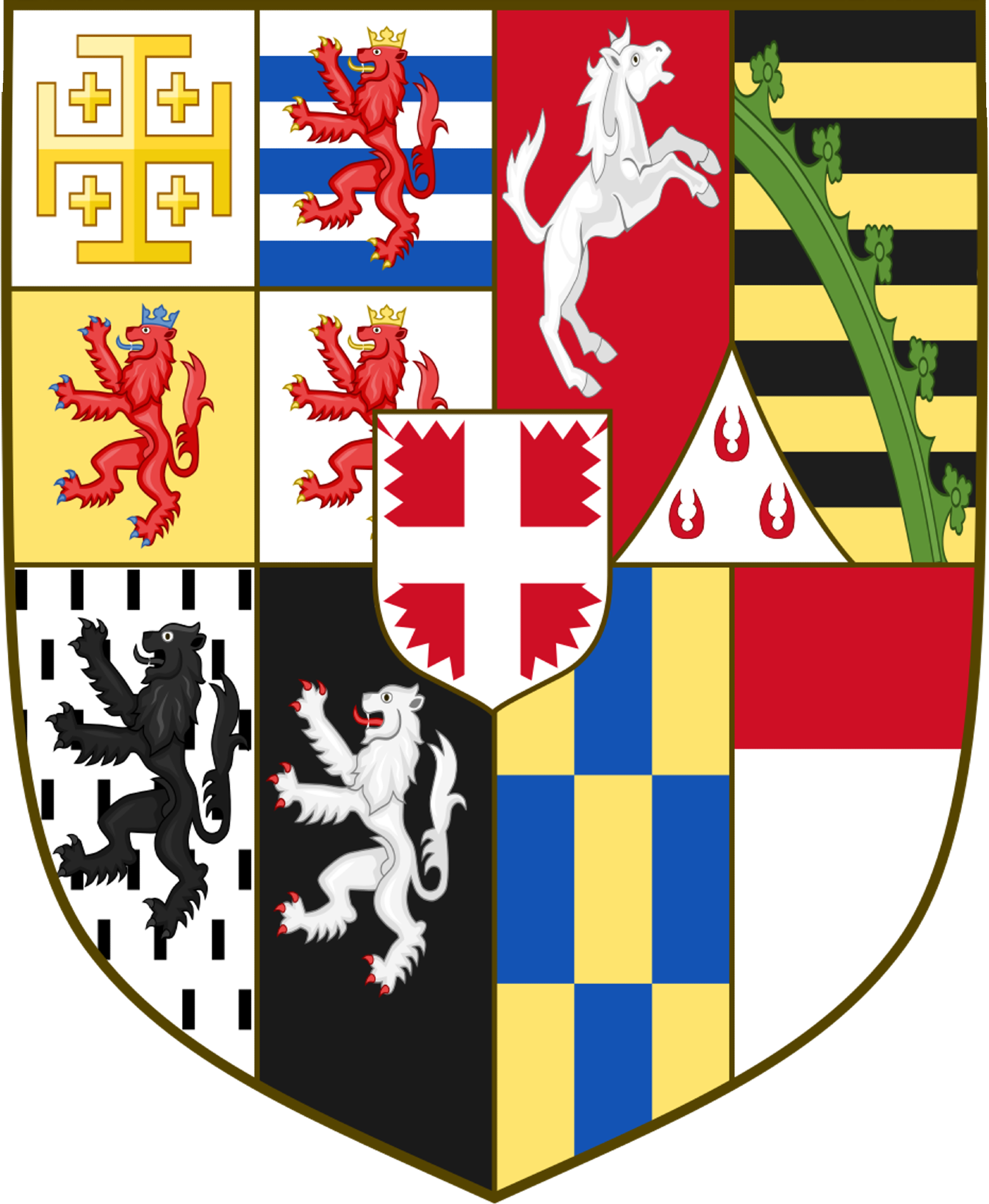
- Arms of the House of Savoy-Carignano
- Parent family: Savoy
- Country: Kingdom of Italy; Kingdom of Sardinia; Kingdom of France; Spanish Empire; Independent State of Croatia
- Etymology: Savoy and Carignano
- Founded: 1620; 406 years ago
- Founder: Prince of Carignano
- Current head: Disputed: Emanuele Filiberto of Savoy, Prince of Venice; Prince Aimone, Duke of Aosta
- Titles: King of Italy; King of Sardinia
- Deposition: June 12, 1946; 80 years ago: Umberto II left Italy as a result of the institutional referendum

The House of Savoy-Carignano (Italian: Savoia-Carignano; French: Savoie-Carignan) originated as a cadet branch of the House of Savoy. It was founded by Thomas Francis, Prince of Carignano (1596–1656), an Italian military commander who was the fifth son of Charles Emmanuel I, Duke of Savoy. His descendants were accepted as princes étrangers at the court of France, where some held prominent positions. Upon the extinction of the main Savoy line, they eventually came to reign as kings of Sardinia from 1831 to 1861, and as kings of Italy from 1861 until the dynasty's deposition in 1946. The Savoy-Carignano family also briefly supplied a king each to Spain and Croatia, as well as queens consort to Bulgaria and Portugal.

== Origin ==
Born in Turin, Thomas Francis of Savoy was the youngest of the five legitimate sons of Charles Emmanuel I, sovereign Duke of Savoy, by his wife, Catherine Micaela of Spain (daughter of King Philip II of Spain and his consort, Elizabeth of Valois, a French princess). While still a young man, he bore arms in Italy in the service of the king of Spain.

Although in previous reigns younger sons of Savoy had been granted rich appanages in Switzerland (Genevois and Vaud), Italy (Aosta), or France (Nemours and Bresse), the Savoy dukes found that this inhibited their own aggrandizement while encouraging intra-dynastic strife and regional secession. Not only did Thomas Francis have older brothers but he was just one of the twenty-one acknowledged children of Charles Emmanuel. While only nine of these were legitimate, the others, being the widowed duke's offspring by noble mistresses, appear to have been generously endowed or dowered during their father's lifetime.

The fief of Carignano had belonged to the Savoys since 1418, and the fact that it was part of the Principality of Piedmont, only twenty kilometers south of Turin, meant that it could be a princedom for Thomas in name only, being endowed neither with independence nor revenues of substance. Instead of receiving a significant patrimony, Thomas was wed in 1625 to Marie de Bourbon, sister and co-heiress of Louis, Count of Soissons, who would be killed in 1641 while fomenting rebellion against Cardinal Richelieu.

== France ==
In anticipation of this inheritance, Thomas Francis and Marie did not establish themselves at his brother's ducal capital, Turin, but dwelt in Paris, where Marie enjoyed the exalted rank of a princesse du sang, being a second cousin of King Louis XIII. It was arranged that Thomas Francis, as son of a reigning monarch, would hold the rank of first among the princes étrangers at the French court—taking precedence even before the formerly all-powerful House of Guise, whose kinship to the sovereign Duke of Lorraine was more remote.

Thomas Francis was appointed Grand Maître of the king's household, briefly replacing the traitorous Grand Condé. He engaged the services of the distinguished grammarian and courtier Claude Favre de Vaugelas as tutor for his children. The prospect of Marie's eventual succession to the Swiss principality of Neuchâtel, near Savoy, was foiled in 1643 by the king's decision to legitimate Louis Henri de Bourbon, chevalier de Soissons (1640–1703), a son of Marie's late brother. Although this prevented the substitution of Savoyard for French influence in that region, it left Thomas with little more than the empty title of prince de Carignan. Marie eventually inherited her brother's main holding in France, the county of Soissons; this would be established as a secundogeniture for the French branch of the family. After Thomas Francis, the senior branch of his descendants repatriated to Savoy, alternately marrying French, Italian, and German princesses.

== Service with Spain ==
The first recorded military service of Thomas Francis is as a commander in the Savoyard army under his father against France during the War of the Mantuan Succession in 1630. Cardinal Mazarin induced him to become in effect a French agent at the Savoyard court between 1630 and 1632. When the new Duke Victor Amadeus I was forced to accept French occupation of Pinerolo in the Peace of Cherasco in 1631, there was widespread dissatisfaction in Savoy, and Thomas Francis, with his brother, Prince Maurice, withdrew from the duchy to join the forces of Spain, prompting Victor Amadeus to confiscate his uncles' Italian revenues. Although his kinship to both the French and Spanish royal families suggested that he could be useful to Spanish interests, Thomas Francis was not entirely trusted, and was obliged to send his wife and children to Madrid as hostages.

When France launched the Franco-Spanish War (1635–1659), Thomas Francis served under the Cardinal-Infante Ferdinand, brother of Philip IV in the Spanish Netherlands. Savoy was reluctantly dragged into the fighting alongside the French, consequently Thomas Francis was strictly fighting against his own homeland. He was completely defeated and his army entirely killed, captured, or scattered—the first in an unbroken career of military defeats. He managed to rally the remnants at Namur, then retreated before the numerically superior French and Dutch forces, and he probably served the rest of the campaign with Ferdinand. In 1636, Thomas Francis served with the Cardinal-Infante Ferdinand who organised a joint Spanish-Imperialist army for a major invasion of France from the Spanish Netherlands. The invasion was initially very successful, and seemed capable of reaching Paris, where there was a great panic; if Ferdinand and Thomas had pushed on, they might have ended the war at this point. Instead, they both felt that continuing to Paris was too risky, so they stopped the advance. Later in the campaign, Thomas had problems with the Imperialist general Ottavio Piccolomini, who refused to accept orders from the Prince as a Spanish commander, arguing that his Imperialist troops were an independent force. In this year, when his brother-in-law Louis de Bourbon, comte de Soissons, fled from France after his failed conspiracy against Cardinal Richelieu, Thomas Francis acted as intermediary between Soissons and the Spanish in negotiations which led to a formal alliance between the count and Philip IV of Spain concluded 28 June 1637, although within a month Soissons had reconciled with France. In 1638, Thomas served in Spanish Flanders, helping to defend the fortress-city of Saint-Omer against a French siege.

== Piedmontese Civil War ==
After seeking Spanish support late in 1638 for action against the Regent Christine of Savoy, Madame Royale, Thomas went to Milan early in 1639, and alongside Spanish forces invaded Piedmont, where many towns welcomed him. He took Turin by knavery but the French continued to control its citadel. In 1640, he held the city in the multi-layered siege of Turin. After repeated bouts of negotiations with the Regent and the French, Thomas Francis made peace with both in the first half of 1642, unblushingly changed sides, and started fighting with the French against the Spaniards.

=== Service with France ===
For the rest of 1642 and part of the 1643 campaigns, Thomas Francis commanded Savoyard forces fighting alongside the French under Henri II d'Orléans, duc de Longueville, against the Spanish, generally along the Piedmont–Milan border; when Longueville was recalled home, he succeeded him as allied commander-in-chief, with Henri de la Tour d'Auvergne, Vicomte de Turenne, as his second-in-command. Thomas Francis was given the supreme command only because of his birth; another French general, César de Choiseul du Plessis Praslin, observed a few years later that French marshals would only serve under someone who was superior to them in social rank, and Thomas Francis, with his blood relationship to the French and Spanish royal families, was the only candidate.

By late summer, both Thomas Francis and Turenne were seriously ill and du Plessis Praslin was in temporary command. Thomas Francis led the joint armies again in 1644, taking Santya and Asti; he also tried to take Finale Ligure but gave up the attempt, apparently because he feared this valuable port would end up under French control rather than Savoyard. In 1645, now commanding with du Plessis Praslin, he took Vigevano, and repulsed a Spanish attempt to block his withdrawal at the River Mora, the nearest he ever came to a success in the field. In 1646, Thomas Francis was put in command of the French expedition sent south to take the Tuscan forts, after which he was to advance further south to Naples, drive out the Spanish and put himself on the throne of the kingdom; but the expedition set off late, and when he besieged Orbetello, the supporting French fleet was defeated by the Spanish and he was forced to raise the siege and conduct a difficult retreat, which he performed poorly. In the 1647 campaign, Thomas Francis is mentioned as commanding alongside the French general in the forces sent across north Italy to work with the Duke of Modena Francesco I d'Este who had just allied with France and opened up a 'second front' against the Spaniards in Milan, though Mazarin confessed that he had appointed Thomas only because he feared that, if left behind in Piedmont, the Prince's restless spirit would make more trouble.

During his absence, Regent Christine had gained control of the fortresses granted to Thomas Francis as part of the settlement of the Piedmontese Civil War (legally, these reverted to ducal control when the Duke came of age, which under Savoyard law Charles Emmanuel did in 1648, though his mother remained in control of the government; Christine, accompanied by her son and part of the ducal army, entered Ivrea and dismissed Thomas' personal garrison; she appointed Thomas Francis instead as governor or Asti and Alba, positions which sweetened the blow but were entirely under ducal control, not guaranteed by treaty. When he returned to Piedmont, Thomas had no choice but to accept the fait accompli, and soon after this he went to live in Paris. During the Fronde, Thomas Francis linked himself closely with Cardinal Mazarin who, although effectively chief minister of France, was like him an Italian outsider at the French court. In the early 1650s, Thomas Francis was seen as an important member of Mazarin's party, closely linked to the Cardinal, regularly seen in conference with him, and active in his support. In 1651 when Mazarin had been forced into exile, the Prince was for a time brought onto the conseil du roi, and an admittedly very hostile contemporary Marie de Nemours, the Duchess of Nemours, described him as a "prime minister without being aware of it". There were suggestions that Mazarin's opponents within the court had raised him up as a rival to the cardinal with the Queen Regent Anne of Austria; this is unlikely, especially since Mazarin himself urged the Queen to follow Thomas' advice, and it is more probable that Mazarin backed the Prince as someone who would keep other rivals from gaining control in his absence but who would never have the status within France to set himself up as a permanent replacement for the Cardinal. By the time Mazarin returned from his second and last exile in February 1653, Thomas Francis, who accompanied the court to St Denis to welcome the Cardinal home, was insignificant again—an analysis of Mazarin's close colleagues at this time by the later historian Pierre Adolphe Chéruel made no mention of him.

In January 1654, when the last of the ceremonial offices formerly belonging to the rebel leader Louis II de Bourbon, Prince de Condé, were disposed of, Prince Thomas Francis was made Grand Maitre. The Franco-Spanish war had been continuing in north Italy, and late in 1654 the increasing Savoyard hostility to the current French commander Grancey led to a search for a new allied commander-in-chief; the French would have preferred to send the Duke of York (later King James II); as he was unacceptable to Turin, Thomas Francis was appointed as joint commander, akthough his wife was held in France almost as a hostage for his good behaviour. On 16 December 1654, he arrived in Turin to a ceremonial welcome by the French troops and an unexpectedly friendly reception by Duke Charles Emmanuel. After the 1655 campaign, Thomas Francis returned to Turin where he died the following January.

== Second generation ==
Among the children of Prince Thomas Francis and Marie de Bourbon-Soissons were:

- Princess Louise Christine (1627–1689), who married in 1654 to Ferdinand Maximilian of Baden-Baden (1625–1669).
- Emmanuel Philibert, 2nd Prince of Carignano, lived in Italy, becoming governor of Ivrea in 1644, and of Asti in 1663. In 1684, he married in Racconigi, Princess Angela Catherina d'Este (1656–1722), granddaughter of Cesare I d'Este, Duke of Modena. Because he was deaf-mute, the marriage shocked his mother, infuriated his sister-in-law Olympia Mancini, injured the inheritance prospects of his French nephews and nieces, and so offended Louis XIV that Francis II, Duke of Modena, felt obliged to banish from his realm the bride's kinsman, who had acted as the couple's intermediary.
- Prince Eugène Maurice of Savoy (1635–1673), Count of Soissons and Dreux, married Olympia Mancini, most notorious of the Mazarinettes, intrigante of the affaire des posions and exiled in succession from both France and Spain. He also the progenitor of the House of Savoy-Soissons. This couple's son, Prince Eugene of Savoy, spurned by France due to his mother's disgrace when he sought to take up his place there as a prince étranger and military captain, defected to the service of the Holy Roman Emperor, where his generalship afflicted France for decades.

== Subsequent generations ==
The subsequent Princes of Carignano, with their respective dates of tenure in brackets, were as follows:

- Emmanuel Philibert, Prince of Carignano (1656–1709), married Angélique Catherine d'Este.
- Victor Amadeus I, Prince of Carignano (1709–1741), married Maria Vittoria of Savoy, illegitimate daughter of Victor Amadeus II of Sardinia and his mistress Jeanne Baptiste d'Albert de Luynes.
- Louis Victor, Prince of Carignano (1741–1778), married Landgravine Christine of Hesse-Rotenburg.
- Victor Amadeus II, Prince of Carignano (1778–1780), married Joséphine of Lorraine.
- Charles Emmanuel, Prince of Carignano (1780–1800), married Princess Maria Christina of Saxony.
- Charles Albert, Prince of Carignano (1800–1831), married Maria Theresa of Tuscany, and later became Charles Albert of Sardinia, King of Sardinia from 1831. He was the father of Victor Emmanuel II of Sardinia and later Italy, and of Ferdinand, Duke of Genoa.

== Coat of arms ==
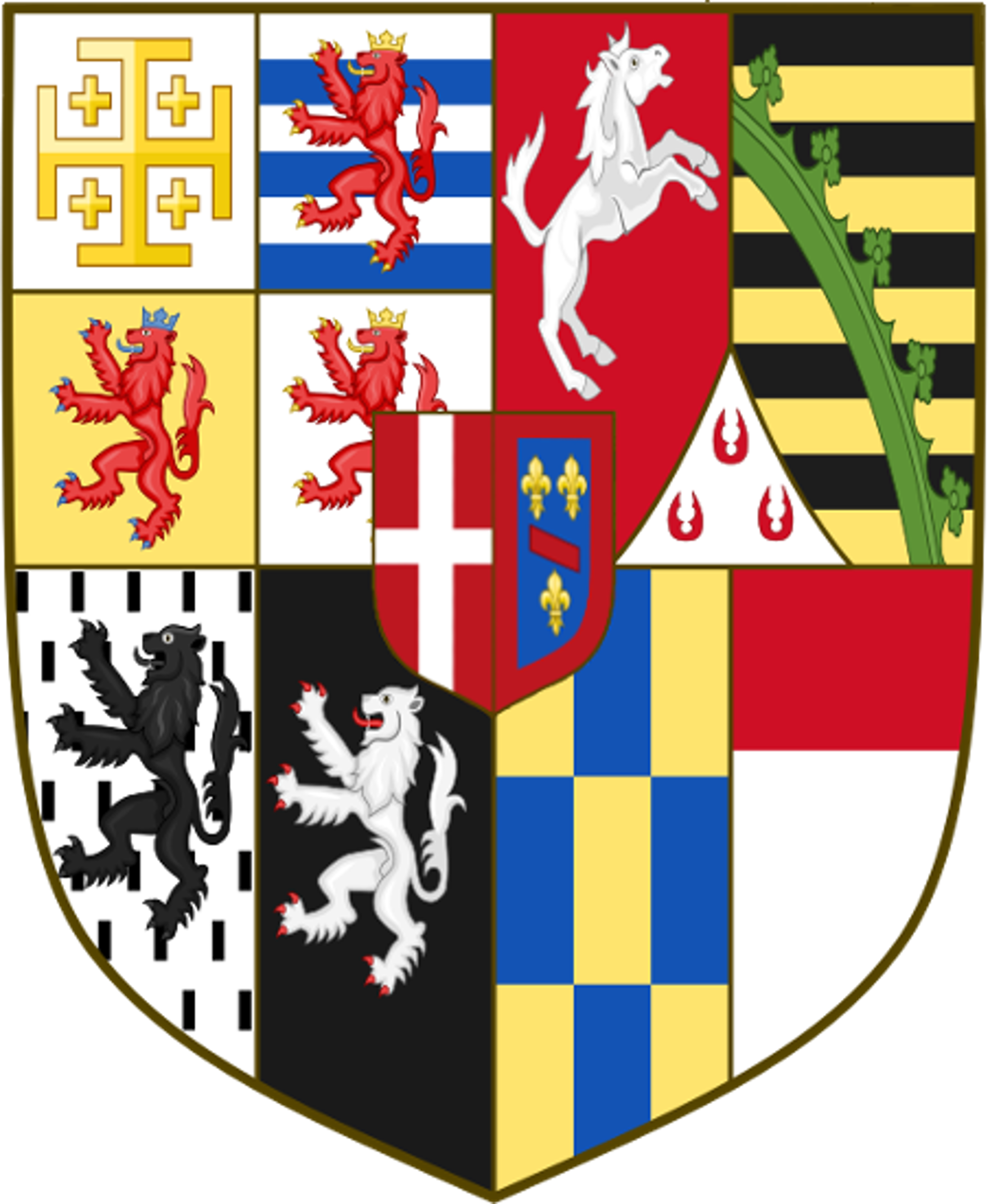
Arms of the Soissons branch of the House of Savoy-Carignano

Prince of Carignano as a Knight of the Supreme Order of the Most Holy Annunciation

Coat of arms of Kingdom of Sardinia (1720–1861)

Greater coat of arms of Kingdom of Italy (1861–1878)

== See also ==
- Counts of Soissons
- Counts of Villafranca
- Marie Thérèse Louise of Savoy, Princesse de Lamballe
- Princess of Carignano
