= Cesare d'Este =

Duke of Modena and Reggio from 1597 to 1628

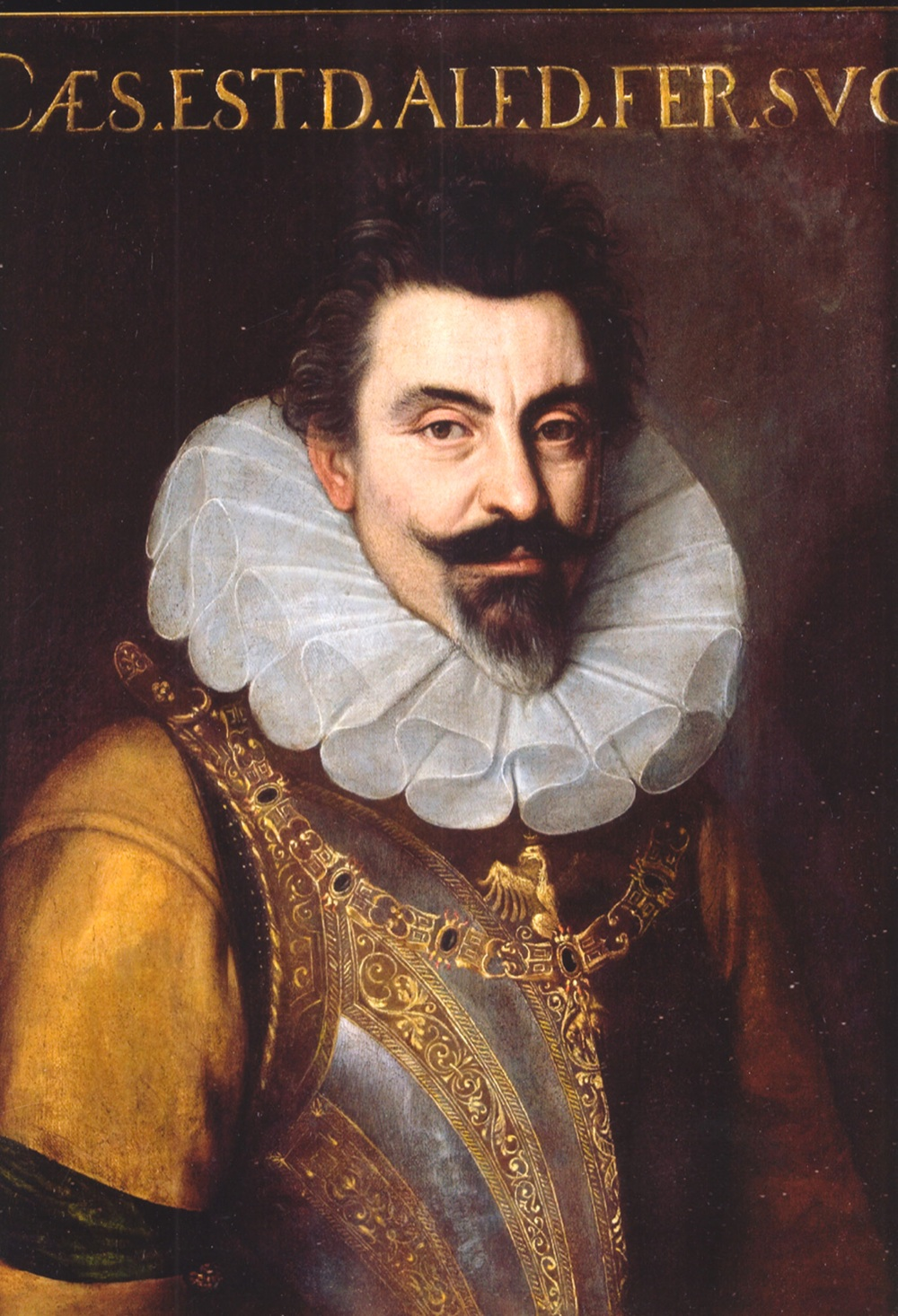
- Portrait by Frans Pourbus the Younger (1606)

Duke of Modena and Reggio
- Reign: 27 October 1597 – 11 December 1628
- Predecessor: Alfonso II d'Este as Duke of Ferrara, Modena, and Reggio
- Successor: Alfonso III d'Este
- Born: 8 October 1562; Ferrara, Duchy of Ferrara
- Died: 11 December 1628 (aged 66); Ferrara
- Spouse: Virginia de' Medici (m. 1586; died 1615)
- Issue: Alfonso, Duke of Modena; Laura, Duchess of Mirandola; Luigi, Lord of Montecchio; Borso d'Este
- House: Este
- Father: Alfonso d'Este, Marquis of Montecchio
- Mother: Giulia della Rovere
- Religion: Roman Catholicism

Cesare d'Este (8 October 1562 – 11 December 1628) was Duke of Modena and Reggio from 1597 until his death.

== Biography ==
Born in Ferrara, Cesare was the son of Alfonso d'Este, Marquis of Montecchio and Giulia della Rovere. His father was the fourth son of Alfonso I d'Este

When Alfonso II died without heirs in the October 1597, Cesare claimed the duchy of Ferrara. Pope Clement VIII raised an army to contest the claim, and excommunicated Cesare. Denied French assistance, Cesare retreated to Modena, entering the city in January 1598 and making it his new capital. Initially there were quarrels between the local nobility and the Ferrarese nobles who had arrived with the Duke; Cesare's first years were also troubled by the attempt at independence of Maro Pio of Sassuolo, and a war against Lucca for the possession of Garfagnana.

== Marriage and issue ==
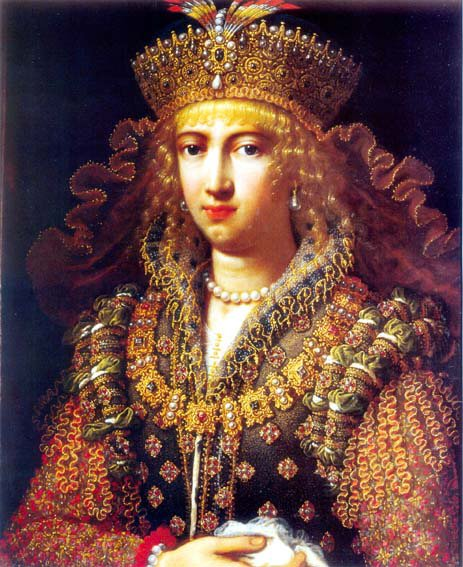
Virginia de' Medici, wearing a characteristic necklace which had formerly belonged to her mother Camilla Martelli.

On 30 January 1586, Cesare married Virginia de' Medici, daughter of Cosimo I de' Medici, who suffered increasing symptoms of madness until her death in 1615. He was succeeded by his son, Alfonso.

- Giulia d'Este (1588–1645) died unmarried;
- Alfonso III d'Este, Duke of Modena (1591–1644), married Isabella of Savoy
- Laura d'Este (1594–1630) married Alessandro I Pico, Duke of Mirandola
- Luigi d'Este, Lord of Montecchio and Scandiano (1593/1594–1664)
- Caterina d'Este (1595–1618)
- Anna Eleonora d'Este (1597–1651), died unmarried, nun
- Ippolito d'Este (1599–1647)
- Niccolo d'Este (1601–1640), married Sveva d'Avalos, no issue;
- Borso d'Este (1605–1657) married Ippolita d'Este
- Foresto d'Este (1606–1639/1640)

== Sources ==
- Aron-Beller, Katherine (2020). Jews on Trial: The Papal Inquisition in Modena, 1598–1638. Manchester University Press. ISBN 9781526151629.
- Cox, Virginia; Sampson, Lisa (2023). Drama, Poetry and Music in Late-Renaissance Italy: The life and works of Leonora Bernardi. Translated by Wainwright, Anna. UCL Press.
- Balchin, Paul N. (2022). The Development of Cities in Northern and Central Italy: During the Renaissance. Routledge.
- Rundle, David, ed. (1999). "Este dynasty". The Hutchinson Encyclopedia Of The Renaissance. Helicon Publishing. ISBN 9780813336701.
- Condren, John (2024). Louis XIV and the Peace of Europe: French Diplomacy in Northern Italy, 1659–1701. Taylor & Francis.
- Stras, Laurie (2012). "The "Ricreationi per monache" of Suor Annalena Aldobrandini". Renaissance Studies. 26 (1: Musical Materials and Cultural Spaces (FEBRUARY)): 34–59.
- Tuohy, Thomas (1996). Herculean Ferrara: Ercole D'Este (1471-1505) and the Invention of a Ducal Capital. Cambridge University Press.

Cesare d'Este House of Este Born: 8 October 1562 Died: 11 December 1628
Regnal titles
Preceded by Alfonso II	Duke of Modena and Reggio; 1597–1628	Succeeded by Alfonso III
