= Andrew Morrogh =

British art historian and academic

Andrew Dermot Morrogh is a British art historian and academic. He has taught in the United States at the University of Oregon College of Design and at the Department of Art History at the University of Chicago. He has published books and articles on the art and architecture of the Italian Renaissance. Among his publications is the catalogue of an exhibition he organised for the Uffizi, Disegni di Architetti Fiorentini 1540–1640 (1985).

== Education and fellowships ==
Morrogh graduated from Oxford in classics. His doctor's degree in the history of art is from the Courtauld Institute in 1983. He held fellowships at Harvard's Villa I Tatti (The Harvard University Center for Italian Renaissance Studies in Florence, Italy), the Center for Advanced Study in the Visual Arts at the National Gallery of Art (1998–1999), and a postdoctoral fellowships at the New York University Institute of Fine Arts and at Princeton.

== Career ==
Morrogh is associate professor of Art History Emeritus, History of Art and Architecture, University of Oregon, Eugene, and belonged to the faculty at the Department of Art History of the University of Chicago from 1981 to 1990.

== Publications ==
- "The Early History of the Cappella De' Principi Florence." Doctoral thesis, Courtauld Institute, 1983.
- Renaissance Studies in Honor of Craig Hugh Smyth. Florence: Giunti Barbera, 1985. ISBN 9788809058705
- Disegni di Architetti Fiorentini 1540–1640. Florence: Leo S. Olschki, 1 January 1985. ISBN 8822233530
- "The Medici Chapel: The Designs for the Central Tomb.” Studies in the History of Art, vol. 33 (1992): pp. 142–161. JSTOR
- “The Chapel of the Beato Amedeo at Vercelli: Valperga, Guarini, Garove (1680–82).” Mitteilungen Des Kunsthistorischen Institutes in Florenz, vol. 43, no. 1, (1999): pp. 80–102. JSTOR
- “The Gritti Monuments in San Francesco Della Vigna, Venice: The Case for Palladio's Authorship.” Journal of the Society of Architectural Historians, vol. 69, no. 2 (June 2010): pp. 206–233. JSTOR
- "Guarini and the Pursuit of Originality: The Church for Lisbon and Related Projects.” Journal of the Society of Architectural Historians, vol. 57, no. 1 (March 1998): pp. 6–29. JSTOR
- "The Magnifici Tomb: A Key Project in Michelangelo's Architectural Career.” The Art Bulletin, vol. 74, no. 4, (December 1992): pp. 567–598. JSTOR
- "The Palace of the Roman People: Michelangelo at the Palazzo dei Conservatori." Tübingen: Ernst Wasmuth Verlag, 1994

=== Contributor ===
- Studies in the History of Art, vol. 33 (1992): pp. 285–287. JSTOR

== Other information ==
Photographs contributed by Andrew Morrogh to the Conway Library are currently being digitised by the Courtauld Institute of Art, as part of the Courtauld Connects project
