= Medici Chapel =

Medici Chapel most often refers to the Sagrestia Nuova or New Sacristy in San Lorenzo, Florence, a burial chapel with sculpture and architecture by Michelangelo.

It may also refer to:

- Medici Chapels, a complex of two chapels at San Lorenzo (the Sagrestia Nuova and the Cappella dei Principi) operated as a museum
  - Cappella dei Principi, a 17th-century mausoleum containing the tombs of five grand dukes of Tuscany
- Magi Chapel, the chapel of the Palazzo Medici Riccardi, Florence
- Sagrestia Vecchia, a sacristy in San Lorenzo with tombs of members of the Medici family
- Medici Chapel, Santa Croce, Florence
- Chapel of Medici di Gragnano at Santi Severino e Sossio, Naples
