= Old Synagogue of Livorno =

Destroyed synagogue in Livorno, Italy

- Italian: Tempio Maggiore di Livorno
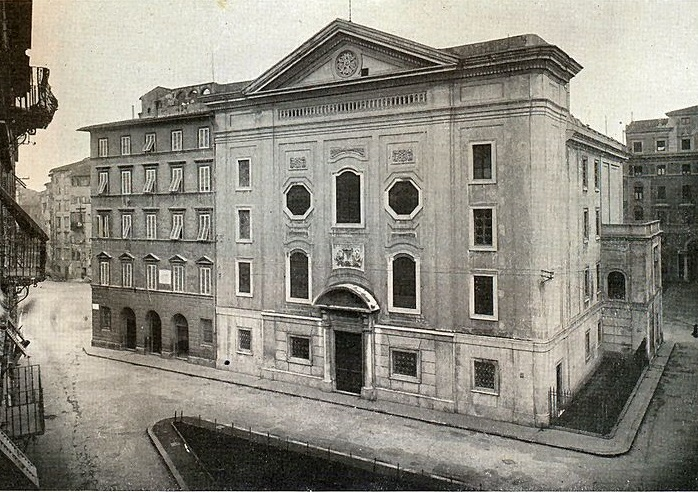
- The old synagogue, prior to 1944

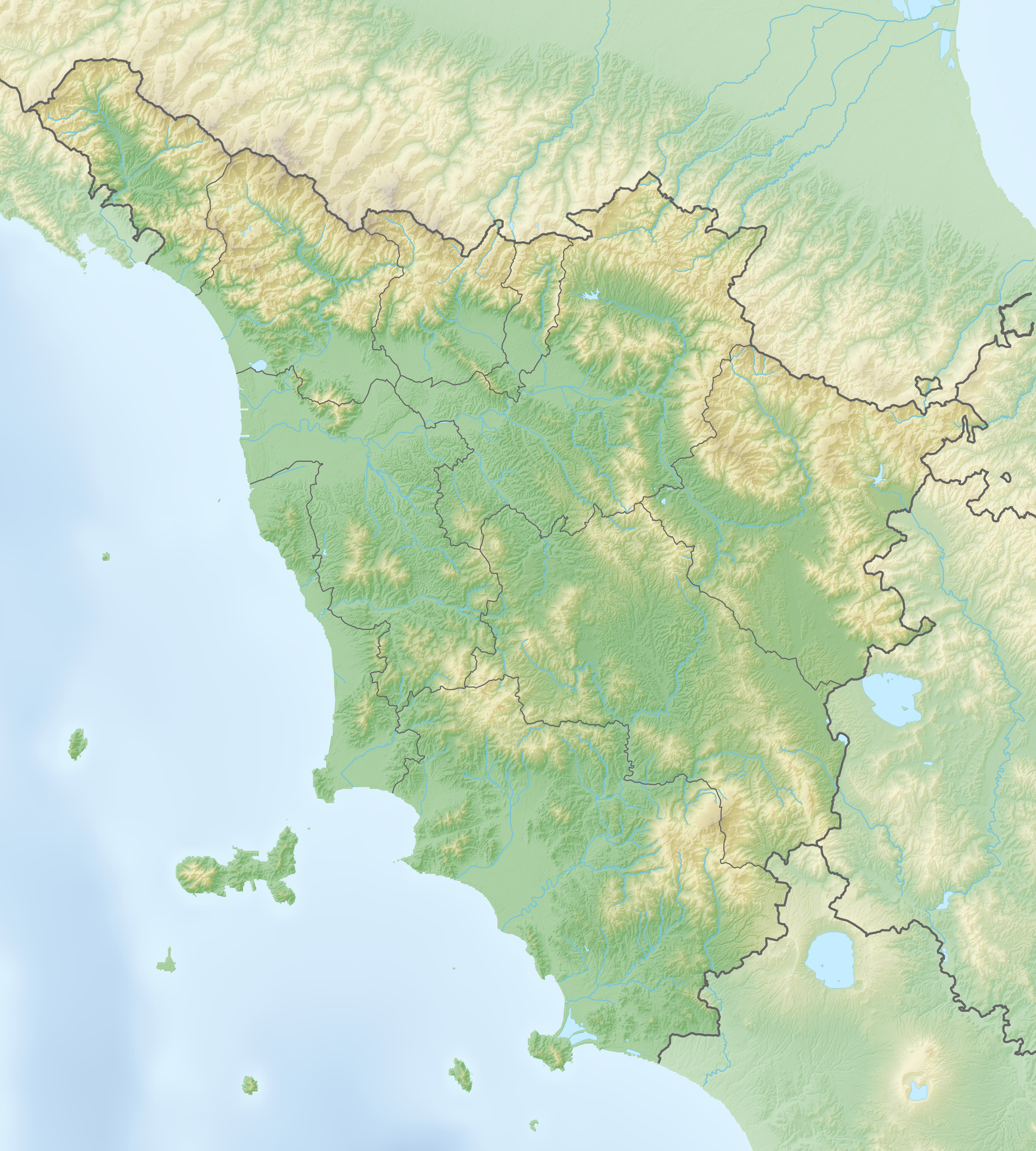
- Location of the destroyed synagogue in Tuscany

Religion
- Affiliation: Judaism (former)
- Rite: Spanish rite
- Ecclesiastical or organizational status: Synagogue (1603–1944)
- Status: Destroyed

Location
- Location: Piazza Benamozegh 1, Livorno, Tuscany
- Country: Italy
- Interactive map of Old Synagogue of Livorno
- Coordinates: 43°32′56″N 10°18′33″E

Architecture
- Architects: Claudio Cogorano; Alessandro Pieroni
- Type: Synagogue architecture
- Established: 1603 (as a congregation)
- Completed: 1603; 1789 (renovations)
- Destroyed: 1944

Specifications
- Length: 28 metres (92 ft)
- Width: 26 metres (85 ft)

The Old Synagogue of Livorno, or Great Synagogue of Livorno (Italian: Tempio Maggiore di Livorno), was a Jewish congregation and synagogue, that was located at Piazza Benamozegh 1, in Livorno, in Tuscany, Italy. The synagogue was completed in 1603 and was devastated during World War II by Nazis in 1944.

The New Synagogue of Livorno was completed in 1962 to replace the former ancient synagogue.

== History ==
The first synagogue of Livorno dates from 1603. The synagogue was built in a modest and simple style by Claudio Cogorano and Alessandro Pieroni. In the following years the synagogue was enlarged to accommodate an increase of Livorno's Jewish population to approximately 3,000 people. The project to build a larger worship hall and to add galleries was undertaken by Francesco Cantagallina in 1642. The Torah ark was built with inlaid colored marble by Isidoro Baratta from Carrara, surmounted by a silver crown with a topaz set on it. The bimah was built with the same technique, and the ceiling was enriched with stuccoes, decorations and gilt.

The temple underwent structural renovation by Ignazio Fazzi following an earthquake in 1742. In addition, a second row of gallery was built for women. After the work was completed, the temple hall was the second largest after that of the Synagogue of Amsterdam, measuring 28 metres (92 ft) long by 26 metres (85 ft) wide. On September 20, 1789, the first evening of Rosh Hashanah 5550 according to the Hebrew calendar, the newly renovated synagogue was inaugurated. In the 19th century the synagogue was further expanded, and a new southern façade was built.

The synagogue was partially destroyed during World War II.

== Gallery ==
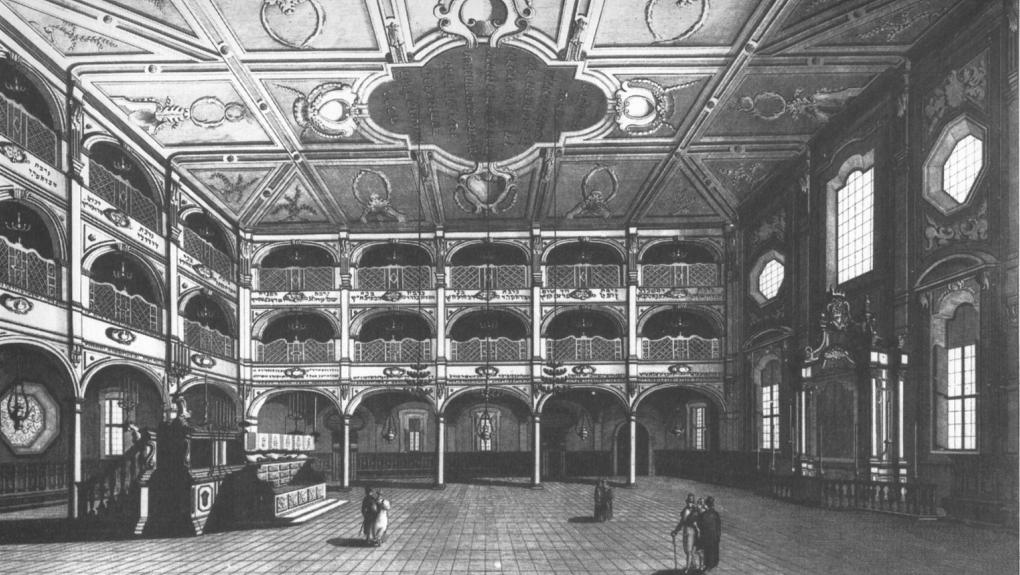
Interior of the old Old Synagogue of Livorno (Tempio Maggiore) in the 19th century

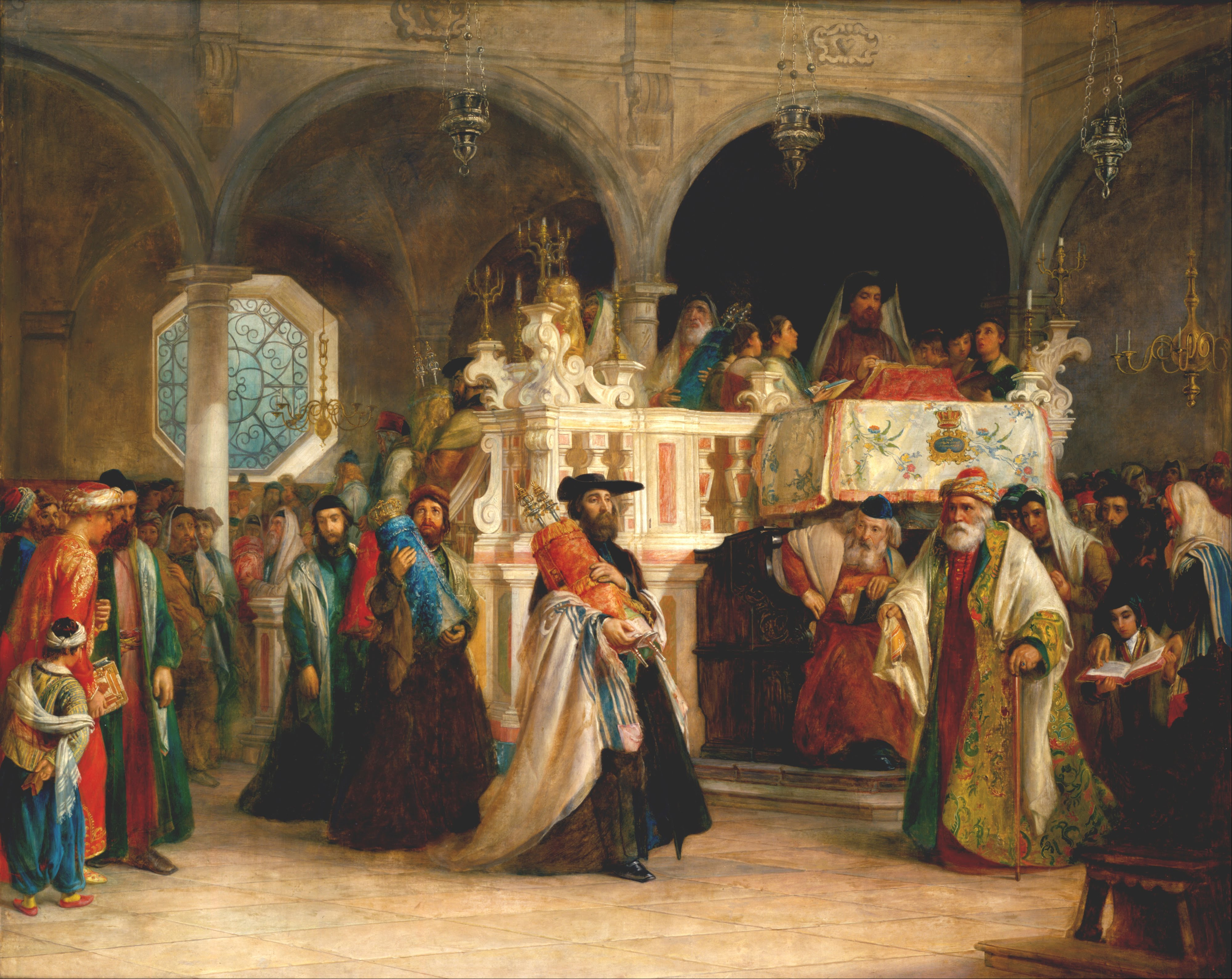
Simchat Torah at the Synagogue of Livorno (Solomon Alexander Hart, c. 1850)

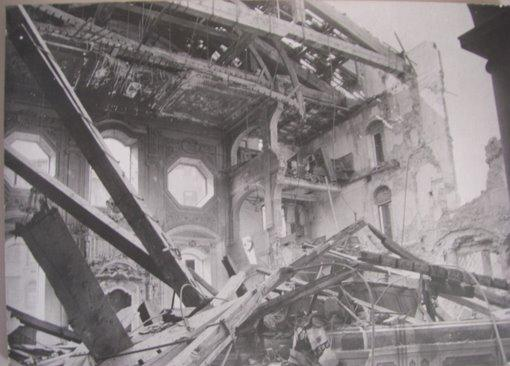
View of the Old Synagogue after the bombings

== See also ==
- History of the Jews in Livorno
- History of the Jews in Italy
- List of synagogues in Italy
- New Synagogue of Livorno
