= Soderini =

Coat of arms of the Soderini family

The Soderini family is an ancient Italian noble family of Florence patricians.

== History ==
The family can trace it's noble lineage back to the 12th century. Members of the family distinguished themselves as statesman, diplomats and religious leaders. Many of them held the Florentine posts of Priori and Gonfaloniere.

== Notable members ==
  - Piero Soderini (1450 – 1522) Florentine statesman
  - Francesco Soderini (1453–1524) Florentine diplomat and religious leader
  - Paolo Antonio Soderini (1448 — after 1500) Florentine jurist
  - Giovan Vettorio Soderini (1526–1596) Italian agronomist
  - Eleonora degli Albizzi (1543-1634) mistress of Grand Duke Cosimo I de' Medici born to Soderini mother
  - Camilla Martelli (1545-1590) mistress of Grand Duke Cosimo I de' Medici born to Soderini mother. The latter married the Grand Duke

== See also ==
- Soderini letter, document describing a disputed early voyage by Amerigo Vespucci
