= Medici Chapels =

Structures at San Lorenzo, Florence, Italy

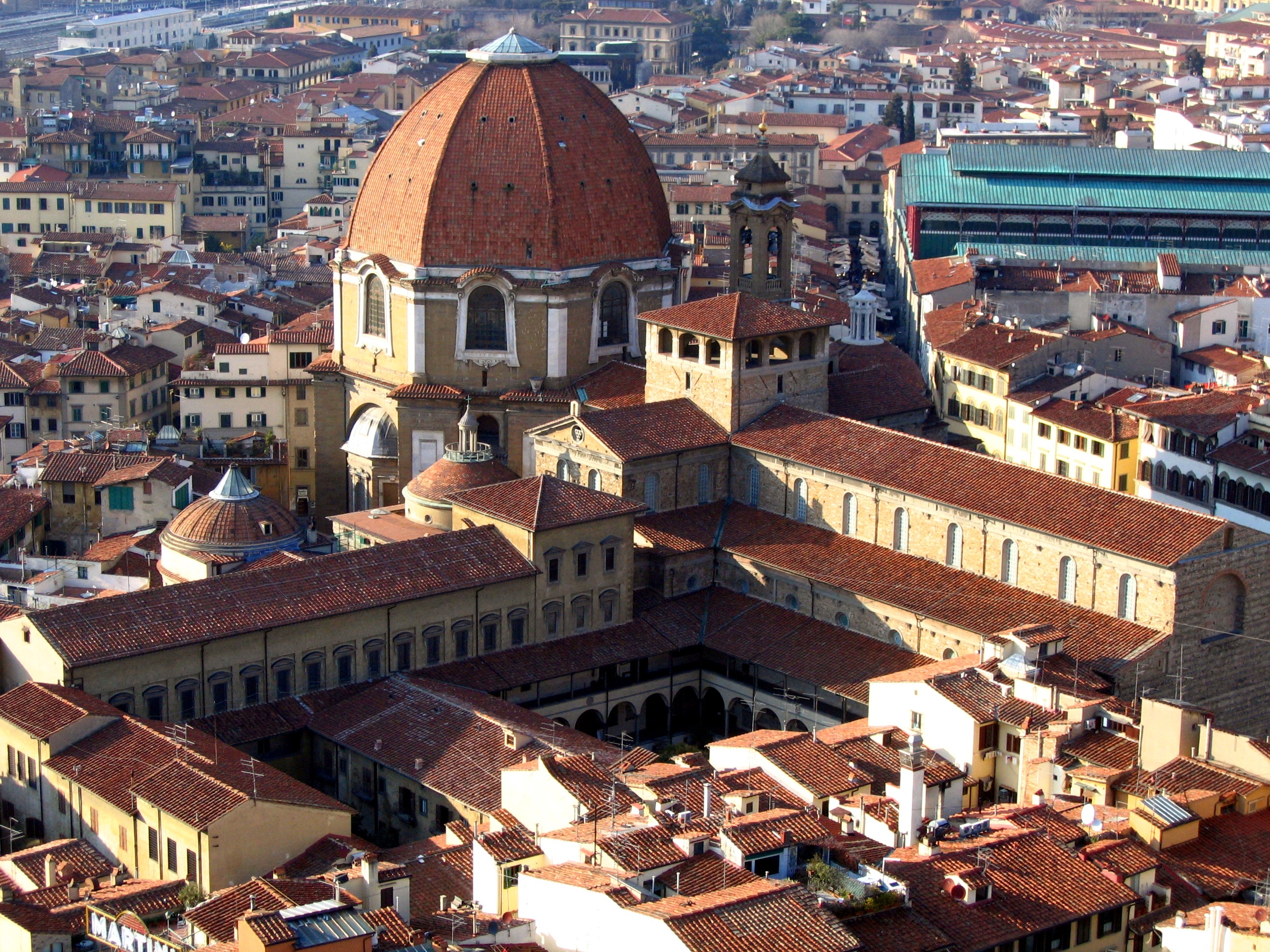
- The dome of the Cappella dei Principi dominates the San Lorenzo architectural complex
- Location: Piazza Madonna degli Aldobrandini, Florence, Italy
- Coordinates: 43°46′30″N 11°15′12″E
- Visitors: 321,043
- Director: Monica Bietti

The Medici Chapels (Italian: Cappelle medicee) are two chapels built between the 16th and 17th centuries as an extension to the Basilica of San Lorenzo, in the Italian city of Florence. They are the Sagrestia Nuova ('New Sacristy'), designed by Michelangelo, and the larger Cappella dei Principi ('Chapel of the Princes'), a collaboration between the Medici family and architects. The purpose of the chapels was to celebrate the Medici family, patrons of the church and Grand Dukes of Tuscany.

These are not to be confused with the Magi Chapel in the Palazzo Medici Riccardi, then the main Medici home, that houses a famous cycle of frescoes by Benozzo Gozzoli, painted around 1459.

== Sagrestia Nuova ==
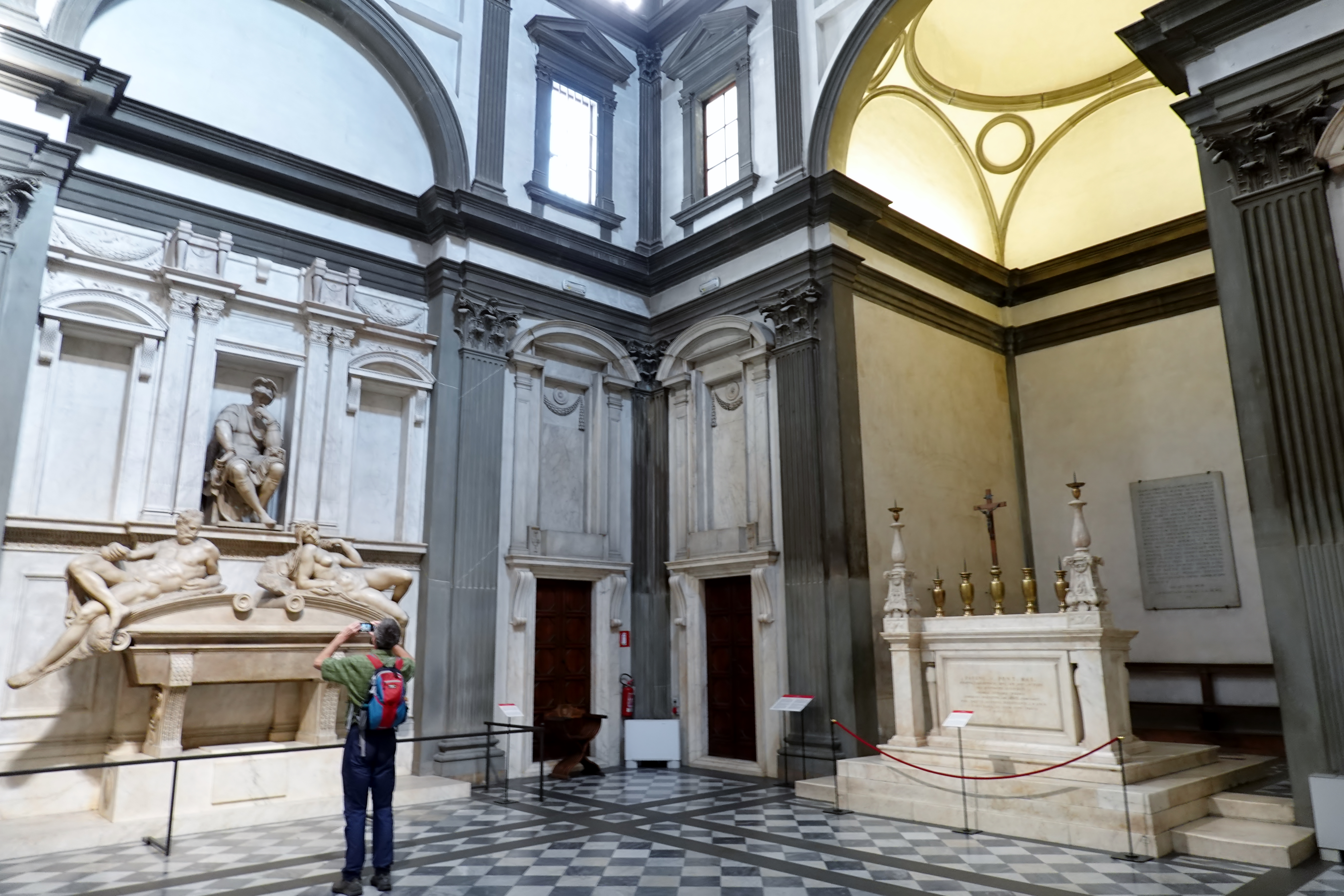
The Sagrestia Nuova; on the left is the tomb of Lorenzo de' Medici, Duke of Urbino; on the right, the altar

The Sagrestia Nuova or New Sacristy, also known simply as the Medici Chapel, was intended by Cardinal Giulio de' Medici and his cousin Pope Leo X as a mausoleum or mortuary chapel for members of the Medici family. It balances Filippo Brunelleschi's Sagrestia Vecchia, the 'Old Sacristy' nestled beside the left transept of San Lorenzo, with which it consciously competes, and shares its format of a cubical space surmounted by a dome, of gray pietra serena and whitewashed walls. It was the first essay in architecture (1519–1524) of Michelangelo, who also designed its monuments that are dedicated to certain members of the Medici family, with sculptural personifications of the four times of day that were destined to influence sculptural figures reclining on architraves for many generations to come. The Sagrestia Nuova was entered via a discreet entrance in a corner of San Lorenzo's right transept, now closed.

Although it was vaulted over by 1524, the ambitious projects of its sculpture and the intervention of events, such as the temporary exile of the Medici (1527), the death of Giulio, eventually Pope Clement VII, and the permanent departure of Michelangelo for Rome in 1534, meant that Michelangelo never finished it.

The Madonna and Child was the first sculpture Michelangelo completed for the project, and although most of the following statues had been carved by the time of Michelangelo's departure, they had not been put in place, being left in disarray across the chapel. Later, in 1545, they were installed by Niccolò Tribolo. By order of Cosimo I, Giorgio Vasari and Bartolomeo Ammannati finished the work by 1555.

Four Medici tombs were intended for the project, but those of Lorenzo the Magnificent and his brother Giuliano (buried beneath the altar at the entrance wall) were never begun. The magnificent existing tombs are those of two more recently deceased and less well-known family members whose careers had been cut tragically short by their comparatively early deaths: Giuliano di Lorenzo, Duke of Nemours (d. 1514, aged 37) and his nephew (d. 1519, age 27) Lorenzo di Piero, Duke of Urbino, whose daughter Catherine de' Medici became Queen of France). The architectural components of these tombs are similar and with sculptures offering contrast.

In 1976, a concealed corridor with drawings by Michelangelo on its walls was discovered under the New Sacristy.

== Cappella dei Principi ==
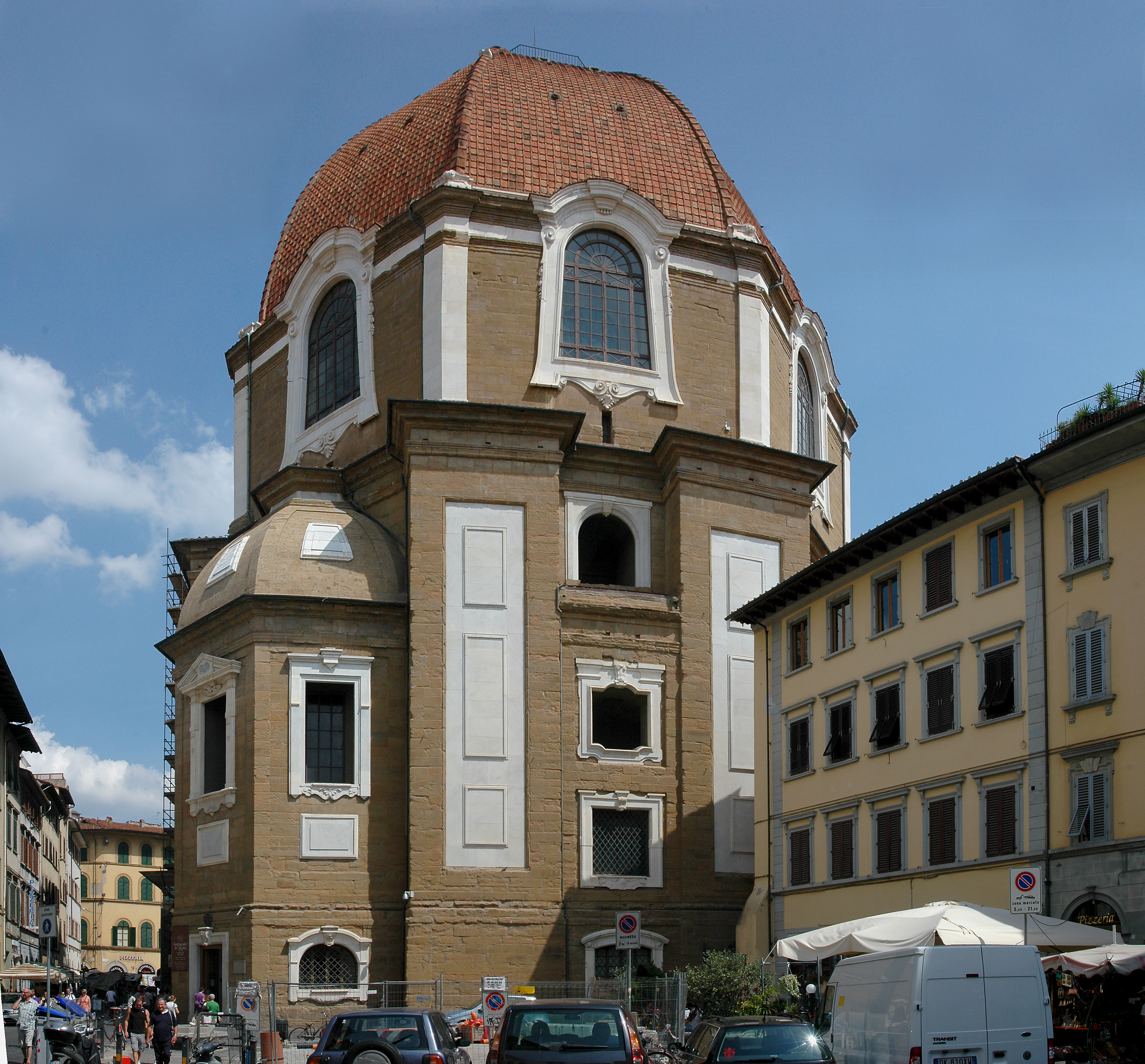
Exterior

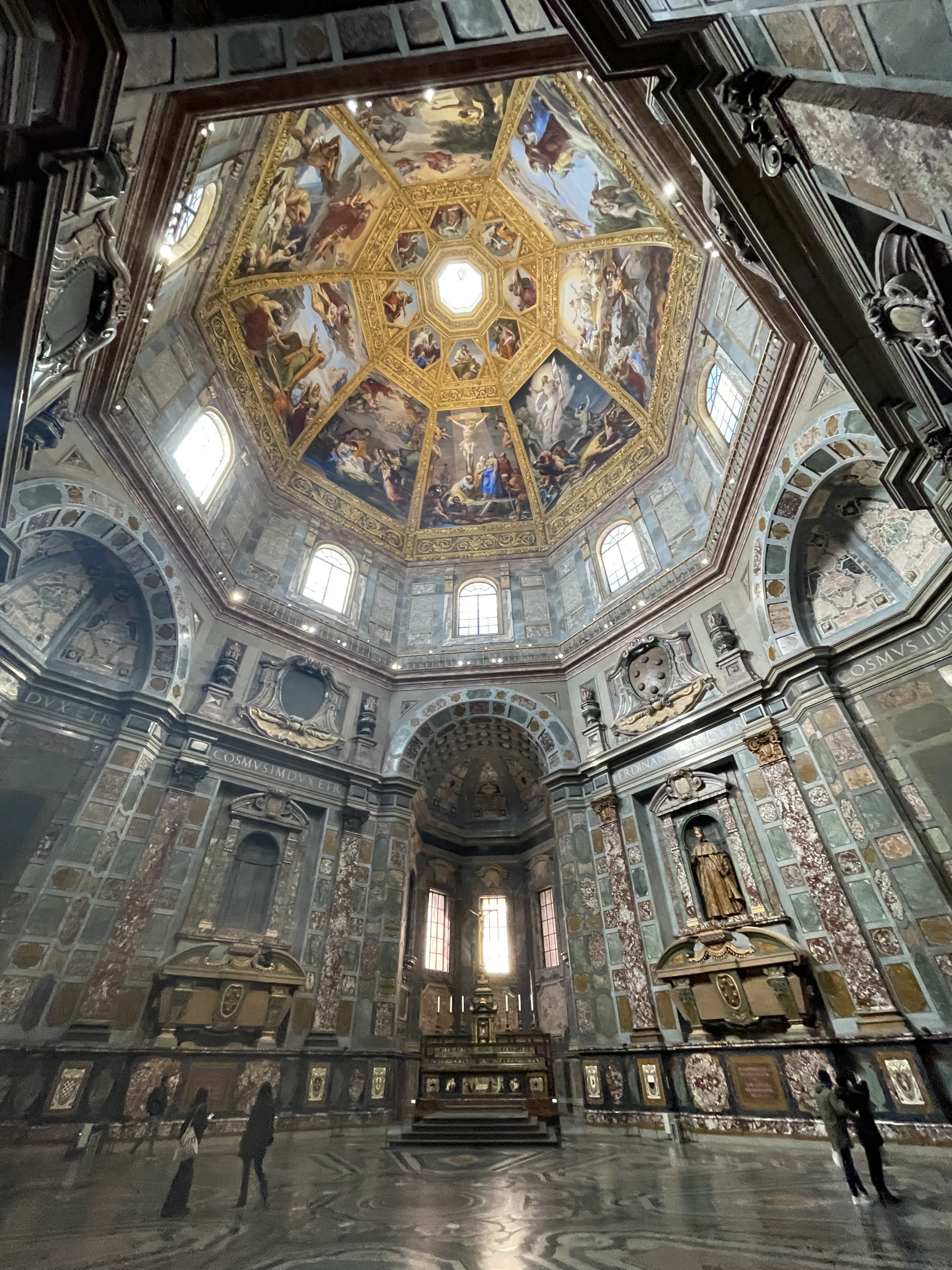
Interior

The octagonal Cappella dei Principi, surmounted by a tall dome 59 metres high, is the distinguishing feature of San Lorenzo when seen from a distance. It is on the same axis as the nave and chancel to which it provides the equivalent of an apsidal chapel. Its entrance is from the exterior, in Piazza Madonna degli Aldobrandini, and through the low vaulted crypt planned by Bernardo Buontalenti before plans for the chapel above were made.

The opulent Cappella dei Principi, an idea formulated by Cosimo I de' Medici, was put into effect by Ferdinand I. It was designed by Matteo Nigetti, following some sketches tendered to an informal competition of 1602 by Don Giovanni de' Medici, the natural son of Cosimo I, which were altered in the execution by the aged Buontalenti. A true expression of court art, it was the result of collaboration among designers and patrons.

For the execution of its astonishing revetment of marbles inlaid with colored marbles and semi-precious stone, the Opificio delle Pietre Dure (the grand ducal hardstone workshop) was established. The art of commessi, as it was called in Florence, assembled jig-sawn fragments of specimen stones and porphyry to form the designs of the revetment that entirely cover the walls. The result was disapproved of by 18th- and 19th-century visitors, but has come to be appreciated as an example of the taste of its time. Six grand sarcophagi are empty; the Medici remains are interred in the crypt below. In sixteen compartments of the dado are coats of arms of Tuscan cities under Medici control. In the niches that were intended to hold portrait sculptures of the Medici, two were executed by Pietro Tacca (1626–1642) that feature Ferdinando I and Cosimo II.

== See also ==
- 16th-century Western domes
- 17th-century Western domes

== Bibliography ==
- Baldini, Umberto (1973). Michelangelo scultore (in Italian). Rizzoli.
- González, Marta Alvarez (2008). Michelangelo (in Italian) (Nuova ed.). Milano: Mondadori arte. ISBN 978-88-370-6434-1.
