= Matteo Nigetti =

Italian sculptor (ca. 1560/1570 – 1648)

Matteo Nigetti (ca. 1560/1570 – 1648) was an Italian architect and sculptor. He is an important Baroque architect in Florence.

== Biography ==
Born in Florence, he was the pupil and assistant of Bernardo Buontalenti, with whom he collaborated on the Palazzo Nonfinito (1593) (i.e. the unfinished palace, which now houses the National Museum of Anthropology and Ethnology in Florence).

Nigetti's masterwork is the Cappella dei Principi ("Princes' Chapel"), part of the church of San Lorenzo in Florence. It was commissioned by Grand Duke Ferdinand I, and Nigetti spent forty years of his life, from 1604 until his death, in its completion. He was assisted by Don Giovanni de' Medici, Ferdinand's half-brother, and Alessandro Pieroni.

In parallel, Nigetti was one of the main architects, along with Gherardo Silvani, who produced the church of San Gaetano, Florence, developing an original design by Buontalenti. Nigetti also designed the original façade of the Ognissanti church. His brother Giovanni, also an architect, often collaborated with him.
