= History of the Jews in Livorno =

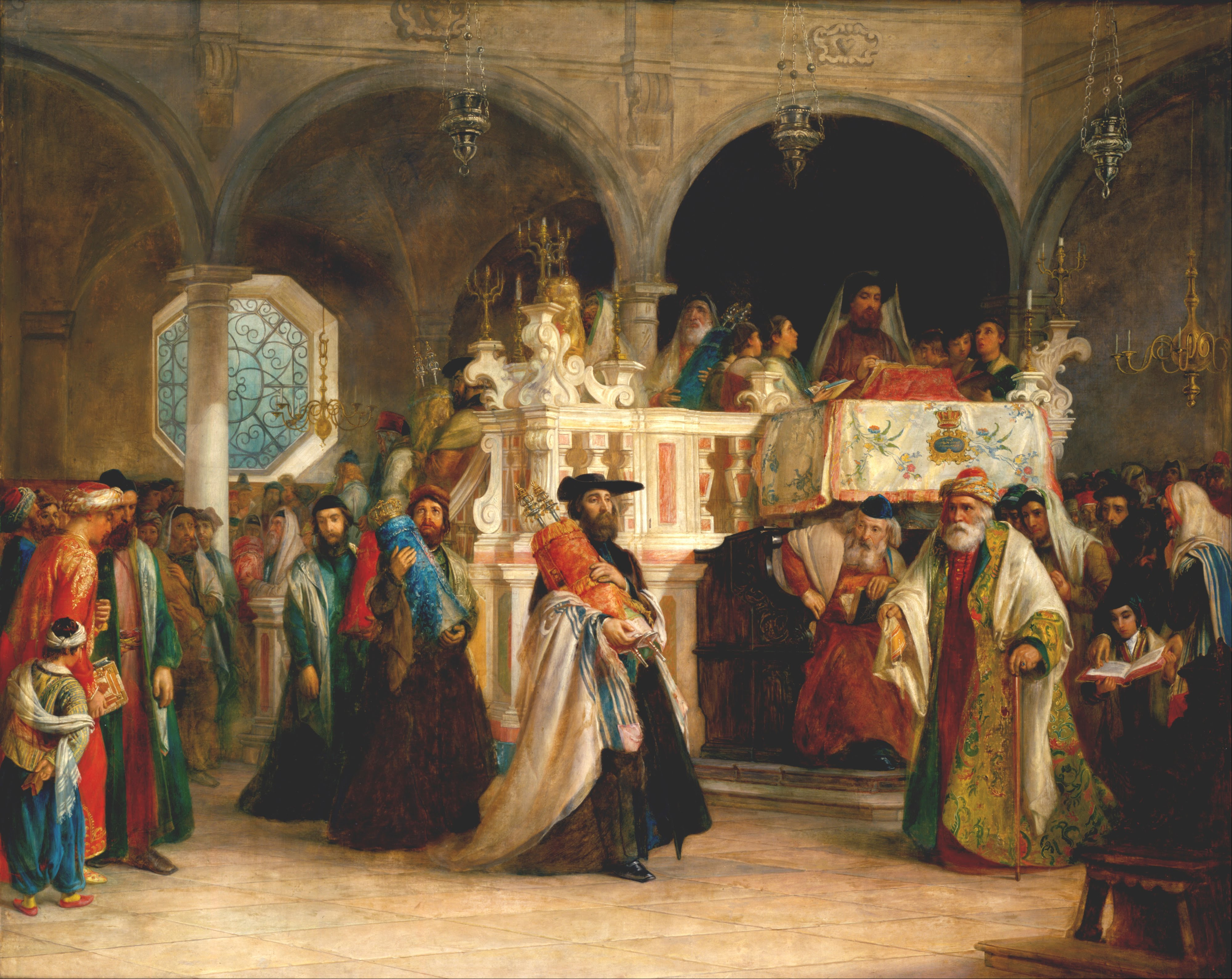
The Feast of the Rejoicing of the Law at the Synagogue in Leghorn, Italy (1850), by Solomon Alexander Hart.

The history of the Jews in Livorno (English: Leghorn; Ladino: Liorne or Liorna), Italy, has been documented since 1583, when descendants of the late 15th-century and early 16th-century expulsions from Spain and Portugal settled in the city. They were settled initially by Sephardic Jews from Pisa. The Jewish community of Livorno, although the youngest among the historic Jewish communities of Italy, was for some time the foremost: its members achieved political rights and wealth, and contributed to scholarship in the thriving port city. Numerous Jewish schools and welfare institutions were established.

Livorno traded with northern Europe and the Levant but declined in the later 19th century after losing its status as a free port. From a peak estimated population of 10,000 Sephardic Jews during that period, by 1904 a total of 3,000 Jews remained in Livorno, many having emigrated to other cities and nations where they were known as Grana (قرانة) in Judeo-Arabic or Gorneyim (גורנים) in Hebrew – both derived from a demonym for 'Livornese'.

== History ==
The first traces of a Jewish settlement are found in documents from about 1583. The Medici family, working to promote the growth of the city, its trade, the port, recruited many new settlers from Greece and the Ottoman Empire. Portuguese and Spanish Marranos also found a refuge there in 1590. In 1591, and again in 1593, Ferdinando I de' Medici, Grand Duke of Tuscany issued a charter to assure all foreigners desiring to settle at Livorno, including Jews, of the most extensive rights and privileges. Many Jews were attracted by this promise. The Jewish community of Pisa received the privilege of founding a branch at Livorno with a synagogue and cemetery. In 1597, the Jews of Livorno received autonomous rights as a community, and they built a synagogue in 1603.

== Rights and privileges ==
The Jewish community was authorized to have complete jurisdiction in civil cases involving Jews and in some minor criminal cases. In 1593 the duke's administration appointed a special judge to the Jewish court; his sentencing could be appealed only with the permission of the grand duke. As controversies arose regarding the extent of the jurisdiction, the grand duke decreed that severe penalties, such as sentences of death and penal servitude, should be confirmed by the public court. The Livornese community had the right of succession in all Jewish cases where the deceased died without natural or legal heirs.

When the Jewish community was established (in 1593), the directors were empowered to grant safe-conducts and immunity as regards previous crimes and debts to all Jews who settled at Livorno. The communal directors decided on accepting new settlers by a majority vote of two-thirds. The right of immunity in the case of previous crimes was soon abrogated by the grand duke.

When Tuscany was incorporated into the French empire in 1808, the French established their law and abolished the Jewish court, also abrogating the community's right of succession. The Jewish court was revived in 1814, but with limited jurisdiction, confined to questions relating to marital law. In 1822 such cases were also assigned to the municipal courts; the directors of the Jewish community retained the privilege of giving advisory opinions. Since 1866 and the unification of Italy, the Codice Civile and civil marriage have applied to all residents of Livorno as throughout the kingdom of Italy.

In 1786, the Grand Duke of Tuscany's administration limited the immunity from debt of Jews to only those debts that had been incurred more than four months previously. This rule continued to 1836. The right of naturalization, however, remained in force until 1859, when the Jews received full citizenship in the unified Italy.

== Taxes ==
From the beginning, the Jewish community had the right to impose taxes for the purpose of defraying its expenses. This right was confirmed in 1715, 1782, and 1814. In 1829 it was amplified. The community established the following taxes:

- Ẓorke ẓibbur, 1/2% of their income, payable by all Jews living at Livorno, or engaged in trade or commerce there, and having a yearly income of more than 1,500 lire.
- Diritto nazionale, a duty on all goods imported or exported by Jews through the port of Livorno, at the rate of 1/8% for resident and 1/4% for non-resident Jews. Merchants were required to keep a special column in their books for this tax.
- Beginning with 1767, a special tax upon private synagogues, in order to prevent their multiplication.
- Special tax on meat slaughtered according to the Jewish ritual (kosher).

Later the community gradually abolished these separate taxes, and raised funds by a single tax, sussidio obbligatorio, to cover all the needs of the community.

== Constitution of 1780 ==
When the municipality was reorganized in 1780, Jewish house-owners were declared eligible to positions on the municipal general council, though they were excluded from the magistracy. Jews were not popularly elected to the council, but one representative was chosen on their behalf by the Grand Duke, from a number of names suggested by the community. The Jewish deputy took part in the municipal government as representative of the interests of Livornese Jewry, with the same privileges and salary as the Christian magistrates. The municipal constitution of 1808 under the French abrogated this privilege; but it was renewed in 1816. It remained in force to 1858; after unification, Jews became eligible for all municipal offices.

== Organization ==
The community in 1593 established a council of five members, designated capi or massari della sinagoga, to administer affairs. They had to be prominent, well-to-do merchants; they were elected for one year, and could not immediately be re-elected. Due to irregularities during an election, the Grand Duke decreed in 1637 that the massari should be designated by lot by the community of Pisa. In 1642, due to repeated irregularities, new methods were adopted. Five massari were appointed from a council of fifty persons who had been chosen from among all merchants and house-owners over twenty-five years of age. In 1667 the community established a council of twelve deputies, who were elected for life, in addition to the massari. There was in addition a council of forty "able and capable citizens" in three commissions, from whom the massari were chosen. In 1693 a great council of sixty members, having all the rights of a modern parliament, was introduced; of this council twenty members sat in rotation each year, the entire body being convened only on important occasions. By this constitution (i.e. the constitution of 1693), the administrative corporation was divided into two bodies, one legislative and the other executive. It remained in force only a short time.

In 1715 the Grand Duke appointed three members of the great council as 'censors' for a term of two years. They were empowered to examine the books of the community and to supervise its expenses. On the extinction of the House of Medici, the Duke of Lorraine confirmed the constitution, with slight modifications. It was confirmed again in 1803 under the short-lived kingdom of Etruria. During this period, the Jewish community lived by the principle that all male members were obliged to accept communal offices. The Grand Duke appointed and paid the salary of a chancellor to aid Jewish administration.

== History since 1808 ==
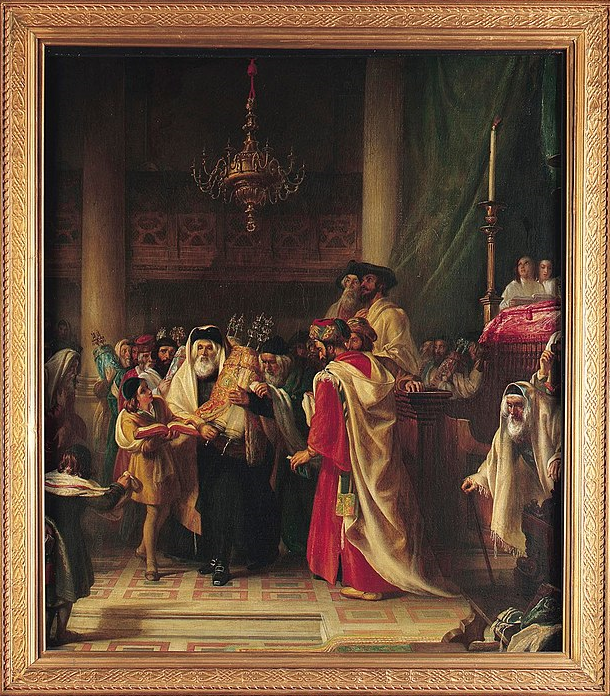
Solomon Alexander Hart, Procession of the Law at the Synagogue (1845)

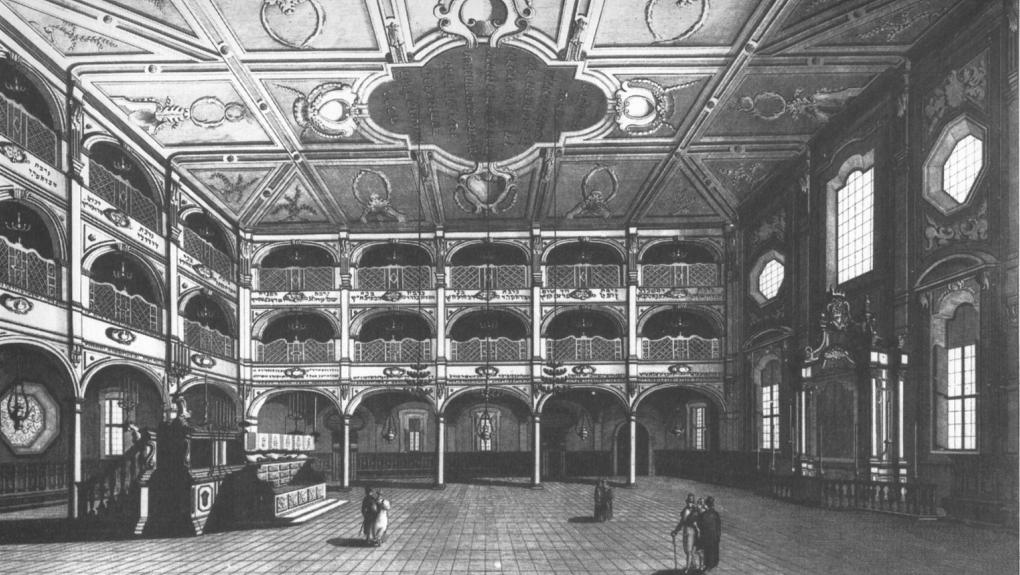
Interior of the old Synagogue of Livorno (Tempio Maggiore) in the 19th century

When the French imposed rule in 1808, the privileges as well as the constitution of the Jewish community were temporarily abrogated. Livorno had received the consistorial constitution drafted by the Grand Sanhedrin of Paris in 1806, and was made the seat of a consistory for the Mediterranean district. The community appointed two rabbis and three laymen as members of this consistory on September 6, 1810.

In 1814, following the end of French rule, the Grand Duke allowed the old constitution to be revived; he appointed three massari for a period of three years and a council of forty for life. In 1861, on the establishment of the kingdom of Italy, the old constitution was entirely abrogated. During the following interregnum, the community was governed by three members. In 1881 the community was finally reorganized, with new statutes in conformity with the principles obtaining in most Italian communities.

In 1915 Italian Jewish writer Guido Bedarida would move to the city and later become one of the most important sources on its unique dialect of Judeo-Italian known as Bagitto.

The Jews of Livorno suffered no persecutions, nor were any restrictions imposed upon them, during the entire time of their residence in the city up till the Fascist period starting in the 1930s. They contributed strongly to the development of commerce and industry as Livorno grew from a small fishing-village into a rich and powerful commercial center. Together with Greeks and Armenians, the Jews dominated part of the commerce. A traveler of the seventeenth century says that the Christians had to keep holiday on the Sabbath on the Jews' account. The community, which consisted mainly of descendants of Spanish and Portuguese immigrants, retained its ancient traditions. Down to the nineteenth century, communal business was transacted partly in Portuguese; the Spanish ritual (Sephardic) was observed in the synagogue; important hafṭarot were translated into Portuguese or Ladino; and sermons were delivered in that language. The Jews preserved also the gentility and self-confidence characteristic of them in their Iberian homes. In 1603 they built a synagogue, which was one of the finest architectural monuments of the city.

The community also took interest in the general welfare; they ransomed prisoners who were landed at Livorno. The members provided charity to less fortunate Jews in other countries. In 1648 they levied a special tax for the benefit of the Polish Jews. They joined the Alliance Israélite Universelle. At various periods the Jewish community of Livorno numbered 10,000 persons; as late as 1848 it was estimated to number 7,000. As the commerce of the city declined, many emigrated to other cities and nations. By 1904 about 3,000 Jews remained in the city. The community, formerly so wealthy, had become very impoverished after the city lost its status as a free port.

Livorno suffered extensive damage during the Second World War, including severe bomb damage to the synagogue. At least 90 Jews from Livorno were sent to concentration camps, and others were killed in nearby mountains, where there was a significant German army presence. The synagogue was demolished and replaced by a new building in a modern style commissioned in 1958. It opened in 1962.

== Relations with other Sephardim ==
The rabbinate of Livorno was widely known for its scholarship, as it attracted new learned members from the East, and had connections with the Sephardim of Amsterdam and London. Many merchants also devoted themselves to study, taking up medicine, astronomy, philosophy, and the classics. Through its connection with the East, Livorno was always a center for cabalists, especially at the time of the Shabbethaian controversies. In the 19th century, cabalists and mystics still found support in the city.

The Livorno community served as a link between the Spanish and Portuguese Jews and the Eastern Sephardi and Mizrahi communities of the Arab Mediterranean nations. It was a clearing house of traditions between the two groups. For example, its musical and cantorial tradition, though related to those of other Spanish and Portuguese communities, was influenced by Jewish communities all around the Mediterranean, to whom in turn the Livorno tradition was exported. Many merchants maintained a presence in both Livorno and North African countries such as Tunisia. Those who settled permanently in the Ottoman Empire retained their Tuscan or Italian nationality, so as to have the benefit of the Ottoman Capitulations. In Tunisia there was a community of Juifs Portugais, or L'Grana (Livornese), separate from, and regarding itself as superior to, the native Tunisian Jews (Tuansa). Smaller Jewish communities of the same kind (not exclusively Livornese) existed in other countries, such as Syria, where they were known as Señores Francos. They generally were not numerous enough to establish their own synagogues, instead meeting for prayer in each other's houses.

Many Jews also emigrated to Algeria, Egypt, France and Libya in order to capitalise on their nations' foreign investment. In some cases, such as the Mendoza and the Mosseri family, whole families moved, thus contributing to development of Jewish communities in primarily Islamic states.

== Foundations ==
Among the many philanthropic foundations the schools, which were once widely famed, were especially noteworthy. There were numerous chapels in addition to the large synagogue (two being named after the rabbis Ergas and Azulai). Jewish institutions included the following:

1. Beneficenza Israelitica, organized in 1683, supported by a special tax, and intended for the relief of the communal poor as well as for the ransoming of prisoners. Its operations were later limited to aiding the indigent. The trustees were at the same time trustees of the communal schools, Pie Scuole Israelitiche di Livorno, which, richly endowed, were the pride of the community. As early as the beginning of the 19th century, there were two Jewish schools, an elementary school with three grades and a higher school with six grades; together they were endowed with a fund of 86,000 florins. The schools subsequently received bequests from the Franchetti family. Around 1900 they included a kindergarten ("asili infantili"), an elementary school for boys and girls, a drawing-school for boys learning a trade, and a trade-school for girls. Instruction was given both in secular and in religious subjects. Connected with these schools was a rabbinical seminary ("istituto rabbinico"), which taught advanced Hebrew, rabbinical science, and theology, in addition to the regular college course. These were among the wealthiest Jewish educational institutions of the period, enjoying such bequests as a large legacy by Samuele del Mare (1885) and a foundation for distributing prizes for scientific works.
2. Spedale Israelitico, founded in 1826 by Solomon Abudarham, and enriched by bequests from his relatives and from the Franchetti family (building opened in 1863).
3. Moar Abetulot ("maritare donzelle"), founded in 1644 by prominent Spanish families for providing brides with dowries, and affording relief to impoverished members. The membership and government of this institution were hereditary. As a family foundation, it preserved the genealogies of all its members.
4. Malbisc Harumim, Vestire Poveri, instituted in 1654 for clothing the poor, especially the teachers and pupils of the Jewish schools.
5. Opera Pia Franco, founded by Joseph Franco in 1772 for the promotion of rabbinical studies, giving dowries to poor brides, and the support of Jews in Palestine.

All these foundations were obliged to change their statutes and government in conformity with the Italian law for the administration of philanthropic institutions.

Between 1650 and 1657, a Hebrew printing-press was established at Livorno. In 1703 another was established. They printed many prayer-books which were distributed to the East, in addition to many cabalistic works.

== Cuisine ==
Livornese cuisine was significantly shaped by its Jewish community of Sephardic and converso merchants, who introduced New World foods such as tomatoes, pumpkin, maize, and haricot beans through their extensive trade networks. The Portuguese conversos, who formed the majority of the Jewish community in Livorno, also brought with them a rich culinary heritage, including dishes like triglie alla mosaica (red mullet with tomatoes), pumpkin-based recipes, and sweets such as uova filate (threads of egg yolk cooked in syrup), Monte Sinai, bocca di ciama (flourless almond cake), scodellini, and chocolate cakes. The latter was influenced by their connections with the converso community in Amsterdam. That community pioneered the chocolate industry using cocoa supplied by New Christians from South America.

== Jewish Encyclopedia bibliography ==
- Antologia Israelitica, i., ii., Livorno, 1901;
- G. B. Depping, Die Juden im Mittelalter, pp. 372–373;
- I. Rignano, La Università Israelitica di Livorno e le Opere Pie da Essa Amministrate, ib. 1890;
- Vivoli, Annali di Livorno, iii., iv.
- For the schools: Allgemeene Vaterlandsche Letter, pp. 353 et seq., Oefeningen, 1805;
- Sulamith, ii. 1, 145 et seq.;
- Zunz, G. S. i. 94;
- comp. Corriere Israelitico, xi. 141.
- On the printing-press: Steinschneider, Jüdische Typographie, pp. 62–63.
- For the rabbis: Mortara, Indice. Also such articles in the Encyclopaedia Judaica as Ergas, Joseph ben Emanuel, and Malachi ben Jacob Na-Kohen.

== Other references ==
- Seroussi, Edwin: "Livorno: A Crossroads in the History of Sephardic Religious Music", from Horowitz and Orfali (ed.), The Mediterranean and the Jews: Society, Culture and Economy in Early Modern Times

== See also ==
- History of the Jews in Calabria
- History of the Jews in Naples
- History of the Jews in Sicily
- History of the Jews in Trieste
- History of the Jews in Turin
- History of the Jews in Venice

=== Other ===
- History of the Jews in Italy
- History of the Jews in the Roman Empire
- Spanish and Portuguese Jews
- Synagogue of Livorno
- Bakri-Busnach affair
