= Alessandro Pieroni =

Italian architect and painter (1550–1607)

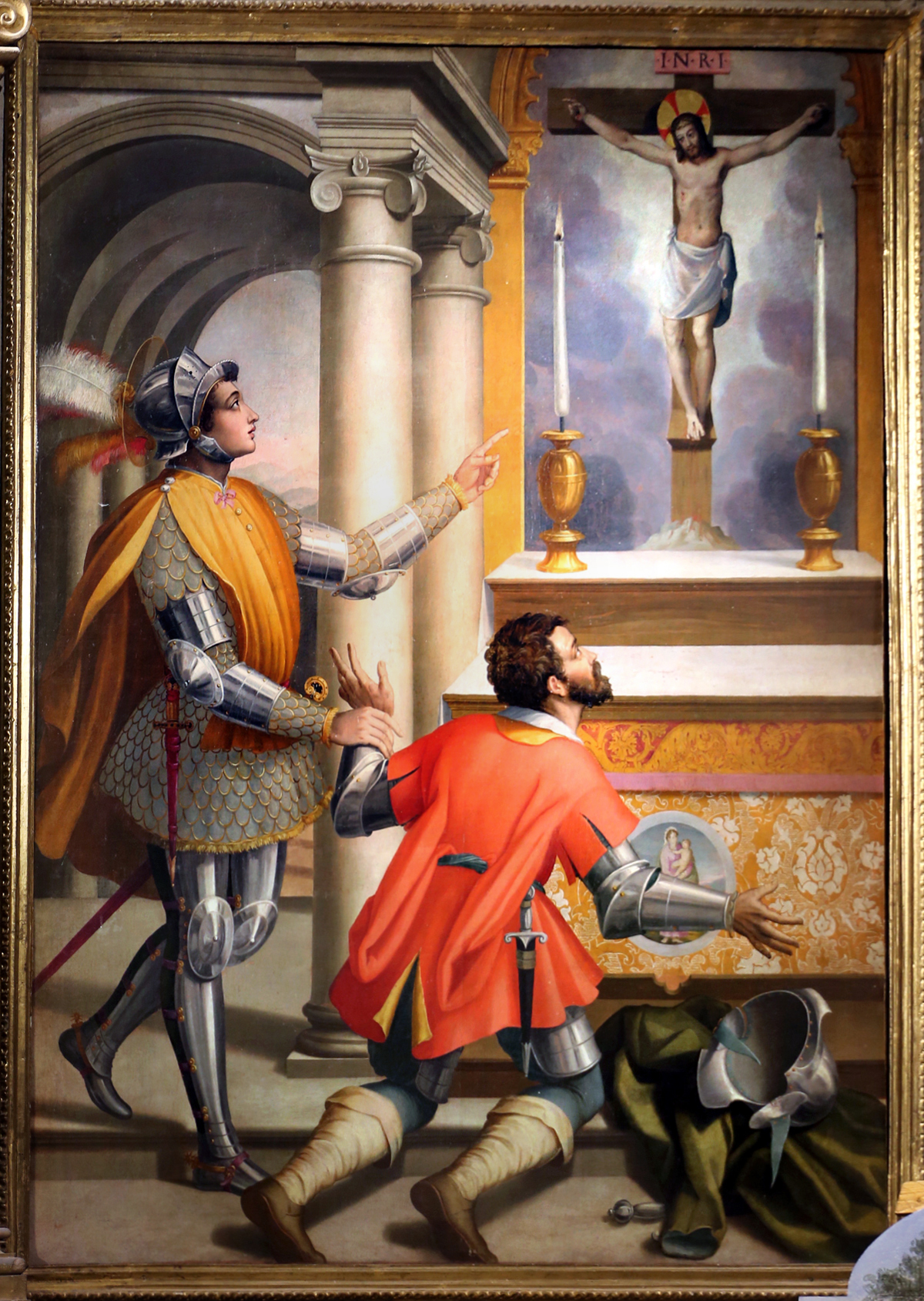
Alessandro Pieroni, San Giovanni Gualberto e l'uccisore di suo fratello davanti al crocifisso di San Miniato, 1580

Alessandro Pieroni (18 April 1550 in Impruneta – 24 July 1607 in Livorno) was an Italian architect and painter. He was active mainly in a Mannerist style, working for the courts of Grandukes Francesco I and Ferdinando I de' Medici, Grand Duke of Tuscany.

== Biography ==
Pieroni was also known as the Sandrino dall' Impruneta. He was born in Florence in 1550 where he graduated from the Accademia del Disegno in 1570. He began his career as an assistant to Alessandro Allori. Allori led the team between 1587 and 1591, including Pieroni, Giovanni Bizelli, Giovanni Maria Butteri, and a young Cigoli in decorating the ceilings of the corridors of the Uffizi in Florence.

For the chapel of San Giovan Gualberto in the Abbey of San Michele in Passignano, Pieroni painted an altarpiece of San Giovan Gualberto pardons the murderers of his brother before the crucifix of San Miniato.

For the visit of Grand-Duke Ferdinand to Pisa in 1588, Pieroni completed, along with the painter Filippo Paladino, a canvas for the church of the Santo Stefano dei Cavalieri, depicting scenes from the life of Santo Stefano Martire. He also helped design the facade. Giorgio Vasari likely also participated in the design of the ceiling decorations. He painted an altarpiece for the Cappella dei Principi in the church of San Lorenzo.

While serving as an artist in the court, he was commissioned works to celebrate the weddings of the Medici. In 1589, he was among the artists engaged in the elaborate decorations to celebrate the marriage of Ferdinando I and Cristina di Lorraine, painting the Defeat of Gian Galeazzo Visconti at Mantua. With Bernardo Buontalenti, he also made scenography for the Theater at the Uffizi, for the 1600 presentation of the comedy La Pellegrina and also made decorations to celebrate the wedding of Marie de' Medici to Henry IV of France.

As an architect, he worked with Bernardo Buontalenti in the design of fortifications of the Belvedere in Florence and the Corsini Chapel in church of the Carmine, and the facade of Santa Maria del Fiore. In Volterra, he helped design the Chapel of St Paul for the Admiral Jacopo Inghirami (and paint the main altarpiece).

Many of his architectural skills were focused on Livorno. When confronted by the Grand Duke about the size of the Cathedral of Livorno (built 1594-1606), he replied that public works can never be too large. He also helped design the church of the Madonna (begun in 1607), the church of the Greci Uniti (1606), and the Synagogue of Livorno (1603). He helped design porticos for the Piazza d'Armi.

His son Giovanni de Galliano Pieroni was an architect; in addition, the elder Pieroni collaborated with Don Giovanni de' Medici, the illegitimate son of Cosimo who dabbled in architecture, mainly the facade of Santo Stefano dei Cavalieri in Pisa.

Pieroni died on 24 July 1607 in Livorno where a street, Via Alessandro Pieroni, is named after him.
