= Camilla Martelli =

Second wife of Cosimo I de' Medici (c. 1545–1590)

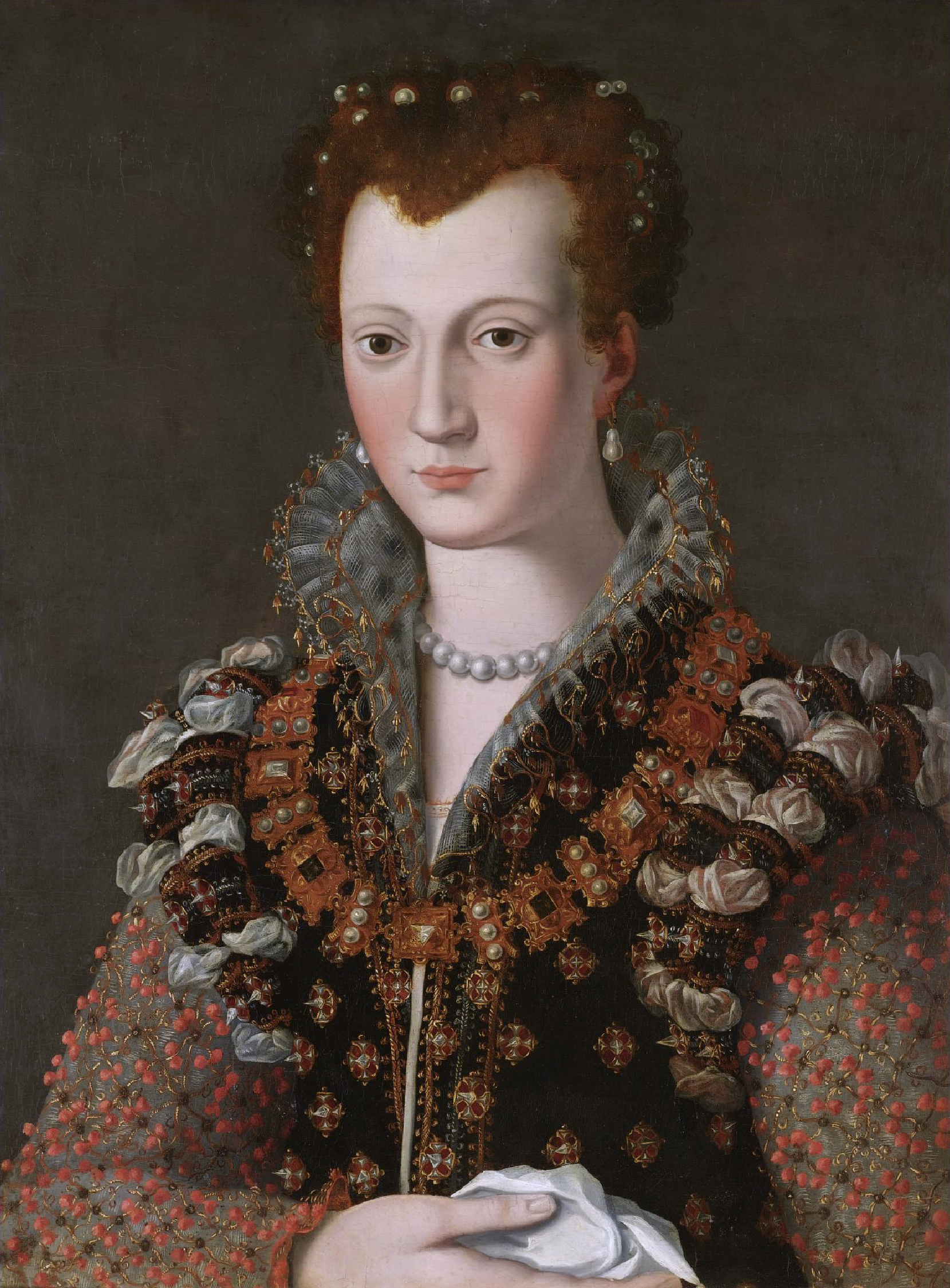
- Camilla Martelli, wife of Cosimo I de' Medici
- Born: c. 1545; Florence, Republic of Florence
- Died: 30 May 1590; Florence, Grand Duchy of Tuscany
- Noble family: Medici (by marriage)
- Spouse: Cosimo I de' Medici (m. 1570; died 1574)
- Issue: Virginia, Duchess of Modena
- Father: Antonio Martelli
- Mother: Elisabetta Soderini

Camilla Martelli (c. 1545 – 30 May 1590) was first the lover and then the second wife of Cosimo I de' Medici, Grand Duke of Tuscany. She was the mother of Virginia de' Medici, future Duchess of Modena.

== Biography ==
Coat of arms of the Martelli family

Born into one of the most important families of the Florentine patricians, Martelli family, Camilla was the daughter of Antonio Martelli and his wife, Fiammetta Soderini. After the death of Cosimo's first wife Eleonora of Toledo and after the end of his relationship with Eleonora degli Albizzi, Camilla became Cosimo's lover despite being 26 years his junior. Camilla stood by him during his middle age, when because of his poor health he retired to private life in the villa di Castello, abdicating in favour of his son Francesco I de' Medici.

Camilla had a daughter with Cosimo in 1568, Virginia, but she was always resented by the children from Cosimo's first marriage. Despite their opposition, Cosimo married Camilla in 1570, at the explicit order of Pope Pius V. However, the marriage was morganatic, and Camilla was not given the title "Grand Duchess." In response to Francesco's complaints, Cosimo wrote, "I am a private person and I have taken as wife a Florentine gentlewoman, and of good family," meaning that because he was no longer Grand Duke, he was free to choose his wife from any rank of society. Their daughter, Virginia, was legitimised and integrated into the Tuscan line of succession.

Camilla was the main focus of bitter arguments between Cosimo and his children in his middle age. They did not agree with her appetite for ostentatious luxury, which appeared vulgar in comparison to the tasteful elegance of his late wife Eleonora of Toledo. The Grand Duke, not to arouse scandal, went into seclusion and prohibited parties and official celebrations.

In 1574 Cosimo I, who had had at least one stroke, had limited mobility and was unable to speak due to circulatory problems; he died on 30 April. After his death, Camilla was forced to retire to the Florentine convent of Murate. She was later moved to the convent of Santa Monica. She was allowed to leave the convent only to attend the wedding of her daughter Virginia, on 6 February 1586, with Cesare d'Este, himself the natural son of Alfonso I d'Este, Duke of Ferrara. Eager to enjoy greater freedom after the death of Francesco I, she asked Grand Duke Ferdinando I to let her leave the convent. He granted her wish, but after a series of political crises, he forced her to return to Santa Monica, where she died in 1590.

== Issue ==
1. Virginia de' Medici (29 May 1568 – 15 January 1615) married Cesare d'Este, Duke of Modena and had further progeny.
