= Eleonora degli Albizzi =

Italian royal mistress (1543–1634)

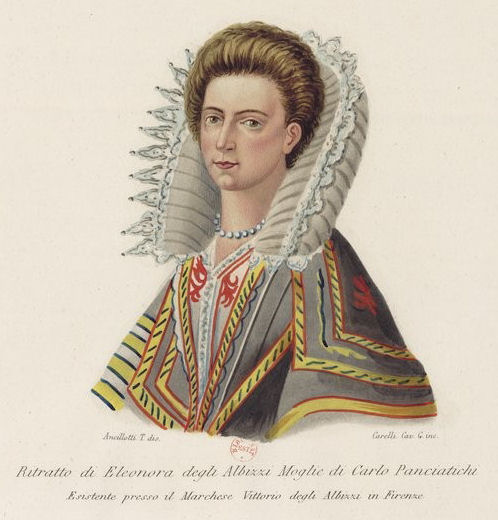
- Born: 1543; Florence, Grand Duchy of Tuscany
- Died: 19 March 1634 (aged 90–91); Florence, Tuscany
- Spouse: Carlo Panciatichi
- Issue: Natural, by Cosimo I de' Medici; Daughter; Giovanni de' Medici legitimate Bartolomeo; Two sons
- Father: Lugi degli Albizzi
- Mother: Nannina Soderini

Eleonora degli Albizzi (1543 – 19 March 1634) was a mistress of Cosimo I de' Medici, the Grand Duke of Tuscany. She had an illegitimate son with him, Don Giovanni de' Medici.

== History ==
She was the daughter of an ancient Florentine family of moderate means, daughter of Luigi degli Albizzi and Nannina Soderini. With the consent of her father, by 1565, at the age of about 23–24 years, she became the mistress of the Granduke, who was a widower since the death of Eleonora of Toledo in 1562. In 1566, Albizzi had a daughter with the Duke. She soon died as an infant. In 1567 she had a son, Giovanni.

Rumors began to circulate that Cosimo wish to legitimize his union to Eleonora. Tradition holds that his long-time chamberlain Sforza Almeni of Perugia shared the Duke's desires with Francesco I, the legitimate heir who was increasingly the dominant force in the government. Francesco, likely worried about the entry of potential heirs and a mother-in-law, scolded his father about those plans. Thereupon, seized by rage because his secret desires had been revealed, on May 22, 1566, the Granduke is said to have stabbed his chamberlain to death. This event, along with others episodes such as the rumored murder of Filippo Strozzi the Younger, reinforced a perception that Cosimo was possessed of an excessively passionate, if not bloodthirsty, ruthlessness.

The love affair between Cosimo and Eleonora quickly cooled. In 1567 she was forced to marry the dishonored nobleman Carlo Panciatichi, who had faced execution for rebellion; he was pardoned and granted a compensation of 10 thousand scudi to take Eleonora. It is unclear what role his legitimate children played in arranging to remove Albizzi from the Grand Duke's orbit. (Meanwhile, Cosimo had started an affair with another young woman, Camilla Martelli.)

Eleonora had three children with Carlo, including Bartolomeo (born 1577). However, in 1578, she was accused of adultery and confined to the Monastery of Fuligno. She lived at the monastery for the last 56 years of her life.
