= Commesso =

Artistic mosaic technique

Commesso, also referred to as Florentine mosaic, is a method of piecing together cut sections of luminous, narrow gemstones to form works of art. Precise patterns are cut into a slab of (generally black) marble. Gems are then cautiously cut and meticulously inlaid into these patterns. The work is then polished section by section, as it cannot be polished as a whole due to gems having different hardnesses. The practice, which began in Florence, Italy, dates back to at least the 14th century and gained prominence just before the 17th century. Some of its uses include making pictures and decorating furniture and architecture.

== Image gallery ==
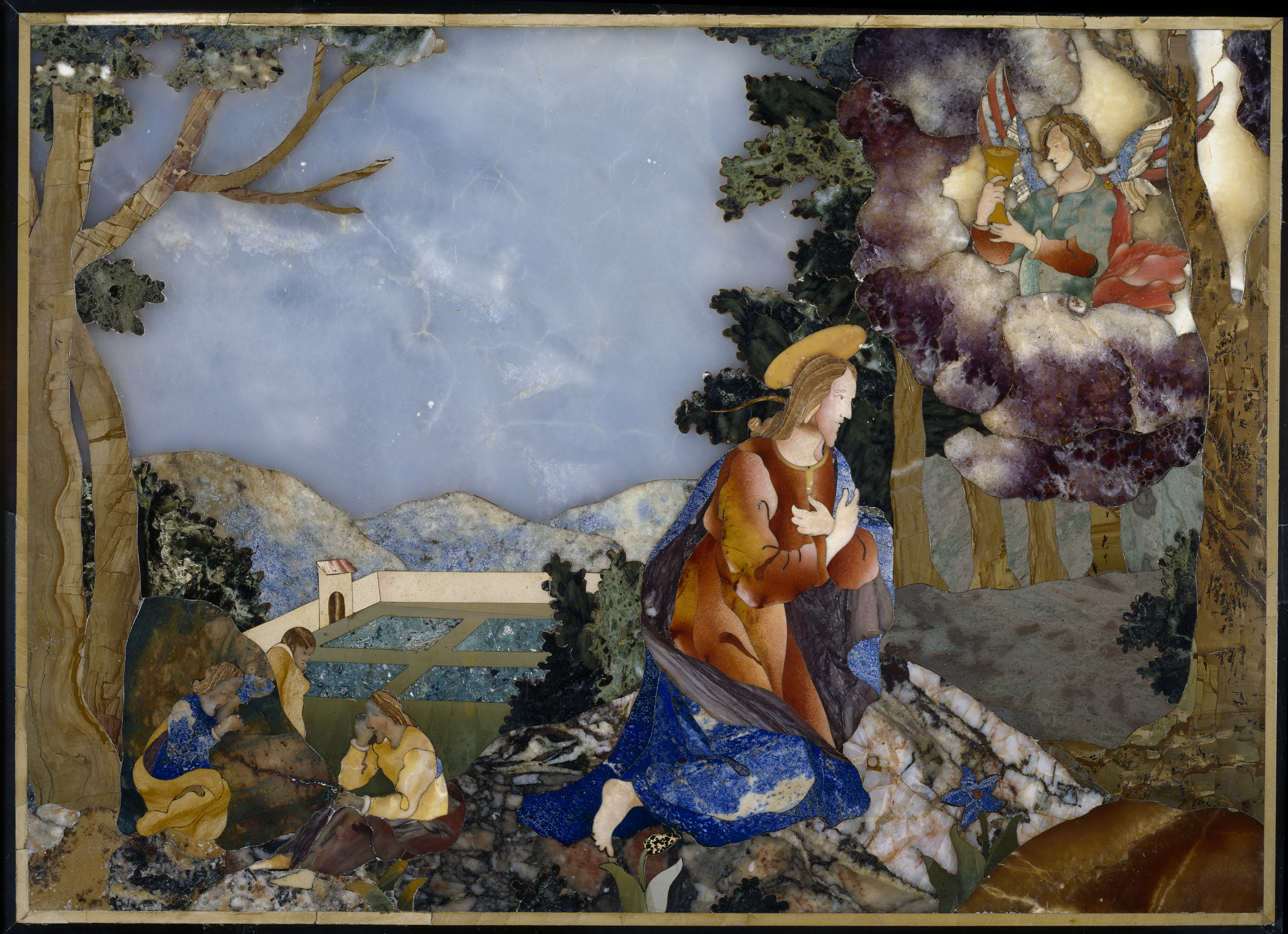
Agony in the Garden, circa 1604, Prado Museum

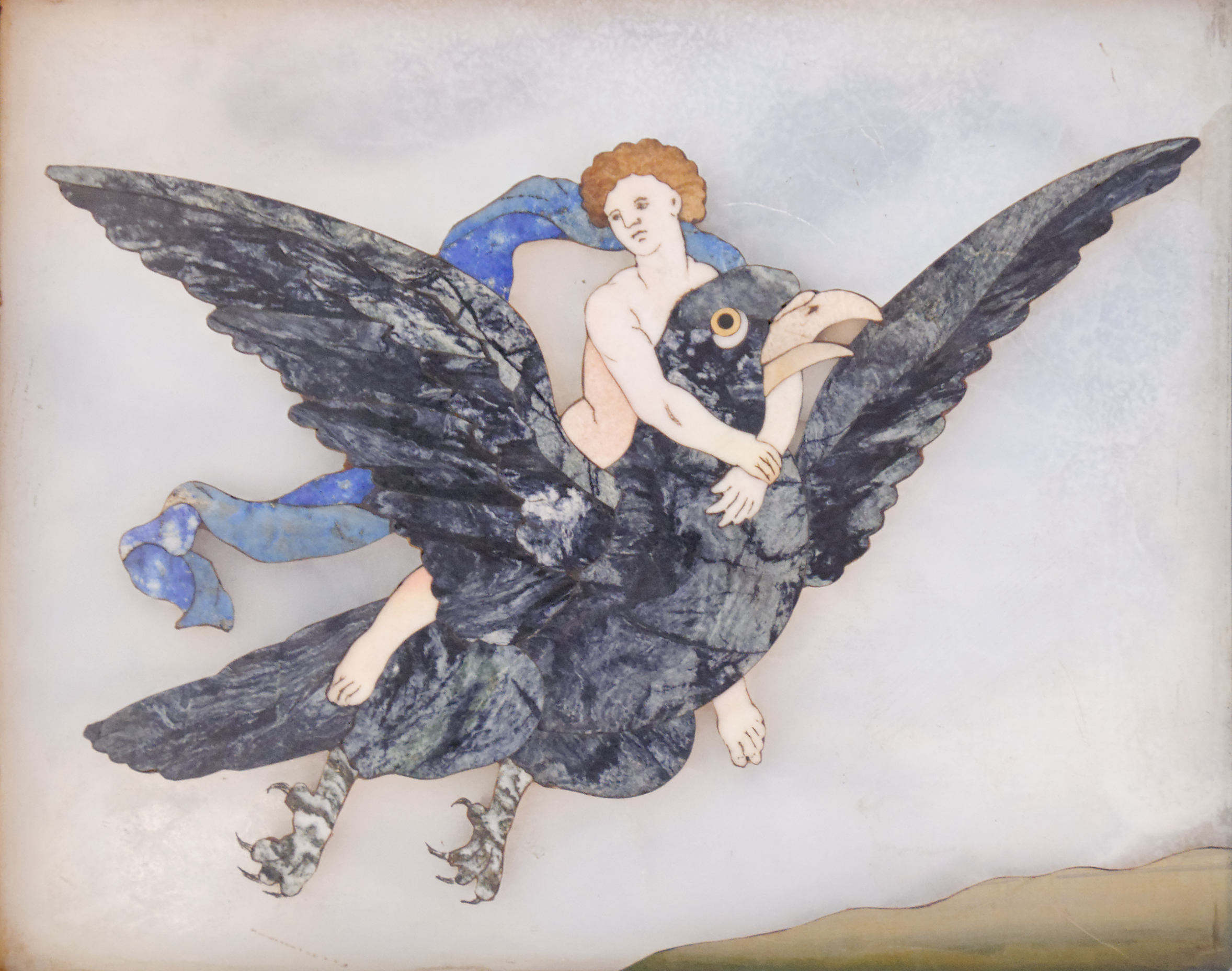
The rape of Ganymede, panel from a cabinet with mythological scenes

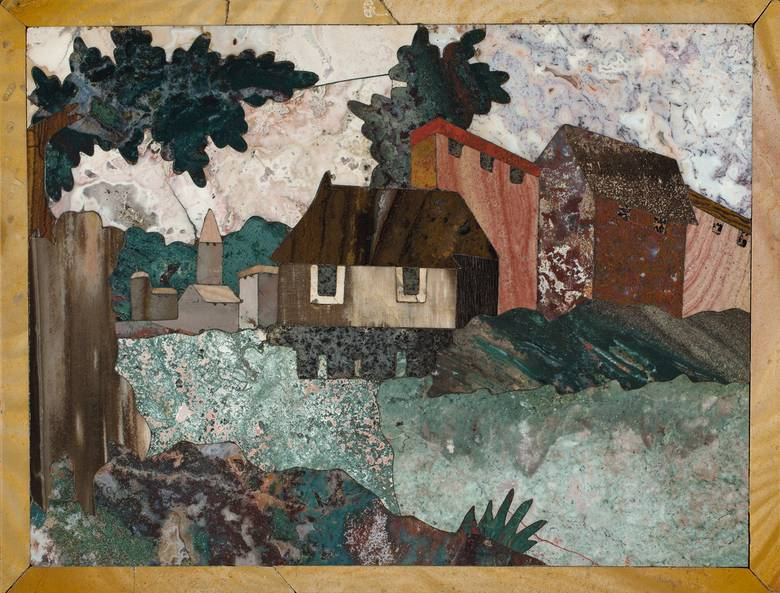
Commesso in pietre dure

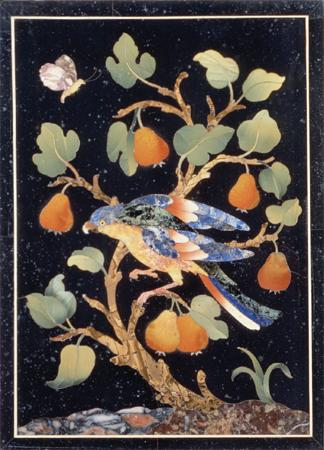
Panel with a Parrot on a Pear Tree

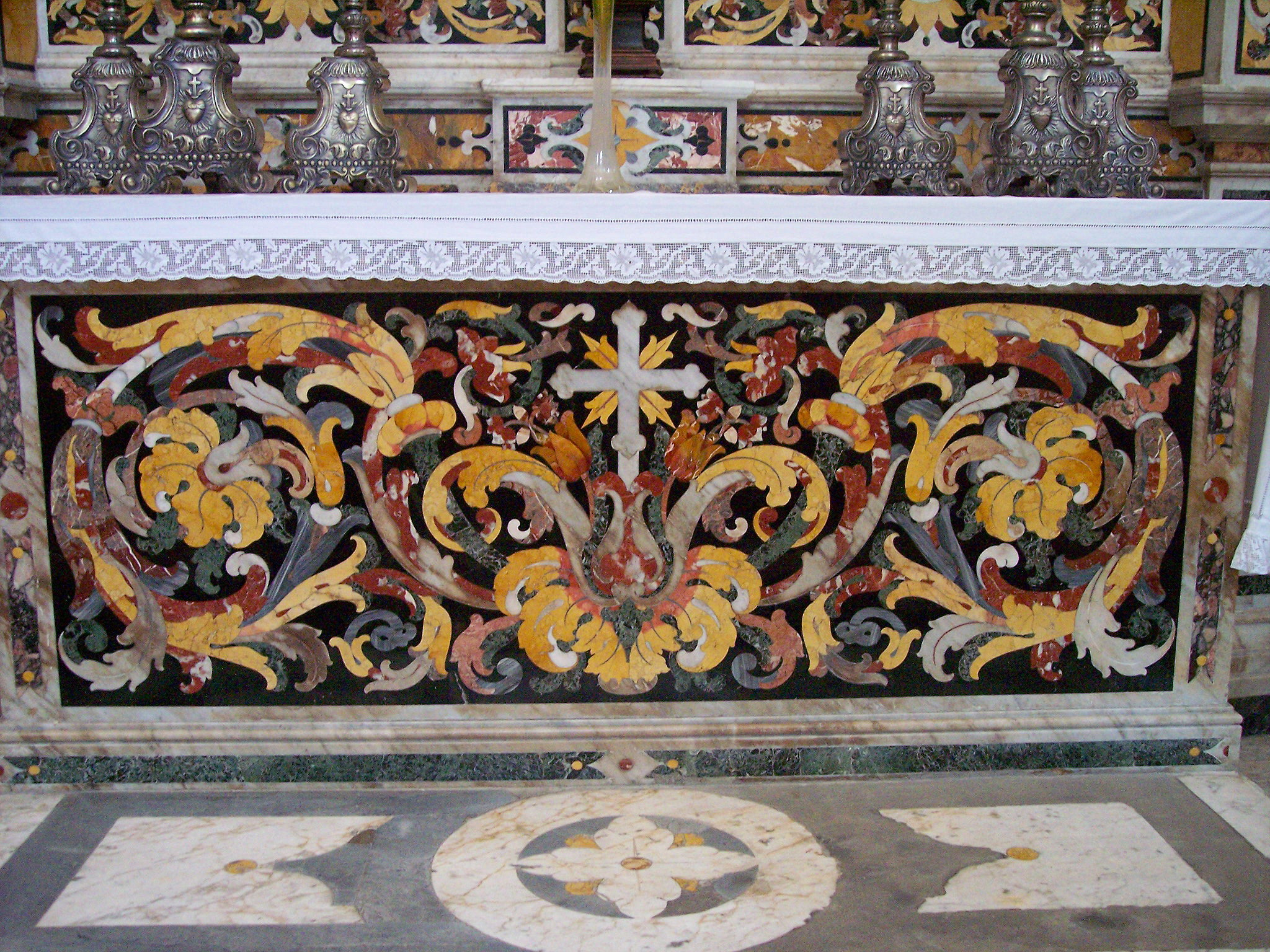
Altar decorated in commesso

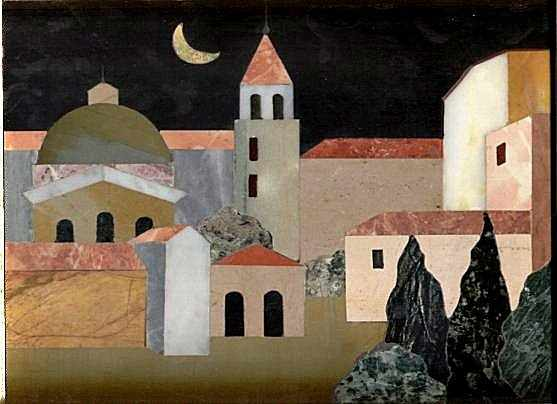
Nightscape

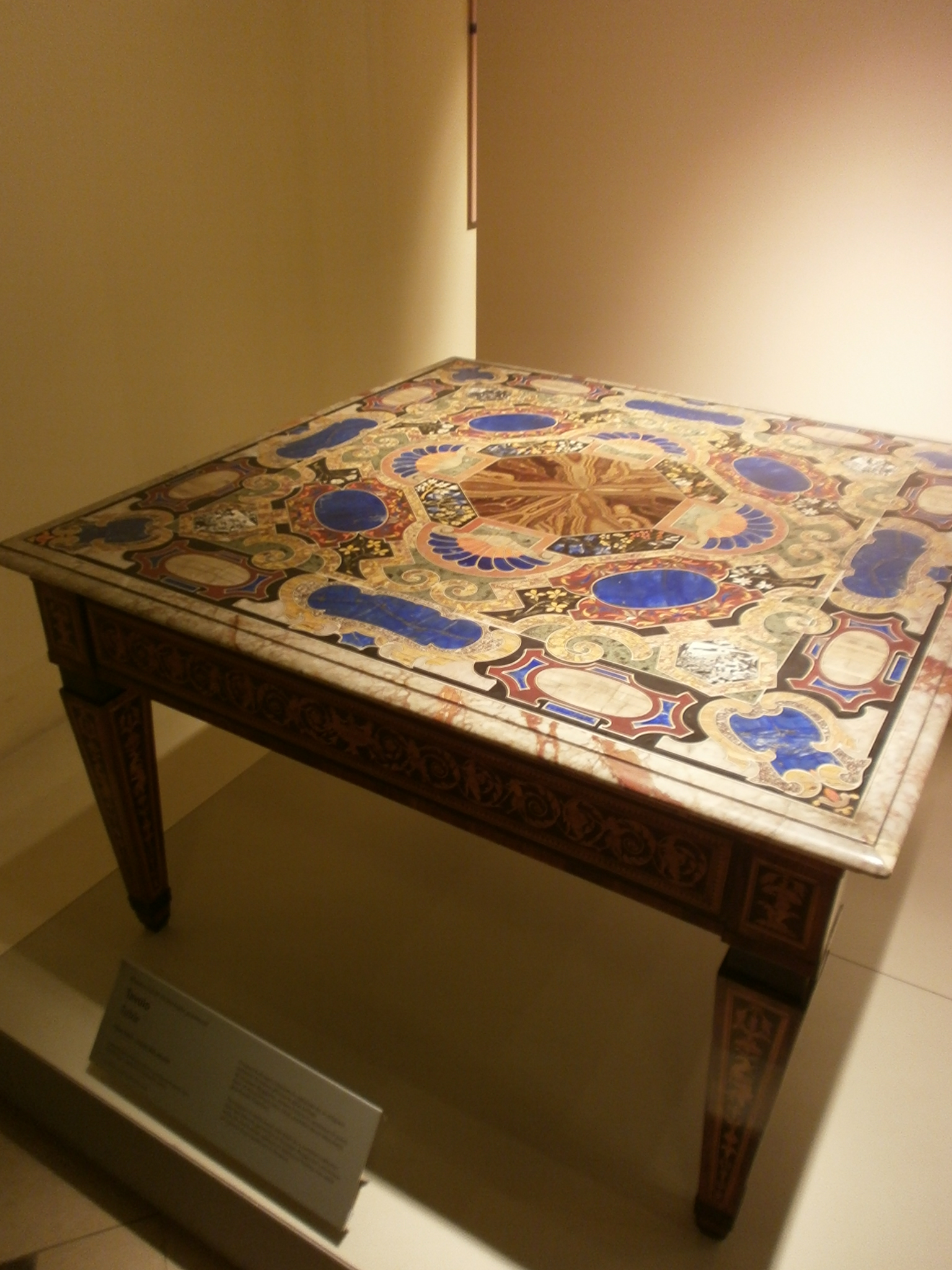
A commesso table

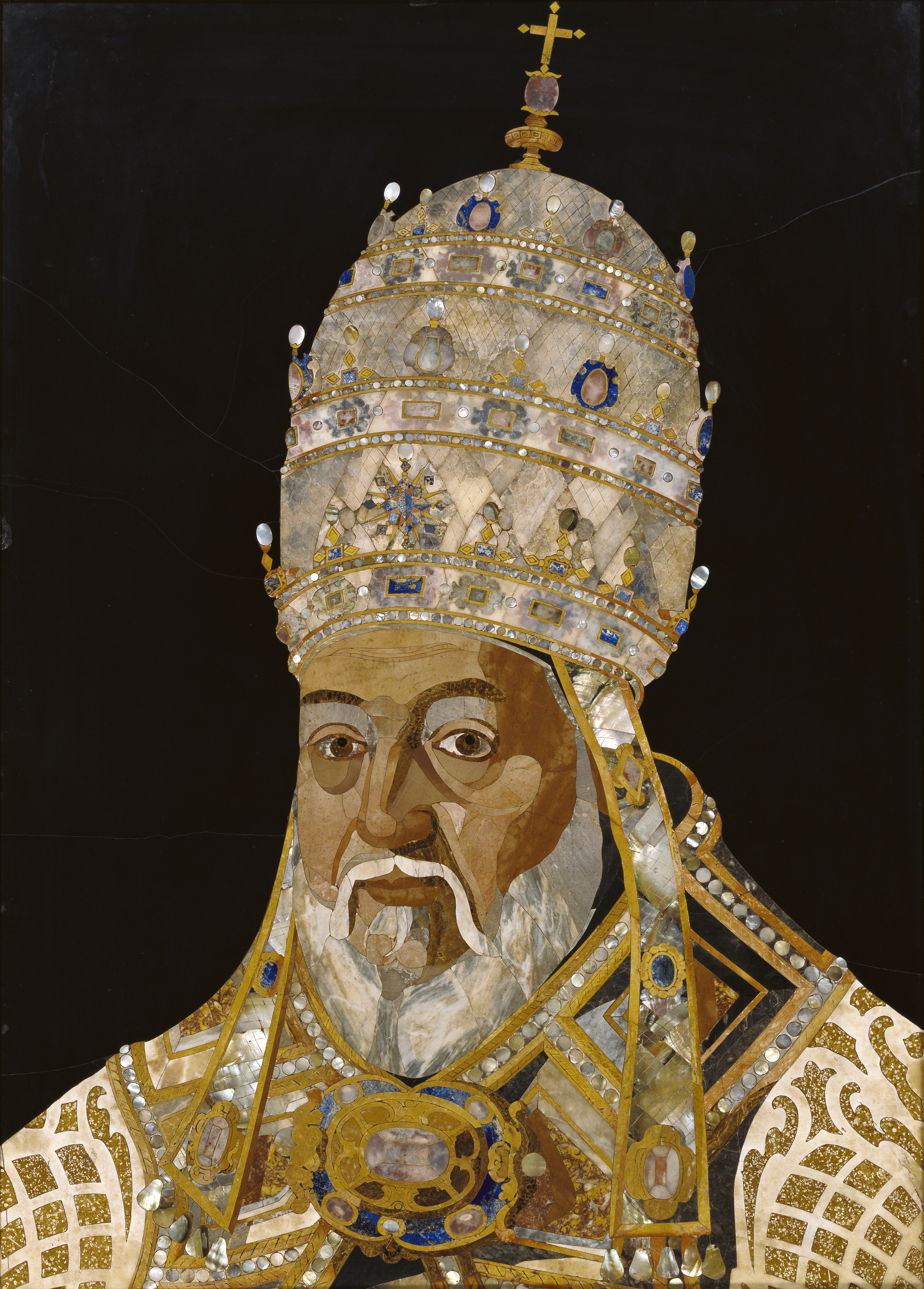
Clement VIII

== See also ==
- Mosaic
- Florentine painting
- Opificio delle pietre dure
