= Opificio delle pietre dure =

Institute of the Italian Ministry for Cultural Heritage based in Florence

Coordinates: 43°46′34″N 11°15′32″E

The Opificio delle pietre dure, literally meaning "Workshop of semi-precious stones", is a public institute of the Italian Ministry for Cultural Heritage based in Florence. It is a global leader in the field of art restoration and provides teaching as one of two Italian state conservation schools (the other being the Istituto Superiore per la Conservazione ed il Restauro). The institute maintains also a specialist library and archive of conservation and a museum displaying historic examples of pietre dure inlaid semi-precious stones artefacts. A scientific laboratory conducts research and diagnostics and provides a preventive conservation service.

== Origins and early history ==
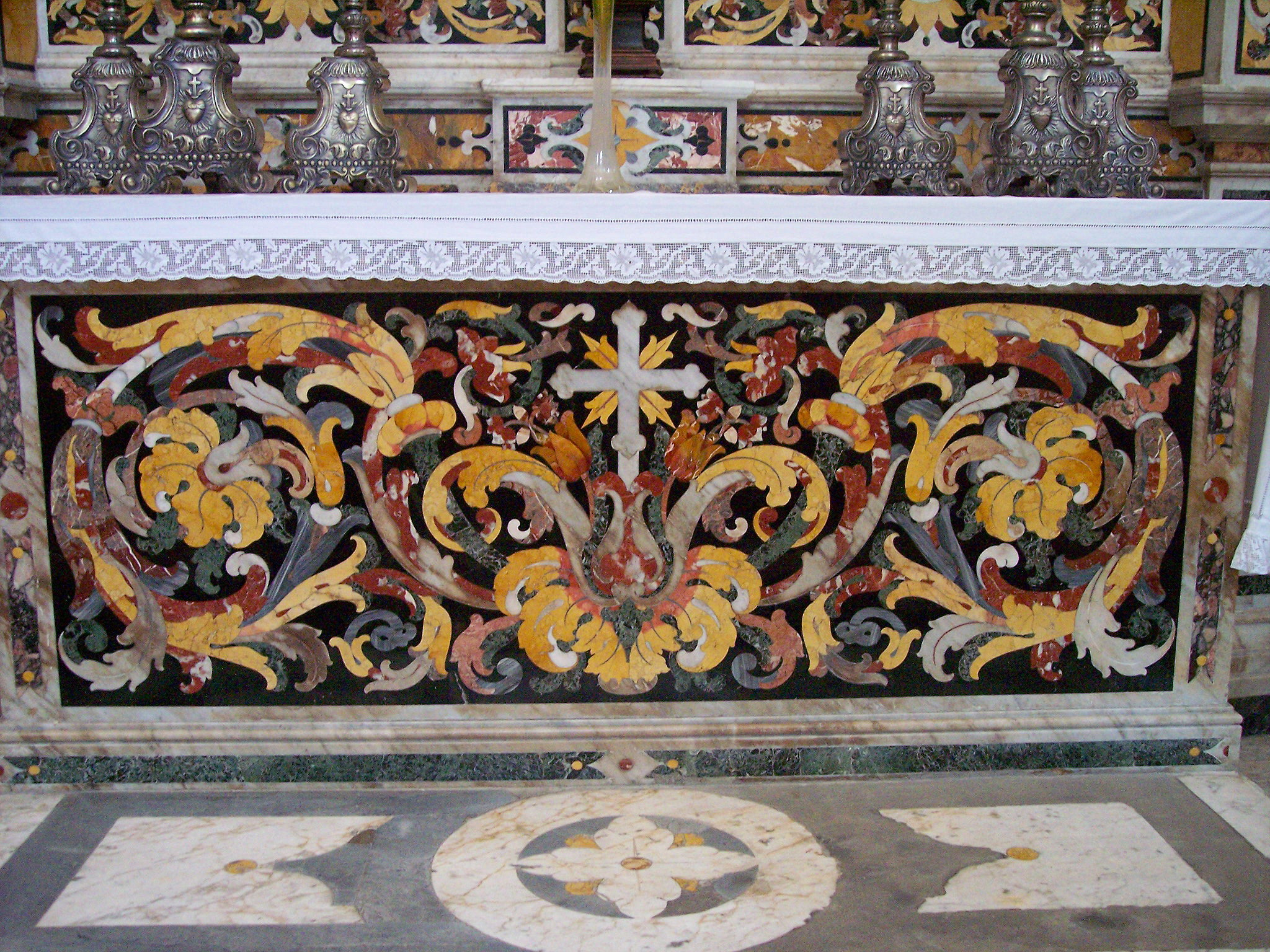
Altar decorated in commesso, (Cathedral of the Assumption of the Virgin Mary (Velika Gospa), Dubrovnik)

Being one of the famous artistic workshops of the Italian Renaissance, the Opificio was established in 1588 at the behest of Ferdinando I de' Medici to provide the elaborate, inlaid precious and semi-precious stoneworks. One of the masterpieces of the crafts is the overall decoration of the Cappella dei Principi (Chapel of Princes) in the Basilica di San Lorenzo di Firenze. The technique, which originated from Byzantine inlay work, was perfected by the Opificio masters and the artworks they produced became known as opera di commessi medicei (commesso is the old name of the technique, similar to ancient mosaics) and later as commesso in pietre dure (semi-precious stones mosaic).

The artisans performed the exceptionally skilled and delicate task of inlaying thin veneers of semi-precious stones especially selected for their colour, opacity, brilliance, and grain to create elaborate decorative and pictorial effects. Items of extraordinary refinement were created in this way, from furnishings to all manner of artworks. Today, artisans trained at the Opificio assist many of the world's museums in their restoration programmes.

The Opificio workshops were originally located in the Casino Mediceo, then in the Uffizi and were finally moved to their present location in Via Alfani in 1796. After the end of the 19th century, the institute's activities moved away from the production of works of art and towards its restoration. At first specialising in hardstone carving, in which the workshops were a world authority, and then later expanding into other related fields (stone and marble sculptures, bronzes, and ceramics).

== Recent history ==
The second branch of the Institute (laboratori di restauro) had a more modern story. In 1932, Ugo Procacci, the distinguished scholar of Florentine art, in his career as an officer of the Italian Ministry for Cultural Heritage, founded a Laboratory of restoration (original Italian name: Gabinetto di restauro) at the Florence Soprintendenza. It was the first modern restoration laboratory in Italy (pre-dating by 7 years the Istituto Superiore per la Conservazione ed il Restauro in Rome) and one of the first in the world.

The Gabinetto di Restauro used scientific methods for the preliminary examination of the works of art (as X radiography) and began an outstanding campaign of restoration on Tuscan Early Masters paintings, that was later known as restauri di rivelazione (literally meaning revealing restoration).

In 1966, the fatal tragedy of the flooding of the River Arno, resulted in many priceless works of art requiring restoration. It provided a significant impetus for expansion of the Gabinetto di restauro's research and restorative services. More space was needed because of the sheer number of artworks which required restoration and also, in some cases, the large size of the pieces themselves, such as the immense 4.48-by-3.9-metre (14.7 ft × 12.8 ft) Crucifix by Cimabue from the Basilica di Santa Croce. The expansions provided new laboratories in the Fortezza da Basso. Thanks to financial aid and an influx of expertise from throughout the world, the Florentine Laboratory became, in a short time one of the vanguard restoration laboratories in the world, combining traditional practices with modern technology.

In 1975, the Cultural Heritage Ministry merged the Opificio laboratories with the Gabinetto di restauro (plus other minor Florentine restoration laboratories) and created a new Institute, the modern Opificio delle pietre dure.

Today, the institute is organised in departments specific for the various types of artworks it treats. The laboratories are in three principal venues: in Via Alfani 78, in the historic centre of Florence; in the Fortezza da Basso; and in Palazzo Vecchio where restoration treatments on tapestries and textiles are carried out. There are also several research and services offices.

The current (as of March 26, 2012) superintendent is Marco Ciatti. The Opificio has a board of directors of the departments, under the supervision of the superintendent. It has also a gestional committee and a scientific committee.

=== Departments ===
- Tapestries and carpets
- Bronzes and ancient weapons
- Wooden sculptures
- Wall painting
- Drawings and prints
- Stoneworks
- Pietre dure mosaics
- Jewelry
- Easel paintings
- Terracotta and potteries
- Textiles

== Museum ==
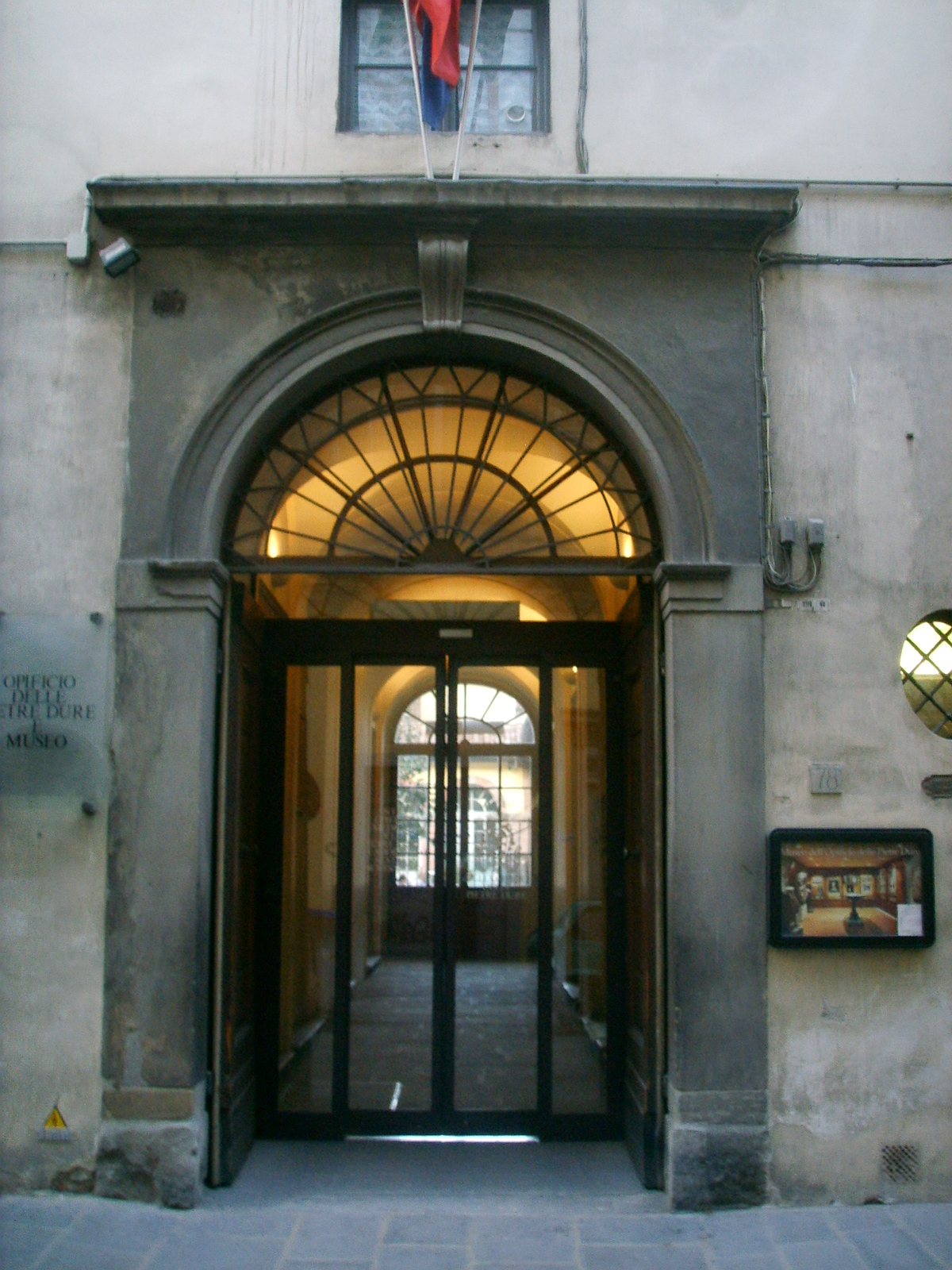

The small museum in the Via Alfani displays examples of pietre dure works, including cabinets, table tops and plates, showing an immense repertoire of decoration, usually either flowers, fruits and animals, but also sometimes other picturesque scenes, including a famous view of the Piazza della Signoria. There is also a large baroque fireplace entirely covered in malachite, a dazzling and brilliant green stone as well as copies of painting executed in inlaid stone. Some of the exhibition space is dedicated to particular types of stone, such as the paesina, extracted near Florence, the grain and colour of which can be used to create vivid landscapes.

An exhibition of the technical processes of pietre dure works through history, can be found on the first floor as well as a large range of finished works dating back to the time of the Medici. There are vases and furnishings decorated with Art Nouveau designs of the late 19th and early 20th centuries, including a tabletop with a harp and garland by Emilio Zocchi (1849) and another decorated with flowers and birds by Niccolò Betti (1855).
