= New Synagogue of Livorno =

Synagogue in Livorno, Italy

- Italian: Tempio Maggiore di Livorno
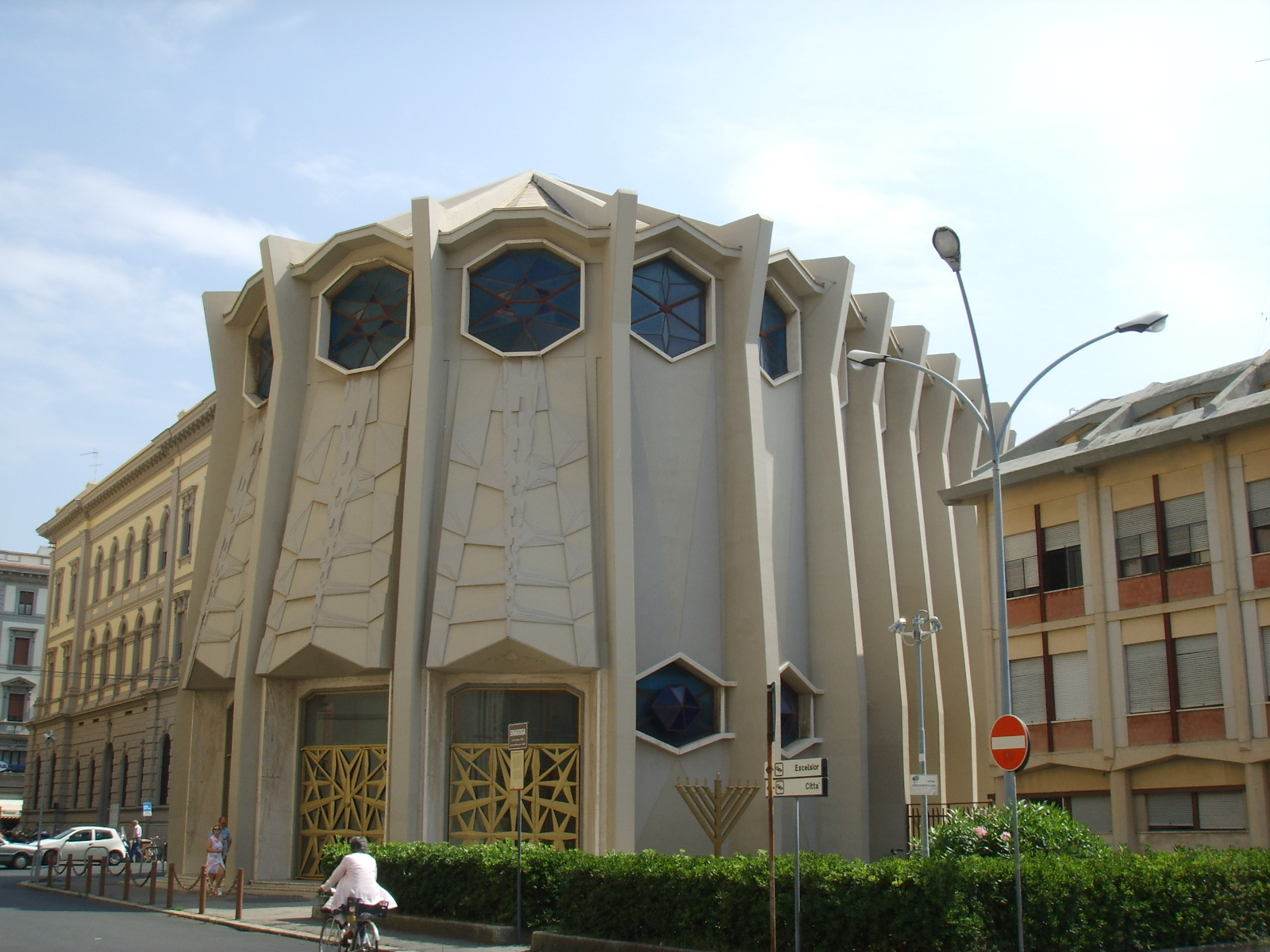
- The new synagogue in 2007

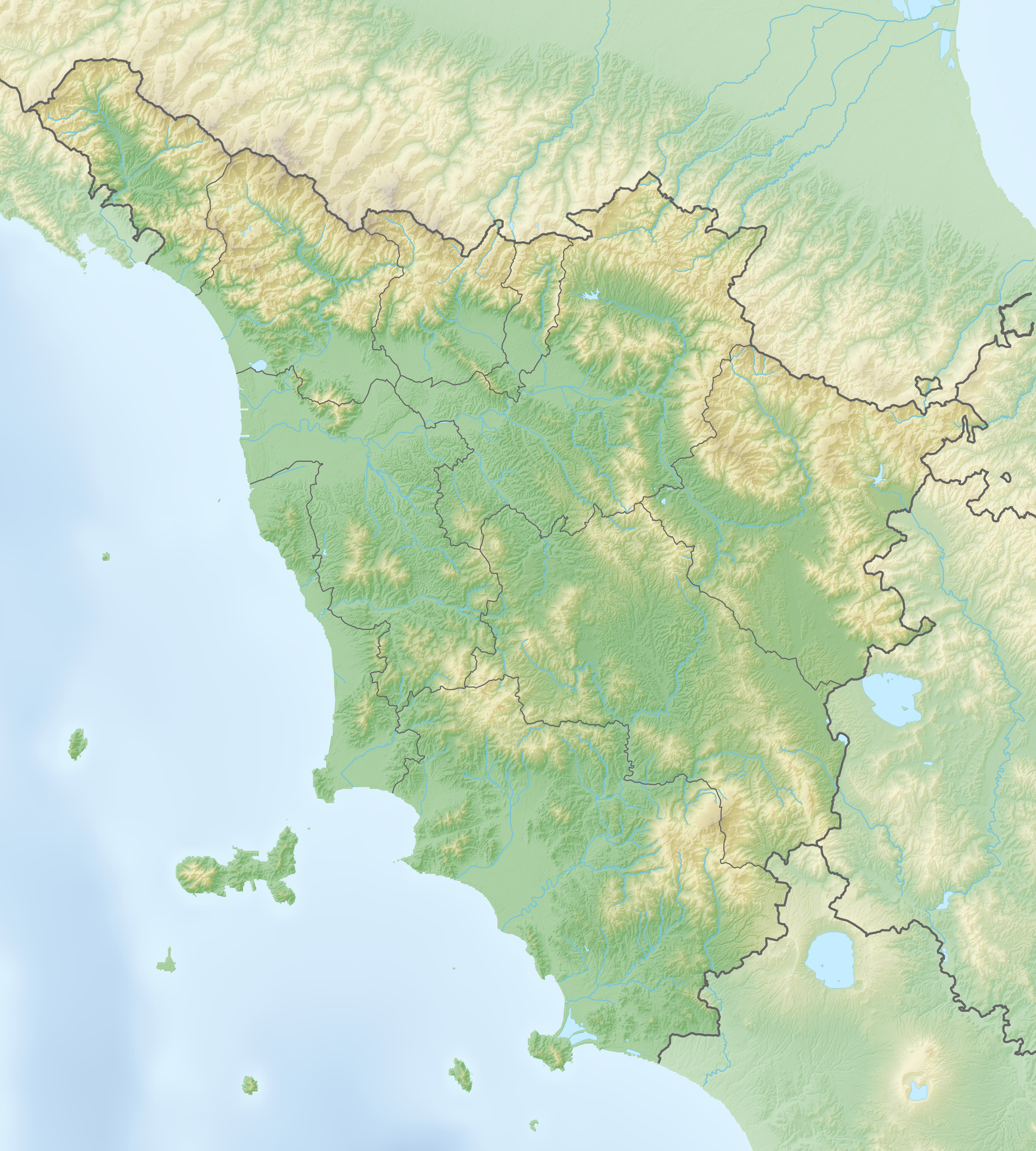
- Location of the synagogue in Tuscany

Religion
- Affiliation: Judaism
- Rite: Spanish rite
- Ecclesiastical or organizational status: Synagogue
- Status: Active

Location
- Location: Piazza Benamozegh 1, Livorno, Tuscany
- Country: Italy
- Interactive map of New Synagogue of Livorno
- Coordinates: 43°32′56″N 10°18′33″E

Architecture
- Architects: Angelo di Castro; Angelo Scoccianti
- Type: Synagogue architecture
- Style: Modernist
- Established: 1603 (as a congregation)
- Groundbreaking: 1958
- Completed: 1962
- Materials: Concrete

The New Synagogue of Livorno, or Great Synagogue of Livorno (Italian: Tempio Maggiore di Livorno), is a Jewish congregation and synagogue, that is located at Piazza Benamozegh 1, in Livorno, in Tuscany, Italy. Designed in the Modernist style, the synagogue was completed in 1962.

The synagogue replaced the Old Synagogue of Livorno, completed in 1603 and devastated by Nazis in 1944.

== Architecture ==
The new Synagogue of Livorno is the main Jewish place of worship of the 700 Jews of Livorno who survived The Holocaust. The Temple is located in Piazza Elijah Benamozegh, not far from Piazza Grande, on the site of the ancient synagogue which was partially destroyed during World War II. It is one of the four synagogues built in the 1900s in Italy and is the only one erected after World War II. The synagogue was designed by the Italian architect Angelo Di Castro, the works began in 1958 and it was inaugurated on October 23, 1962.

The Temple is a modern, bold and original construction in reinforced concrete inspired by the tent in the desert in memory of The Exodus assigned to the guard of the Ark of the Covenant. At the centre of the synagogue is positioned the bimah, built with marbles recovered from the old destroyed synagogue; in front of it is the wooden Torah ark by Angelo Scoccianti, work dating from 1708 recuperated from the Synagogue of Pesaro. The Matroneum is placed on the back of the bimah at the first floor while in the superior part of the apse is a red stained glass in memory of the victims of The Holocaust. In the lower level is the Oratorio Lampronti where the bimah and the Torah ark come from the Temple of Spanish rite of Ferrara; the Oratory is used as synagogue in the winter time.

== See also ==
- History of the Jews in Italy
- List of synagogues in Italy
- Old Synagogue of Livorno
