= Cappella dei Principi =

Mausoleum at San Lorenzo, Florence

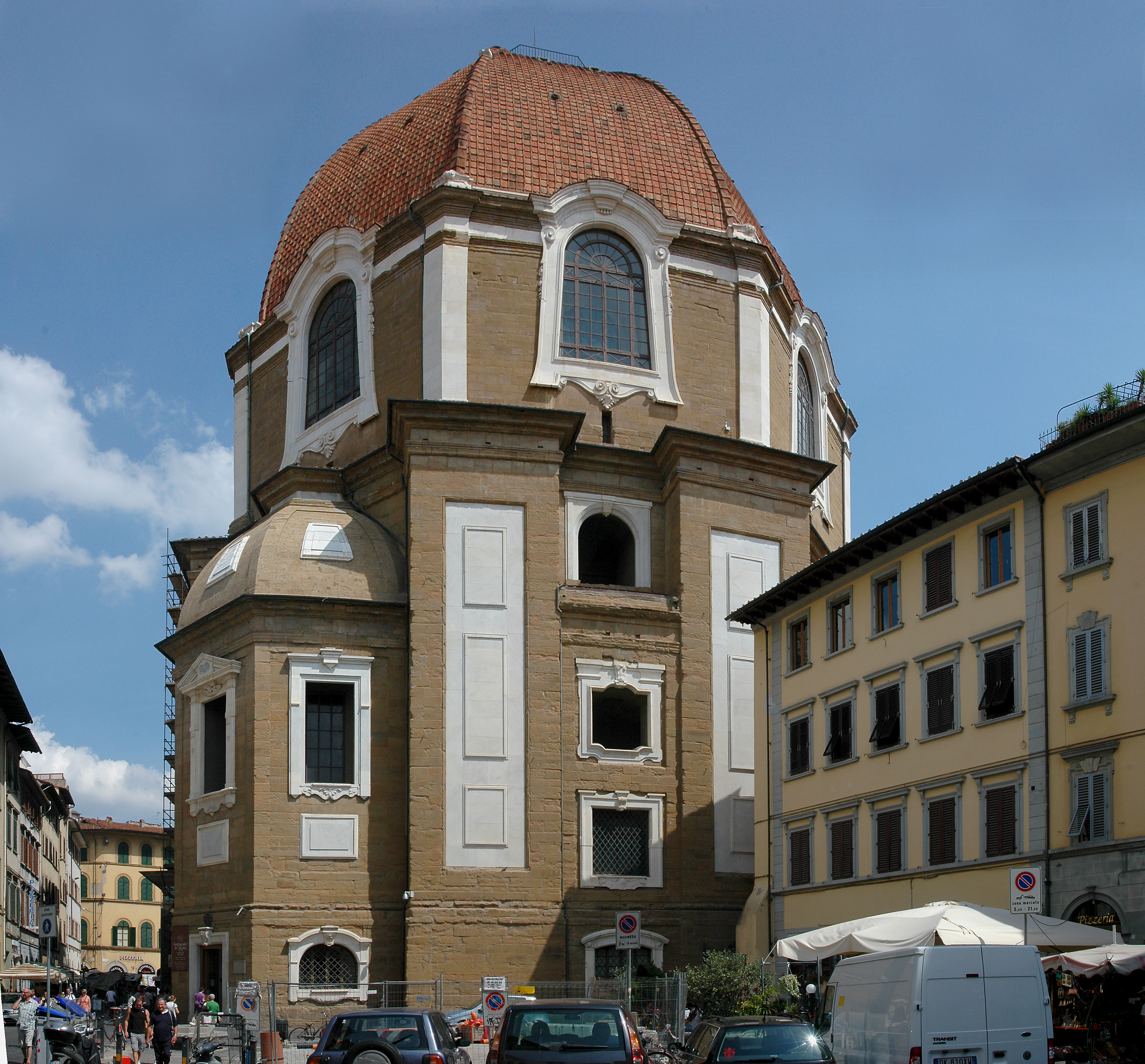
- Established: 1604
- Location: Piazza Madonna degli Aldobrandini, Florence, Italy
- Coordinates: 43°46′30″N 11°15′11″E
- Visitors: 321,043
- Director: Monica Bietti

The Cappella dei Principi ('Chapel of the Princes') is the mausoleum of the Grand Dukes of Tuscany and their families and is part of the museum complex of the Medici Chapels, adjacent to the Basilica of San Lorenzo, Florence.

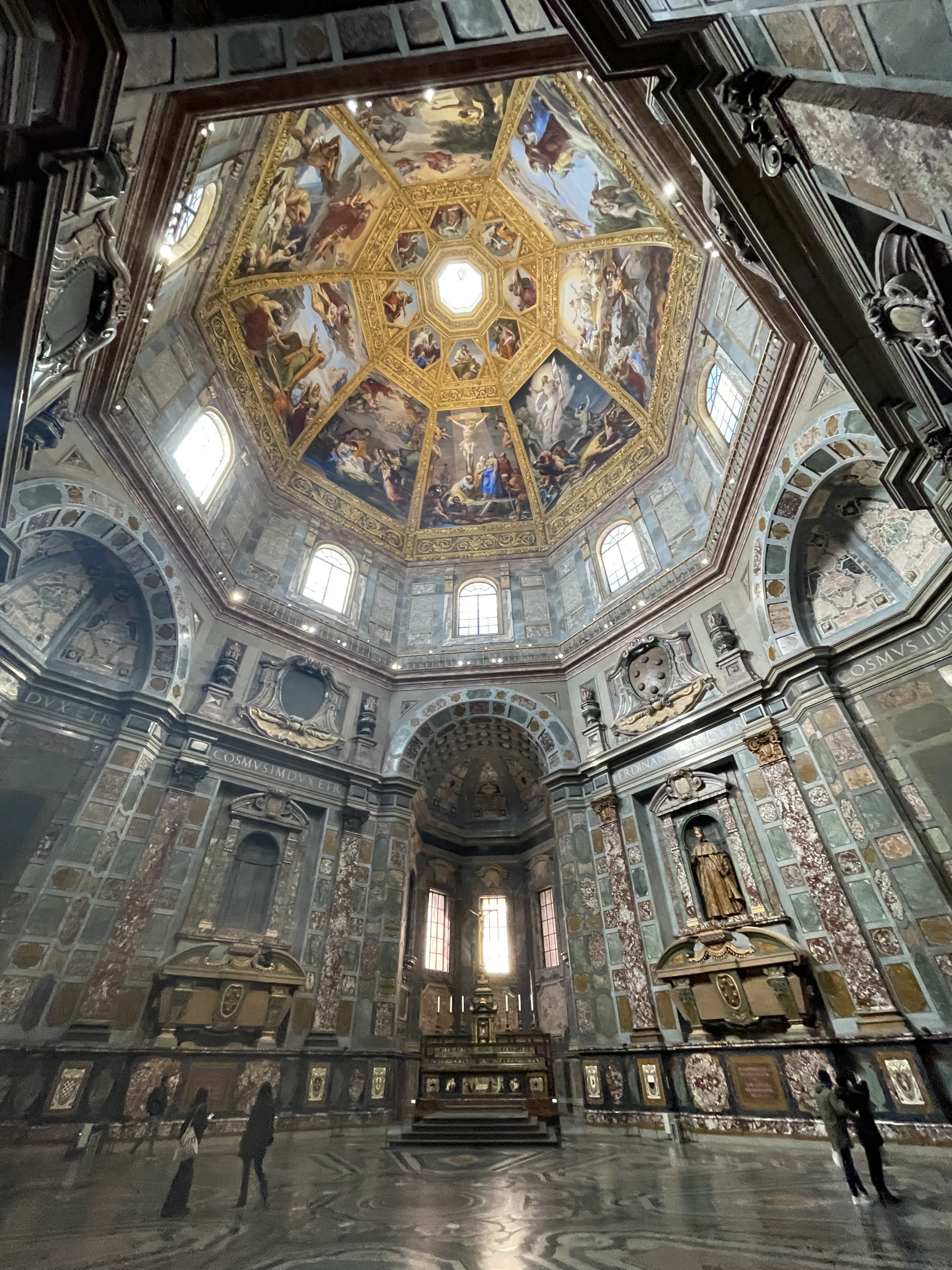
Interior

== History ==
The chapel was based on the idea that the Grand Duke Cosimo II de' Medici wanted to create a monument for a family tomb. Work began on the tomb under Grand Duke Ferdinando I de' Medici, who appointed the architect and sculptor Matteo Nigetti in 1604, based on a design by Don Giovanni de' Medici, brother of the Grand Duke himself. Nigetti completed the mausoleum in 1640. He was assisted by the architects Alessandro Pieroni and Don Giovanni de' Medici.

It has a large dome and marble interior. The octagonal room is 28 metres (92 ft) wide and is surmounted by a dome which reaches a height of 59 metres (194 ft), the second most majestic in the city after Filippo Brunelleschi's dome.

During the first half of the eighteenth century, the Italian noblewoman Anna Maria Luisa de' Medici financed the construction of the large windows and cupola, and the internal decoration of the vault, which was executed by the painter Pietro Benvenuti between 1828 and 1837. The chapel flooring of semiprecious stone inlay was only completed in 1962.

The octagonal room is almost entirely covered with stones and different-coloured marbles. The six porphyry sarcophagi of the Grand Dukes are contained in niches along the walls and are complemented by bronze statues. The interior has rich inlays in commesso, also referred to as Florentine mosaic, a method of piecing together semi-precious stones. The practice was started in 1588 by the famous artistic workshops, the Opificio in Florence, using colored stones, mother of pearl, lapis lazuli, and coral to reproduce the coats of arms of the sixteen Tuscan cities loyal to the Medici family. The paintings in the dome are of the Creation, All, the Death of Abel, the Sacrifice of Noah, the Nativity, the Crucifxion, the Resurrection, and the Last Judgment, and are by Pietro Benvenuti.

The statues of Ferdinand I and Cosimo II de' Medici were executed by Pietro Tacca between 1626 and 1642. The other grand ducal tombs belong to Cosimo I (1519–1574), Francesco I (1541–1587), and Cosimo III (who succeeded Ferdinand II, 1643–1723). The Holy Sepulchre was to have been located in the center of the atrium, although the various attempts to buy or steal it from Jerusalem failed.

The sarcophagi are actually empty and the real remains of the Grand Dukes and their family members (about fifty major and minor) up to Anna Maria Luisa de' Medici (last heir of the dynasty, 1667–1743), are kept in simple rooms created in the floor of the underlying crypt.

From behind the altar there is access to a small room where other precious relics are displayed, some of which were donated to the city by Pope Leo X.

== Early visits to the chapel ==
The Dutch traveler Cornelis de Bruijn visited the chapel on 12 December 1674. He wrote, while describing his visit to Florence:

I also saw a very precious chapel that had been worked on for seventy-eight years, although it was far from being half-finished. This project was started by Ferdinand the First, Duke of Florence. In this chapel, there is a cushion that would have cost thirty thousand crowns, adorned with precious gemstones and decorated with the most beautiful stones obtainable. I was shown a marble stone on which five masters had worked for seven years before it could be used. The altar boasts five heavy pillars of cristal de montagne (rock crystal).

This description was later understood to be a reference to the Cappella dei Principi. If the statement regarding 78 years of work is true, it could indicate that work on the chapel started as early as 1596, when Ferdinand was around 47 years of age. This would also indicate that the already mentioned architect Matteo Nigetti was appointed 8 years after the initial work had started.

== Gallery ==
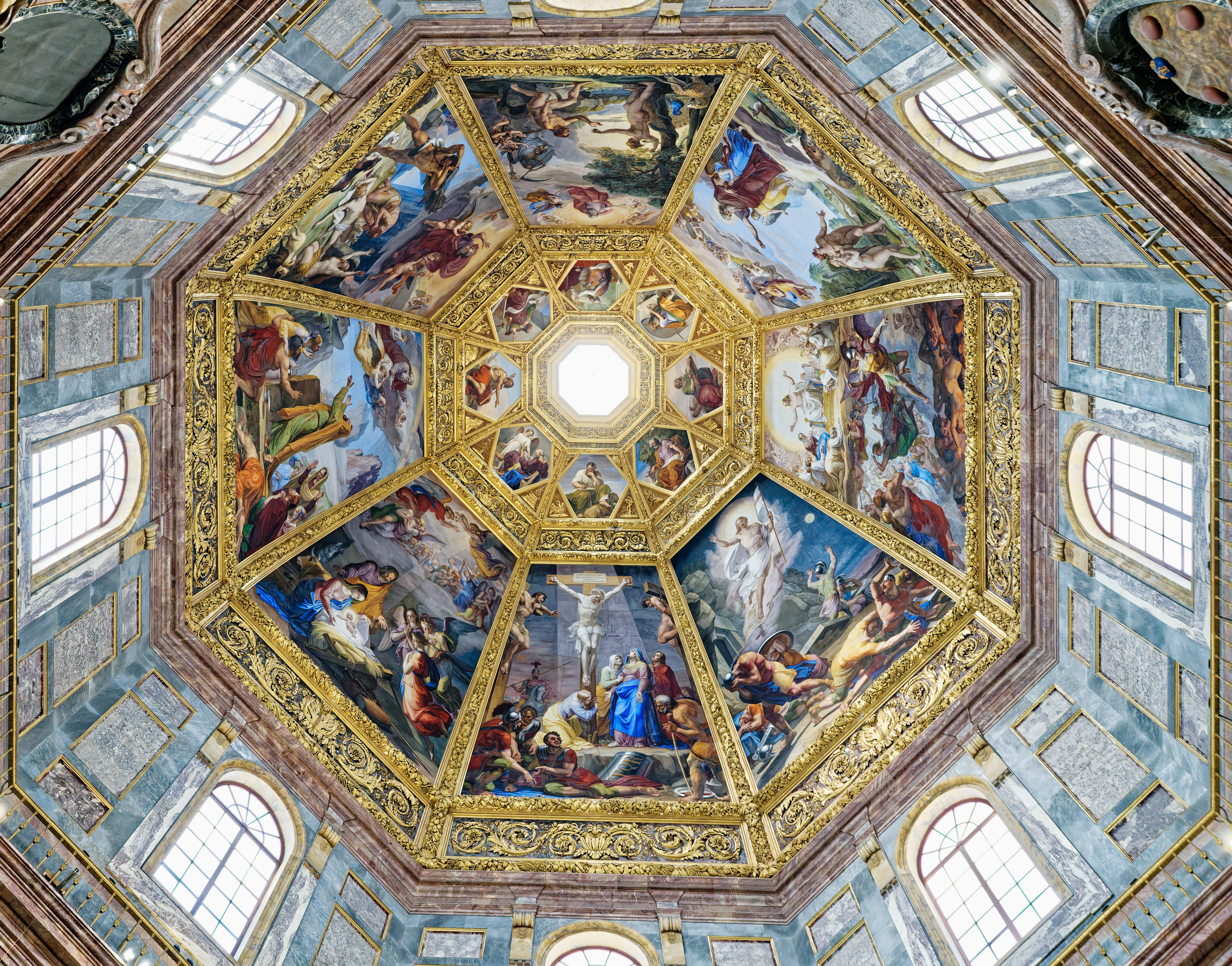
Dome interior

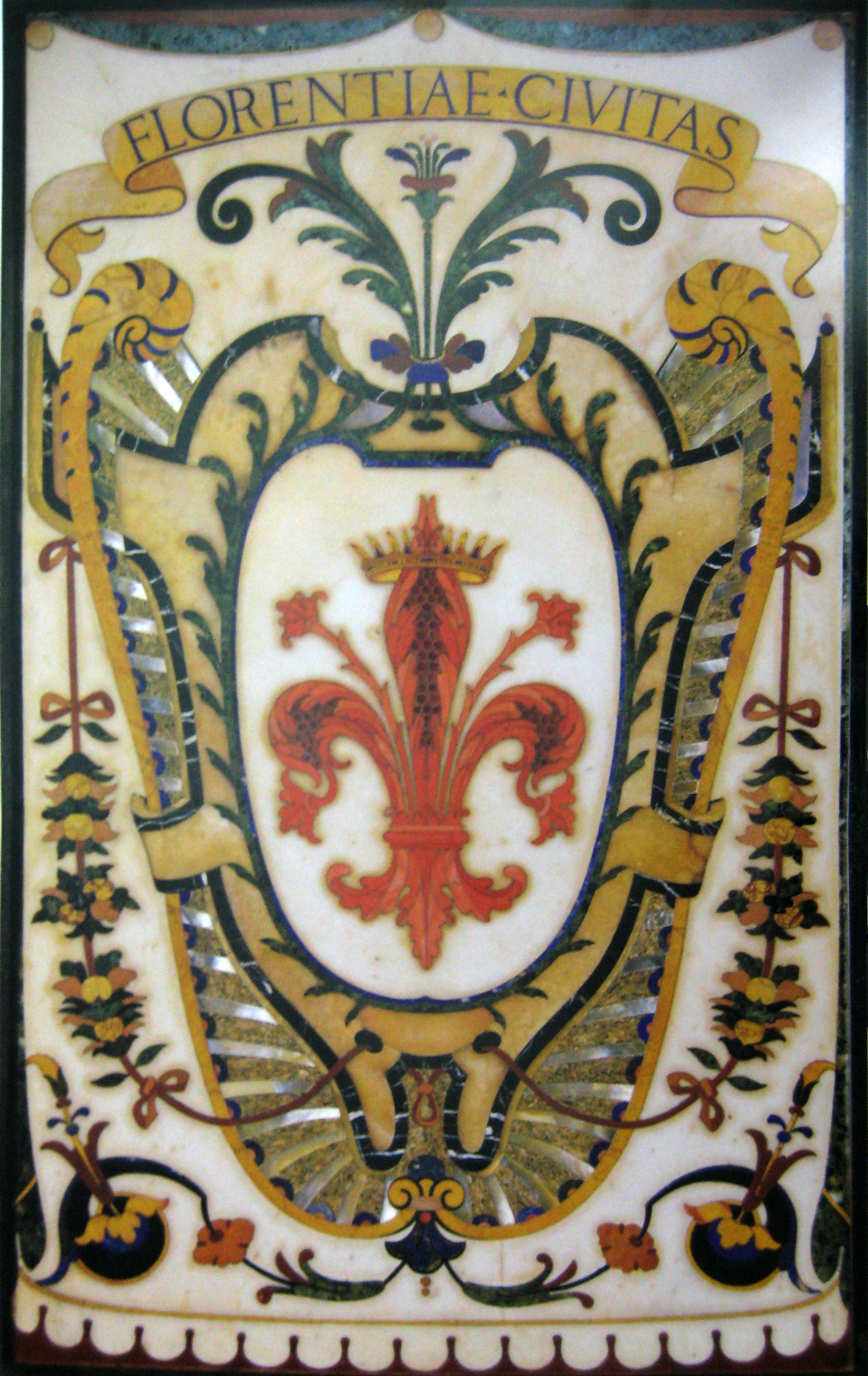
Inlay of the coat of arms of Florence

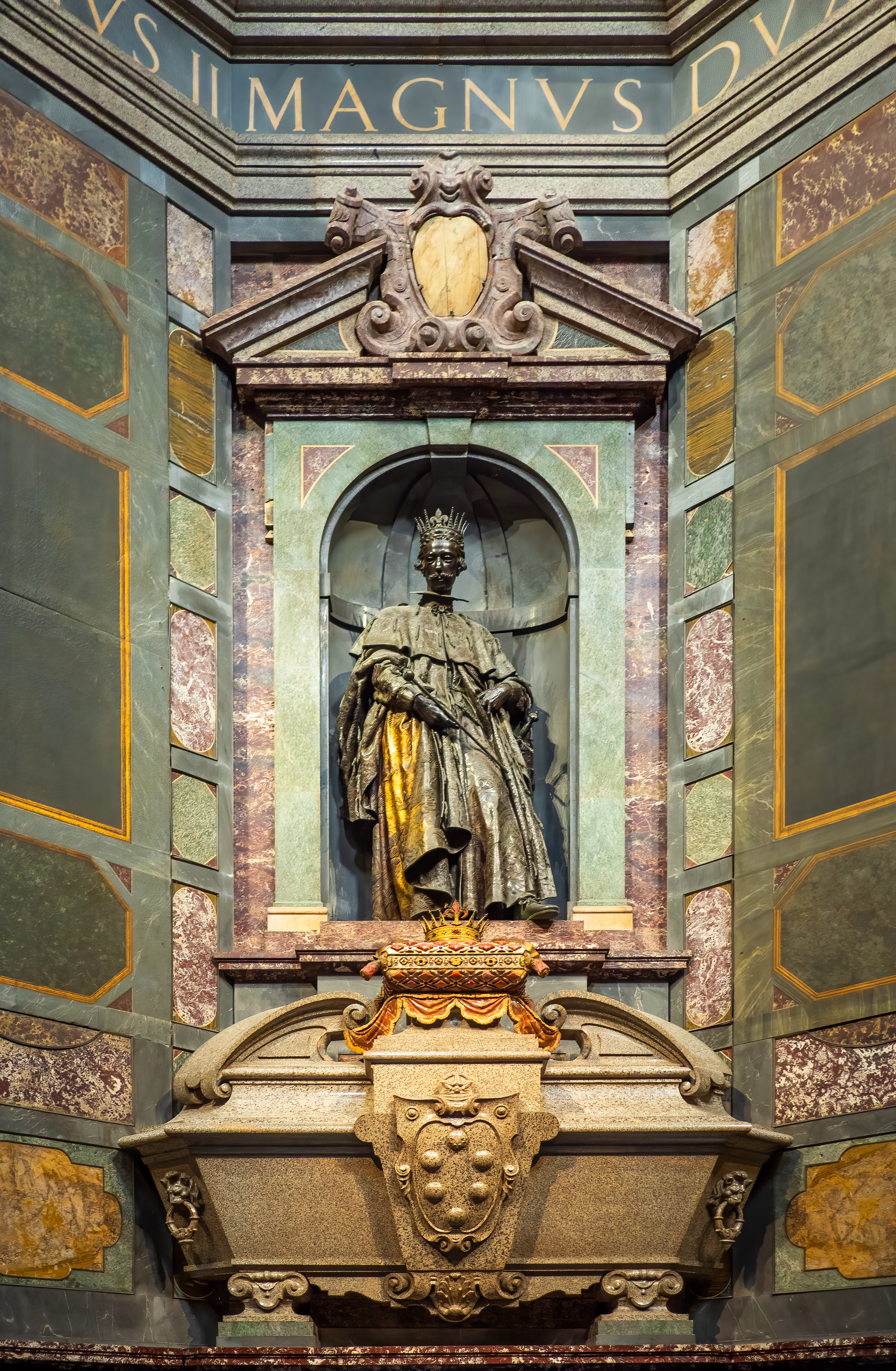
Statue and sarcophagus of Cosimo II de' Medici

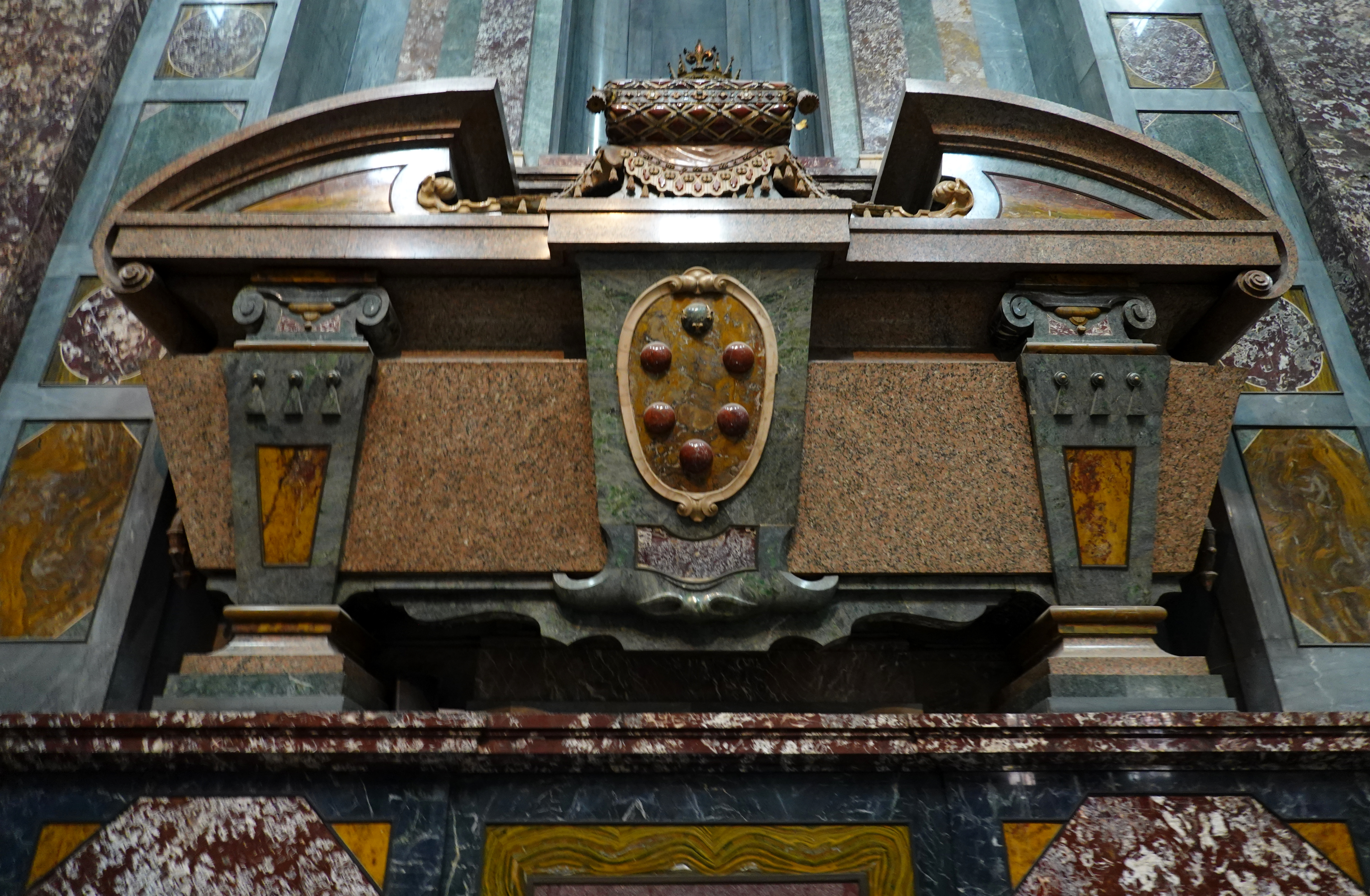
Sarcophagus of Cosimo III de' Medici

== See also ==
- List of rulers of Tuscany
