= Don Giovanni de' Medici =

Italian military commander and diplomat (1567–1621)

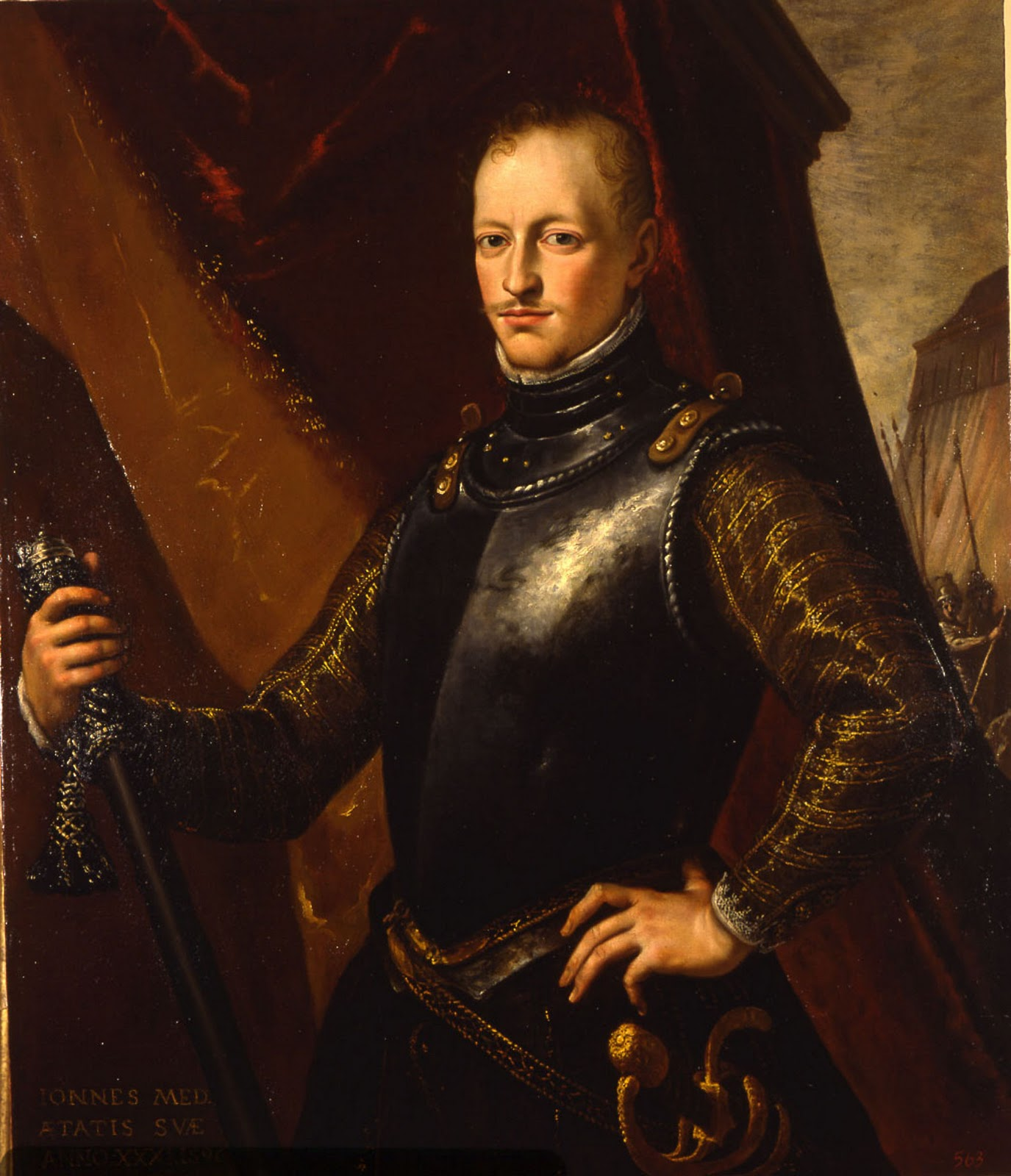
Don Giovanni de' Medici.

Don Giovanni de' Medici (13 May 1567, in Florence – 19 July 1621, in Murano) was an Italian military commander, diplomat and architect.

Medici was born the illegitimate son of Cosimo I de' Medici, Grand Duke of Tuscany and Eleonora degli Albizzi. Medici was later legitimated by his father.

He was born 5 years after the death of his brother, Giovanni, and was given the same name. He moved to Spain where he began his military career.

In 1598 he was a Grandee of Spain and Florentine ambassador in Madrid. In 1600 he was Master of the Field for the Imperial army, but his most important appointment was as Commander-in-Chief of the army of the Republic of Venice (1616–1617).

He married Livia del Vernazza, with whom he had two sons; Gianfrancesco Maria (1619–1689) and another that was born posthumously but died as an infant.

Giovanni was also a painter and an architect, and collaborated with Matteo Nigetti in the design of the Cappella dei Principi for the church of San Lorenzo in Florence. On his return home he caught the smallpox at Padova. He died at Murano in 1621.

== Patron of the arts ==
Don Giovanni took special care in dealing with artists, he was an architect, he designed the construction of the Chapel of the Princes and the Church of San Lorenzo, but he also had a special relationship with the commedia dell'arte, in fact from 1612 to 1621 he oversaw relations with the comedy troupe of Confidenti, with whom he had extensive correspondence with famous comedians Flaminio Scala and Nicholas Barbieri Beltrame in art, as with other patrons such as Gonzaga and the owners of theatres in which Confidenti had to act.
