= Princess Leopoldina of Savoy =

Leopoldina
- Princess of Melfi
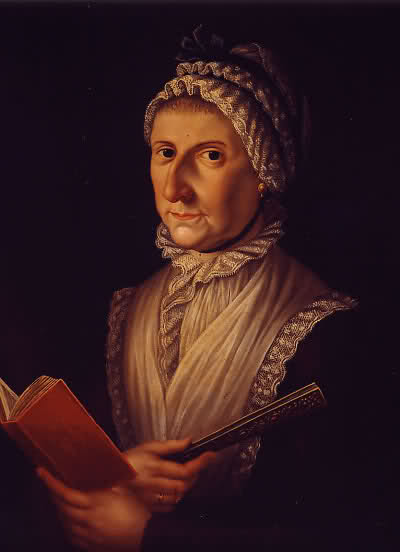
- Born: 21 December 1744; Palazzo Carignano, Turin, Kingdom of Sardinia
- Died: 17 April 1807 (aged 62); Palazzo Doria Pamphilj, Rome, Papal States
- Spouse: Andrea IV Doria-Pamphilj-Landi (m. 1767)
- Issue: Luigi, Prince of Valmontore; Eugenia, Princess of Avellino
Names
- Leopoldina Maria di Savoia
- House: Savoy-Carignano
- Father: Louis Victor, Prince of Carignano
- Mother: Princess Christine of Hesse-Rotenburg

Princess Leopoldina of Savoy (Leopoldina Maria; 21 December 1744 – 17 April 1807) was a Princess of Savoy and later the Princess of Melfi as the wife of Giovanni Andrea VI Doria-Pamphilj-Landi, (13) Prince of Melfi. She was the older sister of the princesse de Lamballe.

== Biography ==
Leopoldina Maria, Princess of Savoy was born at the Palazzo Carignano in Turin, the capital of the Kingdom of Sardinia. She was the third child of ten, she was her parents' second daughter.

Her father Louis Victor of Savoy was the Prince of Carignano and head of the cadet branch of the House of Savoy which ruled over Sardinia. Her mother was a daughter of the Landgrave of Hesse-Rotenburg and was a sister of the late Queen Polyxena of Sardinia, wife of King Charles Emmanuel III. As such, Charles Emmanuel's children were Leopoldina's first cousins including the future King Victor Amadeus III.

She received a good education and was fluent in French, Italian, and German. Her brothers included Victor Amadeus II, Prince of Carignano, grandfather of King Charles Albert of Sardinia. Her younger brother was Eugenio, Count of Villafranca, founder of the Villafranca line of the Princes of Carignano.

The second of six daughters, her most famous sister was Maria Luisa of Savoy, future wife of Louis Alexandre de Bourbon and friend of Marie Antoinette and immortalised as the princesse de Lamballe. Her other sisters included Princes Charlotte who was a nun; Princess Caterina who married a Colonna, and was the Princess of Paliano by marriage. Another was Princess Gabrielle who married into the House of Lobkowicz.

She was married to Andrea IV Doria-Pamphilj-Landi, a member of the wealthy Doria-Pamphilj-Landi who were of Genoese origin. Andrea IV who was a frequent at the court at the Royal Palace of Turin and the Castle of Racconigi, the latter of which was a personal residence of the Princes of Carignano. Leopoldina married the Prince of Melfi on 6 May 1767 and arrived in Rome on 20 June 1767.

Once in Rome, her husband established them in the Palazzo Doria Pamphilj, present site of Doria Pamphilj Gallery in Rome. She died there in 1807 aged 62. The present Doria-Pamphilj-Landi descend from her.

== Issue ==
- Donna Anna Doria-Pamphilj-Landi (15 November 1770 – 1835) married Marchese Giovanni Battista Serra, no issue;
- Don Don Luigi Doria-Pamphili-Landi, Prince of Valmontore (24 October 1779 – 26 January 1838) married Donna Teresa Orsini and had issue;
- Donna Eugenia Doria-Pamphilj-Landi (1 June 1786 – 23 July 1841) married Don Marino Francesco Caracciolo, Prince of Avellino and had issue.
