= Prince Eugenio Emanuele, Count of Villafranca =

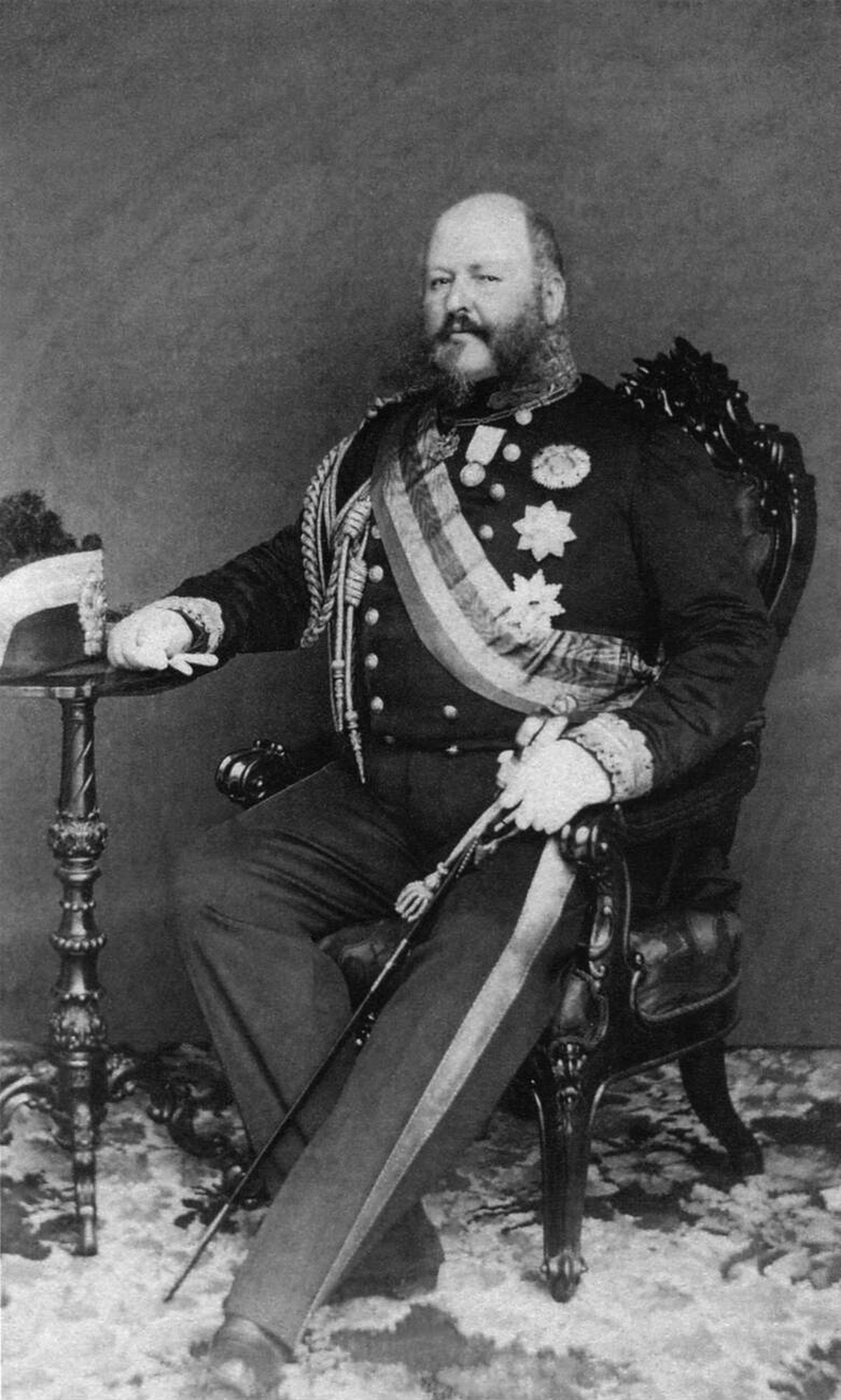
Eugenio di Savoia-Carignano in 1861.

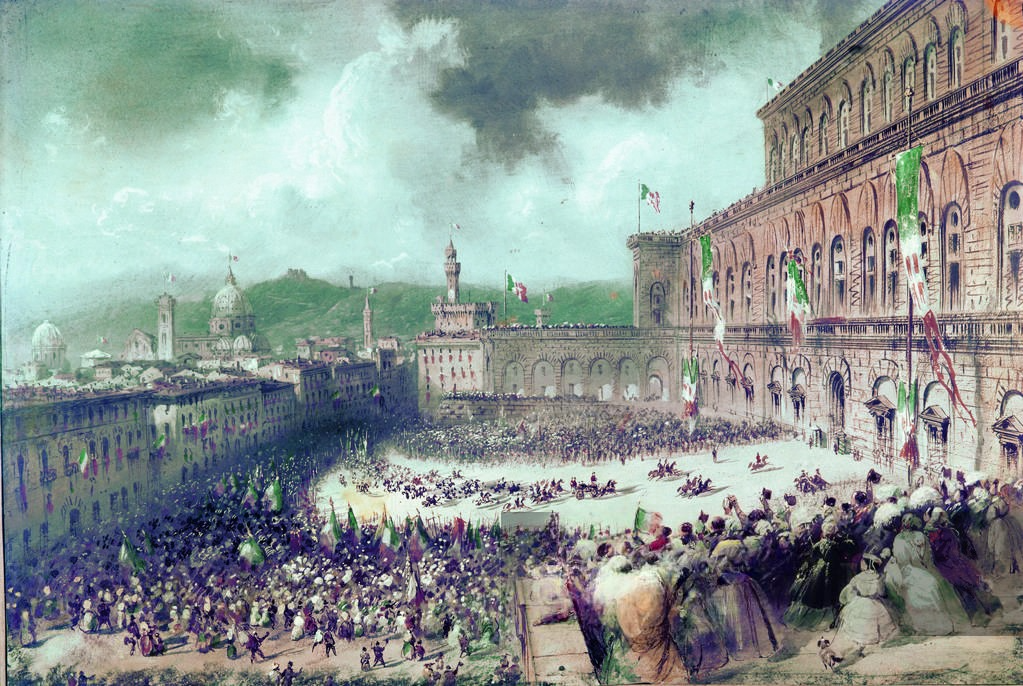
Eugenio di Savoia-Carignano arrives at the Palazzo Pitti in Firenze as Lieutenant General in 1866.

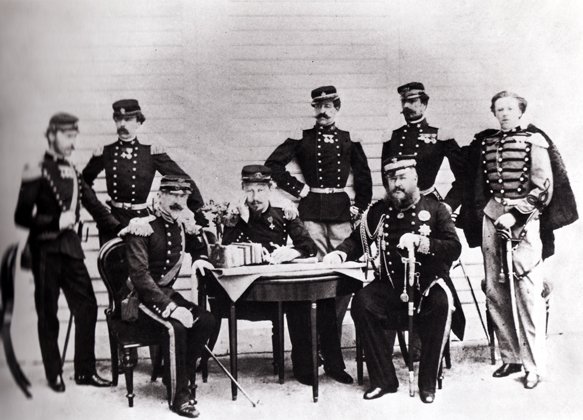
Eugenio di Savoia-Carignano with his staff at the Siege of Gaeta (1861).

Prince Eugene Emmanuel of Savoy-Carignano, Count of Villafranca (Paris, 14 April 1816 – Turin, 15 December 1888) was a statesman and military leader for Piedmont–Sardinia and later for the Kingdom of Italy.

== Biography ==
He was a son of Joseph Marie de Savoie-Carignan (1783–1825), a close relative of King Charles Albert of Sardinia, and his wife, Pauline Antoinette de Quélen de Stuer de Caussade (1783–1829), daughter of French Ambassador Paul François de Quélen de Stuer de Caussade and Antoinette de Pons. His elder sister was Princess Maria Filiberta of Savoy and his grandfather was Prince Eugenio, Count of Villafranca.

He graduated from the Royal Naval School in Genoa, after which he joined the navy as an officer. In the summer of 1834, with the rank of lieutenant, he transferred from the navy to the army, initially to the Piedmont cavalry. By 1836 he had become a colonel, and in 1844, a lieutenant general. In parallel, he continued to be listed in the navy, and was eventually promoted to admiral.

Somewhat earlier, in 1842, the prince tried to marry Brazilian Princess Januária of Brazil, but was refused. In 1843, he tried to marry the Austrian princess Maria Carolina, daughter of Archduke Rainer of Austria, but she died the following year, before the marriage was concluded. The loss of his future bride plunged the prince into complete despair, and for many years after that, he did not want to marry, even when the King offered him advantageous matches.

However, twenty years later he finally married a 19-year-old ballerina of relatively simple origin, named Felicite Crosio (1844–1911). From this marriage, eight children were born, who were granted all rights to the lands and titles (but not the princely title and rank) of their father by decision of King Umberto, despite the fact that their parents' marriage was morganatic.

=== Italian Wars of Independence ===
Prince Eugene Emmanuel participated in several military actions during the Wars for the Unification of Italy (1848–1871). Charles Albert appointed Eugene as commander general of the Navy of the Kingdom of Sardinia between 1844–48 and 1849–51.
Four times during the war (1848, 1849, 1859, 1866), he held the Lieutenancy of the Kingdom. He was the regent of the United Provinces of Central Italy in Tuscany (March 1860) and Lieutenant in Naples (January 1861).

In 1861, he distinguished himself in the Siege of Gaeta, which was defended by supporters of the King of the Two Sicilies, Francis II.

After the unification of Italy, he presided over the General Commission for the Defense of the State, the National Consortium, the National Shooting Range and many other associations of various kinds. He died in Turin on 15 December 1888.

He received the Spanish Order of the Golden Fleece during the short Spanish reign of his cousin Amadeus I, as well as several other awards.

== Ancestry ==
Ancestors of Prince Eugenio Emanuele, Count of Villafranca

8. Louis Victor, Prince of Carignano
4. Prince Eugenio, Count of Villafranca
9. Princess Christine of Hesse-Rotenburg
2. Joseph Marie de Savoie-Carignan, Count of Villafranca
10. Jean François Nicolas Magon de Boisgarin
5. Élisabeth Anne Magon de Boisgarin
11. Louise de Caruel
1. Prince Eugenio Emanuele, Count of Villafranca
12. Antoine de Quélen de Stuer de Caussade, duc de La Vauguyon
6. Paul François de Quélen de Stuer de Caussade, duc de La Vauguyon
13. Marie Françoise de Béthune
3. Pauline Antoinette de Quélen de Stuer de Caussade
14. Charles Armand de Pons, comte de Roquefort
7. Antoinette de Pons
15. Rosalie Le Tonnelier de Breteuil
