= Princess Maria Filiberta of Savoy =

Maria Filiberta of Savoy
- Countess of Syracuse
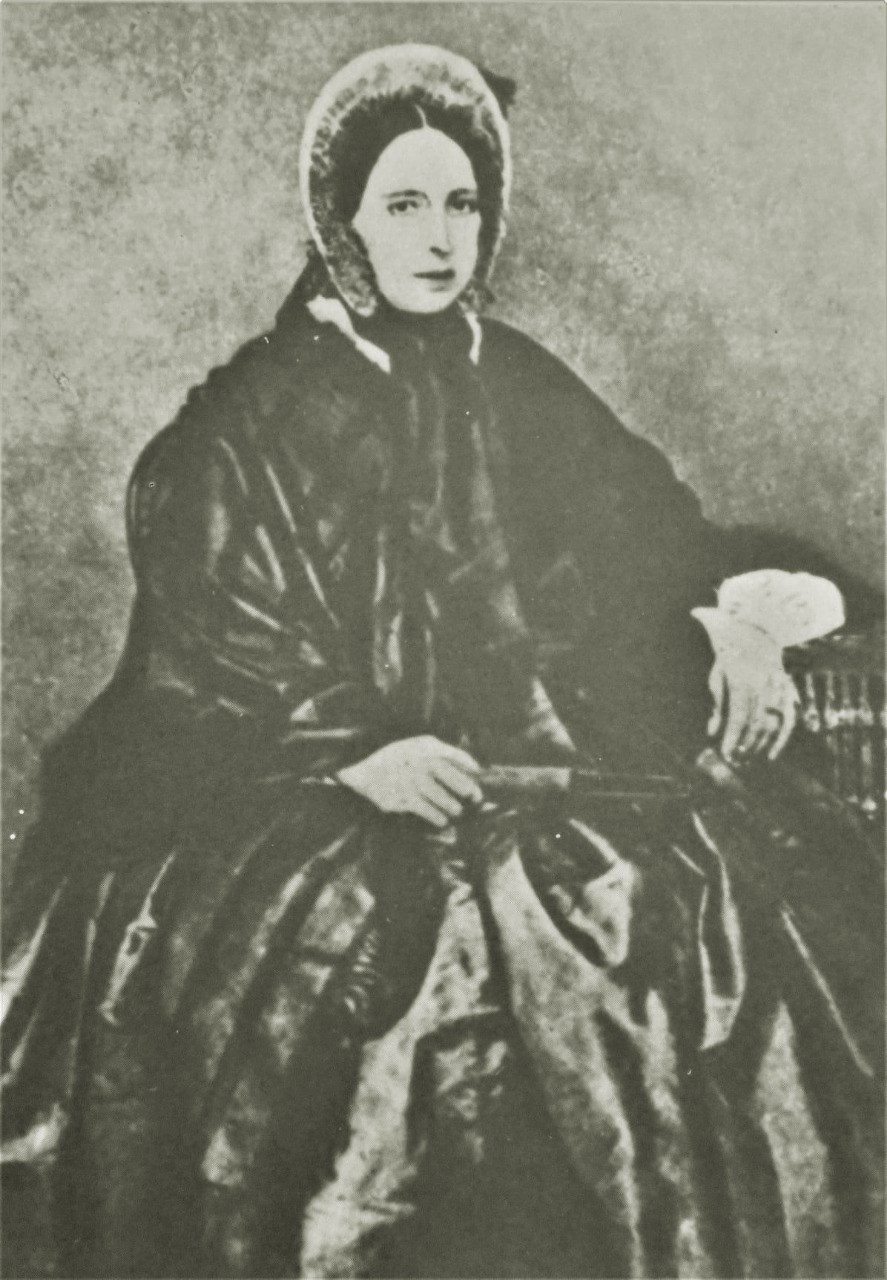
- Photograph of Maria Filiberta, c. 1870
- Born: 29 September 1814; Boulogne-sur-Mer
- Died: 2 January 1874 (aged 59); Naples
- Burial: Basilica of Santa Chiara, Naples
- Spouse: Prince Leopold, Count of Syracuse (m. 1837; died 1860)
- Issue: Princess Isabella
Names
- Maria Vittoria Filiberta di Savoia
- House: Savoy-Carignano (by birth); Bourbon-Two Sicilies (by marriage)
- Father: Joseph Marie de Savoie-Carignan, Count of Villafranca
- Mother: Pauline Antoinette de Quélen de Stuer de Caussade

Maria Filiberta of Savoy (Maria Vittoria Filiberta; 29 September 1814 – 2 January 1874) was a Princess of Savoy by royal decree and later a Princess of the Two Sicilies by virtue of her marriage to Prince Leopold of Two Sicilies, Count of Syracuse, younger son of King Francis I of the Two Sicilies and his second wife, Infanta María Isabella of Spain.

== Early life and ancestry ==
Maria Vittoria Filiberta was the second child and second-eldest daughter of Joseph Marie de Savoie-Carignan, son of Prince Eugenio, Count of Villafranca, nephew of the Princesse de Lamballe, member of a Savoy-Villafranca cadet line of the House of Savoy-Carignano, a cadet line of the most senior House of Savoy.

Her mother was Pauline Antoinette de Quélen de Stuer de Caussade, the youngest daughter of Paul François de Quélen de Stuer de Caussade, Duke of La Vauguyon, French ambassador to Spain and Minister of Foreign Affairs, by his wife, Antoinette de Pons, Première femme de Chambre to Marie Joséphine of Savoy, Countess of Provence, maternal granddaughter of François Victor Le Tonnelier de Breteuil, Chancellor of France, Keeper of the Seals of France and two times Minister of war during the reign of Louis XV.

Her brother was Prince Eugenio Emanuele, Count of Villafranca.

== Marriage and issue ==
In 1837, Maria married Prince Leopold of the Two Sicilies, known as the Count of Syracuse, member of the House of Bourbon-Two Sicilies. The count was the fifth son of Francis I of the Two Sicilies and Infanta Maria Isabel of Spain. Maria Filiberta and Leopold were married on 16 June 1837 in Naples. Maria and Leopold had one daughter who died just a day after her birth:

- Princess Isabella of the Two Sicilies (Naples, 23 March 1838 – Naples, 24 March 1838)

== Death ==
Princess Maria Filiberta died in Naples on 2 January 1874, at the age of 59. She is buried alongside her husband, Prince Leopold and her daughter, Princess Isabella and other deceased members of the House of Bourbon Two-Sicilies in Santa Chiara, Naples, Italy.
