= Eugenio, Count of Villafranca =

Prince Eugenio
- Count of Villafranca
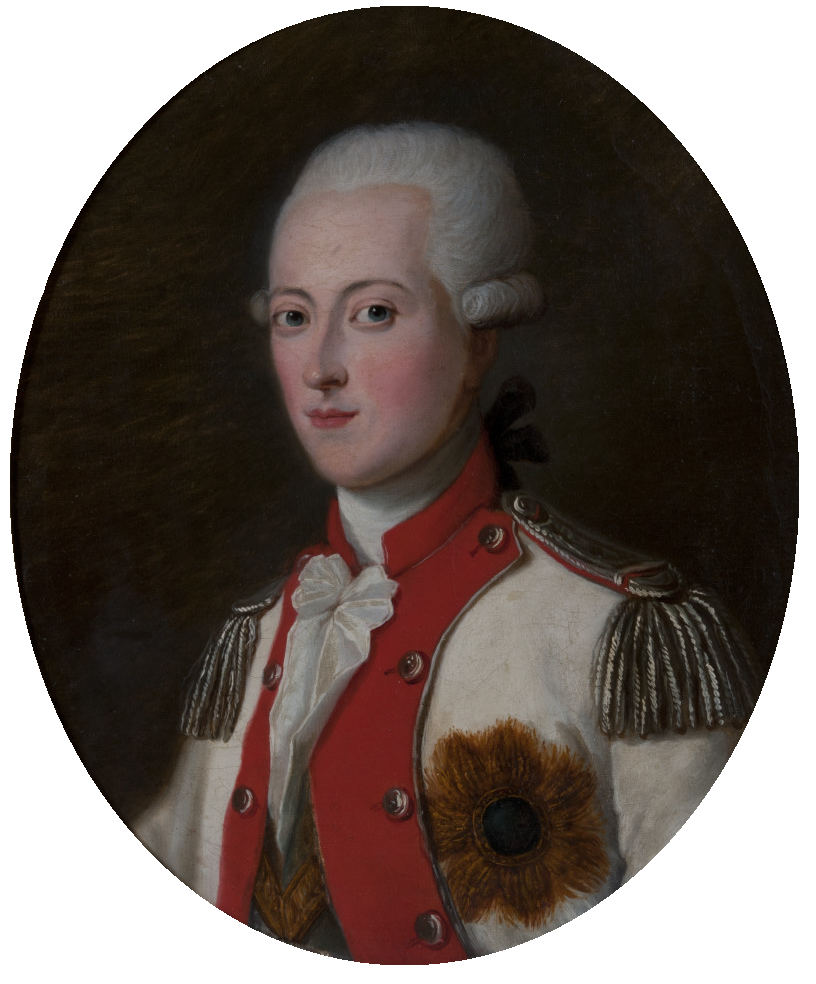
- Portrait by unknown, c. 1773–1785
- Born: 21 October 1753; Palazzo Carignano, Turin, Kingdom of Sardinia
- Died: 30 June 1785 (aged 31); Domart, Picardy, France
- Spouse: Élisabeth Anne Magon de Boisgarin (m. 1779)
Names
- Eugenio Ilarione di Savoia
- House: Savoy-Carignano
- Father: Louis Victor, Prince of Carignano
- Mother: Princess Christine of Hesse-Rotenburg

Eugenio of Savoy (Eugenio Ilarione; 21 October 1753 – 30 June 1785) was a prince of the House of Savoy and founder of the Villafranca branch of the royal family of Italy that survived until 1888. He was the brother of Queen Marie Antoinette's tragic confidante, the Princesse de Lamballe.

== Biography ==
Born in Turin, he was the next to youngest of the nine children of Louis Victor of Savoy, Prince of Carignano and his German wife, Christine of Hesse-Rheinfels-Rotenburg. Although their family seat was the principality of Carignano 20 kilometers south of Turin, of which they were nominally suzerains, as princes of the blood royal in the Kingdom of Sardinia, the Savoy-Carignanos were in attendance at the royal court of the Savoys in Turin, while also maintaining a residence in Paris and frequenting the French court.

In addition to being a cousin in the first degree of Victor Amadeus III of Sardinia and of Louis Joseph of Bourbon, Prince de Condé, Eugènio's sister Maria Teresa (1749-1792) had married Louis Alexandre de Bourbon, Prince de Lamballe, the heir of a legitimised branch of the French royal family when he was 13, and had become the close friend and Surintendante of the French queen, Marie Antoinette of Austria, by 1775. As his elder brother, Victor Amadeus, was heir to the Carignano princedom, the traditional occupations for a younger son of a princely house, an episcopal or military sinecure, beckoned him to the French court. Upon reaching adulthood, he assumed a family title, Count of Villafranca, and obtained a commission in the French army service as proprietary colonel of the Villefranche Regiment, and was known there as "Prince Eugène, comte de Villefranche".

While stationed in Saint-Malo, on 29 December 1779 the 26 year-old prince secretly married 14 year-old Elisabeth Anne Magon de Boisgarin, the daughter of François Nicolas Magon, Seigneur de Boigarin, and his wife Louise de Caruel. After the wedding, held probably in the Boisgarin parish of Spézet in the Finistère, the bride assumed the title, Countess de Pommeryt. The marriage evoked a scandal, a lawsuit (conducted over many years by the renowned attorney, Lacretelle the Elder) and, eventually, an annulment ("for not having observed all the formalities prescribed by the civil and military laws of the kingdom") registered by the Parlement of Paris at the behest of Eugène's parents, as well as the Kings of Sardinia and France, who objected to his elopement with the daughter of a family only ennobled since 1695, whose wealth derived from a prosperous apothecary ancestor.

As the bridegroom persisted in his determination to wed Mlle de Boisgarin, Louis XVI relented, and King Victor Amadeus III issued a royal decree in September 1780 requiring consent of the head of the house for the marriage of princes of the blood, and morganatising marriages for brides of "inferior condition or status", whether wed with or without the royal assent. On 22 February 1781 the marriage was again solemnized at Saint-Méloir-des-Ondes, Brittany in accordance with the new Savoyard house law. Thus, the marriage, being approved in advance, was legal in Sardinia and Eugène did not thereby forfeit his own dynastic rights or princely title, but his wife and future descendants of the marriage were not recognized as members of the House of Savoy nor as in the line of succession to the throne, although allowed to bear the Savoy surname and to retain the Villafranca countship. The Sardinian king granted the couple an annual allowance of 24,000 livres, supplemented by 44,000 from the French king which, combined with Villefranche's resources yielded an annual income of 100,000 lives.

The only child born of this union, a son known as the Chevalier de Savoie, inherited Eugène's property when he died in his castle at Domart, Picardy, aged 31. In addition to King Louis designating his finance minister, Breteuil, to be his tutor, the young chevalier was allowed a 15,000 livres allowance, while his widowed mother was given a 6,000 livre pension. Despite the Parisian mob's murder of his aunt, the Princesse de Lamballe, after the French Revolution he was made a page at the court of Napoleon I in 1812, became a colonel of the Hussars 2nd Regiment, and was promoted to lieutenant general during the Restoration. The chevalier's son, Eugenio (1816-1888), lived to be designated "heir presumptive to the throne of Italy in the event of extinction of the reigning branch" in 1834. Prince Eugène's Villafranca descent, although made into a dynasty in 1834, survives as the once-again morganatic Villafranca line, headed by Edoardo, Count of Villafranca-Soissons.

== Issue ==
- Giuseppe Maria (Joseph-Marie), Chevalier de Savoie, Count of Villafranca, Baron of the Empire (30 October 1783 – 15 October 1825) married 29 October 1810 Pauline Antoinette de Quélen de Stuer de Caussade (17 May 1784 – 10 February 1829), daughter of Paul François de Quélen de Stuer de Caussade, and had issue:
  - Maria Gabriella (18 September 1811 – 10 September 1837), recognized as Princess Maria Gabriella of Savoy-Carignano on 28 April 1834, married 1827 Vittorio Emanuele Massimo, 2nd Prince of Arsoli (1803–1873), and had issue, two daughters and one son.
  - Maria Filiberta (29 September 1814 – 20 January 1874), recognized as Princess Maria Filiberta of Savoy-Carignano on 28 April 1834, married 1837 Prince Leopoldo of the Two Sicilies, Count of Syracuse (1813–1860), and had issue, one daughter.
  - Eugenio Emanuele (14 April 1816 – 15 December 1888), Count of Villafranca, recognized as Prince Eugenio Emanuele of Savoy-Carignano and created Prince of Carignano on 28 April 1834, and HRH on 29 March 1849, married morganatically on 25 November 1863 Felicita Crosio (1844–1911), created hereditary Countess of Villafranca-Soissons on 14 September 1888, and they have living descendants.

== Ancestry ==
Ancestors of Eugenio, Count of Villafranca

8. Emmanuel Philibert, Prince of Carignano
4. Victor Amadeus I, Prince of Carignano
9. Princess Maria Caterina of Modena
2. Louis Victor, Prince of Carignano
10. Victor Amadeus II of Sardinia
5. Maria Vittoria, Marquise of Susa
11. Jeanne Baptiste d'Albert de Luynes
1. Prince Eugenio, Count of Villafranca
12. William I, Landgrave of Hesse-Rotenburg
6. Ernest II Leopold, Landgrave of Hesse-Rotenburg
13. Countess Maria Anna of Löwenstein-Wertheim-Rochefort
3. Princess Christine of Hesse-Rotenburg
14. Maximilian Karl Albert, Prince of Löwenstein-Wertheim-Rochefort
7. Countess Eleonore of Löwenstein-Wertheim-Rochefort
15. Countess Polyxena Maria Khuen von Lichtenberg und Belasi
