= Princess Leopoldine =

Princess Leopoldine or Princess Leopoldina may refer to:

- Princess Leopoldine of Baden (1837–1903), wife of Hermann, Prince of Hohenlohe-Langenburg
- Princess Leopoldine Marie of Anhalt-Dessau (1716–1782), daughter of Leopold I, Prince of Anhalt-Dessau
- Leopoldine von Sternberg, (1733–1809), wife of Franz Joseph I of Liechtenstein
- Princess Leopoldina of Brazil (1847–1871), daughter of Pedro II of Brazil
- Princess Leopoldina of Savoy (1744–1807), daughter of Louis Victor, Prince of Carignano
