= Prince Leopoldo, Count of Syracuse =

Prince Leopold
- Count of Syracuse
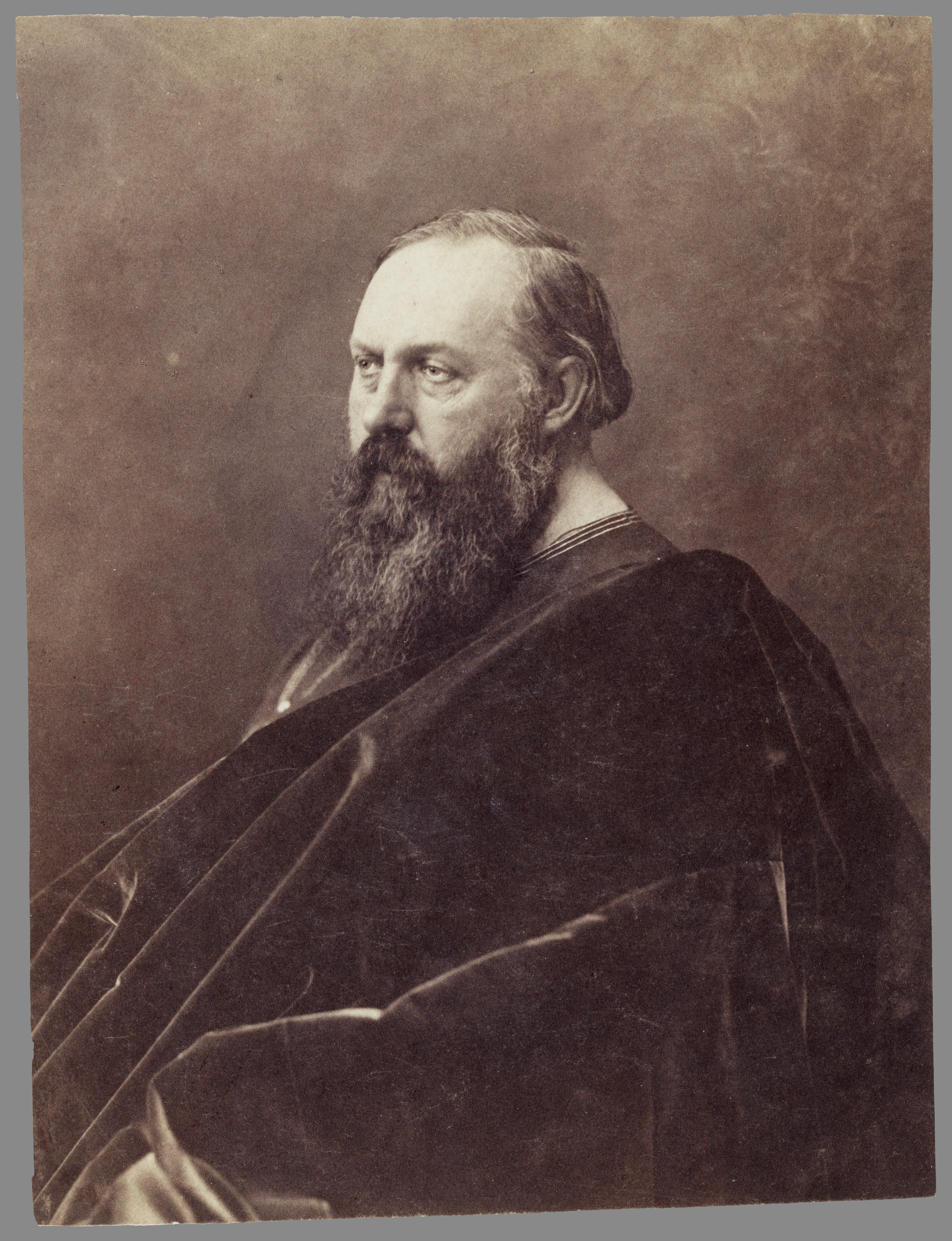
- Portrait by Nadar, 1858
- Born: 22 May 1813; Palermo
- Died: 4 December 1860 (aged 47); Pisa
- Burial: Basilica of Santa Chiara
- Spouse: Princess Maria Filiberta of Savoy (m. 1837)
- Issue: Princess Maria Isabella
Names
- Italian: Leopoldo Beniamino Giuseppe
- House: Bourbon-Two Sicilies
- Father: Francis I of the Two Sicilies
- Mother: Maria Isabella of Spain

Prince Leopold of the Two Sicilies (22 May 1813, in Palermo – 4 December 1860, in Pisa) was a prince of the Two Sicilies and was known as the Count of Syracuse.

== Life ==
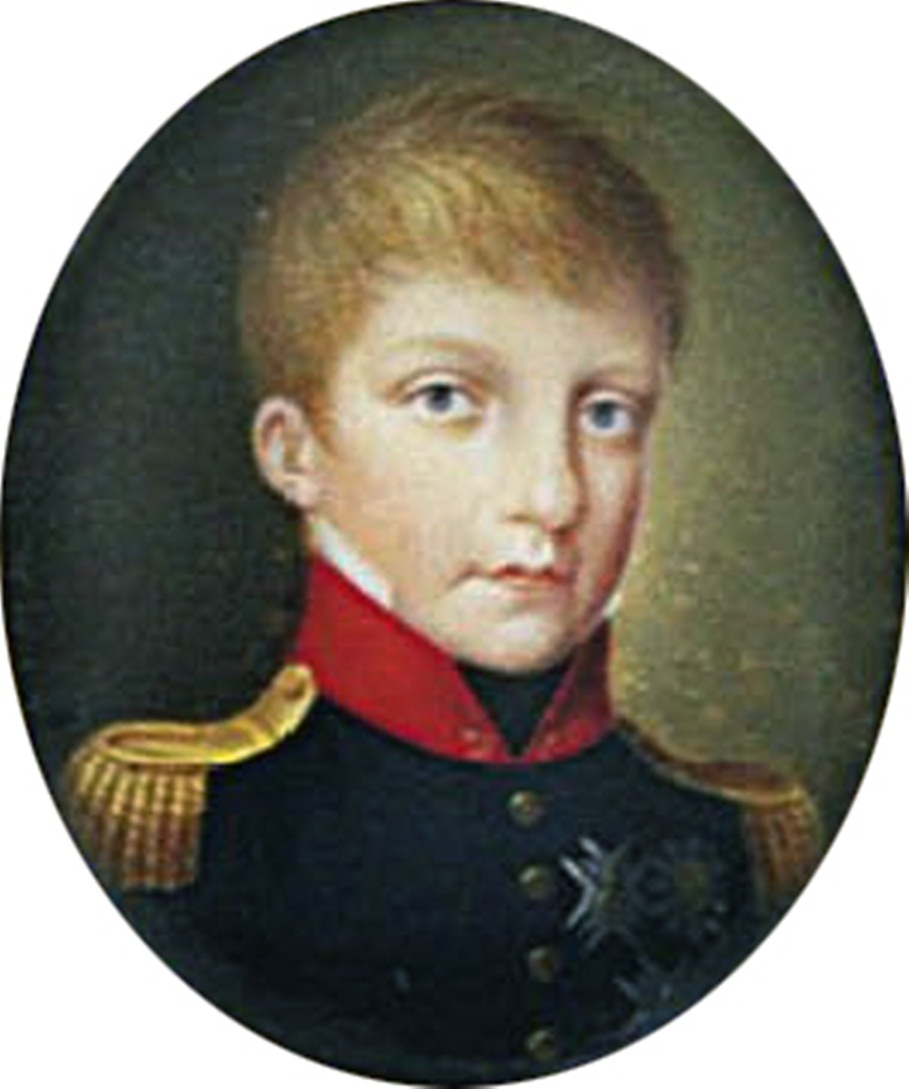
Portrait c.1825

Leopold was the third son of Francis I of the Two Sicilies and his second wife, Maria Isabella of Spain. In 1816, at the creation of the kingdom of the Two Sicilies, when he was three years old, he was given the title of Count of Syracuse.

At his father's death in November 1830, Leopold's elder brother, Ferdinand II of the Two Sicilies, named him Lieutenant general in Sicily. As governor in Palermo, he introduced important reforms. Fearing his popularity and the desire of Sicily for independence, he was recalled from his position in early 1835. In April of the same year, he was sent to travel abroad.

Ferdinand II considered a marriage between Leopold and his cousin Princess Marie of Orléans, but the negotiations with her father, Louis-Philippe of France, foundered over the French uprisings in 1834 and Louis-Philippe's refusal to grant Marie her part of the "donation-partage" of his lands (a condition Ferdinand had put in place for the marriage to occur). Leopold was an artist, a skillful sculptor and patron of the arts. He lacked great ambition, preferring to lead a life of pleasure.

Leopold married Princess Maria Filiberta of Savoy, second-eldest daughter of Giuseppe Maria di Savoia-Carignano, Count of Villafranca (son of Eugenio), and his wife Pauline Antoinette de Quélen de Stuer de Caussade, on 16 June 1837 in Naples. They were ill-matched and their marriage was unhappy. He was an agnostic and liberal. She was conservative and religious, with nothing in common with him. They managed to have only one child, Maria Isabella, who died less than a year after her birth in 1838. From then on they lived separate lives. She retired to live a religious life in almost seclusion at her palace of Chiaia.

The Count of Syracuse lived abroad between 1846 and 1850. In spite of his opposed political tendencies, he was Ferdinand II's favorite brother. When he suffered a stroke in 1854, the king was deeply distressed. The Count recovered. Like his brothers, the counts of Aquila and Trapani, he was a womanizer, but he was not involved in scandals and his brother the King paid his debts regarding him as a lovable black sheep. He was an hedonistic man described as "large, powerful, with a handsome countenance" Simple in his manners, he was widely popular. He surrounded himself with a court of artists, writers and musicians, who followed him from his palace on the Chiaia to his villa at Sorrento.

After the death of Ferdinand II in May 1859, the Count of Syracuse advocated a close alliance with Piedmont. He had a low opinion of his nephew, Francis II, the new king. Their relationship was cold. In April 1860, Leopold urged his nephew Francis II to make liberal concessions. After few months, he went to Piedmont. He died shortly after in Pisa.

== Ancestry ==
Ancestors of Prince Leopoldo, Count of Syracuse

8. Charles III of Spain (= 12)
4. Ferdinand I of the Two Sicilies
9. Maria Amalia of Saxony (= 13)
2. Francis I of the Two Sicilies
10. Francis I, Holy Roman Emperor
5. Maria Carolina of Austria
11. Maria Theresa of Austria
1. Prince Leopold, Count of Siracusa
12. Charles III of Spain (= 8)
6. Charles IV of Spain
13. Maria Amalia of Saxony (= 9)
3. Maria Isabella of Spain
14. Philip, Duke of Parma
7. Maria Luisa of Parma
15. Louise Élisabeth of France
