= Louis Victor, Prince of Carignano =

Louis Victor of Savoy
- Prince of Carignano
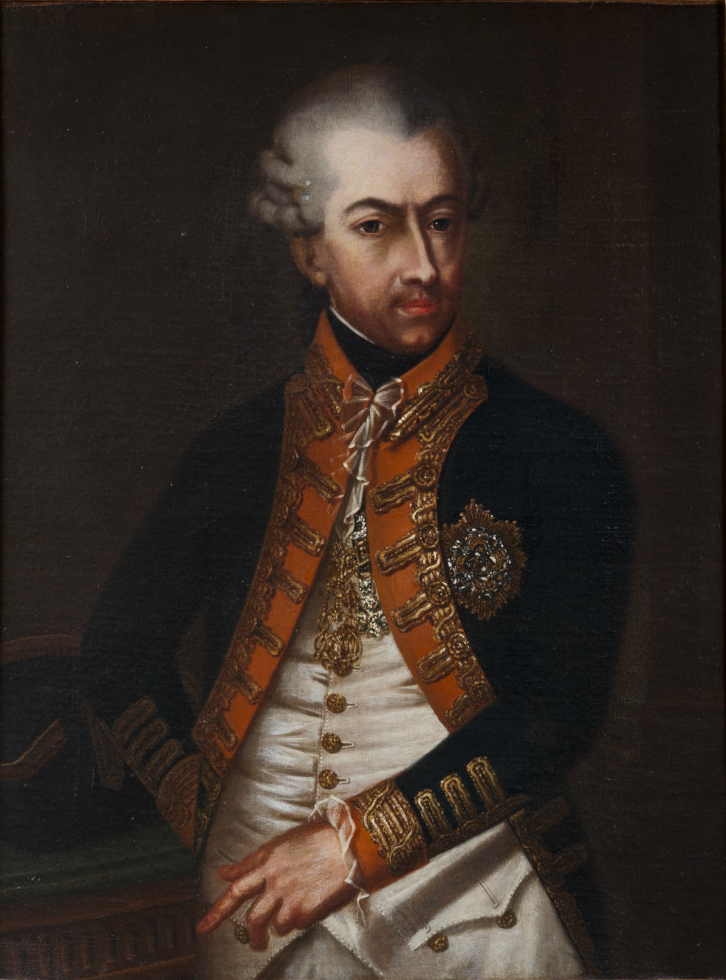

Prince of Carignano
- Reign: 4 April 1741 – 16 December 1778
- Predecessor: Victor Amadeus I
- Successor: Victor Amadeus II
- Born: 25 September 1721; Hôtel de Soissons, Paris, France
- Died: 16 December 1778 (aged 57); Palazzo Carignano, Turin, Italy
- Spouse: Christine of Hesse-Rotenburg (m. 1740; died 1778)
- Issue Detail: Princess Carlotta; Victor Amadeus, Prince of Carignano; Leopoldina, Princess of Melfi; Princess Polyxena; Gabriella, Princess of Lobkowicz; Marie Louise, Princess of Lamballe; Caterina, Princess of Paliano; Eugenio, Count of Villafranca
Names
- Luigi Vittorio di Savoia
- House: Savoy (Carignano branch)
- Father: Victor Amadeus I
- Mother: Maria Vittoria, légitimée di Savoia

Louis Victor of Savoy, 4th Prince of Carignano (25 September 1721 – 16 December 1778) headed a cadet branch of the Italian dynasty which reigned over the Kingdom of Sardinia, being known as the Prince of Carignano from 1741 until his death. Upon extinction of the senior line of the family, his great-grandson succeeded to the royal throne as King Charles Albert of Sardinia, while his great-great-grandson, Victor Emmanuel II, became King of Italy.

== Early life ==
Louis Victor was born at the Hôtel de Soissons, the Parisian home of his ancestor Marie de Bourbon, Countess of Soissons, to Victor Amadeus I, Prince of Carignano and his wife Maria Vittoria di Savoia. His father was a grandson of Thomas Francis, Prince of Carignano and thus a descendant of Charles Emmanuel I, Duke of Savoy and Infanta Catherine Michelle of Spain. He was doubly descended from the latter pair, as his mother was a legitimated daughter of Victor Amadeus II of Sardinia and his mistress Jeanne Baptiste d'Albert de Luynes.

One of five children, he was the second son of his parents; his older brother Joseph Victor died an infant in 1716. Louis Victor was thus heir to the Carignano cadet branch of the House of Savoy from birth. His older sister Anne Thérèse married the Frenchman Charles de Rohan and was Princess of Soubise by marriage. Anne Thérèse was the mother of Madame de Guéméné, official governess to the children of Marie Antoinette and Louis XVI.

== Career ==
Louis Victor grew up in Paris, where his father was both a courtier and an inveterate gambler. Heavily in debt in Piedmont, and sued by his sisters whose dowries he had gambled away, he had fled to France where he lived so luxurious a life that his son was forced to sell significant family assets in that country. He later moved to Piedmont, between Turin and Racconigi.

In 1741, Louis Victor's father died and he became the Prince of Carignano. The fief of Carignano had belonged to the Savoys since 1418, but the fact that it was part of Piedmont, only twenty km south of Turin, meant that it could be a "princedom" for Thomas in name only, being endowed neither with independence nor revenues of substance.

== Personal life ==
On 4 May 1740, Louis Victor married Princess Christine of Hesse-Rheinfels-Rotenburg, sister of the Sardinian king's deceased wife Queen Polyxena (1706–1736). They had nine children.

- Princess Carlotta (17 August 1742 – 20 September 1794), who became a nun and died unmarried.
- Victor Amadeus II, Prince of Carignano (31 October 1743 – 10 September 1780), who married Joséphine de Lorraine.
- Princess Leopoldina (21 December 1744 – 17 April 1807), who married Andrea IV Doria-Pamphili-Landi, 8th Prince of Melfi.
- Princess Polyxena (31 October 1746 – 3 December 1762), who died unmarried.
- Princess Gabrielle (27 March 1748 – 10 April 1828), who married Ferdinand Philipp Josef, Prince of Lobkowicz, son of Phillip Hyacinth, Prince of Lobkowicz. Gabrielle and Ferdinand Philipp are the parents of Joseph Franz von Lobkowitz.
- Princess Maria Luisa Teresa (8 September 1749 – 3 September 1792), who married Louis Alexandre de Bourbon, Prince of Lamballe.
- Prince Tommaso (6 December 1751 – 10 September 1753), who died young.
- Prince Eugenio, Count of Villafranca (21 October 1753 – 30 June 1785), who married Élisabeth Anne Magon.
- Princess Caterina (4 April 1762 – 4 September 1823), who married Filippo Giuseppe Francesco Colonna, 9th Prince of Paliano; had issue, from which the current Princes di Paliano descend.

The most renowned of their children, Marie Thérèse, is known to history as the Princesse de Lamballe whose close friendship with Marie Antoinette led to her brutal death during the French Revolution.

Louis Victor lost his wife in September 1778 and died on 16 December at the Palazzo Carignano, the Turin residence of the Carignano family. Since 1835, his wife's grave has been in Turin's Basilica of Superga, as is that of Louis Victor.

=== Descendants ===
His descendants include Vittorio Emanuele, Prince of Naples and Amedeo, 5th Duke of Aosta, rival claimants for the defunct throne of the Kingdom of Italy, as well as Prince Lorenz of Belgium, Archduke of Austria-Este, head of a cadet branch of the former imperial House of Habsburg-Lorraine, and the current head of the House of Lobkowicz.

== Ancestry ==
Ancestors of Louis Victor, Prince of Carignano

8. Thomas Francis, Prince of Carignano
4. Emmanuel Philibert, Prince of Carignano
9. Marie, Countess of Soissons
2. Victor Amadeus I, Prince of Carignano
10. Borso d'Este
5. Maria Caterina d'Este
11. Ippolita d'Este
1. Louis Victor, Prince of Carignano
12. Charles Emmanuel II, Duke of Savoy
6. Victor Amadeus II of Sardinia
13. Marie Jeanne Baptiste of Savoy
3. Maria Vittoria, Marquise of Susa
14. Louis Charles d'Albert, duc de Luynes
7. Jeanne Baptiste d'Albert de Luynes
15. Anne de Rohan
