= Palazzo Caravita di Sirignano =

Coordinates: 40.8338°N 14.2328°E

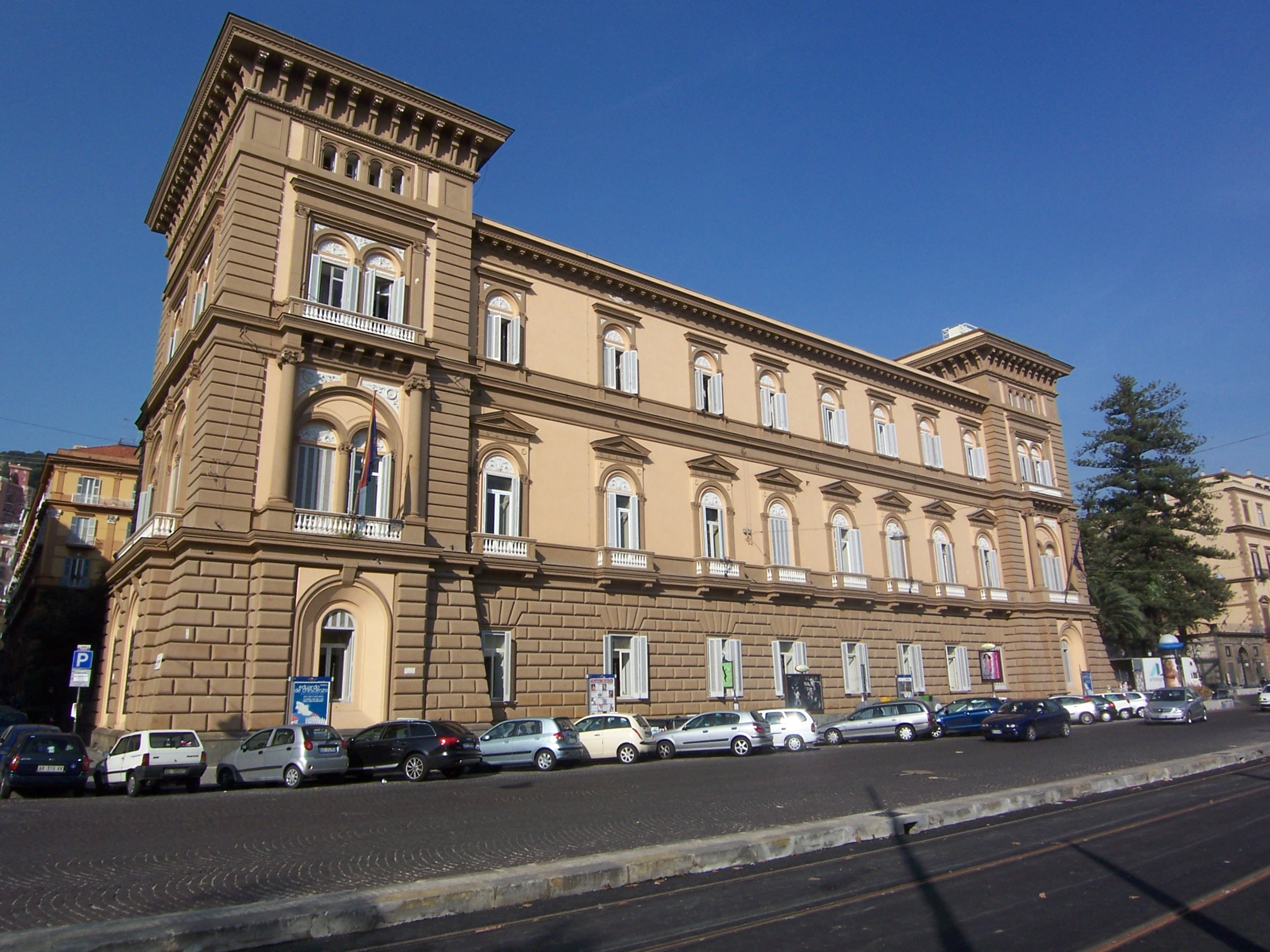
Palazzo Caravita di Sirignano.

The Palazzo Caravita di Sirignano is a monumental palace located at via Rione Sirignano 4, corner with along the strada Riviera di Chiaia in Naples, Italy.

== History ==
The palace was constructed by 1535 by commission of Don Ferdinando Alarcon, Marquis della Valle, Count of Siracusa, a Spanish general known for his affair with Joanna of Aragon, Queen of Naples. The palace had multiple owners in the subsequent centuries: including the viceroy of Naples, the Marquis of Astorga, then the Mendoza family. During the 18th century, the building passed to Caracciolo di Torella and in the second decade of the 19th century was rebuilt by Antonio Annito. In 1838, the Prince Leopold, Count of Syracuse bought the property and commissioned architect Fausto Niccolini with reconstruction. The Grounds included 14 acres of land, and he had a theater built where the art-minded Count had recitals and performances. After 1860, the owner Luigi Compagna converted the palace into multiple residences. His son Francesco Compagna commissioned Ettore Vitale with subdivision of gardens into separate lots. In 1837, the Palazzo Caravita di Sirignano became home of the Tirrenia Navigation company.
