= Victor Amadeus II, Prince of Carignano =

Victor Amadeus
- Prince of Carignano
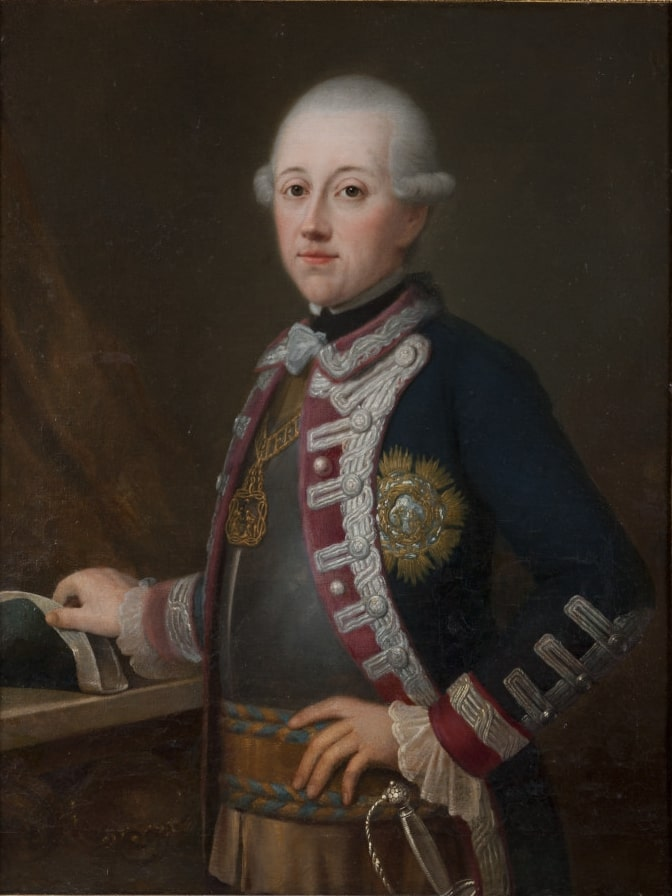

Prince of Carignano
- Reign: 16 December 1778 – 10 September 1780
- Predecessor: Victor Amadeus I
- Successor: Charles Emmanuel
- Born: 31 October 1743; Palazzo Carignano, Turin
- Died: 10 September 1780 (aged 36); Turin, Italy
- Burial: Basilica of Superga
- Spouse: Princess Joséphine of Lorraine (m. 1768)
- Issue Detail: Charles Emmanuel, Prince of Carignano
Names
- Vittorio Amedeo di Savoia
- House: Savoy-Carignano
- Father: Louis Victor, Prince of Carignano
- Mother: Christine of Hesse-Rheinfels-Rotenburg

Victor Amadeus of Savoy, 5th Prince of Carignano (31 October 1743 – 10 September 1780) was a member of the House of Savoy and Prince of Carignano. He was the brother of the murdered princesse de Lamballe and paternal grandfather of King Charles Albert of Sardinia.

== Biography ==
Born in Turin to Louis Victor, Prince of Carignano and his wife Landgravine Christine of Hesse-Rotenburg, he was the couple's second child and eldest son. As a male line descendant of the Duke of Savoy, he was a Prince of Savoy by birth. He was named after his cousin King Victor Amadeus III of Sardinia. At his father's death he succeeded to the style of Prince of Carignano. Expecting to find military glory, his namesake created him Lieutenant General of the Sardinian Army. His career was cut short by his death.

On 18 October 1768 at Oulx Victor Amadeus married Princess Joséphine of Lorraine, daughter of Louis of Lorraine, Prince de Brionne and Princess Louise de Rohan (1734--1815). The couple had one child who succeeded Victor Amadeus as Prince of Carignano in 1780. In 1786 he was moved to the Royal Basilica of Superga outside Turin. The current Prince of Naples is a direct male line descendant.

== Issue ==
- Charles Emmanuel of Savoy (24 October 1770 – 16 August 1800) married Princess Maria Christina of Saxony and had issue.

== Ancestry ==
Ancestors of Victor Amadeus II, Prince of Carignano

16. Thomas Francis, Prince of Carignano
8. Emmanuel Philibert, Prince of Carignano
17. Marie de Bourbon, Countess of Soissons
4. Victor Amadeus I, Prince of Carignano
18. Borso d'Este
9. Maria Angela Caterina d'Este
19. Ippolita d'Este
2. Louis Victor, Prince of Carignano
20. Charles Emmanuel II, Duke of Savoy
10. Victor Amadeus II of Sardinia
21. Princess Marie Jeanne Baptiste of Savoy-Nemours
5. Princess Maria Vittoria of Savoy
22. Louis Charles d'Albert, Duke of Luynes
11. Jeanne Baptiste d'Albert de Luynes
23. Anne de Rohan
1. Victor Amadeus II, Prince of Carignano
24. Ernest, Landgrave of Hesse-Rheinfels
12. William, Landgrave of Hesse-Rotenburg
25. Countess Maria Eleonore of Solms-Lich
6. Ernest Leopold, Landgrave of Hesse-Rotenburg
26. Ferdinand Karl, Count of Löwenstein-Wertheim-Rochefort (= 28)
13. Countess Maria Anna of Löwenstein-Wertheim-Rochefort
27. Countess Anna Maria of Fürstenberg-Heiligenberg (= 29)
3. Landgravine Christine of Hesse-Rotenburg
28. Ferdinand Karl, Count of Löwenstein-Wertheim-Rochefort (= 26)
14. Maximilian Karl Albert, Prince of Löwenstein-Wertheim-Rochefort
29. Countess Anna Maria of Fürstenberg-Heiligenberg (= 27)
7. Countess Eleonore of Löwenstein-Wertheim-Rochefort
30. Mathias Khuen von Belasi, Count of Lichtenberg and Gandegg
15. Countess Maria Polyxena Khuen of Lichtenberg and Belasi
31. Countess Anna Susanna von Meggau zu Kreutzen
