= Princess Christine of Hesse-Rotenburg =

Christine
- Princess of Carignano
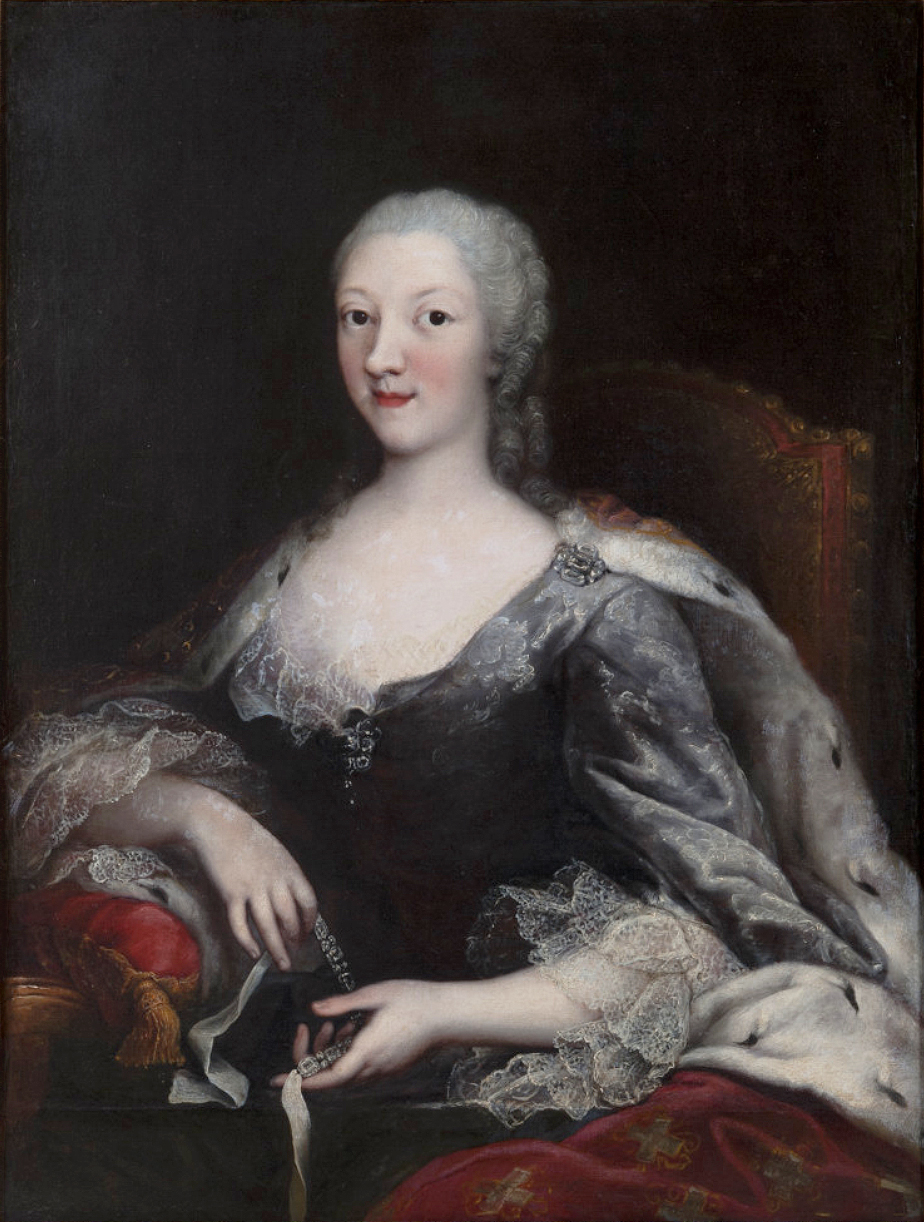
- Portrait by Maria Giovanna Clementi
- Born: 21 November 1717; Schloss Rotenburg, Rotenburg
- Died: 1 September 1778 (aged 60); Palazzo Carignano, Turin, Italy
- Burial: 1786; Basilica of Superga, Turin, Italy
- Spouse: Louis Victor of Savoy, Prince of Carignano (m. 1740)
- Issue Detail: Princess Charlotte; Victor Amadeus II, Prince of Carignano; Leopoldina, Princess of Melfi; Princess Polyxena; Gabriella, Princess of Lobkowicz; Marie Louise, Princess of Lamballe; Prince Tommaso; Eugenio, Count of Villafranca; Caterina, Princess of Paliano
Names
- Italian: Cristina d'Assia-Rotenburg; German: Christine von Hessen-Rheinfels-Rotenburg
- House: Hesse-Rheinfels-Rotenburg
- Father: Ernest Leopold, Landgrave of Hesse-Rotenburg
- Mother: Countess Eleonore of Löwenstein-Rochefort

Princess Christine of Hesse-Rheinfels-Rotenburg (Christine Henriette; 21 November 1717 – 1 September 1778) was a princess of the German dynasty of Hesse-Rheinfels-Rotenburg. She was the Princess of Carignano by marriage and mother of the princesse de Lamballe and of Victor Amadeus II, Prince of Carignan.

== Biography ==
Christine Henriette was born in Rotenburg the youngest of the ten children of the Landgrave Ernst Leopold I of Hesse-Rheinfels-Rotenburg and his wife, Princess Eleonore of Löwenstein-Wertheim-Rochefort. Her older sister Polyxena was married in 1730 to the future Charles Emmanuel III of Sardinia and had issue. Another sister, Caroline was the wife of the French Prime Minister, Louis Henri, Duke of Bourbon until her death in 1741.

After Polyxena's marriage, Christine became engaged to Louis Victor, Prince of Carignan, the eldest surviving child of Victor Amadeus, Prince of Carignan and his wife Maria Vittoria Francesca of Savoy. The Carignans were a cadet branch of the House of Savoy, would inherit from them the kingship of Sardinia, and would be declared kings of Italy from 1861.

Christine married Louis Victor on 4 May 1740 at the age of 22. The next year her husband succeeded to the title Prince de Carignan, the seigneury of Carignan having belonged to the Savoys since 1418. The fact that it was part of Piedmont, only twenty kilometers south of Turin, meant that it could be a "princedom" for the cadet line in name only, being endowed neither with independence nor revenues of substance.

Christine's second child, born at the Palazzo Carignano, was named Victor Amadeus and was the great-grandfather of the future Victor Emmanuel II of Italy. Her fifth daughter was her most famous; Louise, princesse de Lamballe, the tragic best friend of Marie Antoinette.

Christine died at the Palazzo Carignano in Turin on the night of 31 August – 1 September 1778, and was followed less than three months later by her husband. Buried firstly at Turin Cathedral, she was moved in 1835 to Turin's Basilica of Superga. At her death the Gazette de France published a small epitaph for her in honour of her daughter Madame de Lamballe:

Tuesday, the 31st of last month, princesse Christine Henriette de Hesse Rheinfels, wife of Louis Victor Amédée de Savoie, Prince de Carignan, died in this city [Turin], after a lingering and painful illness. She was born the 24th November, 1717.

== Issue ==
1. Princess Charlotte of Savoy (17 August 1742, Turin – 20 February 1794) died unmarried; was a nun;
2. Victor Amadeo, Prince of Carignano (31 October 1743, Turin – September 1780) married Princess Joséphine de Lorraine and had issue;
3. Princess Leopoldina of Savoy (21 December 1744, Turin –17 April 1807, Rome) married Don Andrea IV Doria-Pamphili-Landi, 8th Prince of Melfi, and had issue;
4. Princess Polyxena of Savoy (31 October 1746, Turin – 20 December 1762) died unmarried;
5. Princess Gabrielle of Savoy (17 May 1748, Turin – 10 April 1828, Vienna) married Ferdinand Philipp Josef, Prince of Lobkowicz, and had issue (House of Lobkowicz);
6. Princess Maria Luisa Teresa of Savoy (8 September 1749, Turin – 3 September 1792, Paris) married Louis Alexandre de Bourbon, prince de Lamballe; murdered during the French Revolution;
7. Prince Tommaso of Savoy (6 March 1751, Turin – 23 July 1753)
8. Prince Eugenio of Savoy, Count of Villafranca (21 October 1753, Turin – 30 June 1785) married (without dynastic approval) Élisabeth Anne Magon, and had issue;
9. Princess Caterina of Savoy (4 April 1762, Turin – 4 September 1823) married Don Filippo Colonna, 9th Prince of Paliano, and had issue

== Ancestry ==
Ancestors of Princess Christine of Hesse-Rotenburg

8. Ernest I, Landgrave of Hesse-Rheinfels
4. William I, Landgrave of Hesse-Rotenburg
9. Countess Maria Eleonore of Solms-Hohensolms
2. Ernest II Leopold, Landgrave of Hesse-Rotenburg
10. Ferdinand Karl, Count of Löwenstein-Wertheim-Rochefort
5. Countess Maria Anna of Löwenstein-Wertheim-Rochefort
11. Countess Anna Maria of Fürstenberg
1. Princess Christine of Hesse-Rotenburg
12. Ferdinand Karl, Count of Löwenstein-Wertheim-Rochefort (= 10)
6. Maximilian Karl Albert, Prince of Löwenstein-Wertheim-Rochefort
13. Countess Anna Maria of Fürstenberg (= 11)
3. Countess Eleonore of Löwenstein-Wertheim-Rochefort
14. Count Matthias Khuen von Lichtenberg und Belasi
7. Countess Polyxena Maria Khuen von Lichtenberg und Belasi
15. Countess Anna Susanna von Meggau zu Kreutzen
