= Counts of Villafranca =

Arms of Villafranca-Soissons

The Counts of Savoy-Villafranca, and later the Counts of Villafranca-Soissons, are legitimate male–line descendants of Thomas Francis of Savoy, Prince of Carignano, the founder of the Carignano branch of the House of Savoy.

== History ==
The title was created in 1778 for Prince Eugenio of Savoy (1753–1785). The third count, Prince Eugenio Emanuele, married Felicita Crosio (1844–1911) in 1863 in a morganatic marriage. His wife was created Countess of Villafranca-Soissons in 1888, and the descendants of the marriage bear the title Count or Countess of Villafranca-Soissons. The current head of the Villafranca-Soissons line is Count Edoardo Emanuele Filiberto (born 1945), the grandson of the first count of Villafranca-Soissons through his second son, Count Giuseppe Carlo (1904–1971).

== Counts of Villafranca (1778-1888) ==
- Prince Eugenio, Count of Villafranca (1778–1785)
- Prince Giuseppe Maria, Count of Villafranca (1785–1825)
- Prince Eugenio Emanuele, Count of Villafranca (1816–1888)

== Counts of Villafranca-Soissons (1888-present) ==
- Emanuele Filiberto, Count of Villafranca-Soissons (1888–1933)
- Eugenio Giuseppe, Count of Villafranca-Soissons (1933–1974)
- Edoardo Emanuele Filiberto, Count of Villafranca-Soissons (1974–present)
  - First Heir presumptive: Leonardo Andrea of Villafranca-Soissons
  - Second Heir presumptive: Emanuele Filiberto of Villafranca-Soissons
  - Third Heir presumptive: Gabriele Emilio Filiberto of Villafranca-Soissons
  - Fourth Heir presumptive: Leopoldo Francesco of Villafranca-Soissons
  - Fifth Heir presumptive: Daniel Alexis Eugenio Maria of Villafranca-Soissons
  - Sixth Heir presumptive: Carlo Alberto of Villafranca-Soissons
  - Seventh Heir presumptive: Vittorio Orso of Villafranca-Soissons
