= Paul François de Quélen de Stuer de Caussade, 2nd Duke of La Vauguyon =

French nobleman

Paul François de Quélen de Stuer de Caussade
- 2nd Duke of La Vauguyon
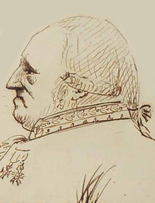
- Full name: Paul François de Quélen de Stuer de Caussade
- Born: 30 July 1746; Paris, France
- Died: 14 March 1828 (aged 81); Paris, France
- Spouse: Marie Antoinette de Pons (April 27, 1766)
- Issue: Paul Antoine, Prince of Carency; Marie Antoinette, Duchess of Bauffremont; Paul Yves, 3rd Duke of La Vauguyon
- Father: Antoine de Quélen de Stuer de Caussade, 1st Duke of La Vauguyon
- Mother: Marie Françoise de Béthune

Paul François de Quélen de Stuer de Caussade, 2nd Duke of La Vauguyon and sometimes mistakenly Paul François de Quélen de Stuer de Caussade de La Vauguyon (30 July 1746 – 14 March 1828) was a French nobleman. He was governor of Cognac, after having been involved in the last campaigns of the Seven Years' War. He wrote a Portrait de feu monseigneur le Dauphin and was menin to the future Louis XVI, one of the Dauphin's sons. A peer of France, brigadier, maréchal de camp, knight of the ordre du Saint-Esprit, he was chosen to be minister plenipotentiary to the Estates General of the Dutch Republic. He later became French ambassador to Spain, knight of the Golden Fleece, temporary minister of foreign affairs in 1789, then minister of the conseil d'État of Louis XVIII in Verona. He was the main intermediary among Louis's agents in France, but became the victim of intrigues. From the Restoration onwards he was lieutenant général and sat in the peerage of France, where he was noted for his moderation. He and his wife (dame d'honneur to the comtesse de Provence) had four children, but the Quelen line ended with his children.

== Parents ==
Vauguyon was descended from an old aristocratic family. His father, Antoine de Quélen de Stuer de Caussade (1706–1772) was the duc de La Vauguyon (1759), prince de Carency, pair de France, Menin to the Dauphin, lieutenant général of the royal armies, governor, first gentleman of the chamber and grand master of the garde-robe to the duke of Burgundy, to the Dauphin and to the counts of Provence and Artois, knight of the ordre du Saint-Esprit and the order of Saint-Louis.

His mother, Marie Françoise de Béthune (1712–1799) was the daughter of the duke of Charost, who was governor to the king's person to Louis XV.

== Life ==
=== Before the Revolution (1758–1789) ===
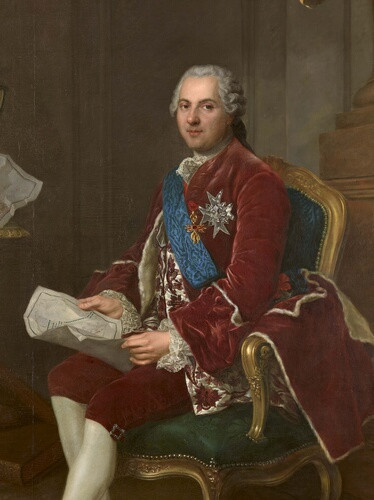
The Dauphin, Louis, father of three kings, subject of La Vauguyon's book "Portrait de feu monseigneur le Dauphin".

Paul François is known by his father's living, under the name of the duke of Saint-Mégrin. He entered the public service aged 12 and fought in the last campaigns of the Seven Years' War. After the war he was made governor of Cognac and took advantage of the post to write and have published an elogy of Louis XVI's father, entitled Portrait de feu monseigneur le Dauphin. His father had been entrusted with the delicate mission of educating the Dauphin's sons on the Dauphin's death, and Paul himself had been menin to the future Louis XVI. He succeeded his father as a peer of France in 1773.

In 1776, on the recommendation of Vergennes, Louis XVI chose La Vauguyon to be France's representative to the Estates General of the Dutch Republic. On his arrival, the Estates were in a sense under the control of the British government - when he left a solemn deputation from the Estates conveyed him their public recognition for his services and gratitude for the :

constant zeal and illumination he had never ceased to show for the common interests of France and the [Dutch] Republic, praying him to be the organ of their recognition before his sovereign and to gain the honour of a defensive alliance

In 1784, La Vauguyon was made French ambassador to Spain. On 1 January 1784 he was simultaneously made maréchal de camp and a knight of the order of the Holy Spirit, and later also became a knight of the Order of the Golden Fleece. However, his post as Spanish ambassador was soon lost with the onset of the French Revolution.

=== During the Revolution ===
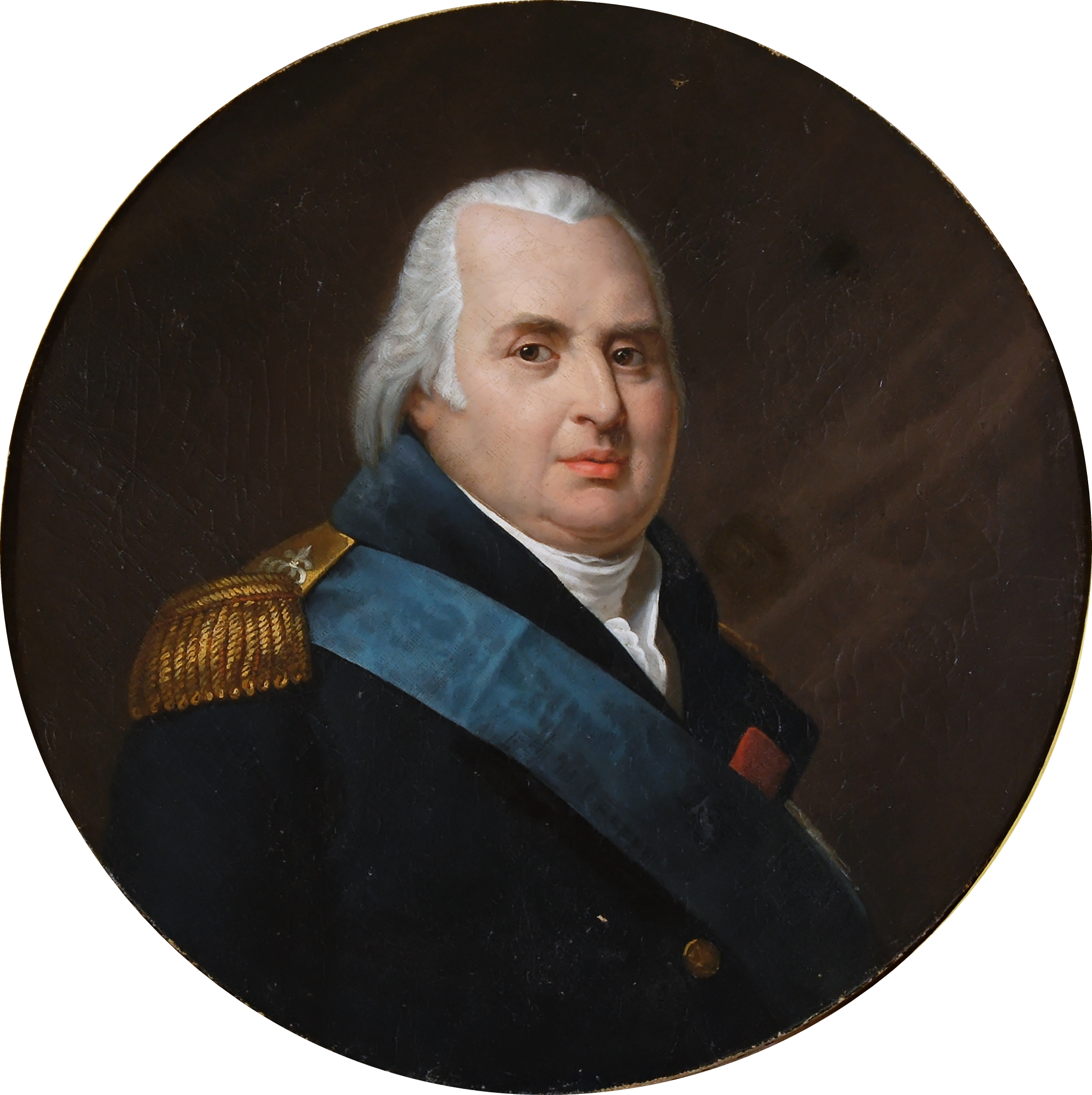
Louis XVIII - La Vauguyon was one of the four ministers who formed his conseil d'État, later becoming a victim of Louis's favourite the count (later duke) of Avaray.

In 1789, La Vauguyon was recalled from Spain by Louis XVI to take possession of the ministry for foreign affairs, as he did on 13 July. He could make the king listen to his advice and found himself under attack from revolutionaries. The Assembly presented new ministers responsible for the events of 14 July and La Vauguyon gave his resignation on 16 July, having been minister for only three days.

Fearing he would pay for "the short and disastrous honour of his ministry" with his head, he disguised himself as a businessman, took a passport under a false name and fled to Le Havre with his son in the hope of crossing to England. They were both arrested in Le Havre and the case was referred to the National Constituent Assembly on 1 August. After a heated discussion Le Havre received orders to set La Vauguyon free.

The king recalled La Vauguyon to Paris and sent him to Madrid again as ambassador. On 16 May 1790, Charles de Lameth complained that his negotiations were as important as those in the hands of La Vauguyon. Differences had arisen between England and Spain, whose cause may be attributed to La Vauguyon's negotiations by the British minister. He was replaced by Bourgoing on 1 June 1790 but continued to stay in Madrid. The Spanish king granted hospitality to La Vauguyon and his family, granting him properties during the Revolutionary storms and giving his son (the future general La Vauguyon, still a child) a post in the Spanish army.

Around the end of 1795, Louis XVIII summoned Paul François de Quelen de La Vauguyon to Verona to be one of the four ministers that made up his conseil d'État. La Vauguyon followed this prince to Blackembourg. The counter-revolutionary plan to use conciliatory plans and in virtue of which royalists would still accept public posts can be attributed to him, but it proved too soft a plan. La Vauguyon rendered major services to the royal cause during his ministry and was Louis XVIII's main intermediary to his agents in France, notably in the La Ville-Heurnois conspiracy. His time in the conseil d'État ended in February 1797 when, due to courtesans' intrigues, he fell into disgrace with the pretender, who his father had nicknamed "the disingenous". The count of Saint-Priest replaced him. He then stayed for a time in Hamburg before returning to Spain, where he stayed until 1805. In that year he returned to France and lived in retirement until the Bourbon Restoration.

=== Under the Bourbon Restoration (1814–1828) ===
Whilst in exile La Vauguyon was promoted to lieutenant général, on 4 June 1814 he was made duke, prince and lieutenant général by a royal decree, with the dukedom made hereditary. He was summoned to sit in the chambre des pairs, where he was of the chief backers for moderation. Lacking ambition, he lived in great simplicity and was received as a member of the société d'instruction élémentaire, several times being elected its president and putting much zeal into spreading mutual education. A doctor's mistake made an intestinal illness fatal, and he died in 1828.

== Wife ==
On 27 April 1766 Paul François de Quelen de La Vauguyon married Marie-Antoinette Rosalie de Pons de Roquefort (1751–1824), maid of the wardrobe to the comtesse de Provence. According to "L'almanach de Versailles" of 1790, she was made dame d'honneur to the comtesse de Provence in 1774.

Marie-Antoinette was the daughter of Charles Armand de Pons (1692–1760) and of Rosalie Le Tonnelier de Breteuil (1725–1792), daughter of minister François Victor Le Tonnelier de Breteuil. Her mother married for the second time in 1771 to Louis Armand Constantin de Rohan-Guemené-Montbazon, known simply as the "Prince de Montbazon" (1731-guillotined 23 July 1794).

In his memoirs baronne d’Oberkirch writes that:

France's envoy to the Hague was the duke of La Vauguyon, later ambassador, whose mother was a Breteuil. Madame the duchess would not appear at the court of Holland to dispute her rank; these were the things on which the king's envoys do not cede abroad, and they are perfectly right. This must be so and has always been so. Madame de La Vauguyon was the daughter of Pons de Rochefort; she was dame d'honneur to My Lady, and had great access to the king's court at Versailles. I do not know more as to what point of étiquette it was that the stadtholder's court did not want to concede; I know for sure that she did not concede it.

She also seems to have been close to Marie Antoinette and sometimes accompanied her on her nights out at Parisian balls:

There were whispers of an adventure at a ball given by the county of Viry, running so - after the banquet, the queen and her suite retired and returned shortly afterwards, masked for the ball. At 3am she was walking with the duchess of La Vauguyon - these two masquers were accosted by a young foreign lord (a stranger to them) who unmasked and spoke for them with a long while, taking them for two ladies of quality of his acquaintance. The misunderstanding gave rise to a singular conversation which was even more fun for her majesty, with suggestions that were light and agreeable without being indiscrete. Two masked men came up to take him back to the party and, after laughing much, they separated from him. The two ladies witnessed to their desire to retire; the German baron led them; he presented a simple carriage to them; when he question them as they got in, madame de La Vauguyon unmasked. You may judge the foreigner's surprise, and how it grew when - returning - he also recognised the person who was about to unmask: respect and a sort of confusion followed recognition.

Du Barri wrote : The duchess of La Vauguyon was a lady of the wardrobe. Very serious and grave, she had an imposing and severe air, such was the basis of her character. She had much spirit but hid it for fear of exposing her dignity by showing it and of also compromising the superiority of Madame la comtesse de Provence.

== Children ==
He and his wife had two sons and two daughters :

- Paul-Antoine (1768–1824), prince de Carency, on 14 September 1789 married Florence Constance de Rochechouart-Faudoas, daughter of Aimeric count of Faudoas.
- Marie-Antoinette de Quelen de La Vauguyon (1771–1847), on 13 May 1787 married Alexandre de Bauffremont, prince-duc de Bauffremont.
- Paul-Yvon (1777–1837) was duke of La Vauguyon, prince de Carency, and marquis of Saint-Megrin, peer of France, maréchal de camp, and lieutenant général (firstly in the kingdom of Naples, then the French Army). He fought in Napoleon's armies and was aide de camp to grand-duke de Berg. He followed Joachim Murat to Naples and became general and colonel general of infantry in his guard. Unmarried and without children, the Quelen family died out with him.
- Pauline-Antoinette de La Vauguyon (1783–1829), married Prince Joseph of Savoy-Villafranca.

== Works ==
- "Portrait de feu monseigneur le Dauphin", par M. L. O. D. (with Cerutti); Paris, 1765, 1816, in-8°;
- "Les Doutes éclaircis, ou réponses aux objections de l'abbé de Mably sur l'ordre naturel des sociétés politiques"; Paris, 1768, in-12. "Cet ouvrage, en forme de lettre, qui parut d'abord dans les Éphémérides du Citoyen pour 1768, est très rare, dit Barbier, l'édition ayant été imprimée à un petit nombre d'exemplaires ";
- "Tableau de la Constitution française", Paris, 1816, in-8;
- "De la simplification des principes constitutifs et administratifs, ou commentaire nouveau sur la Charte constitutionnelle", Paris, lviO, in-60;
- "Du Système général des Finances", Paris, in-8° : les trois derniers ouvrages ont paru sons les initiales de M. L. D. D. L. V. L. L

And on his own :

- "Duc de Choiseul, Eloge de M. le duc de La Vauguyon, prononcé è la chambre des pairs le 10 avril 1828. "
- Lardier, "Histoire biographique de la Chambre des Paires". Barbier, Dict. des Anonymes
- Quérard, "La France Littéraire".
