= Marie Thérèse Louise of Savoy, Princesse de Lamballe =

Marie-Thérèse Louise of Savoy
- Princesse de Lamballe
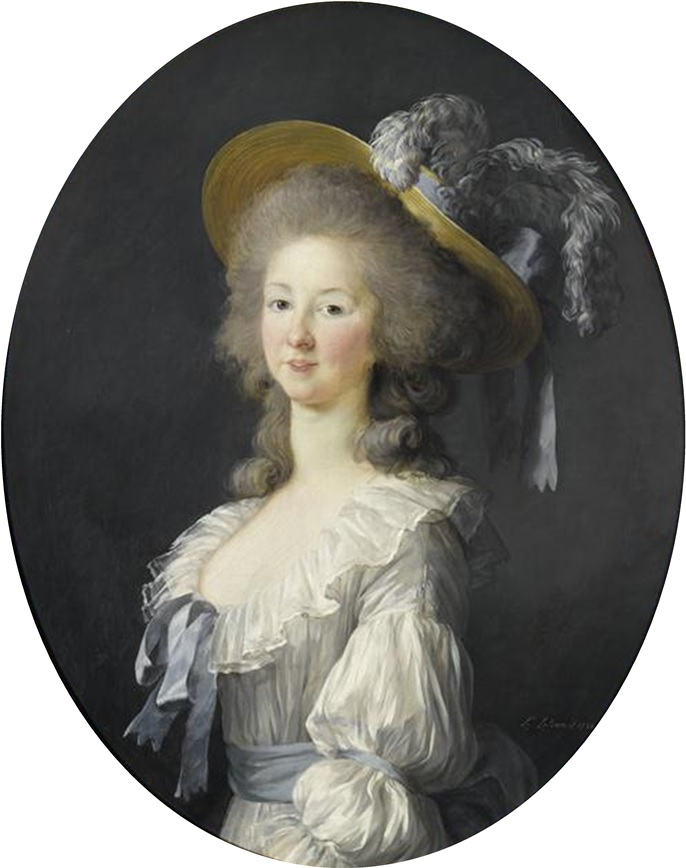
- Portrait by Élisabeth Vigée-Lebrun
- Born: 8 September 1749; Palazzo Carignano, Turin, Kingdom of Sardinia
- Died: 3 September 1792 (aged 42); Paris, France
- Spouse: Louis Alexandre de Bourbon, Prince de Lamballe (m. 1767; died 1768)
Names
- Italian: Maria Teresa Luisa di Savoia-Carignano; French: Marie Thérèse Louise de Savoie-Carignan
- House: Savoy-Carignano
- Father: Louis Victor of Savoy, Prince of Carignano
- Mother: Princess Christine of Hesse-Rotenburg

Marie-Thérèse Louise of Savoy, Princesse de Lamballe (Italian: Maria Teresa Luisa; 8 September 1749 – 3 September 1792) was an Italian noblewoman and member of the Savoy-Carignano cadet branch of the House of Savoy. She was married at the age of 17 to Louis Alexandre de Bourbon-Penthièvre, Prince de Lamballe, the heir to the greatest fortune in France. After her marriage, which lasted a year, she went to the French royal court and became the confidante of Queen Marie Antoinette. She was killed in the massacres of September 1792 during the French Revolution.

== Youth ==
Maria Teresa Luisa was born on 8 September 1749 at the Palazzo Carignano in Turin. She was the sixth child and fifth daughter of Louis Victor of Savoy, Prince of Carignano, a maternal grandson of King Victor Amadeus II of Sardinia and his mistress Jeanne d'Albert de Luynes. Her mother was Landgravine Christine Henriette of Hesse-Rheinfels-Rotenburg. At her birth, it is said that many civilians lined the streets, cheering and singing over the birth of Maria Teresa. Little is known about her childhood.

== Marriage ==
On 31 January 1767, Maria Teresa was married by proxy marriage to Louis Alexandre de Bourbon-Penthièvre. He was a son of Louis de Bourbon-Toulouse, Duke of Penthièvre and Princess Maria Teresa d'Este, thus making him a grandson of Louis XIV's legitimised son Louis Alexandre de Bourbon.

The marriage was arranged after it had been suggested by Louis XV as a suitable match as both the bride and the groom were members of the collateral branch of both ruling families, and it was accepted by her family because the King of Sardinia had long wished for an alliance between the House of Savoy and the House of Bourbon.

The wedding by proxy, followed by a bedding ceremony and a banquet, was held at the Savoyard royal court in Turin and attended by the King of Sardinia and his court. On 24 January, the bride crossed the bridge of Beauvoisin between Savoy and France, where she left her Italian entourage and was welcomed by her new French retinue, who escorted her to her groom and father-in-law at the Chateau de Nangis. She was introduced to the French royal court at the Palace of Versailles by Maria Fortunata, Countess de La Marche in February, where she made a favourable impression. In France, she adopted the French version of her name, Marie Thérèse Louise.

The marriage was initially described as very happy, as both parties were attracted to each other's beauty; after only a few months, though, Louis Alexandre was unfaithful with two actresses, which reportedly devastated Marie Thérèse. She was comforted by her father-in-law, to whom she became close.

In 1768, at the age of 19, having been married for just a year, Marie Thérèse became a widow when her husband died of a venereal disease at the Château de Louveciennes, nursed by his spouse and sister. Marie Thérèse inherited her husband's considerable fortune, making her wealthy in her own right. Her father-in-law successfully persuaded her to abandon her wish to become a nun and instead stay with him as his daughter. She comforted him in his grief, and joined him in his extensive charitable projects at Rambouillet, an activity which earned him the name "King of the Poor" and her the nickname "The Angel of Penthièvre".

In 1768, after the death of Marie Leszczyńska, the Queen of France who was immediately fond of Marie Therese Louise, Madame Marie Adélaïde supported a match between her father, Louis XV and the dowager Princesse de Lamballe, Marie Thérèse. Madame Adélaïde, reportedly, preferred a queen who was young and beautiful but lacked ambition; who could attract and distract her father from state affairs, leaving them to Madame Adélaïde herself. The match was supported by the Noailles family. However, Marie Thérèse was not willing to encourage the match herself, and her former father-in-law, the Duke of Penthièvre, was not willing to consent. The marriage plan never materialised.

Marie Thérèse lived at the Hôtel de Toulouse in Paris and the Château de Rambouillet. On 4 January 1769, there was an announcement of the marriage of Marie Thérèse's sister-in-law Mademoiselle de Penthièvre to the young Philippe d'Orléans.

== Lady-in-waiting ==
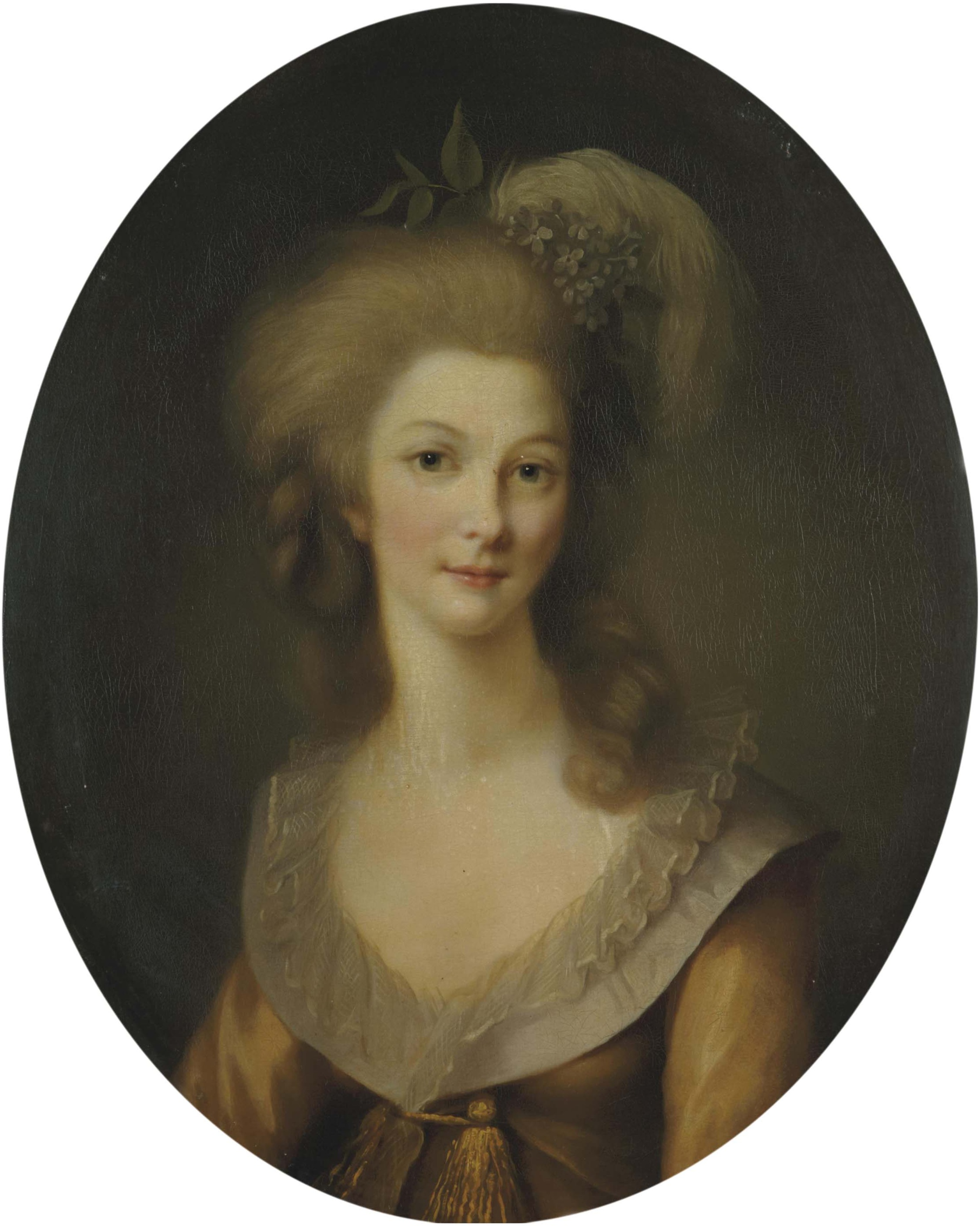
Portrait of Marie Thérèse in 1779, by Marie-Victoire Lemoine

Marie Thérèse had a role to play in royal ceremonies, and when the new dauphine, Marie Antoinette, arrived in France in 1770, she was presented to her along with the Dukes and Duchesses of Orléans, Chartres, Bourbon, and the other "Princes of the Blood" with her father-in-law in Compiégne. During 1771, the Duke de Penthiévre started to entertain more, among others the Crown Prince of Sweden and the King of Denmark; Marie Thérèse acted as his hostess and started to attend court more often, participating in the balls held by Madame de Noailles in the name of Marie Antoinette, who was reportedly charmed by Marie Thérèse and overwhelmed her with attention and affection that spectators did not fail to notice. In March 1771 the Austrian ambassador reported:

For some time past the Dauphine has shown a great affection for the Princesse de Lamballe. ... This young princess is sweet and amiable, and enjoying the privileges of a Princess of the Blood Royal, is in a position to avail herself of her Royal Highness's favour.

The Gazette de France mentions Marie Thérèse's presence in the chapel at high mass on Holy Thursday, at which the king was present, accompanied by the royal family, including the Duke de Bourbon and the Duke de Penthièvre. In May 1771, Marie Thérèse went to Fontainebleau, and was there presented by the king to her cousin, the future Comtesse de Provence, attending the supper after. In November 1773, another one of her cousins married the third prince, the Count of Artois, and she was present at the birth of Louis-Philippe in Paris in October 1773. After her cousins had married Marie Antoinette's brothers-in-law, Marie Thérèse came to be treated by Marie Antoinette as a relation, and during these first years, the Counts and Countesses of Provence and Artois formed a circle of friends with Marie Antoinette and Marie Thérèse, and were known to have spent a lot of their time together, Marie Thérèse being described as almost constantly by Marie Antoinette's side. Marie Antoinette's mother, Maria Theresa, somewhat disliked the attachment, because she disliked favourites and intimate friends of royalty in general, though Marie Thérèse was, because of her rank, regarded as an acceptable choice, if such an intimate friend was needed.

On 18 September 1775, following the ascension of Marie Antoinette's husband to the throne in May 1774, Marie Antoinette appointed Marie Thérèse "Superintendent of the Queen's Household", the highest rank possible for a lady-in-waiting at Versailles. This appointment was controversial: the office had been vacant for over thirty years because the position was expensive, superfluous, and gave far too much power and influence to the bearer, giving her rank and power over all other ladies-in-waiting and requiring all orders given by any other female office holder to be confirmed by her before it could be carried out, and Marie Thérèse, though of sufficient rank to be appointed, was regarded as too young, which would offend those placed under her, but the queen regarded it as just a reward for her friend.

After Marie Antoinette became queen, her intimate friendship with Marie Thérèse was given greater attention, and Ambassador Mercy reported:

Her Majesty continually sees the Princesse de Lamballe in her rooms [...] This lady joins to much sweetness a very sincere character, far from intrigue and all such worries. The Queen has conceived for some time a real friendship for this young Princess, and the choice is excellent, for although a Piedmontese, Madame de Lamballe is not at all identified with the interests of Mesdames de Provence and d'Artois. All the same, I have taken the precaution to point out to the Queen that her favour and goodness to the Princesse de Lamballe are somewhat excessive, in order to prevent abuse of them from that quarter.

Empress Maria Theresa tried to discourage the friendship out of fear that Maria Thérèse, as a former Princess of Savoy, would try to benefit Savoyard interest through the queen. During her first year as queen, Marie Antoinette reportedly said to her husband, who was very approving of her friendship with Marie Thérèse: "Ah, sire, the Princesse de Lamballe's friendship is the charm of my life." Marie Thérèse welcomed her brothers at court, and upon the queen's wish, Marie Thérèse's favourite brother Eugène was granted a lucrative post with his own regiment in the French Royal Army. Later, Marie Thérèse was also granted the governorship of Poitiou for her brother-in-law by the queen.

Marie Thérèse was described as proud, sensitive, and with a delicate though irregular beauty. Not a wit and not one to participate in plots, she was able to amuse Marie Antoinette, but she was of a reclusive nature and preferred to spend time with the queen alone rather than to participate in high society: she suffered from what was described as "nerves, convulsions, fainting-fits", and reportedly could faint and remain unconscious for hours. The office of Superintendent required that she confirmed all orders regarding the queen before they could be performed, that all letters, petitions, or memoranda to the queen were to be channelled through her, and that she entertain in the name of the queen. The office aroused great envy and insulted a great number of people at court because of the precedence in rank it gave. It also gave an enormous salary of 50,000 crowns a year, and because of the condition of the state's economy and the great wealth of the princess, she was asked to renounce the salary. When she refused for the sake of rank and stated that she would either have all the privileges of the office or retire, she was granted the salary by the queen herself. This incident aroused much bad publicity, thus painting Marie Thérèse as a greedy royal favourite, and her famous fainting spells were widely mocked as manipulative simulations. She was openly talked about as the favourite of the queen and was greeted almost as visiting royalty when she travelled around the country during her free time, and had many poems dedicated to her.

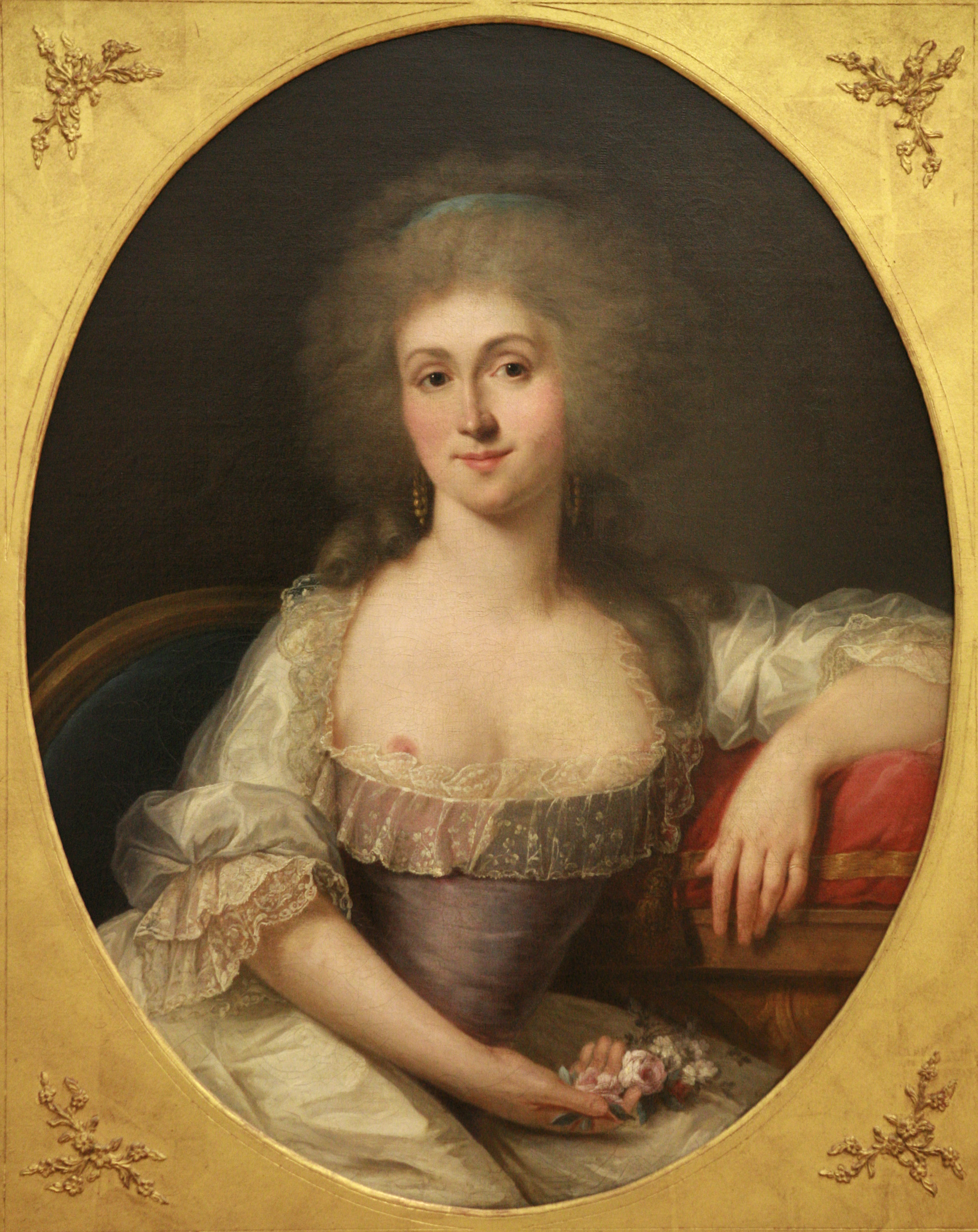
Portrait of Marie Thérèse, by Joseph Duplessis (c. 1775)

In 1775, however, Marie Thérèse was gradually replaced in her position as favourite by Yolande de Polastron, the Duchesse de Polignac. The outgoing and social Yolande referred to the reserved Marie Thérèse as a boor, while Marie Thérèse herself disliked the bad influence she regarded Yolande to have over the queen. Marie Antoinette, who was unable to make them get along, started to prefer the company of Yolande, who could better satisfy her need for amusement and pleasure. In April 1776, Ambassador Mercy reported: "The Princesse de Lamballe loses much in favour. I believe she will always be well treated by the Queen, but she no longer possesses her entire confidence", and continued in May by reporting of "constant quarrels, in which the Princesse seemed always to be in the wrong". When Marie Antoinette started to participate in amateur theater at the Petit Trianon, Yolande convinced her to refuse Marie Thérèse'a admission to them, and in 1780, Ambassador Mercy reported: "the Princesse is very little seen at court. The Queen, it is true, visited her on her father's death, but it is the first mark of kindness she has received for long." Though Marie Thérèse was replaced by Yolande as favourite, the friendship with the queen nevertheless continued on an on-and-off-basis: Marie Antoinette occasionally visited her in her rooms, and reportedly appreciated her serenity and loyalty in between the entertainments offered to her by Yolande, once commenting, "She is the only woman I know who never bears a grudge; neither hatred nor jealousy is to be found in her." After the death of Marie Antoinette's mother, Marie Antoinette isolated herself with Marie Thérèse and Yolande during the winter to mourn. Marie Thérèse kept her office of Superintendent at the French royal court after she lost her position as favourite, and continued to perform her duties—she hosted balls in the name of the queen, introduced debutantes to her, assisted her in receiving foreign royal guests, and participated in the ceremonies around the birth of the queen's children and the queen's annual Easter Communion. Outside of her formal duties, however, she was often absent from court, attending to the bad health of both herself and her father-in-law. She engaged in her close friendship with her own favourite lady-in-waiting, Countess Étiennette d'Amblimont de Lâge de Volude, as well as her charity and her interest in the Freemasons. Marie Thérèse, as well as that of her sister-in-law, became inducted into the Freemasonic women's Adoption Lodge of St. Jean de la Candeur in 1777, and was made Grand Mistress of the Scottish Lodge in January 1781. Though Marie Antoinette did not become an official member, she was interested in Freemasonry and often asked Marie Thérèse of the Adoption Lodge. During the famous Affair of the Diamond Necklace, Marie Thérèse was seen in an unsuccessful attempt to visit the imprisoned Jeanne de la Motte at La Salpetriere; the purpose of this visit is unknown, but it created widespread rumours at the time.

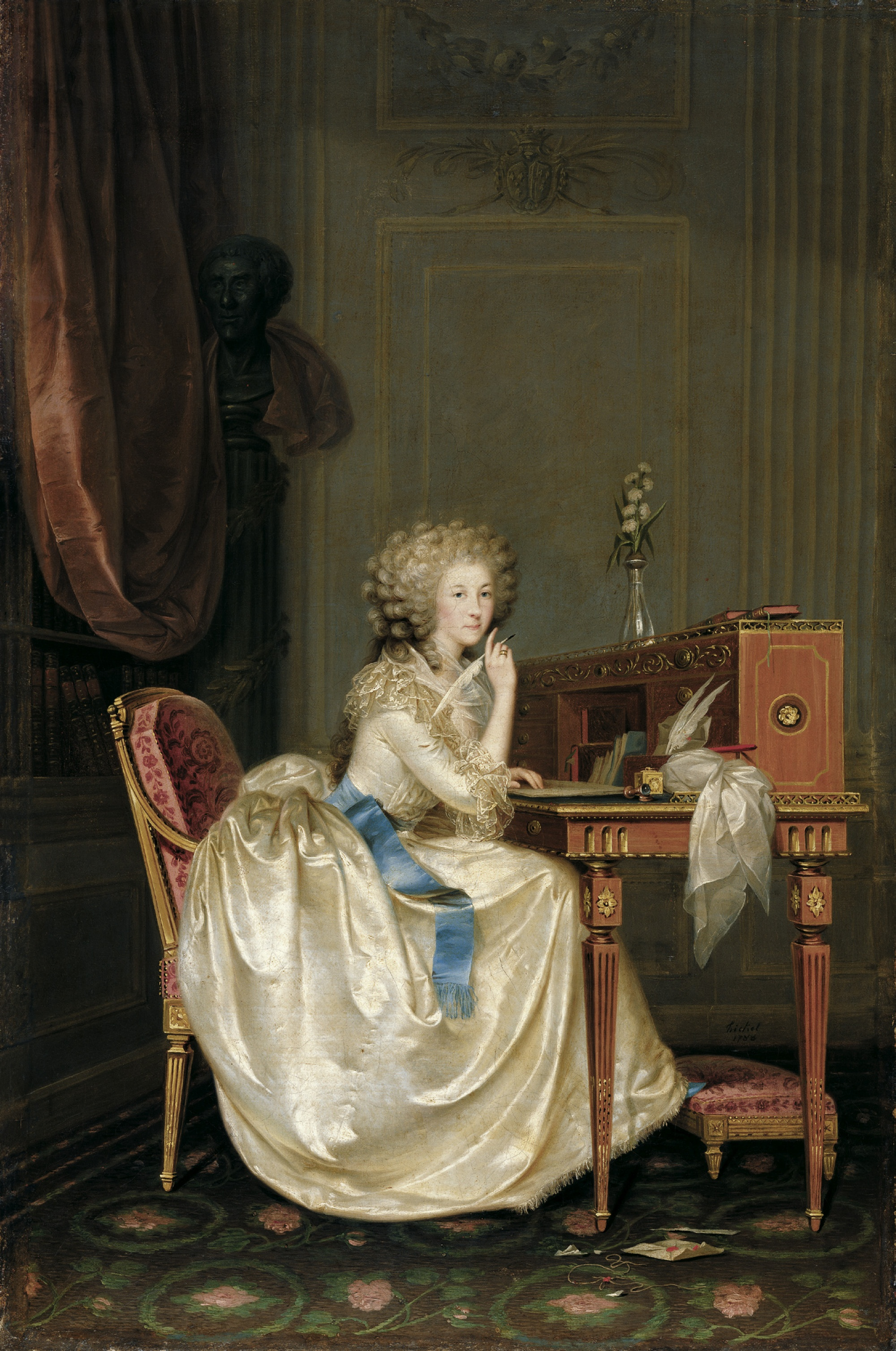
Portrait of Marie Thérèse in 1788, by Anton Hickel at the Liechtenstein Museum in Vienna

Marie Thérèse had suffered from weak health, which deteriorated so much during the mid-1780s that she was often unable to perform the duties of her office. At one occasion, she even engaged Deslon, a pupil of Franz Mesmer, to mesmerize her. She spent the summer of 1787 in England, advised by doctors to take the English waters in Bath to cure her health. This trip was much publicised as a secret diplomatic mission on behalf of the queen, with speculations that she was to ask the exiled minister Calonne to omit certain incidents from the memoirs he was about to publish, but Calonne was in fact not in England at that time. After the visit to England, Marie Thérèse's health improved considerably, and she was able to participate more at court, where the queen now gave her more affection again, appreciating Marie Thérèse's loyalty after the friendship between Marie Antoinette and Yolande had started to deteriorate. At this point, Marie Thérèse and her sister-in-law joined in with the Parliament to petition on behalf of the Duke of Orléans, who was exiled. In the spring of 1789, Marie Thérèse was present in Versailles to participate in the ceremonies around the opening of the Estates General in France.

Marie Thérèse was by nature reserved and, at court, she had the reputation of being a prude. However, in popular anti-monarchist propaganda of the time, she was regularly portrayed in pornographic pamphlets, showing her as the queen's lesbian lover to undermine the public image of the monarchy.

=== French Revolution ===
During the Storming of the Bastille in July 1789 and the outbreak of the French Revolution, Marie Thérèse was on a leisurely visit to Switzerland with her favourite lady-in-waiting, the Countess de Lâge, and when she returned to France in September, she stayed with her father-in-law in the countryside to nurse him while he was ill, and thus was not present at court during the Women's March on Versailles, which took place on 5 October 1789, when she was with her father-in-law in Aumale.

On 7 October 1789, she was informed of the events of the Revolution and immediately joined the royal family in the Tuileries Palace in Paris, where she reassumed the duties of her office. She and Madame Élisabeth shared the apartments of the Pavillon de Flore in the Tuileries Palace, in level with the queen's, and except for brief visits to her father-in-law or her villa in Passy, she settled there permanently.

In the Tuileries Palace, the ritual court entertainments and representational life was to some level reinstated. As the king held his levées and couchers, the queen held a card party every Sunday and Tuesday, and held a court reception on Sundays and Thursdays before attending mass and dining in public with the king, as well as giving audience to the foreign envoys and the official deputations each week; all events in which Marie Thérèse, in her office of Superintendent, participated, being always seen at the queen's side both in public as well as in private. She accompanied the royal family to St. Cloud in the summer of 1790, and also attended the Fête de la Fédération at the Champ de Mars in Paris in July.

Previously unwilling to entertain in the queen's name as her office required, during these years she entertained lavishly and widely in her office at the Tuileries Palace, where she hoped to gather loyal nobles to help the queen's cause, and her salon came to serve as a meeting place for the queen and the members of the National Constituent Assembly, many of whom the queen wished to win over to the cause of the Bourbon monarchy. It was reportedly in the apartment of Marie Thérèse that the queen had her political meetings with Mirabeau.

In parallel, she also investigated the loyalty of the court staff through a network of informers. Madame Campan described how she was once interviewed by Marie Thérèse, who explained that she had been informed that Madame Campan had been receiving deputies in her room and that her loyalty toward the monarchy had been questioned, but that Marie Thérèse had investigated the accusations by use of spies, which had cleared Madame Campan from the charges. Madame Campan writes, "The Princesse then showed me a list of the names of all those employed about the Queen's chamber, and asked me for information concerning them. Fortunately, I had only favorable information to give, and she wrote down everything I told her."

After the Duchesse de Polignac's departure from France and most others from the queen's intimate circle of friends, Marie Antoinette warned Marie Thérèse that she would, now in her visible role, attract much of the anger among the public toward the favourites of the queen, and that libels circulating openly in Paris would expose her to slander. Marie Thérèse reportedly read one of these volumes and was informed of the hostility voiced toward her in them.

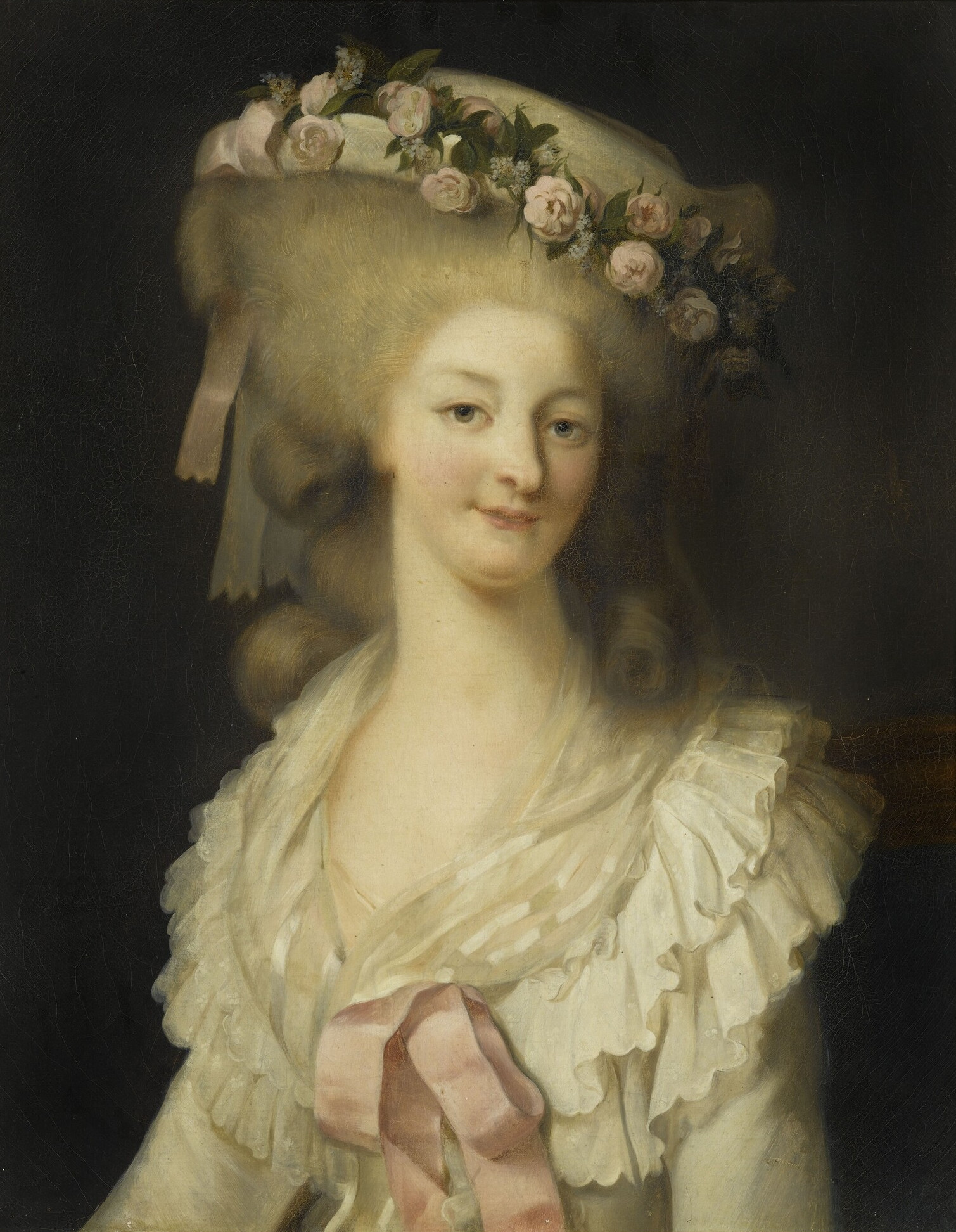
Portrait of Madame de Lamballe, by Louis-Édouard Rioult (c. 1790–1855)

Marie Thérèse supported her sister-in-law, the Duchess of Orléans, when she filed for divorce from the Duke of Orléans, which has been viewed as a reason of discord between Marie Thérèse and the House of Orléans; though the duke had often used Marie as an intermediary to the queen, he reportedly never quite trusted her, since he expected Marie Thérèse to blame him for encouraging the behaviour which caused the death of Marie Thérèse's late spouse, and when he was informed that she had ill will toward him during this affair, he reportedly broke with her.

==== Flight to Varennes ====
Marie Thérèse was not informed beforehand of the Flight to Varennes. The night of the escape in June 1791, the queen said goodnight to her and advised her to spend some days in the country for the sake of her health before she retired. Marie Thérèse found her behaviour odd enough to remark about it to M. de Clermot, before leaving the Tuileries Palace to retire to her villa in Passy. The day after, when the royal family had already departed during the night, she received a note from Marie Antoinette who told her about the flight and told her to meet her in Brussels. In the company of her ladies-in-waiting, Countess de Lâge, Countess de Ginestous, and two male courtiers, she immediately visited her father-in-law in Aumale, informed him of her flight and asked him for letters of introduction.

She departed France from Boulogne to Dover in England, where she stayed for one night before continuing to Ostend in the Austrian Netherlands, where she arrived on 26 June. She continued to Brussels, where she met Axel von Fersen and the Count and Countess de Provence, and then to Aix-la-Chapelle. She visited King Gustav III of Sweden in Spa for a few days in September, and received him in Aix in October. In Paris, the Chronique de Paris reported her departure and it was widely believed that she had gone to England for a diplomatic mission on behalf of the queen.

She was long in doubt as to whether she would be in most use for the queen in or outside of France, and received conflicting advice: her friends M. de Clermont and M. de la Vaupalière encouraged her to return to the service of the queen, while her relatives asked her to return to Turin in Savoy. During her stay abroad, she was in correspondence with Marie Antoinette, who repeatedly asked her not to return to France. However, in October 1791, the new provisions of the Constitution came into operation, and the queen was requested to set her household in order and dismissed all office holders not in service. She accordingly wrote officially to Marie Thérèse and formally asked her to return to service or resign. This formal letter, though it was contradicted by the private letters Marie Antoinette had written her, reportedly convinced her that it was her duty to return, and she announced that the queen wished her to return and that "I must live and die with her."

During her stay at a house that she had rented in the Royal Crescent in Bath, Great Britain, the princess wrote her will, because she was convinced that she risked mortal danger should she return to Paris. Other information, however, states that the will was made in the Austrian Netherlands, being dated "Aix la Chapelle, to-day the 15th October 1791. Marie Thérèse Louise de Savoie". She left Aix la Chapelle on 20 October and her arrival in Paris was announced in the Paris newspapers of 4 November.

Back in the Tuileries Palace, Marie Thérèse resumed her office and her work rallying supporters for the queen, investigating the loyalty of the household and writing to the noble émigrées, asking them to return to France in the name of the queen. In February 1792, for example, Louis Marie de Lescure was convinced to remain in France rather than emigrating after having met the queen in the apartment of Marie Thérèse, who then informed him and his spouse Victoire de Donnissan de La Rochejaquelein of the queen's wishes that they should remain in France out of loyalty. Marie Thérèse aroused the dislike of Mayor Pétion, who objected to the queen attending supper in Marie Thérèse's apartment, and widespread rumours claimed that the rooms of Marie Thérèse at the Tuileries Palace were the meeting place of an 'Austrian Committee' plotting to encourage the invasion of France, a second St. Bartholomew's Day massacre and the destruction of the Revolution.

During the demonstration of 20 June 1792, she was present in the company of the queen when a mob broke into the palace. Marie Antoinette immediately cried that her place was by the king's side, but Marie Thérèse then cried: "No, no, Madame, your place is with your children!", after which a table was pulled before her to protect her from the mob. Marie Thérèse, alongside Princess de Tarente, Madame de Tourzel, the Duchess de Maillé, Madame de Laroche-Aymon, Marie Angélique de Mackau, Renée Suzanne de Soucy, Madame de Ginestous, and a few noblemen, belonged to the courtiers surrounding the queen and her children for several hours when the mob passed by the room shouting insults to Marie Antoinette. According to a witness, Marie Thérèse stood leaning by the queen's armchair to support her through the entire scene: "Madame de Lamballe displayed even greater courage. Standing during the whole of that long scene, leaning upon the Queen's chair, she seemed only occupied with the dangers of that unhappy princess without regarding her own."

Marie Thérèse continued her services to the queen until the attack on the palace on 10 August 1792, when she and Louise-Élisabeth de Croÿ de Tourzel, governess to the royal children, accompanied the royal family when they took refuge in the Legislative Assembly. M. de la Rochefoucauld was present during this occasion and recollected:

I was in the garden, near enough to offer my arm to Madame la Princesse de Lamballe, who was the most dejected and frightened of the party; she took it. [...] Madame la Princesse de Lamballe said to me: "We shall never return to the Château."

During their stay in the clerk's box at the Legislative Assembly, Marie Thérèse became ill and had to be taken to the Couvent des Feuillants; Marie Antoinette asked her not to return, but she nevertheless chose to return to the family as soon as she felt better. She also accompanied them from the Legislative Assembly to the Feuillant convent, and from there to the Temple.

== Imprisonment ==
On 19 August 1792, Marie Thérèse, Louise-Élisabeth de Croÿ de Tourzel and Pauline de Tourzel were separated from the royal family and transferred to the La Force prison, where they were allowed to share a cell. They were removed from the Temple at the same time as two valets and three female servants, as it was decided that the royal family should not be allowed to keep their retainers.

During the September Massacres, the prisons were seized by mobs, and the prisoners were placed before hastily assembled people's tribunals, which judged and executed them summarily. Each prisoner was asked a handful of questions, after which the prisoner was either freed with the words "Vive la nation", and permitted to leave, or sentenced to death with the words "Conduct him to the Abbaye" or "Let him go", after which the condemned was taken to a yard where they were immediately killed by a mob of men, women and children. The massacres were opposed by prison staff, who allowed many prisoners to escape, particularly women. Of about two hundred women, only two were ultimately killed.

Pauline de Tourzel was smuggled out of the prison, but her mother and the Princesse de Lamballe were too well known to be able to escape in this way. Their escape would have risked attracting too much notice. Almost all women prisoners tried before the tribunals in the La Force prison were freed of charges. Among them were almost all the former members of the royal household who were kept in La Force at the time. The former royal governesses Madame de Tourzel and Marie Angélique de Mackau, as well as the lady-in-waiting the Princesse de Tarente, the queen's lady's maid Marie-Élisabeth Thibault, Madame Royale's lady's maid Madame Bazile, the dauphin's nurse Madame Marie Jorel de Saint-Brice, and Madame Elsabeth's lady's-maid Madame Marie-Thérèse de Navarre, as well as the wife of the king's valet Madame de Septeuil, were all allowed to depart - as were even two male members of the royal household; the king's valet Claude Lorimier de Chamilly and the dauphin's valet François Hue. The Princesse de Lamballe was therefore to be an exception.

== Death ==
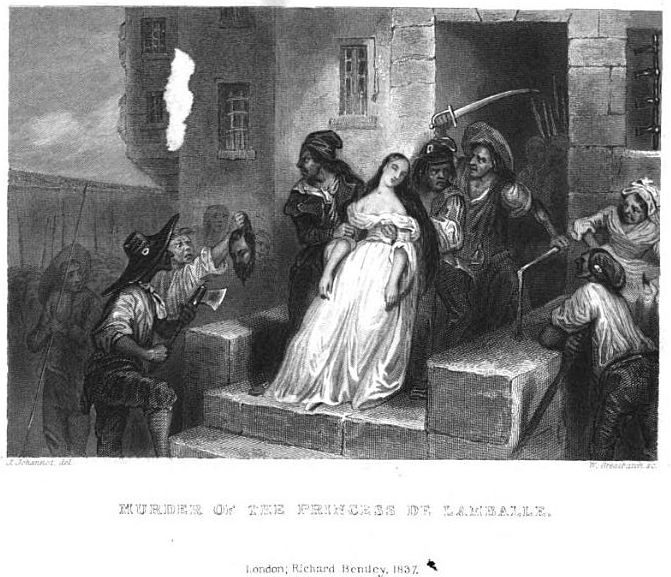
The murder of Princesse de Lamballe, from an etching by Richard Bentley in 1837

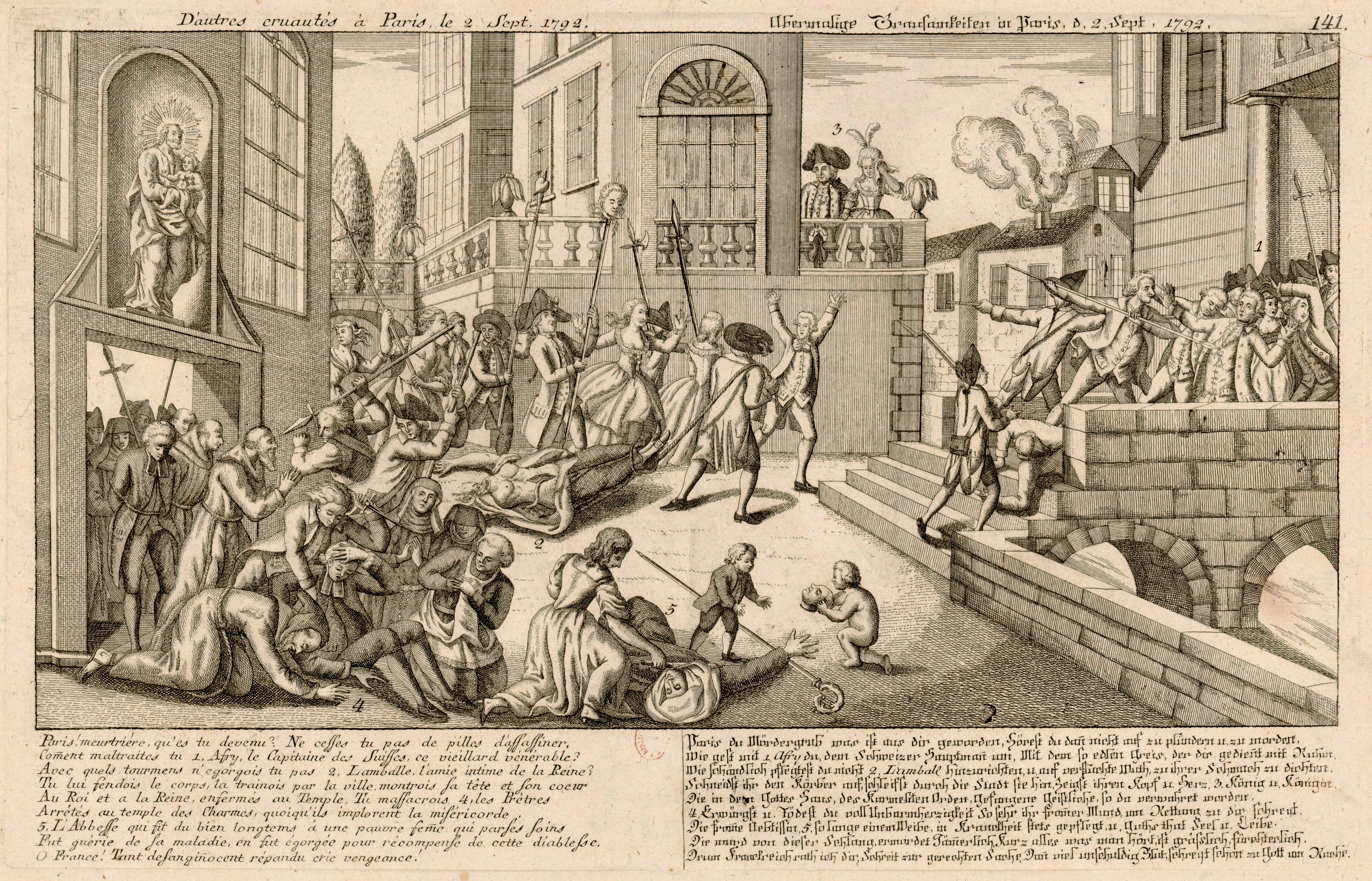
A propaganda engraving of the death of Princesse de Lamballe, 1792

On 3 September 1792, Marie Thérèse and Madame de Tourzel were taken out to a courtyard with other prisoners, waiting to be taken to the tribunal. She was brought before a hastily assembled tribunal which demanded she "take an oath to love liberty and equality and to swear hatred to the King and the Queen and to the monarchy". She agreed to take the oath to liberty but refused to denounce the king, queen, and monarchy. Her trial was summarily ended with the words "emmenez madame" ("take madame away"). She was in the company of Madame de Tourzel until she was called into the tribunal, and the exact wording of the summary trial is stated to have consisted of the following swift interrogation:

"Who are you?"
"Marie Thérèse Louise, Princess of Savoy."
"Your employment?"
"Superintendent of the Household to the Queen."
"Had you any knowledge of the plots of the court on the 10th August?"
"I know not whether there were any plots on the 10th August; but I know that I had no knowledge of them."
"Swear to Liberty and Equality, and hatred of the King and Queen."
"Readily to the former; but I cannot to the latter: it is not in my heart."
[Reportedly, agents of her father-in-law whispered to her to swear the oath to save her life, upon which she added:]
"I have nothing more to say; it is indifferent to me if I die a little earlier or later; I have made the sacrifice of my life."
"Let Madame be set at liberty."

She was then quickly escorted by two guards to the door of the yard where the massacre was taking place; on her way there, the agents of her father-in-law followed and again encouraged her to swear the oath, but she appeared not to hear them. When the door was finally opened and she was exposed to the sight of bloody corpses in the yard, she reportedly cried "Fi horreur!" ("fear be damned") or "I am lost!", and fell back, but was pulled out into the front of the yard by the two guards. Reportedly, the agents of her father-in-law were among the crowd, crying "Grâce! Grâce!", but were soon silenced with the shouts of "Death to the disguised lackeys of the Duc de Penthièvre!" One of the killers, who was tried years later, described her as "a little lady dressed in white", standing for a moment alone. Reportedly, she was first struck by a man with a pike on her head, which caused her hair to fall upon her shoulders, revealing a letter from Marie Antoinette which she had hidden in her hair; she was then wounded on the forehead, which caused her to bleed, after which she was stabbed to death by the crowd.

There are many different variations of the exact manner of her death, which attracted great attention and were used in propaganda for many years after the Revolution, during which it was embellished and exaggerated. Some reports, for example, allege that she was raped, and her breasts sliced off in addition to other bodily mutilations.

=== Treatment of remains ===
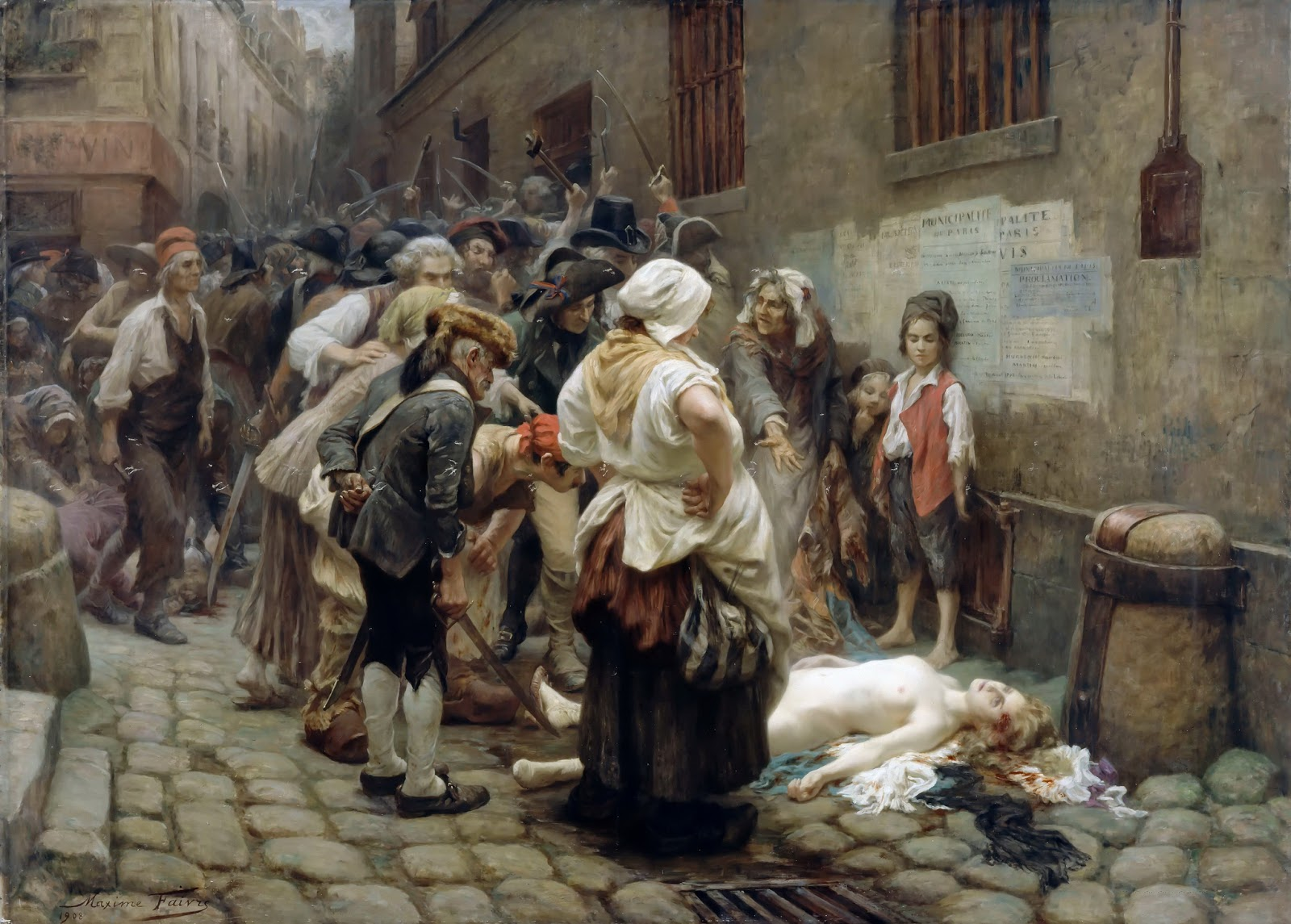
The death of the Princesse de Lamballe, by Leon Maxime Faivre in 1908 (Musée de la Révolution française)

The treatment of her remains has also been the subject of many conflicting stories. After her death, her corpse was reportedly undressed, eviscerated and decapitated, with its head placed upon a pike. It is confirmed by several witnesses that her head was paraded through the streets on a pike and her body dragged after by a crowd of people shrieking "La Lamballe! La Lamballe!". This procession was witnessed by a M. de Lamotte, who purchased a strand of her hair which he later gave to her father-in-law, as well as by the brother of Laure Junot.

Some reports say that the head was brought to a nearby café where it was laid in front of the customers, who were asked to drink in celebration of her death. Some reports state that the head was taken to a barber in order to dress the hair to make it instantly recognizable, though this has been contested. Following this, the head was put on the pike again and paraded beneath Marie Antoinette's window at the Temple.

Marie Antoinette and her family were not present in the room outside which the head was displayed at the time and thus did not see it. However, the wife of one of the prison officials, Madame Tison, saw it and screamed, upon which the crowd, hearing a woman scream from inside the Temple, assumed it was Marie Antoinette. Those who were carrying it wished her to kiss the lips of her favourite, as it was a frequent slander that the two had been lovers, but the head was not allowed to be brought into the building. The crowd demanded to be allowed inside the Temple to show the head to Marie Antoinette in person, but the officers of the Temple managed to convince them not to break into the prison. In Antonia Fraser's historical biography, Marie Antoinette: The Journey, Fraser claims Marie Antoinette did not actually see the head of her long-time friend, but was aware of what was occurring, stating, "...the municipal officers had had the decency to close the shutters and the commissioners kept them away from the windows...one of these officers told the king '...they are trying to show you the head of Madame de Lamballe'...Mercifully, the Queen then fainted away".

After this, the head and the corpse were taken by the crowd to the Palais-Royal, where the Duke of Orléans and his lover Marguerite Françoise de Buffon were entertaining a party of Englishmen for supper. The Duke of Orléans reportedly commented "Oh, it is Lamballe's head: I know it by the long hair. Let us sit down to supper", while Buffon cried out "O God! They will carry my head like that someday!"

The agents of her father-in-law, who had been tasked with acquiring her remains and having them temporarily buried until they could be interred in Dreux, reportedly mixed in with the crowd in order to be able to gain possession of it. They averted the intentions of the crowd to display the remains before the home of Marie Thérèse and her father-in-law at the Hôtel de Toulouse by saying that she had never lived there, but at the Tuileries or the Hôtel Louvois. When the carrier of the head, Charlat, entered an alehouse, leaving the head outside, one agent, Pointel, took the head and had it interred at the cemetery near the Hospital of the Quinze Vingts.

While the procession of the head is not questioned, the reports regarding the treatment of her body have been questioned. Five citizens of the local section in Paris, Hervelin, Quervelle, Pouquet, Ferrie, and Roussel delivered her body (minus her head, which was still being displayed on a pike) to the authorities shortly after her death. Royalist accounts of the incident claimed her body was displayed on the street for a full day, but this is not likely, as the official protocols explicitly state that it was brought to the authorities immediately after her death. While the state of the body is not described, there is, in fact, nothing to indicate that it was disembowelled, or even undressed: the report recounts everything she had in her pockets when she died, and indicate that her headless body was brought fully dressed on a wagon to the authorities in the normal way, rather than being dragged disembowelled along the street, as sensationalist stories claimed.

Her body, like that of her brother-in-law Philippe Égalité, was never found. According to Madame Tussaud, she was ordered to make a death mask.

The Princesse de Lamballe was one of 37 women murdered during the September Massacres in Paris, and one of only two women outside of the La Salpêtrière to be killed, the other being Marie Gredeler of the Conciergerie.

== In media ==
The Princesse de Lamballe; a biography

The Princesse de Lamballe has been portrayed in several films and miniseries. Two of the more notable portrayals were by Anita Louise in W. S. Van Dyke's 1938 film Marie Antoinette, and by Mary Nighy in the 2006 film Marie Antoinette, directed by Sofia Coppola. In the 1989 miniseries La Révolution française she was played by Gabrielle Lazure. In the television series Marie Antoinette, which began airing in 2022, she is played by Jasmine Blackborow. She is also mentioned in the 1905 children's book A Little Princess--the main character, Sara, is fascinated with the French Revolution and recounts the Princess's death to her friend.

== Ancestry ==
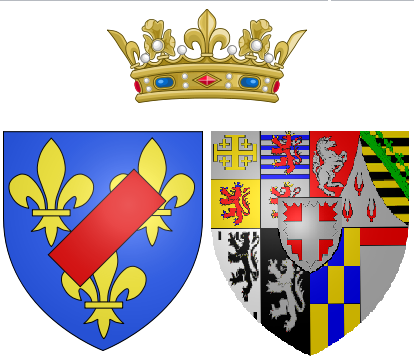
Arms of Maria Luisa of Savoy as Princess of Lamballe

Ancestors of Marie Thérèse Louise of Savoy, Princesse de Lamballe

8. Emmanuel Philibert, Prince of Carignano
4. Victor Amadeus I, Prince of Carignano
9. Princess Maria Caterina of Modena
2. Louis Victor, Prince of Carignano
10. Victor Amadeus II of Sardinia
5. Maria Vittoria, Marquise of Susa
11. Jeanne Baptiste d'Albert de Luynes
1. Princess Marie Thérèse Louise of Savoy
12. William, Landgrave of Hesse-Rotenburg
6. Ernest Leopold, Landgrave of Hesse-Rotenburg
13. Countess Maria Anna of Löwenstein-Wertheim-Rochefort
3. Princess Christine of Hesse-Rotenburg
14. Maximilian Karl Albert, Prince of Löwenstein-Wertheim-Rochefort
7. Countess Eleonore of Löwenstein-Wertheim-Rochefort
15. Countess Maria Polyxena Khuen of Lichtenberg and Belasi

Court offices
Preceded by Marie Anne de Bourbon (1697–1741)	Surintendante de la Maison de la Reine to the Queen of France; 1775–1792	Succeeded by None; office abolished.
