= Palazzo Carignano =

Historical building in the centre of Turin, Italy

Coordinates: 45°04′08″N 7°41′10″E

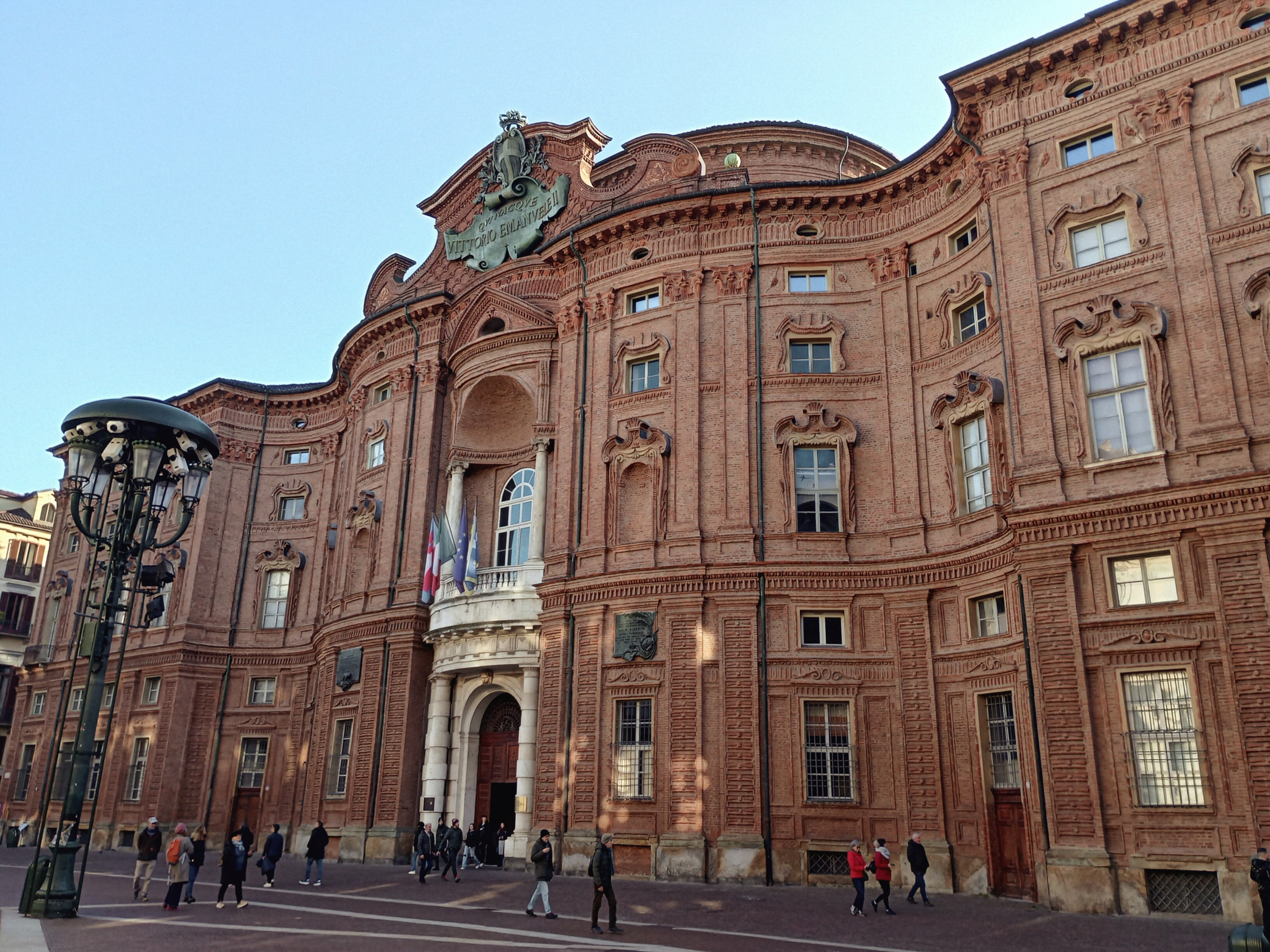
- The Baroque façade
- Interactive map of the Palazzo Carignano area

General information
- Architectural style: Baroque
- Location: Turin, Italy
- Construction started: 1679
- Client: Emmanuel Philibert, Prince of Carignano

Technical details
- Structural system: Brick

Design and construction
- Architect: Guarino Guarini

UNESCO World Heritage Site
- Criteria: (i) (ii) (iv) (v)
- Reference: 823bis
- Inscription: 1997 (21st Session)

Palazzo Carignano is a historical building in the centre of Turin, Italy, which houses the Museum of the Risorgimento. It was a private residence of the Princes of Carignano, after whom it is named. Its rounded façade is different from other façades of the same structure. It is located on the Via Accademia delle Scienze.

In 1997, it was placed on the UNESCO World Heritage Site list along with 13 other residences of the House of Savoy.

== History ==
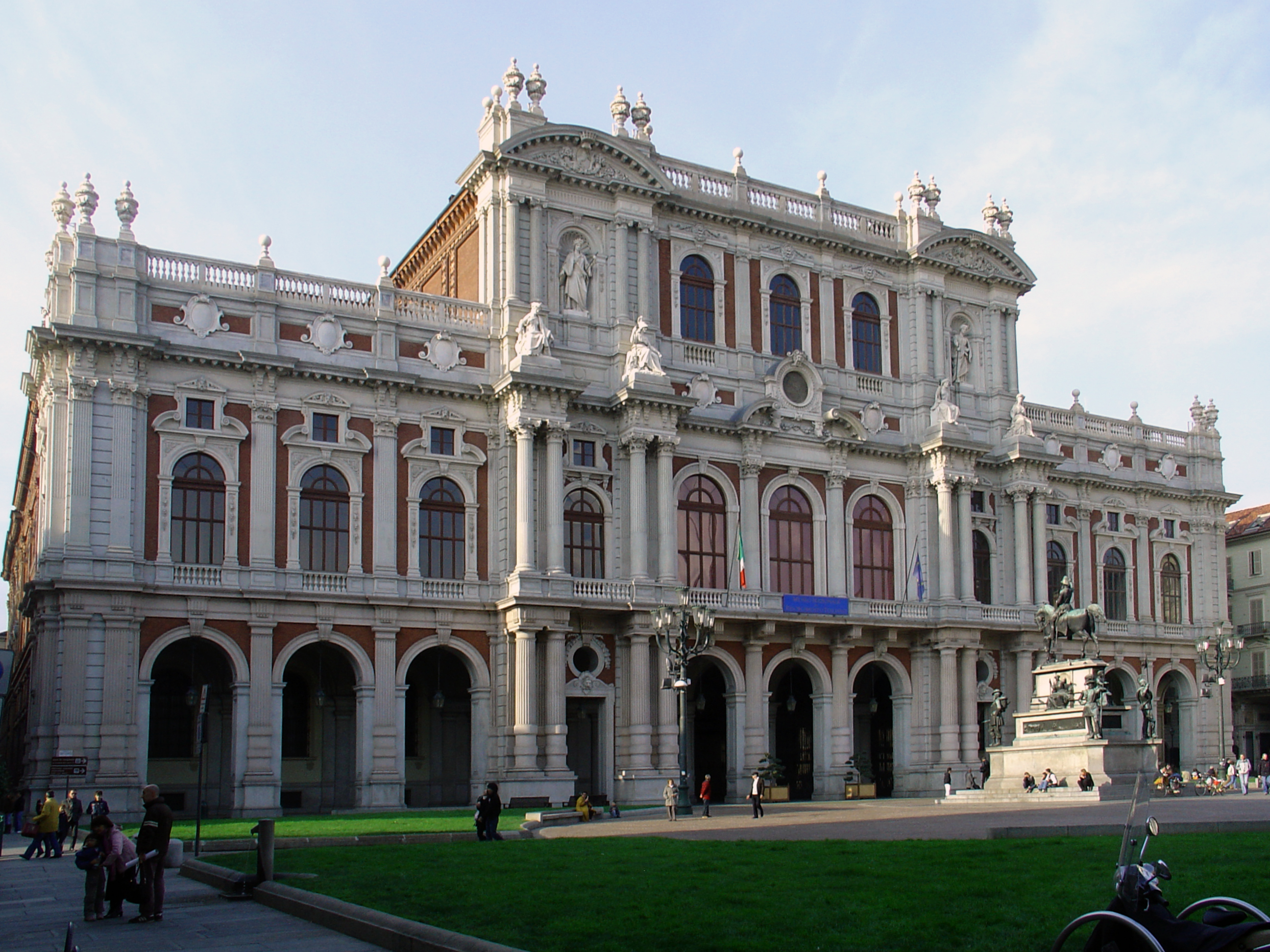
The 19th century rear façade of the Palazzo Carignano on Piazza Carlo Alberto.

The construction of the Palazzo Carignano was ordered by Emmanuel Philibert, Prince of Carignano. The Prince commissioned architect Guarino Guarini to design a suitable residence for his home and the cadet house of the reigning House of Savoy.

Guarini designed the structure in the shape of a square, with a straight and restrained east façade and an elliptical façade on the west. Guarini also added a forecourt at the centre of the palace. Construction began in 1679, when the Prince was 51 years old.

The decorations over the windows of the piano nobile recall the campaign of the Carignano family with Carignan-Salières Regiment against the Iroquois in 1667. The interior has been described as lavish and has impressive frescoes and stucco decorations.

Among the frescoes are some by Stefano Legnani, called il Legnanino. The main stairwell is decorated with busts by Pietro Somazzi.

The building, constructed in brick in a typical Baroque style, has an elliptical main façade. This façade represents the only example of civic architecture making use of the undulating 'concave – convex – concave' rhythm established by Francesco Borromini in the church of San Carlo alle Quattro Fontane in Rome.

The palazzo was the birthplace of Marie-Louise, princesse de Lamballe in 1749 – confidant of Marie Antoinette and for whom she died in 1792. Charles Emmanuel, Prince of Carignano was born there in 1770. It was also the birthplace of the first King of Italy, Victor Emmanuel II in 1820.

From 1848 to 1861, the palace was used as the Chamber of Deputies of the Parliament of the Kingdom of Sardinia in the baroque ballroom. In 1861, with the creation of the parliament of the newly unified Kingdom of Italy, the room was not large enough to host the Chamber of Deputies, which was moved in a new chamber built in the courtyard (this second chamber is not extant anymore).

== See also ==
- List of Baroque residences
