= Princess Marie Eleonore of Hesse-Rotenburg =

Maria Eleonore
- Countess Palatine of Sulzbach
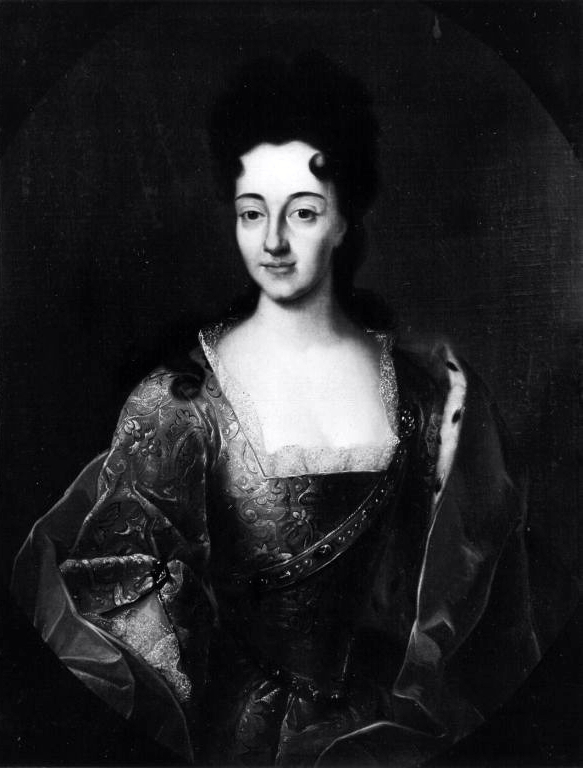
- Born: 15 September 1675; Rheinfels, Hesse
- Died: 27 January 1720 (aged 44); Sulzbach
- Spouse: Theodore Eustace of Sulzbach
- Issue: Count Palatine Joseph Charles; Francisca Christina, Abbess of Essen; Ernestine, Landgravine of Hesse-Rotenburg; John Christian, Count Palatine of Sulzbach; Anne Christine, Princess of Piedmont
- House: House of Hesse
- Father: William, Landgrave of Hesse-Rotenburg
- Mother: Maria Anna of Löwenstein-Wertheim

Princess Maria Eleonore of Hesse-Rotenburg (Maria Eleonore Amalia; 15 September 1675 – 27 January 1720) was Landgravine of Hesse-Rotenburg by birth and was the Countess Palatine of Sulzbach by marriage.

== Biography ==
Maria Eleonore was the second child of William, Landgrave of Hesse-Rotenburg and his wife Countess Maria Anna of Löwenstein-Wertheim-Rochefort. She was an older sister of Ernest Leopold of Hesse-Rotenburg, future ruler of her native Hesse-Rotenburg.

Engaged to Theodore Eustace of Sulzbach, the heir of the ruling Count Palatine of Sulzbach Christian Augustus, the couple were married on 9 June 1692 in Lobositz, Bohemia. The couple had some nine children three of which would have further progeny. Princess Maria Eleonore died in Sulzbach at the age of 44.

== Issue ==
1. Countess Palatine Amalia Auguste Maria Anna of Sulzbach (7 June 1693 – 18 January 1762) died unmarried.
2. Count Palatine Joseph Charles of Sulzbach (2 November 1694 – 18 July 1729) married Elisabeth Auguste of Neuburg and had issue.
3. Countess Palatine Francisca Christina of Sulzbach (16 May 1696 – 16 July 1776) Abbess of Essen.
4. Countess Palatine Ernestine Elizabeth Johanna of Sulzbach (15 May 1697 – 14 April 1775) married William II, Landgrave of Hesse-Wanfried-Rheinfels, no issue.
5. Count Palatine John William Philip of Sulzbach (3 June 1698 – 12 April 1699) died in infancy.
6. John Christian, Count Palatine of Sulzbach (23 January 1700 – 20 July 1733) married Maria Henriette de La Tour d'Auvergne and had issue; married Eleonore of Hesse-Rotenburg, no issue.
7. Countess Palatine Elisabeth Eleonore Auguste of Sulzbach (19 April 1702 – 10 February 1704) died in infancy.
8. Countess Palatine Anne Christine of Sulzbach (5 February 1704 – 12 March 1723) married Charles Emmanuel, Prince of Piedmont and had issue.
9. Count Palatine Johann Wilhelm August of Sulzbach (21 August 1706 – 28 August 1708) died in infancy.
