= Anne Christine of Sulzbach, Princess of Piedmont =

Anne Christine of Sulzbach
- Princess of Piedmont
- Born: 5 February 1704; Palace of Sulzbach-Rosenberg
- Died: 12 March 1723 (aged 19); Royal Palace of Turin, Turin
- Burial: Basilica of Superga, Turin, Italy
- Spouse: Charles Emmanuel of Savoy, Prince of Piedmont
- Issue: Prince Vittorio Amedeo Theodore of Savoy
- House: Wittelsbach
- Father: Theodore Eustace, Count Palatine of Sulzbach
- Mother: Maria Eleonore of Hesse-Rotenburg

Anne Christine of Sulzbach (Anne Christine Louise; 5 February 1704 – 12 March 1723), also called Christine of the Palatinate, was a princess of the Bavarian Circle of the Holy Roman Empire and first wife of Charles Emmanuel of Savoy, Prince of Piedmont, heir to the throne of the kingdom of Sardinia. Via marriage she became the Princess of Piedmont. She died during childbirth at the age of 19.

== Biography ==
Anne Christine Louise was born a Countess Palatine of Sulzbach. She was the daughter of Theodore Eustace, Prince Palatine of Sulzbach, the head of a Roman Catholic cadet branch of Bavaria's Wittelsbach dynasty, and Princess Eleonore of Hesse-Rheinfels-Rotenburg, daughter of William, Landgrave of Hesse-Rotenburg. Her parents had married in 1692, Anne Christine being their eighth child.

Christine's older brother John Christian succeeded their father as Prince Palatine, also becoming Margrave jure uxoris of Berg-op-Zoom: His son, Charles Theodore, Elector of Bavaria, was the last of the senior branch of the House of Wittelsbach. Her older sister Francisca Christina became Princes-Abbess of Thorn and, later, of the more important immediate convent of Essen. Christine was a first cousin of her husband's subsequent wife Polyxena of Hesse, Queen consort of Sardinia, of Caroline of Hesse, Princess de Condé, and of Christine of Hesse, Princess di Carignano.

On 15 March 1722 at Vercelli, she married Charles Emmanuel of Savoy, Prince of Piedmont and later King of Sardinia as Charles Emmanuel III. He was the second son of Victor Amadeus II, Duke of Savoy, King of Sardinia and Anne Marie d'Orléans and had been heir apparent to the Savoyard throne since 1715 at the death of Victor Amadeus, Prince of Piedmont. The following year, she gave birth to a son who was created the Duke of Aosta. She died a few days later on 12 March 1723 at the age of nineteen in Turin. Her only child died in 1725 in his second year, thus she left no direct descendants. She was buried at Turin Cathedral and was moved to the Basilica of Superga in Turin in 1786.

== Issue ==
- Prince Vittorio Amedeo Theodore of Savoy (7 March 1723 – 11 August 1725), died in infancy; buried at Superga.

== Ancestry ==
Ancestors of Anne Christine of Sulzbach, Princess of Piedmont

8. Augustus, Count Palatine of Sulzbach
4. Christian Augustus, Duke of Sulzbach
9. Duchess Hedwig of Holstein-Gottorp
2. Theodore Eustace, Prince Palatine of Sulzbach
10. John VII, Count of Nassau-Siegen
5. Countess Amalie of Nassau-Siegen
11. Margaret of Schleswig-Holstein-Sonderburg
1. Countess Palatine Anne Christine of Sulzbach
12. Ernest, Landgrave of Hesse-Rotenburg
6. William, Landgrave of Hesse-Rotenburg
13. Countess Maria Elenore of Solms-Hohensolms
3. Landgravine Eleonore Maria Amalie of Hesse-Rotenburg
14. Ferdinand Karl, Count of Löwenstein-Wertheim-Rochefort
7. Countess Maria Anna Franziska of Löwenstein-Wertheim-Rochefort
15. Landgravine Anna Maria of Fürstenberg
