= Princess of Piedmont =

The title Princess of Piedmont (Principessa di Piemonte) is usually a temporary title held by the wife of the Crown Prince. Once he becomes Duke of Savoy or King her title also changes.

== Princesses of Piedmont ==
Picture	Name	Father	Birth	Marriage	Became Princess	Ceased to be Princess	Death	Husband
	Princess Christine Marie of France	Henry IV of France (Bourbon)	10 February 1606	10 February 1619		26 July 1630 became Duchess of Savoy	27 December 1663	Prince Victor Amadeus
	Countess Palatine Anne Christine of Sulzbach	Theodore Eustace, Count Palatine of Sulzbach (Wittelsbach)	5 February 1704	15 March 1722		12 March 1723 death in childbirth		Prince Charles Emmanuel
	Landgravine Polyxena of Hesse-Rotenburg	Ernest Leopold, Landgrave of Hesse-Rotenburg (Hesse-Kassel)	21 September 1706	20 August 1724		3 September 1730 became Queen of Sardinia	13 January 1735	Prince Charles Emmanuel
	Infanta Maria Antonia of Spain styled as Duchess of Savoy	Philip V of Spain (Bourbon)	17 November 1729	31 May 1750		20 February 1773 became Queen of Sardinia	19 September 1785	Duke Victor Amadeus
	Princess Clothilde of France	Louis, Dauphin of France (Bourbon)	23 September 1759	27 August 1775		14 October 1796 became Queen of Sardinia	7 March 1802	Prince Charles Emmanuel
	Archduchess Adelaide of Austria styled as Duchess of Savoy	Archduke Rainer Joseph of Austria (Habsburg-Lorraine)	3 June 1822	12 April 1842		23 March 1849 became Queen of Sardinia	20 January 1855	Prince Victor Emmanuel
	Princess Margherita of Savoy	Prince Ferdinand, Duke of Genoa (Savoy)	20 November 1851	21 April 1868		9 January 1878 became Queen of Italy	4 January 1926	Prince Umberto
	Princess Elena of Montenegro	Nicholas I of Montenegro (Petrović-Njegoš)	8 January 1873	24 October 1896		29 July 1900 became Queen of Italy	28 November 1952	Prince Victor Emmanuel
	Princess Marie José of Belgium	Albert I of Belgium (Saxe-Coburg and Gotha)	4 August 1906	8 January 1930		9 May 1946 became Queen of Italy	27 January 2001	Prince Umberto

== See also ==
- List of Savoyard consorts
- List of Sardinian consorts
- List of Italian consorts
