= Princess Victoria of Hesse-Rotenburg =

Victoria of Hesse-Rotenburg
- Princess of Soubise
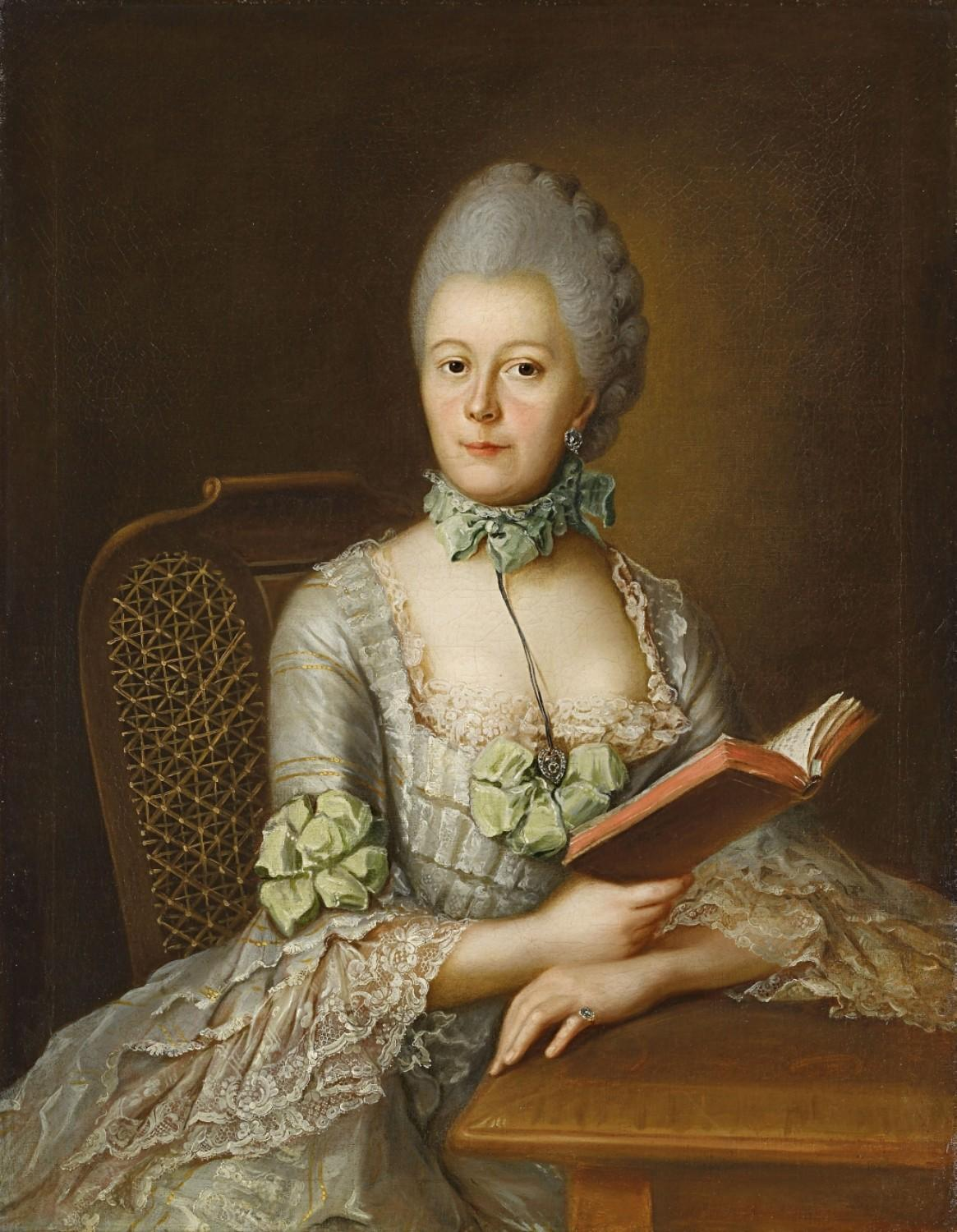
- Portrait by Johann Heinrich Tischbein
- Born: 25 February 1728; Rotenburg an der Fulda, Hesse-Rotenburg
- Died: 1 July 1792 (aged 64); Paris, France
- Burial: Rotenburg Castle, Germany
- Spouse: Charles, Prince of Soubise (m. 1745; died 1787)
- Father: Joseph, Hereditary Prince of Hesse-Rotenburg
- Mother: Christina of Salm

Princess Victoria of Hesse-Rotenburg (Anna Victoria Maria Christina; 25 February 1728 – 1 July 1792) was a princess of Hesse by birth, and the Princess of Soubise by marriage. Her husband was a renowned French commander, known as the Maréchal de Soubise. She died without descendants.

== Early life ==
Born in Rotenburg an der Fulda to Joseph, Hereditary Prince of Hesse-Rotenburg and his wife Princess Christine Anna Luise Oswaldine of Salm, she was the eldest of four children.

== Marriage ==
She married Charles de Rohan, prince de Soubise on 23 December 1745 at the château des Rohan in Saverne. He was head of the cadet branch of the wealthy and powerful House of Rohan, which, enjoyed the rank of princes étrangers at the court of Versailles.

== Later life ==
Her husband was a two-time widower, having been married, firstly, to Anne Marie Louise de La Tour d'Auvergne (1722–1739), and, secondly, to Princess Anne Thérese of Savoy-Carignan (1717–1745). Victoire had two step-daughters from these marriages; Charlotte, future Princess of Condé and Madame de Guéméné, who became governess of the children of Louis XVI.

Among her first cousins were King Victor Amadeus III of Sardinia and the tragic princesse de Lamballe.

Like her husband, she took lovers outside her marriage. In 1757, by order of Louis XV, she was arrested in Tournai, purportedly for having stolen 900,000 livres' worth of jewels from her husband in order to run away with her apparent lover, Monsieur de Laval-Montmorency.

The couple separated and her parents were given a pension of 24,000 livres to take Victoire, exiled from court, to dwell with them at Echternach. The couple had no children and Victoire died in Paris, having outlived her husband by five years to the day.

== Ancestry ==
Ancestors of Princess Victoria of Hesse-Rotenburg

16. Ernest, Landgrave of Hesse-Rheinfels-Rotenburg
8. William, Landgrave of Hesse-Rotenburg
17. Marie Eleonore of Solms-Hohensolms
4. Ernest Leopold, Landgrave of Hesse-Rotenburg
18. Ferdinand Karl, Count of Löwenstein-Wertheim-Rochefort
9. Countess Maria Anna of Löwenstein-Wertheim-Rochefort
19. Countess Anna Maria of Fürstenberg-Heiligenberg
2. Joseph, Hereditary Prince of Hesse-Rotenburg
20. Ferdinand Karl, Count of Löwenstein-Wertheim-Rochefort =18
10. Maximilian Karl, Prince of Löwenstein-Wertheim-Rochefort
21. Countess Anna Maria of Fürstenberg-Heiligenberg =19
5. Countess Eleonore of Löwenstein-Wertheim-Rochefort
22. Mathias Khuen, Count von Lichtenberg und Gandegg
11. Countess Maria Polyxena Khuen von Lichtenberg
23. Countess Anna Susanna von Meggau zu Kreutzen
1. Princess Viktoria of Hesse-Rotenburg
24. Leopold Philip Charles, Prince of Salm
12. Charles Theodore, Prince of Salm
25. Countess Maria Anna of Bronckhorst-Anholt
6. Louis Otto, Prince of Salm
26. Edward, Count Palatine of Simmern
13. Princess Palatine Luise Marie
27. Princess Anna of Mantua
3. Christina of Salm
28. Johann Ludwig, Prince of Nassau-Hadamar
14. Maurice Henry, Prince of Nassau-Hadamar
29. Countess Ursula of Lippe
7. Princess Albertine of Nassau-Hadamar
30. Salentin Ernst, Count of Manderscheid-Blankenheim
15. Countess Anna Luise of Manderscheid-Blankenheim
31. Countess Ernestine Salentine of Sayn-Wittgenstein-Sayn
