= Maria Henriette de La Tour d'Auvergne =

Maria Henriette
- Hereditary Princess of Sulzbach; Margravine of Bergen op Zoom
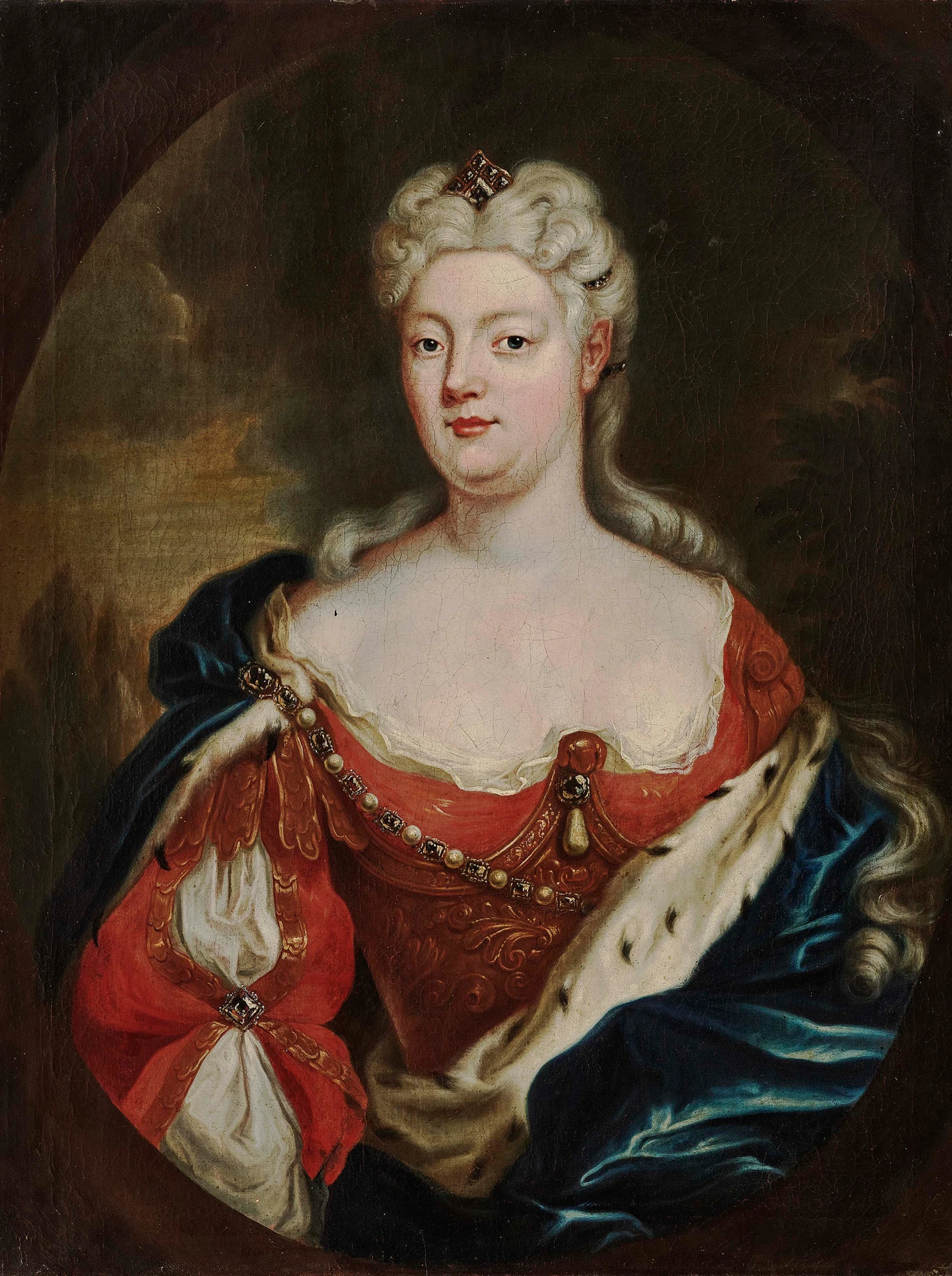
- Born: 24 November 1708; France
- Died: 28 July 1728 (aged 19); Hilpoltstein, Germany
- Spouse: Count Palatine John Christian of Sulzbach
- Issue Detail: Charles Theodore; Maria Anne
Names
- Maria Anna Henriette Leopoldine
- Father: François Egon de La Tour d'Auvergne
- Mother: Maria Anne de Ligne d'Arenberg

Maria Henriette de La Tour d'Auvergne (Maria Anna Henriette Leopoldine; 24 October 1708 – 28 July 1728) was a noblewoman born into the House of La Tour d'Auvergne. She was the suo jure Margravine of Bergen op Zoom from 1710 at the death of her father. She was the mother of Charles Theodore, Elector of Bavaria.

== Biography ==
Born in France, she was the only child of François-Egon de La Tour d'Auvergne and his wife, Maria Anne de Ligne, daughter of Philippe Charles de Ligne d'Arenberg, Duke of Arenberg. As a member of the House of La Tour d'Auvergne, she was entitled to the style of Her Highness as she was a male line descendant of the family.

Through her father, her cousins included Anne Marie Louise de La Tour d'Auvergne, princesse de Soubise, wife of the Maréchal de Soubise; the Duke of Bouillon. Her sister-in-law was Anne Christine Louise of Bavaria, the Princess of Piedmont and wife of Charles Emmanuel, Prince of Piedmont.

On 15 February 1722, she married Count Palatine John Christian of Sulzbach, the son of Theodore Eustace, Count Palatine of Sulzbach and his wife Maria Eleonore of Hesse-Rothenburg. The couple had two children: a son in 1724 and a daughter in 1728. She died at Hilpoltstein at the age of 19, a month after the death of her daughter.

In 1731, four years after her death, her husband married Eleonore of Hesse-Rotenburg, a daughter of Ernest Leopold, Landgrave of Hesse-Rotenburg and Eleonore of Löwenstein-Wertheim-Rochefort. The couple had no children. She has descendants only through her son's illegitimate issue, including the Polish Counts Raczynski.

== Issue ==
- Count Palatine Charles Philip Theodore of Sulzbach (11 December 1724 – 16 February 1799) married Countess Elizabeth Augusta of Sulzbach, no issue; married again to Archduchess Maria Leopoldine of Austria-Este, no issue. Only illegitimate descendants exist.
- Countess Palatine Marie Anne Louise Henriette of Sulzbach (20 May 1728 – 25 June 1728) died in infancy
