= Joseph, Hereditary Prince of Hesse-Rotenburg =

Joseph
- Hereditary Prince of Hesse-Rotenburg
- Born: 23 September 1705; Langenschwalbach, Holy Roman Empire
- Died: 24 June 1744 (aged 38); Schloss Rotenburg, Germany
- Spouse: Christine of Salm
- Issue: Viktoria, Princess of Soubise; Ludovika, Duchess of Hoogstraeten
- Father: Ernest Leopold, Landgrave of Hesse-Rotenburg
- Mother: Eleonore of Löwenstein-Wertheim-Rochefort

Joseph of Hesse-Rotenburg (23 September 1705 – 24 June 1744) was the Hereditary Prince of Hesse-Rotenburg from his birth till his death in 1744. He was heir apparent to the Landgraviate of Hesse-Rotenburg.

== Biography ==
Born at Langenschwalbach, he was the eldest child of Ernest Leopold, Landgrave of Hesse-Rotenburg and his wife Eleonore of Löwenstein-Wertheim-Rochefort. He was Heir apparent to the Landgraviate of Hesse-Rotenburg from his birth, and held the title till his death.

His siblings included Polyxena, future Queen of Sardinia; Caroline, future Princess of Condé and wife of Louis Henri, Duke of Bourbon, Prime Minister of France. His youngest sister Christine was Princess of Carignan and mother of the princesse de Lamballe.

== Death ==
He died at the Palace of the Landgrave's in Rotenburg an der Fulda (Schloss Rotenburg). In 1753, his wife married again Nicolaus Leopold, Prince of Salm-Salm (1701-1770), but had no children. His youngest brother Constantine became Hereditary Prince and later became Landgrave of Hesse-Rotenburg.

== Marriage and issue ==
He married Princess Christine of Salm (1707-1775), daughter of Ludwig Otto, Prince of Salm, and his wife, Princess Albertine of Nassau-Hadamar (1679-1716) on 9 March 1726. The couple were married at Anholt and later produced four children, two of which would die young and one who would go on to have progeny:

1. Princess Victoria of Hesse-Rotenburg (25 February 1728 – 1 July 1792) married Charles, Prince of Soubise, no issue;
2. Princess Ludovika of Hesse-Rotenburg (18 April 1729 – 6 January 1800) married Friedrich Ernst Maximilian of Salm-Salm, Duke of Hoogstraeten, had issue;
3. Princess Leopoldine of Hesse-Rotenburg (1 October 1731 – ?) died in infancy;
4. Prince Ernest of Hesse-Rotenburg (28 May 1735 – 6 June 1742) died in infancy.

== Ancestry ==
Ancestors of Joseph, Hereditary Prince of Hesse-Rotenburg

8. Ernest, Landgrave of Hesse-Rotenburg
4. William, Landgrave of Hesse-Rotenburg
9. Marie Eleonore of Solms-Hohensolms
2. Ernest Leopold, Landgrave of Hesse-Rotenburg
10. Ferdinand Karl, Count of Löwenstein-Wertheim-Rochefort
5. Maria Anna of Löwenstein-Wertheim-Rochefort
11. Countess Anna Maria of Fürstenberg-Heiligenberg
1. Joseph of Hesse-Rotenburg
12. Ferdinand Karl, Count of Löwenstein-Wertheim-Rochefort (=10)
6. Maximilian Karl, Prince of Löwenstein-Wertheim-Rochefort
13. Countess Anna Maria of Fürstenberg-Heiligenberg (=11)
3. Countess Eleonore of Lowenstein-Wertheim-Rochefort
14. Mathias Khuen von Belasi, Count of Lichtenberg and Gandegg
7. Countess Polyxena Khuen von Belasi of Lichtenberg and Gandegg
15. Countess Anna Susanna von Meggau zu Kreutzen
