= Marie Eleonore =

Marie Eleonore is a feminine compound given name which may refer to:

- Marie Eleonore of Cleves (1550–1608), Duchess of Prussia by marriage
- Marie Eleonore of Brandenburg, Countess Palatine of Simmern (1607-1675), a princess of Brandenburg, Countess Palatine and regent of Simmern
- Marie Eleonore of Dietrichstein (1623–1687), German Countess of Kaunitz and Oppersdorf by her two marriages
- Princess Marie Eleonore of Hesse-Rotenburg (1675–1720), Landgravine of Hesse-Rotenburg by birth and Countess Palatine of Sulzbach by marriage
- Princess Marie Eleonore of Albania (1909–1956)

== See also ==
- Marie-Éléonore Godefroid (1778–1849), French artist
- Maria Eleonora of Brandenburg (1599–1655), Queen of Sweden
