= Theodore Eustace, Count Palatine of Sulzbach =

Theodore Eustace
- Count Palatine of Sulzbach
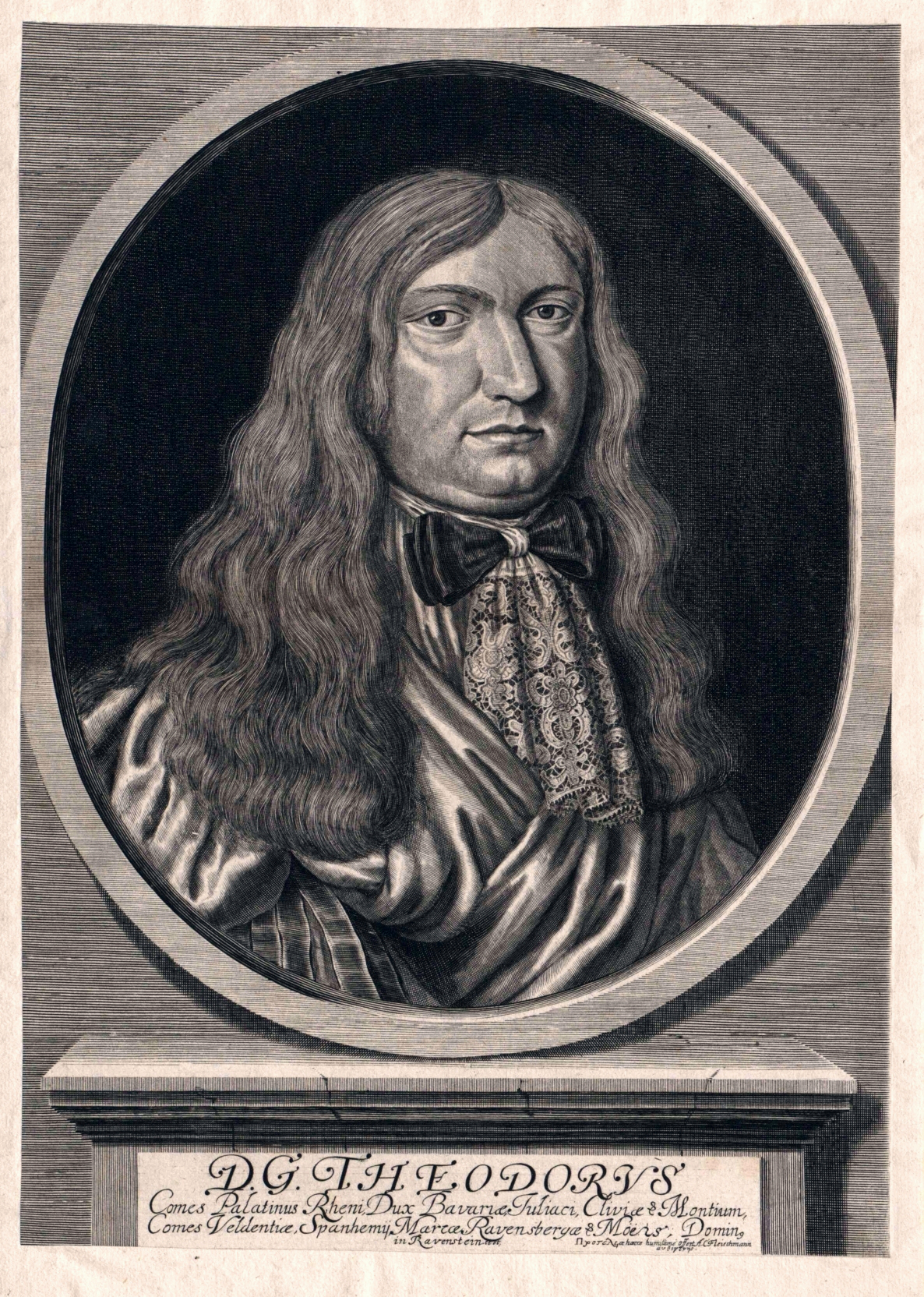
- Born: 14 February 1659; Sulzbach
- Died: 11 July 1732 (aged 73); Dinkelsbühl
- Spouse: Maria Eleonore of Hesse-Rotenburg
- Issue: Count Palatine Joseph Charles; Francisca Christina, Abbess of Essen; Ernestine, Landgravine of Hesse-Rotenburg; John Christian, Count Palatine of Sulzbach; Anne Christine of Sulzbach, Princess of Piedmont
- Father: Christian Augustus of Sulzbach
- Mother: Amalie of Nassau-Siegen

Theodore Eustace (German: Theodor Eustach; 14 February 1659 – 11 July 1732) was the Count Palatine of Sulzbach from 1708 until 1732.

== Life ==
Theodore Eustace was born in Sulzbach in 1659 as the only surviving son of Christian Augustus, Count Palatine of Sulzbach and Amalie of Nassau-Siegen. He died in Dinkelsbühl in 1732 and was buried in Sulzbach.

== Marriage ==
Theodore Eustace married Maria Eleonore of Hesse-Rothenburg (15 September 1675 – 27 January 1720), daughter of Landgrave William (sister of Ernest Leopold), and had the following children:

== Issue ==
1. Countess Palatine Amalia Auguste Maria Anna of Sulzbach (7 June 1693 – 18 January 1762) died unmarried.
2. Count Palatine Joseph Charles of Sulzbach (2 November 1694 – 18 July 1729) married Elisabeth Auguste of Neuburg and had issue.
3. Countess Palatine Francisca Christina of Sulzbach (16 May 1696 – 16 July 1776) Abbess of Essen.
4. Countess Palatine Ernestine Elizabeth Johanna of Sulzbach (15 May 1697 – 14 April 1775) married William II, Landgrave of Hesse-Wanfried-Rheinfels, no issue.
5. Count Palatine John William Philip of Sulzbach (3 June 1698 – 12 April 1699) died in infancy.
6. John Christian, Count Palatine of Sulzbach (23 January 1700 – 20 July 1733) married Maria Henriette de La Tour d'Auvergne and had issue; married Eleonore of Hesse-Rotenburg, no issue.
7. Countess Palatine Elisabeth Eleonore Auguste of Sulzbach (19 April 1702 – 10 February 1704) died in infancy.
8. Countess Palatine Anne Christine of Sulzbach (5 February 1704 – 12 March 1723) married Charles Emmanuel, Prince of Piedmont and had issue.
9. Count Palatine Johann Wilhelm August of Sulzbach (21 August 1706 – 28 August 1708) died in infancy.

Theodore Eustace, Count Palatine of Sulzbach House of Wittelsbach Born: 14 February 1659 Died: 11 July 1732
German royalty
Preceded by Christian Augustus	Count Palatine of Sulzbach; 1708–1732	Succeeded by John Christian Joseph
