= Louis Otto, Prince of Salm =

Louis Otto, Prince of Salm (24 October 1674 – 23 November 1738) was the Count of Salm-Salm from 1710, the only son of the Imperial chamberlain (Reichskämmerer) Charles Theodore, Prince of Salm (1645–1710) and Countess Palatine Luise Maria of Simmern (1647–1679).

== Family ==
Louis (Ludwig) Otto married Princess Albertine Johannette of Nassau-Hadamar (5 July 1679 – 11 June 1716) on 20 July 1700. She was a great-granddaughter of John VI, Count of Nassau-Dillenburg, brother of William the Silent. The couple had three children:

- Dorothea Franziska Agnes (21 January 1702 – 25 January 1751); married Nikolaus Leopold, Prince of Salm-Salm, who became the Prince of Salm-Salm, and has many descendants from his 18 children, including Princess Rosemary of Salm-Salm and Princess Isabella de Croÿ (both through his great-grandson Florentin, 4th Prince of Salm-Salm).
- Elisabeth Alexandrine Felicite Charlotte Gotfriede (21 July 1704 – 27 December 1739); married Claude Lamoral, 6th Prince de Ligne and had issue, including Charles-Joseph, 7th Prince of Ligne.
- Christine Anna Luise Oswaldine (29 April 1707 – 19 August 1775); married Joseph, Hereditary Prince of Hesse-Rotenburg; their eldest daughter Viktoria married Charles, Duc de Rohan-Rohan, the last male of the Soubise cadet branch of the French princely House of Rohan.

After the death of his aunt Anne Henriette of Bavaria, Princesse of Arches, he was opposed by his brother-in law, the Duke of Ursel. Eventually the duke obtained the rights to the principality, and his descendants still hold the title Prince d'Arches et de Charleville.

Ludwig Otto died in Anholt Castle in 1738. His death ended his branch (the altfürstliche line) of the House of Salm, since Ludwig Otto had no son as heir.

== See also ==
- Salm-Salm
- Salm (state)
