= Eleonore of Löwenstein-Wertheim =

Eleonore
- Landgravine of Hesse-Rotenburg
- Born: 16 February 1686; Vienna, Austria
- Died: 22 February 1753 (aged 67); Schloss Rotenburg, Rotenburg
- Spouse: Ernest Leopold of Hesse-Rotenburg
- Issue: Joseph, Hereditary Prince of Hesse-Rotenburg; Polyxena, Queen of Sardinia; Caroline, Princess of Condé; Constantine, Landgrave of Hesse-Rotenburg; Christine, Princess of Carignan; Eleonore, Countess Palatine of Sulzbach
Names
- Eleonore Maria Anna
- House: House of Hesse-Kassel; House of Löwenstein-Wertheim
- Father: Maximilian Karl Albert, Prince of Löwenstein-Wertheim-Rochefort
- Mother: Maria Polyxena Khuen of Lichtenberg

Eleonore of Löwenstein-Wertheim (Eleonore Maria Anna; 16 February 1686 – 22 February 1753) was a Princess of the Löwenstein-Wertheim-Rochefort. She was the Landgravine of Hesse-Rotenburg by marriage. Baptised as Eleonore Maria Anna, she was known as Eleonore.

== Early life ==
Born in Vienna, as a sixth child to Maximilian Karl Albert, Prince of Löwenstein-Wertheim-Rochefort and his wife, Countess Maria Polyxena Khuen of Lichtenberg and Belasi (1658-1712).

== Biography ==
Her father had entered imperial service at a young age, was an imperial counselor from 1684 thus her birth in Vienna, the capital of the Holy Roman Empire then ruled by Leopold I.

Her mother was a member of the family who ruled the County of Lichtenberg und Belasi. Her parents were first cousin's. She herself would marry her first cousin; Eleonore's paternal aunt Princess Maria Anna of Löwenstein-Wertheim-Rochefort had married William, Landgrave of Hesse-Rheinfels-Rotenburg, father of her husband Ernest Leopold of Hesse-Rotenburg, William's son and heir.

The couple married in Frankfurt on 9 November 1704, the bride being 18 and the groom 20. They were parents of 10 children, five of which would have progeny. She outlived her husband by three years.

Her eldest granddaughter, Princess Eleonora of Savoy, was named after her. Her eldest grandson was Victor Amadeus III of Sardinia.

== Issue ==
- Joseph of Hesse-Rotenburg, Hereditary Prince of Hesse-Rotenburg (1705–1744), married Princess Christina of Salm had issue.
- Polyxena of Hesse-Rotenburg, Queen of Sardinia, (1706–1735) married Charles Emmanuel III of Sardinia had issue.
- Wilhelmine Magdalene Leopoldina of Hesse-Rotenburg (1707–1708) died in infancy.
- Wilhelm of Hesse-Rotenburg (1708) died in infancy.
- Sophie of Hesse-Rotenburg (1709–1711) died in infancy.
- Franciscus Alexander of Hesse-Rotenburg (1710–1739) died unmarried.
- Eleonora of Hesse-Rotenburg (1712–1759) married John Christian, Count Palatine of Sulzbach no issue.
- Caroline of Hesse-Rotenburg (1714–1741) married Louis Henri de Bourbon had issue.
- Constantine of Hesse-Rotenburg, Landgrave of Hesse-Rotenburg (1716–1778), his successor
- Christine of Hesse-Rotenburg (1717–1778) married Louis Victor of Savoy and had issue.

== Ancestry ==
Ancestors of Eleonore of Löwenstein-Wertheim

8. Prince Johann Dietrich of Löwenstein-Wertheim-Rochefort
4. Ferdinand Karl, Count of Löwenstein-Wertheim-Rochefort
9. Countess Josina of de la Marck
2. Maximilian Karl, 1st Prince of Löwenstein-Wertheim-Rochefort
10. Egon VIII of Fürstenberg-Heiligenberg
5. Countess Anna Maria of Fürstenberg-Heiligenberg
11. Countess Anna Maria of Hohenzollern-Hechingen
1. Eleonore of Löwenstein-Wertheim-Rochefort
12. Count Jakob Khuen von Belasi-Lichtenberg und Gandegg
6. Mathias Khuen von Belasi, Count of Lichtenberg and Gandegg
13. Siguna Margaretha von Annenberg
3. Countess Polyxena Khuen von Belasi of Lichtenberg and Gandegg
14. Ferdinand Balthasar, Count of Meggau
7. Countess Anna Susanna von Meggau zu Kreutzen
15. Countess Esther of Sulz

== Sources ==
- Hans-Günter Kittelmann: Kleiner Führer durch die Rotenburger Quart 1627–1834 und das Fürstenhaus Hessen-Rotenburg. Geschichtsverein Altkreis Rotenburg. p. 28–43

Eleonore of Löwenstein-Wertheim House of Löwenstein-Wertheim Born: 16 February 1686 Died: 22 February 1753
German royalty
| Vacant Title last held by Eleonora of Solms-Lich | Landgravine consort of Hesse-Rotenburg; 20 November 1725 – 29 November 1749 | Succeeded by Maria Sophia of Starhemberg |
