= John Christian, Count Palatine of Sulzbach =

Count Palatine of Sulzbach (1732–1733)

John Christian
- Count Palatine of Sulzbach
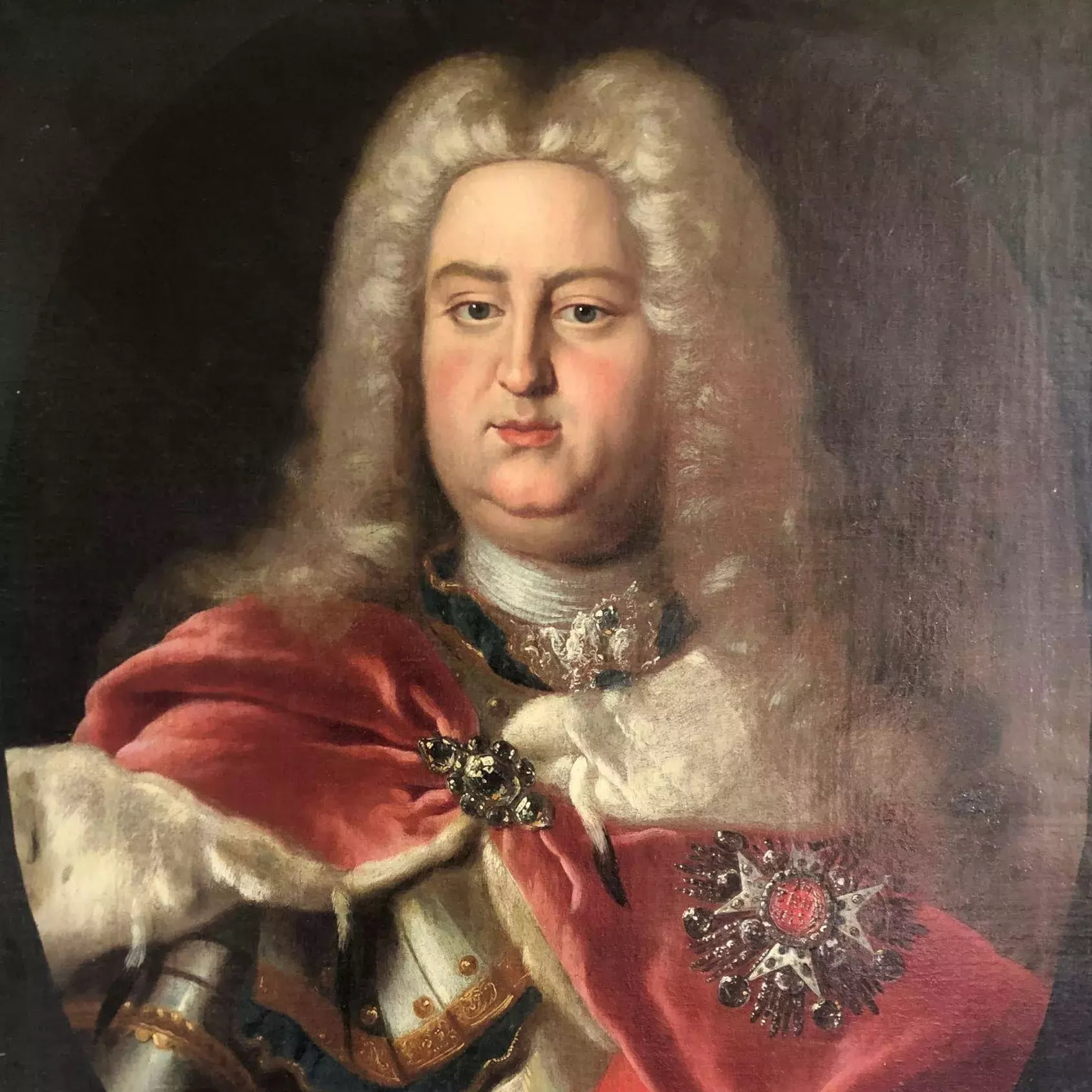
- Born: 23 January 1700; Sulzbach
- Died: 20 July 1733 (aged 33); Sulzbach
- Noble family: House of Wittelsbach
- Spouses: Marie Anne Henriëtte Leopoldine de La Tour d'Auvergne; Landgravine Eleonore of Hesse-Rotenburg
- Issue: Charles Theodore; Maria Anne
- Father: Theodore Eustace, Count Palatine of Sulzbach
- Mother: Eleonore Maria Amalia of Hesse-Rotenburg

John Christian (23 January 1700 – 20 July 1733; in German: Johann Christian Joseph) was the Count Palatine of Sulzbach from 1732 to 1733.

== Life ==
He was the second and youngest surviving son of duke Theodore Eustace, Count Palatine of Sulzbach with his consort Eleonore Maria Amalia of Hesse-Rotenburg. His elder brother was Joseph Charles, Count Palatine of Sulzbach. After the death of his elder brother Joseph Charles, John Christian Joseph became the eventual designated heir of the Electoral Palatine. In 1732, he succeeded his father as Count Palatine of Sulzbach but died in Sulzbach in 1733 before inheriting the Palatinate. Charles III Philip, Elector Palatine, a member of the Palatine Neuburg line of Wittelsbach failed to produce a legitimate male heir, and his brothers also. By 1716, it was evident that the Neuburg line would become extinct and that the Sulzbach branch would succeed them.

== Marriage ==
He married twice:

- Marie Anne Henriëtte Leopoldine de La Tour d'Auvergne (24 October 1708 – 28 July 1728), daughter of Francois Egon de la Tour d'Auvergne, Prince of Auvergne, and had the following children:
1. Charles Theodore (11 December 1724 – 16 February 1799); became Elector Palatine in 1742, and Elector of Bavaria in 1777
2. Maria Anne (30 May 1728 – 25 June 1728)
- Eleonore Philippina Christina Sophia of Hesse-Rotenburg (1712–1759); married in 1731 but had no issue.

== Ancestry ==
Ancestors of John Christian, Count Palatine of Sulzbach

16. Philip Louis, Count Palatine of Neuburg
8. Augustus, Count Palatine of Sulzbach
17. Anna of Cleves
4. Christian Augustus, Count Palatine of Sulzbach
18. John Adolf, Duke of Holstein-Gottorp
9. Hedwig of Schleswig-Holstein-Gottorp
19. Princess Augusta of Denmark
2. Theodore Eustace, Count Palatine of Sulzbach
20. John VI, Count of Nassau-Dillenburg
10. John VII, Count of Nassau-Siegen
21. Elisabeth of Leuchtenberg
5. Amalie of Nassau-Siegen
22. John II, Duke of Schleswig-Holstein-Sonderburg
11. Margaret of Schleswig-Holstein-Sonderburg
23. Elisabeth of Brunswick-Grubenhagen
1. John Christian, Count Palatine of Sulzbach
24. Maurice, Landgrave of Hesse-Kassel
12. Ernest, Landgrave of Hesse-Rheinfels
25. Juliane of Nassau-Siegen
6. William, Landgrave of Hesse-Rotenburg
26. Philip Reinhard I, Count of Solms-Hohensolms
13. Maria Eleonore of Solms-Hohensolms
27. Elisabeth of Wied
3. Maria Eleonore of Hesse-Rotenburg
28. John Theodore of Löwenstein-Wertheim-Rochefort
14. Ferdinand Karl, Count of Löwenstein-Wertheim-Rochefort
29. Josine of the Marck
7. Maria Anna Francisca of Löwenstein-Wertheim-Rochefort
30. Egon VIII of Fürstenberg-Heiligenberg
15. Anna Maria of Fürstenberg
31. Anna Maria of Hohenzollern-Hechingen

John Christian, Count Palatine of Sulzbach House of Wittelsbach Born: 23 January 1700 Died: 20 July 1733
German royalty
Preceded by Theodore Eustace	Count Palatine of Sulzbach; 1732–1733	Succeeded by Charles Theodore
