= Charles Theodore, Elector of Bavaria =

German nobleman (1724–1799)

Charles Theodore
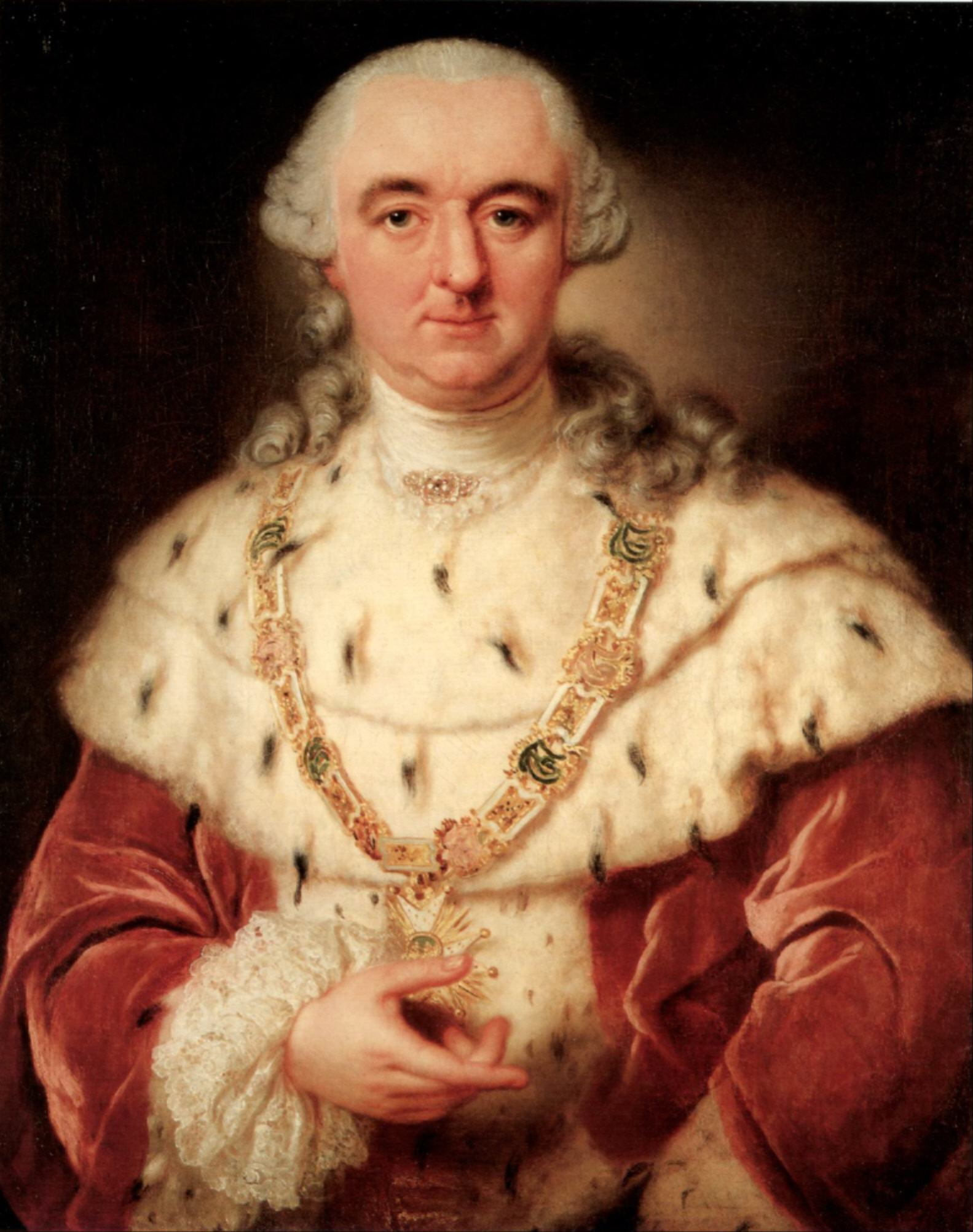
- Painted by Anna Dorothea Therbusch in 1763

Elector Palatine Count Palatine of Neuburg
- Reign: 31 December 1742 – 30 December 1777
- Predecessor: Charles III Philip

Elector of Bavaria Count Palatine of the Rhine
- Reign: 30 December 1777 – 16 February 1799
- Predecessor: Maximilian III Joseph
- Successor: Maximilian IV Joseph
- Born: 11 December 1724; Drogenbos, Brussels, Austrian Netherlands
- Died: 16 February 1799 (aged 74); Munich Residenz, Bavaria
- Burial: Theatine Church, Munich
- Spouse: Countess Palatine Elisabeth Augusta of Sulzbach (m. 1742; died 1794) Archduchess Maria Leopoldine of Austria-Este (m. 1795)
- Issue: (see below)
- House: House of Wittelsbach
- Father: John Christian, Count Palatine of Sulzbach
- Mother: Maria Henriette de La Tour d'Auvergne
- Religion: Catholicism

Charles Theodore (German: Karl Theodor; 11 December 1724 – 16 February 1799) was a German nobleman of the Sulzbach branch of the House of Wittelsbach. He became Count Palatine of Sulzbach at the age of six following the death of his father Johann Christian in 1733. With the death of his cousin, Charles III Philip, he became Prince-elector and Count Palatine of the Rhine in 1742, being eighteen. In his fifties, he became Prince-Elector of Bavaria at the death of another cousin, Maximilian III Joseph, in 1777.

== Family and ascent ==
Charles Theodore was born into Palatinate-Sulzbach branch of the House of Wittelsbach. His father was Johann Christian, who later became Count Palatine of Sulzbach. His mother was Marie-Anne-Henriette-Leopoldine de La Tour d'Auvergne, Margravine of Bergen op Zoom, a grandniece of Henri de La Tour d'Auvergne, Viscount of Turenne. He was born in Drogenbos near Brussels and educated in Mannheim.

Charles Theodore was the Margrave of Bergen op Zoom from 1728 onwards. He then succeeded his father as Count Palatine of Sulzbach in 1733 and inherited the Electoral Palatinate and the duchies of Jülich and Berg in 1742, with the death of Charles III Philip, Elector Palatine. To strengthen the union of all lines of the Wittelsbach dynasty Charles III Philip had organised a wedding on 17 January 1742 when his granddaughter Elizabeth Augusta was married to Charles Theodore and her sister Maria Anna to the Bavarian prince Clement.

As reigning prince-elector of the Palatinate, Charles Theodore founded an academy of science, stocking up the museums' collections and supporting the arts. When Maximilian III Joseph of Bavaria died in 1777, Charles Theodore became also elector and duke of Bavaria and moved to Munich.

== Bavarian succession ==
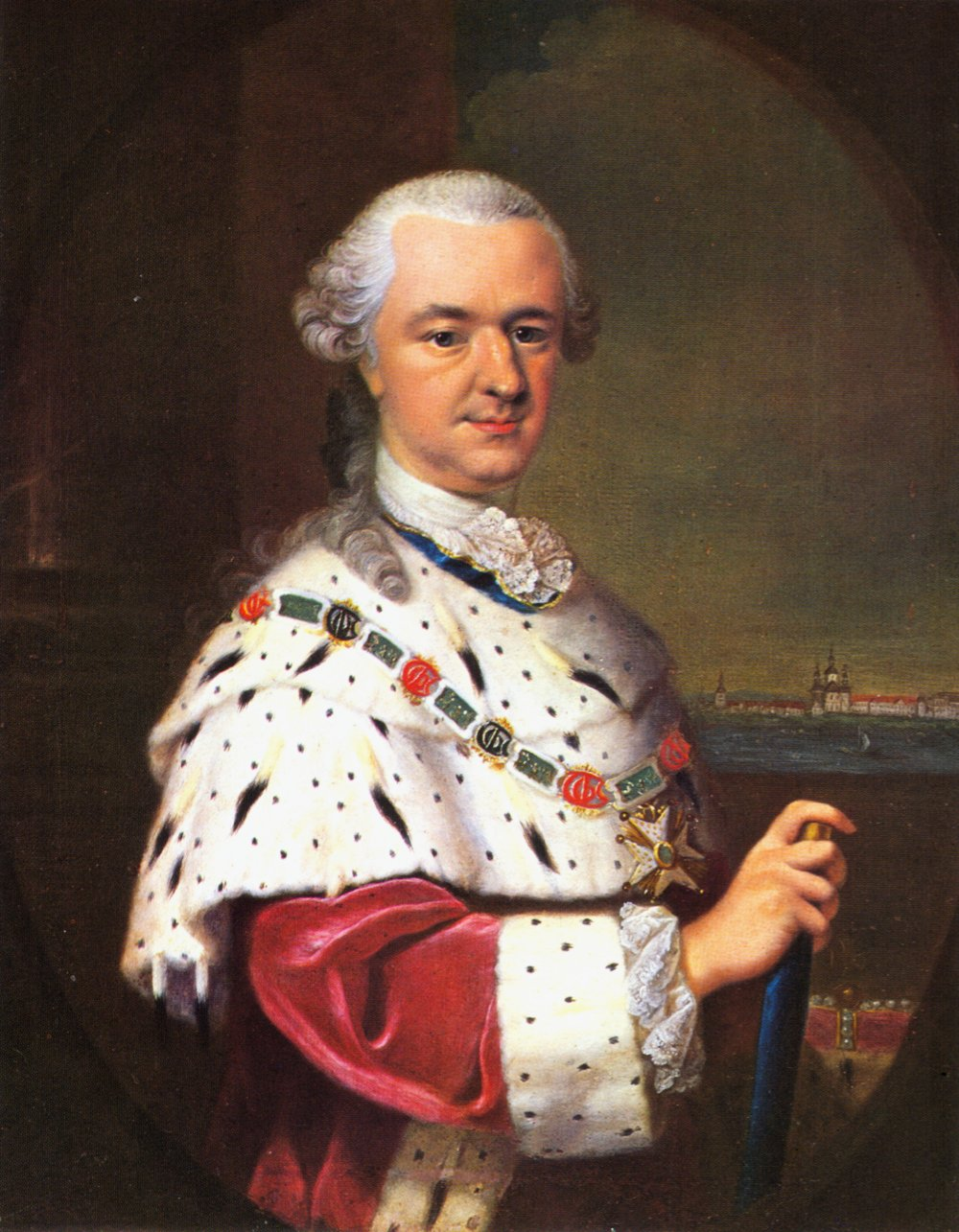
Charles Theodore

Charles Theodore did not immediately take up his new title. He had several mistresses and many illegitimate children. However, those children could inherit neither the Electorate of Bavaria nor that of the Palatinate; Charles Theodore needed territory that he could bequeath to his illegitimate children.

On 3 January 1778, shortly after the death of Max Joseph, Charles Theodore signed an agreement with Joseph II, Holy Roman Emperor to exchange southern Bavaria for part of the Austrian Netherlands.

The plan was strongly opposed by Maria Anna Sophia of Saxony, the widow of Max Joseph, and Charles Theodore's cousin Charles II August, Duke of Zweibrücken, the head of the House of Palatinate-Birkenfeld and the next heir of Bavaria and the Palatinate. They were supported by Frederick II of Prussia and most of the German minor states.

The ensuing diplomatic crisis led to the War of the Bavarian Succession, which was ended by the Peace of Teschen (1779). Charles Theodore accepted the Bavarian succession but agreed that his illegitimate descendants could not inherit Bavaria. Austria acquired the Innviertel, a part of Bavaria in the basin of the Inn River.

Charles Theodore had only one son, Franz Ludwig Josef, with his wife, Countess Elizabeth Augusta of Sulzbach, who died a day after birth. His wife died in 1794. In 1795, he married Maria Leopoldine of Austria-Este, Joseph's niece, but they had no children. A second proposal to exchange Bavaria for the Austrian Netherlands in 1784 also failed as Frederick II of Prussia initiated the Fürstenbund.

When Charles Theodore died, Bavaria and the Palatinate passed to his cousin, Max Joseph, Duke of Zweibrücken, the younger brother of Charles August, who had died in 1795.

In 1989, Marvin E. Thomas argued in Karl Theodor and the Bavarian Succession, 1777–1778 that Charles Theodore had wanted to maintain possession of his new territory, as is shown in his diplomatic correspondence. It is more widely understood that Charles Theodore continued the despotic and expensive habits he had developed as Elector Palatine.

=== Rule as elector of Bavaria ===
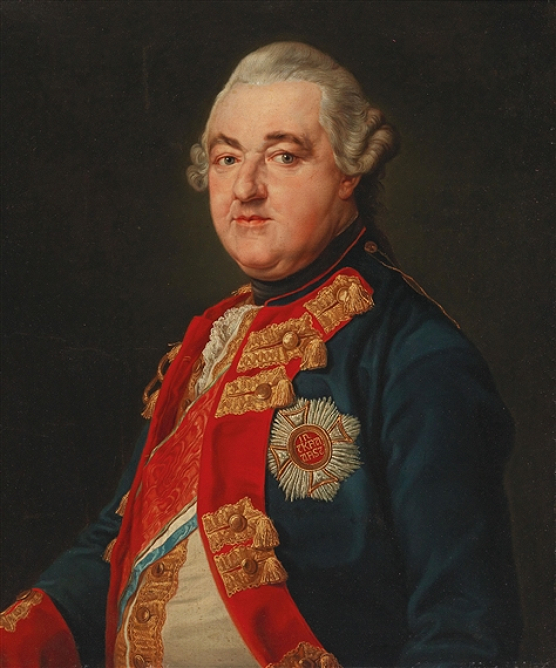
Charles Theodore as Elector of Bavaria, by Pompeo Batoni

Charles Theodore never became popular as a ruler in Bavaria, according to his critic Lorenz von Westenrieder. He attempted, without success, to exchange the electoral lands of Bavaria for the Austrian Netherlands and a royal crown, and he never managed to control the mounting social tensions in Bavaria. After a dispute with Munich's city council, he even moved the electoral residence in 1788 to Mannheim but returned only one year later.

In 1785, he appointed the American Loyalist exile Benjamin Thompson as his aide-de-camp and chamberlain. Over the next 11 years, Thompson reformed the Bavarian Army and many aspects of the state, rose to high ministerial rank with Charles Theodore's backing and became Count von Rumford.

Charles Theodore is also known for disbanding Adam Weishaupt's order of the Illuminati in 1785.

In 1794, the French Revolutionary Army occupied the Duchy of Jülich; in 1795, they invaded the Palatinate; and in 1796, they marched towards Bavaria. Charles Theodore begged Francis II for help that would have made Bavaria a puppet state of Austria. When he died of a stroke in Munich in 1799, the population in Munich celebrated for several days. He is buried in the crypt of the Theatinerkirche in Munich.

Despite the mutual dislike and distrust between the elector and his Bavarian subjects, Charles Theodore left a distinctive mark on the city of Munich. It was during his reign that the English Garden, Munich's largest park, was created, and the city's old fortifications were dismantled to make place for a modern, expanding city. One of Munich's major squares, Karlsplatz, is named after Charles Theodore. Munich natives, however, seldom use that name, calling the square instead Stachus, after the pub "Beim Stachus" that was located there until construction work for Karlsplatz began, mainly because Charles Theodore, as noted above, never enjoyed the popularity in Bavaria that he enjoyed in the Palatinate.

== Character ==
Silver thaler coin of Charles Theodore, 1778.
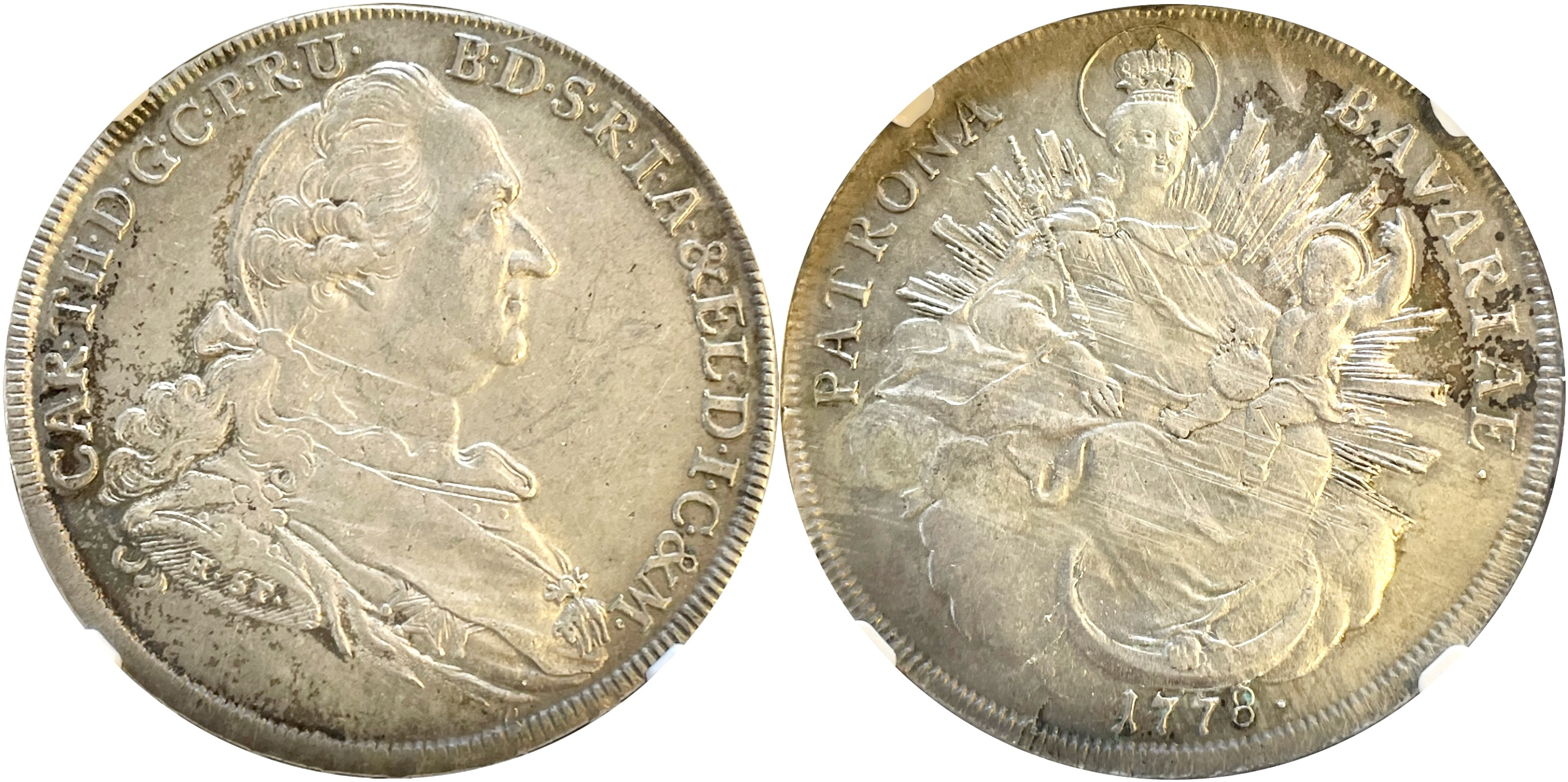
First side of the image: Obverse
CAR[OLUS] TH[EODORUS] D[EI] G[RATIA] C[OMES] P[ALATINUS] R[HENI] U[TRIUSQUE] B[AVARIAE] D[UX] S[ACRI] R[OMANI] I[MPERII] A[RCHIDAPIFER] & EL[ECTOR] D[UX] I[ULIACI] C[LIVIAE] & M[ONTIUM]."Charles Theodore, by the Grace of God, Count Palatine of the Rhine, Duke of both (Upper and Lower) Bavaria, Archsteward and Elector of the Holy Roman Empire, Duke of Jülich, Cleves and Berg." Right profile of Charles Theodor in armour with sash and decoration.
Second side of the image: Reverse
PATRONA BAVARIAE 1778. "Patroness of Bavaria 1778." Image of the crowned Virgin with the Christ child, bearing orb and sceptre, seated upon clouds before a sunburst, and treading on a crescent moon.

Charles Theodore was more interested in arts and philosophy than in politics. The British Victorian historian Thomas Carlyle referred to him as a "poor idle creature, of purely egoistical, ornamental, dilettante nature; sunk in theatricals, bastard children and the like; much praised by Voltaire, who sometimes used to visit him; and Collini, to whom he [Charles Theodore] is a kind master."

The French foreign minister, Charles Gravier, comte de Vergennes, knew him and described his foibles even more succinctly:

Although by nature intelligent, he has never succeeded in ruling by himself; he has always been governed by his ministers or by his father-confessor or (for a time) by the [E]lectress [his wife]. This conduct has increased his natural weakness and apathy to such a degree that for a long time he has had no opinions save those inspired in him by his entourage. The void which this indolence has left in his soul is filled with the amusements of the hunt and of music and by secret liaisons, for which His Electoral Majesty has at all times had a particular penchant.

In the course of his career, Charles Theodore acquired a celebrated secretary when the Florentine noble, Cosimo Alessandro Collini (1727–1806), who had been Voltaire's secretary, accepted his patronage and remained in the Palatinate. Although Charles Theodore certainly wished to acquire more territory, he had only illegitimate natural sons and so he preferred territory that he could dispose of through his testament, rather than territory encumbered by a legal entailment that he could pass only to a legitimate son.

== Cultural legacy ==
Charles Theodore was a great lover of the arts, including drama and especially music. His Mannheim court orchestra was considered one of the finest in its time. The Mannheim School (including composer Christian Cannabich and conductor Johann Stamitz) did groundbreaking work that the celebrated Wiener Klassik would later draw upon. Mozart applied for a position with the Mannheim orchestra in 1777, but was turned down, as the court was about to move to Munich. In 1780, Charles Theodore commissioned Idomeneo from the composer. Mozart quotes him as saying "No music has ever made such an impression on me. It is magnificent."

In keeping with the customs of the time, an Italian opera company as well as a troupe of French actors were employed at Mannheim, each performing in their respective tongues. Later, the Nationaltheater (national theatre) was established, one of the first theatres in Germany to exclusively showcase plays in the native tongue (most notably, the first staging of Schiller's "Die Räuber" in 1782).

In the visual arts, a massive collection of plaster casts taken from celebrated antique works was assembled at Mannheim. The pre-existing Düsseldorf gallery, including many works by Rubens, was first transferred to Mannheim, then to Munich, where it was later incorporated in the Alte Pinakothek. While none of the Mannheim painters are particularly notable today (with the possible exception of Kobell, primarily a master of landscapes), the elector had several highly talented sculptors at his disposal, among them Peter Anton von Verschaffelt, Peter Simon Lamine and Konrad Linck. Linck also distinguished himself as a designer of porcelain figurines at Frankenthal.

Charles Theodore's chief architect Nicolas de Pigage was charged to complete the Mannheim Palace, design the Schlosstheater and the gardens at Schwetzingen Palace (including numerous pavilions, among them several artificial "Roman" ruins and a "mosque") as well as Benrath palace. While these works are in a pure contemporary French style (marked by the transition from late Baroque to early classicism), some of the other architects employed by Charles Theodore were proponents of a more Italianate style. This mixture of influences is, in fact, typical of many German courts of the period. Charles Theodore was also responsible for the construction of the Old Bridge in Heidelberg, which bears his name as the Karl-Theodor-Brücke.

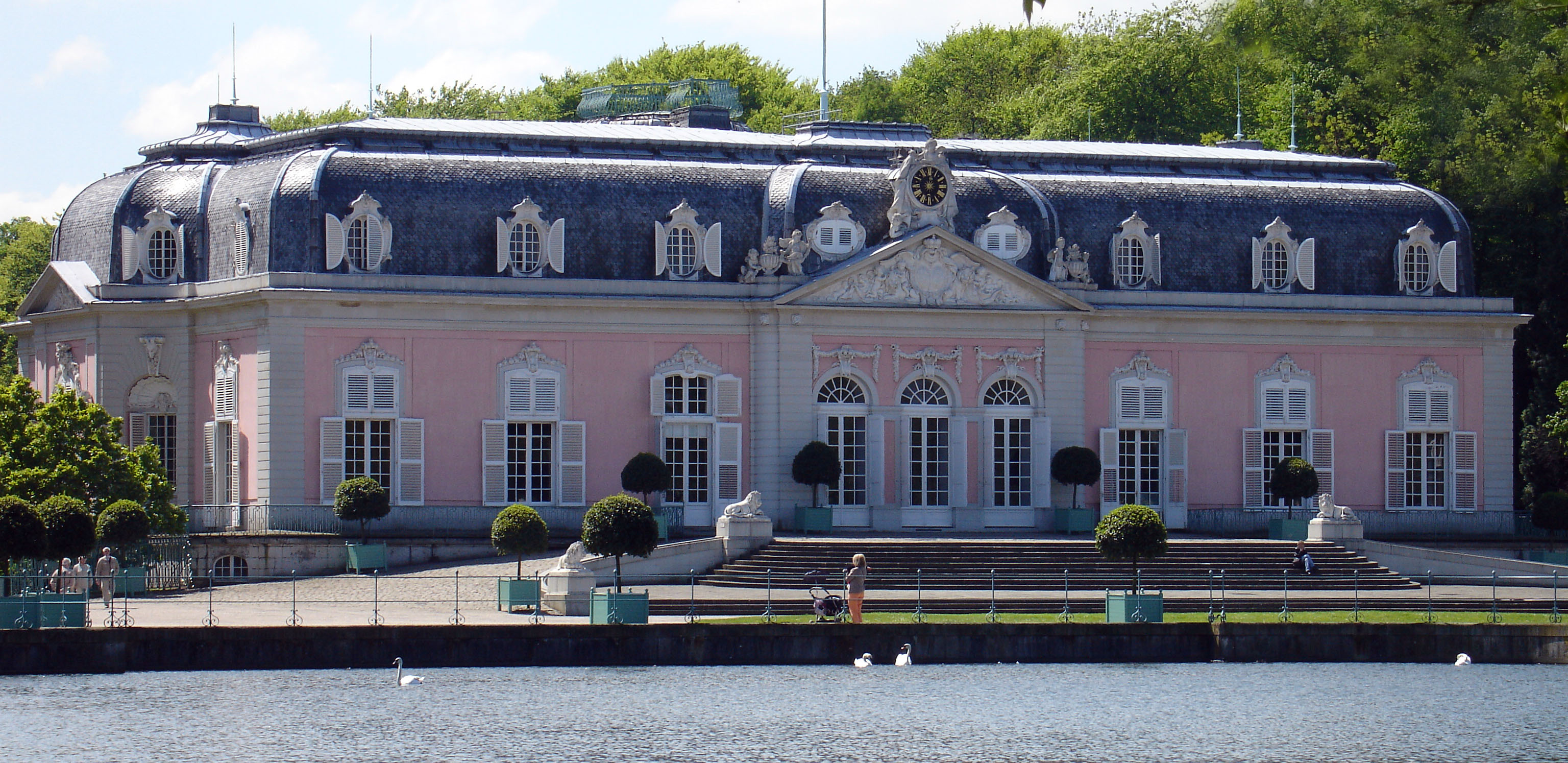
Schloss Benrath, Düsseldorf

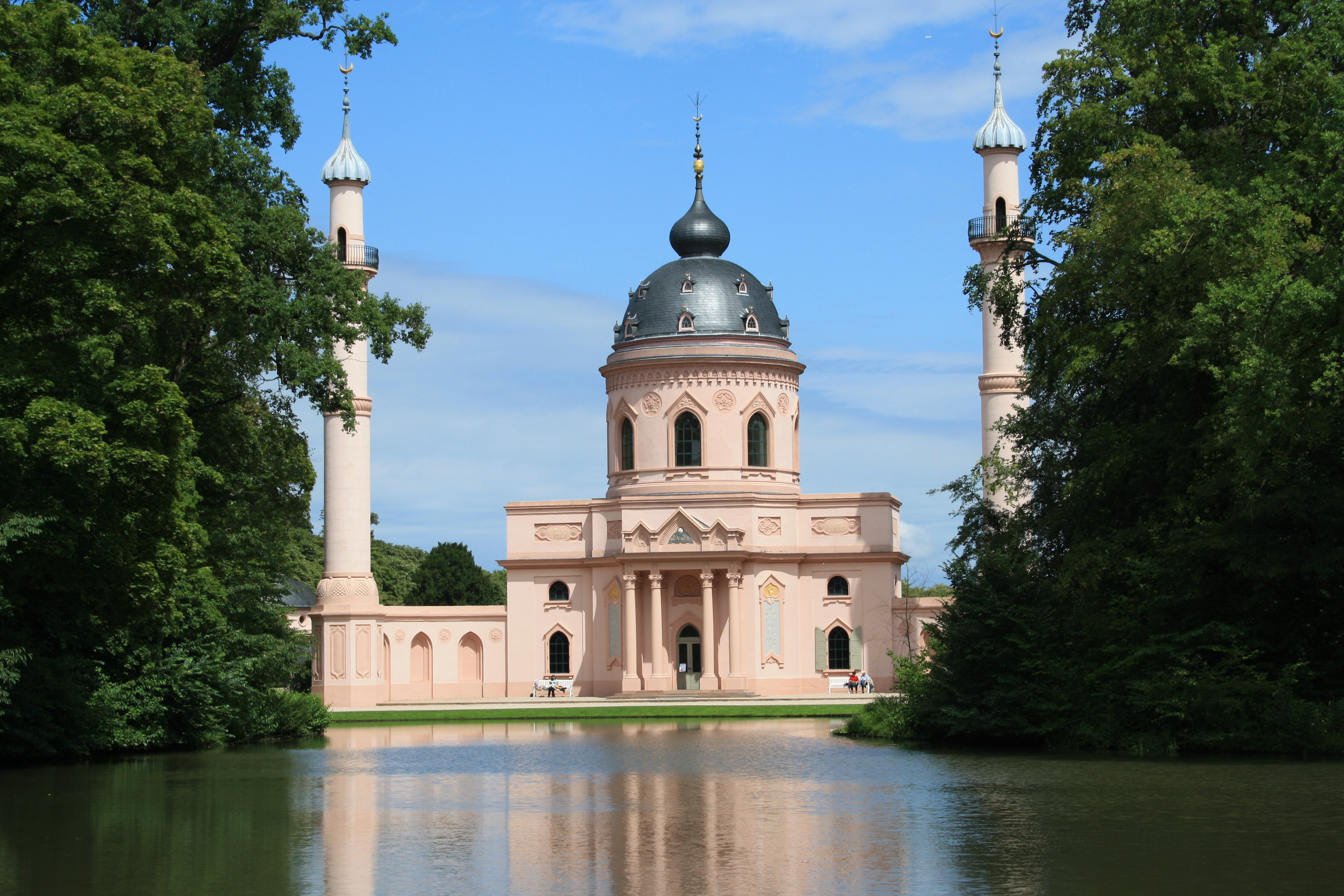
Mosque at Schwetzingen Castle

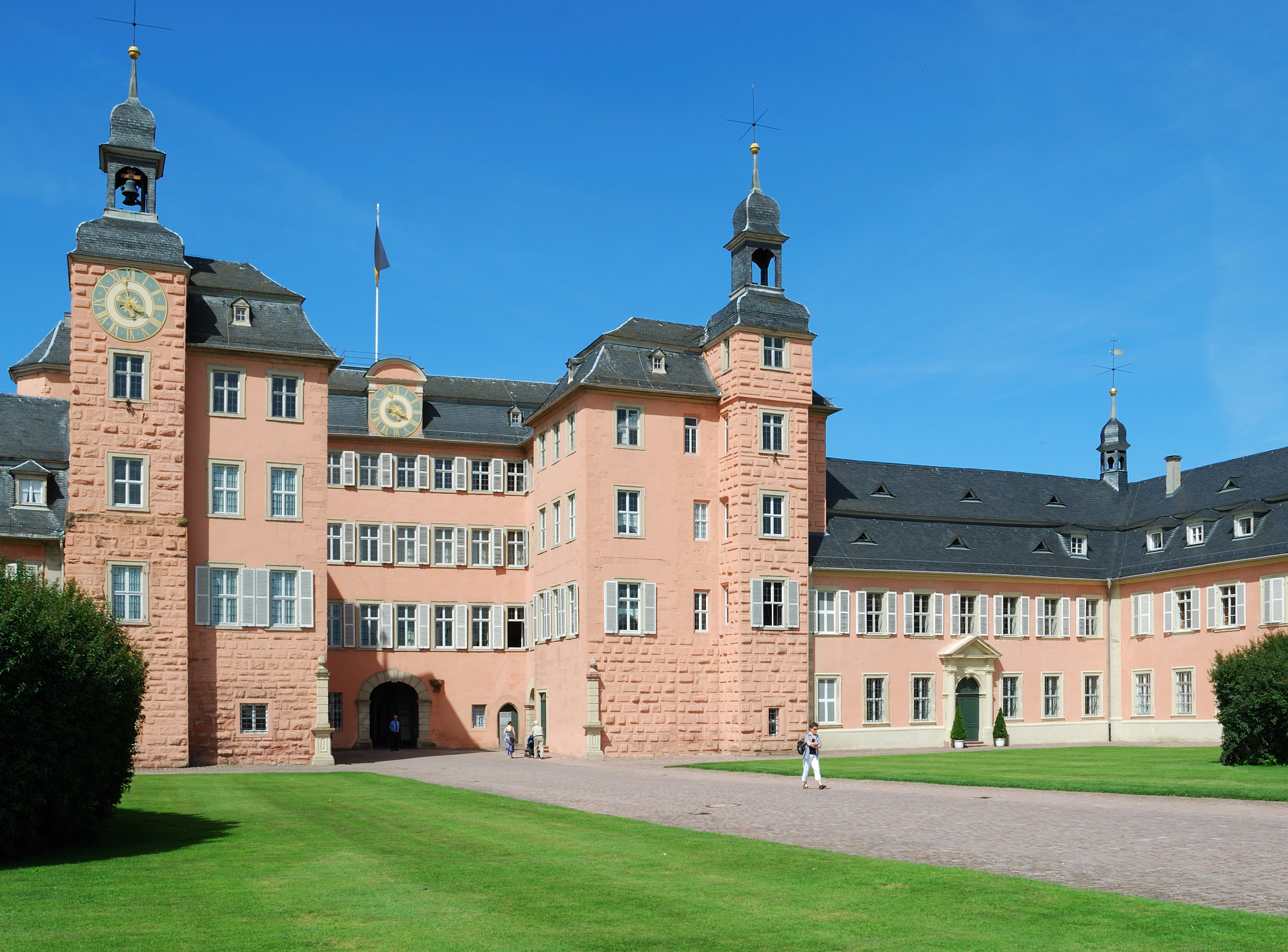
Entrance to Schwetzingen Castle

Charles Theodore liked to style himself as a prince of peace, in contrast to other princes like his chief political opponent, the great warrior Frederick the Great of Prussia. Allegorically, Minerva, the Roman goddess of wisdom and protectress of the arts, is often depicted as a stand-in for the elector himself. This self-view is best summed up in the inscription of a small monument at Schwetzingen:

"A field of war and death of Romans and Germans has been discovered, through the unearthing of weapons, urns and bones, in the year 1765. – To the arts of peace, which are the sole joys of his life, the elector Charles Theodore has dedicated this spot, excavated to the height of seven feet, and had this monument erected in 1768."

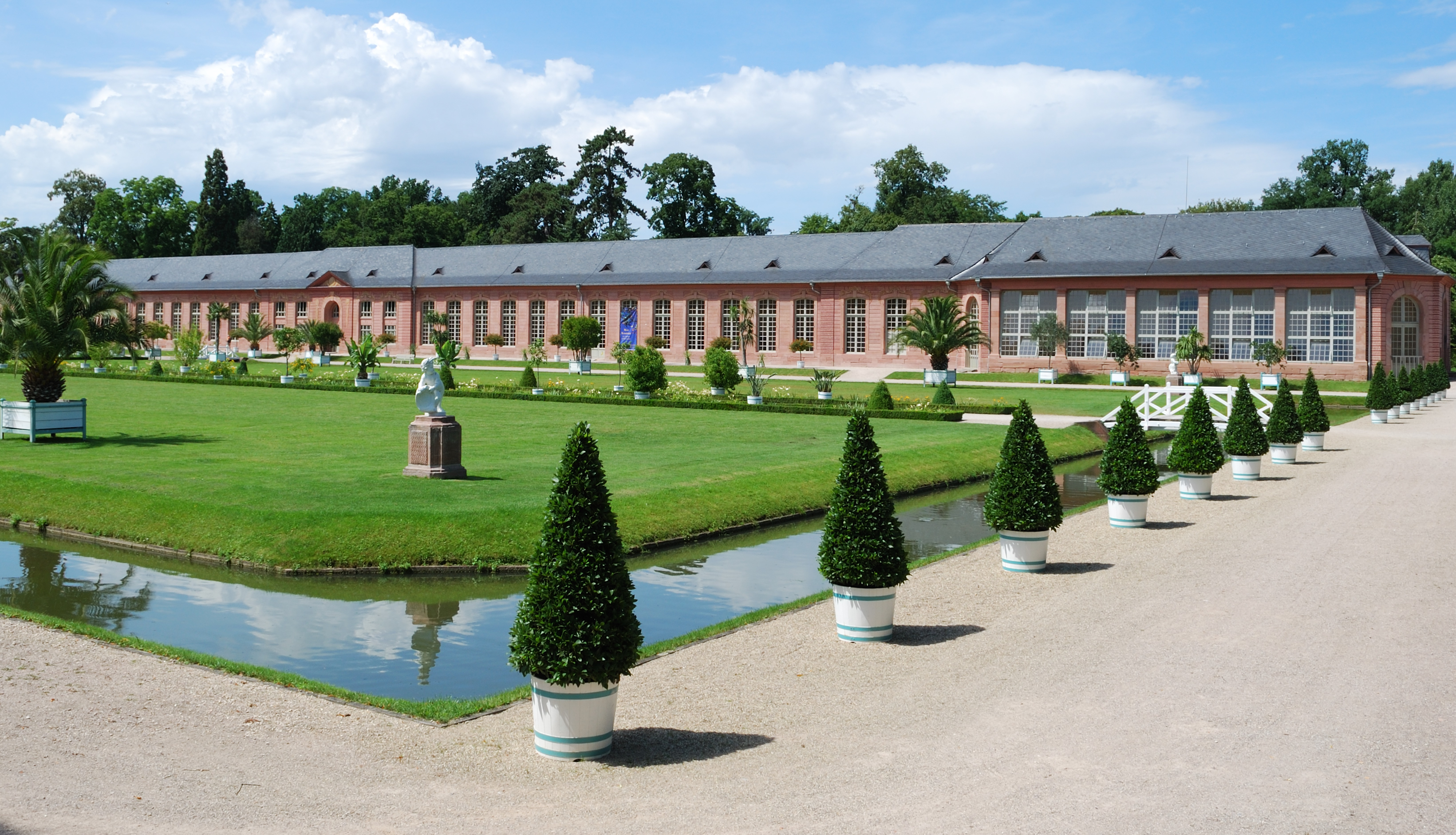
Orangerie at Schwetzingen Castle

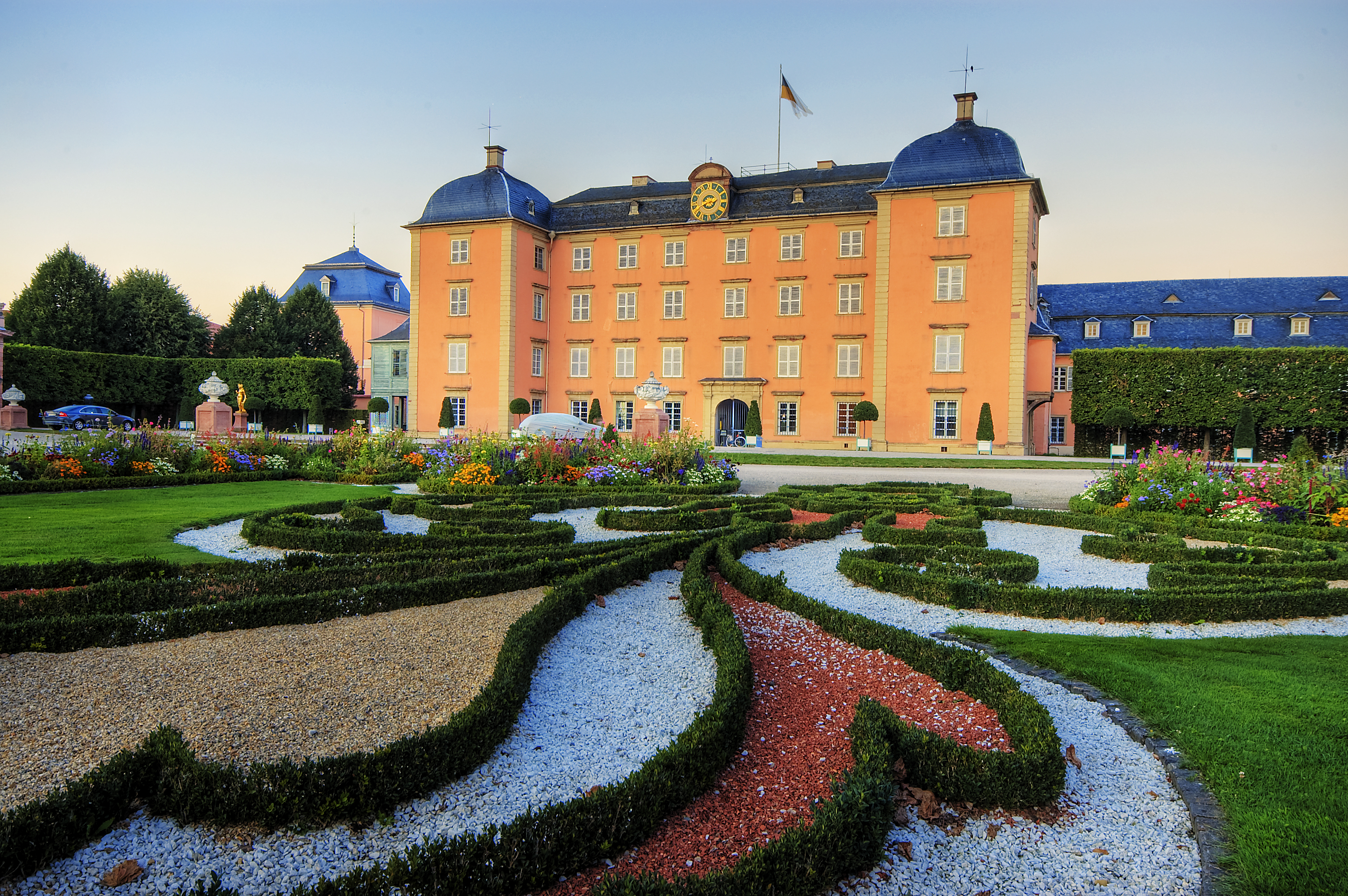
Garden at Schwetzingen Castle

== Family ==
=== Marriages and children ===
On 17 January 1742, in Mannheim, he married Elisabeth Auguste, daughter of Count Palatine Joseph Charles of Sulzbach and his consort Countess Palatine Elizabeth Augusta Sophie of Neuburg. There was one child of this marriage who died in infancy, Francis Louis Joseph (28 – 29 June 1761).

On 15 February 1795, in Innsbruck, he married Archduchess Maria Leopoldine of Austria-Este. There were no children of this marriage.

=== Illegitimate children ===
From his liaison with the actress Françoise Després-Verneuil, later Countess von Parkstein (d. 1765):

1. Karoline Franziska Dorothea, Countess von Parkstein (1762 – 7 September 1816, Ickelheim); married Prince Friedrich Wilhelm zu Isenburg-Büdingen-Birstein (13 December 1730, Birstein – 12 October 1804, Mannheim)
2. son (1764–1765)

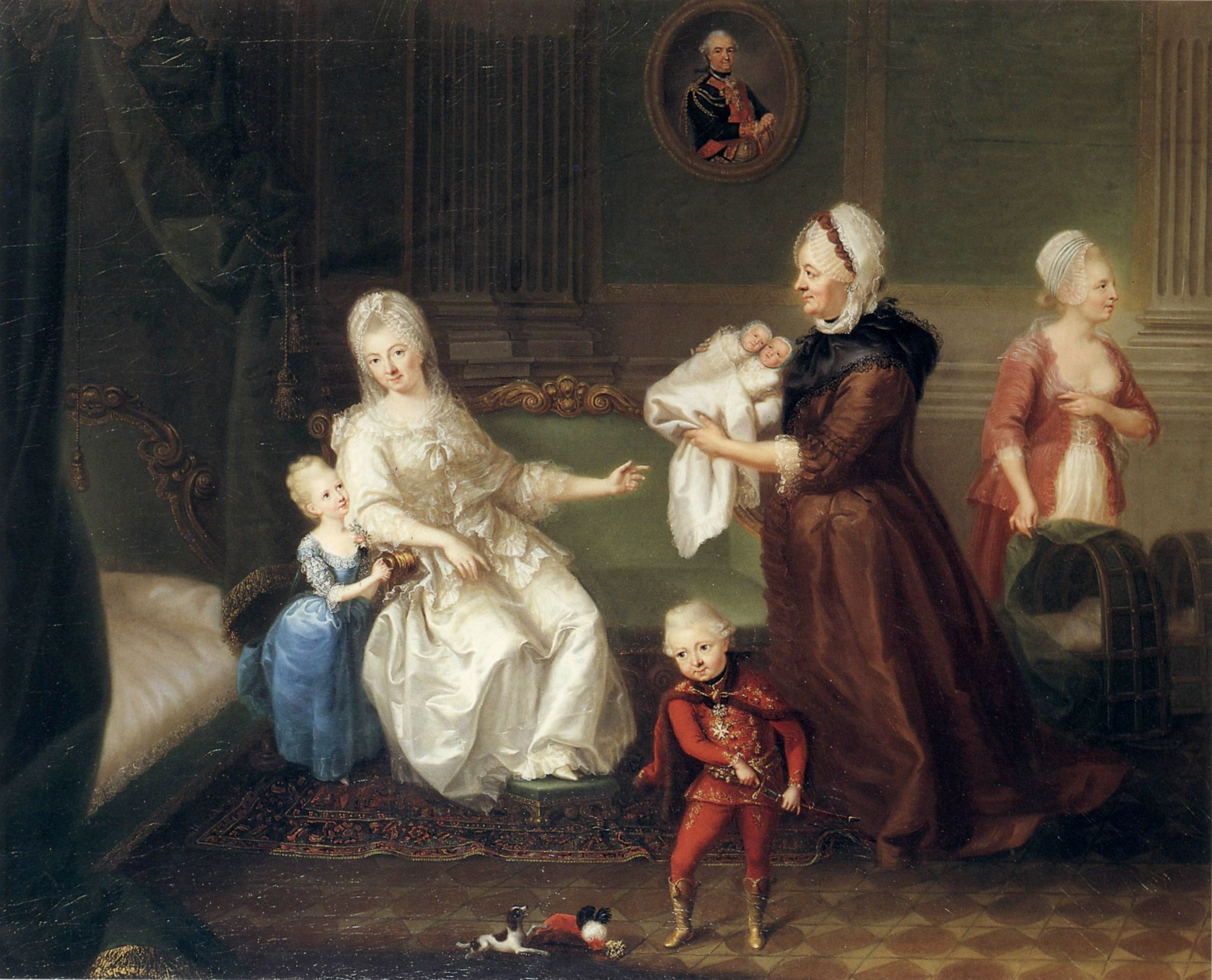
Charles Theodore's legitimated children and his second mistress

From his liaison with Maria Josefa Seyfert, Countess von Heydeck (1748 – 1771):

1. Karoline Josepha von Bretzenheim (27 January 1768 – 27 April 1786); married Count Maximilian Josef von Holnstein (20 May 1760 – 1838) in 1784
2. Karl August, Count of Heydeck, later Reichsfürst von Bretzenheim, (24 December 1769 – 27 February 1823) married Princess Maria Walburga von Oettingen-Spielberg (29 August 1766 – 8 May 1833) on 27 April 1788, Oettingen
3. Eleonore Karoline von Bretzenheim (9 December 1771 – 23 December 1832); married Count Wilhelm Karl von Leiningen-Billigheim (5 July 1737 – 26 January 1809) on 21 November 1787 (divorced 1801)
4. Friederike Karoline von Bretzenheim (9 December 1771 – 2 March 1816), twin with Eleonore; married Count Maximilian von Westerholt-Gysenberg (1772 – 19 April 1854) in 1796

From his liaison with Countess Maria Anna zu Leiningen-Westerburg-Neuleiningen (1741–1835), widow of Count Franz Friedrich von Sayn-Wittgenstein-Vallendar (1702–1769):

1. Karoline von Ezenried (31 August 1771 Münstereifel – 24 September 1828, Schloss Laim bei München, married with Dr. Joseph Reubel, Professor of Medicine, Ludwig-Maximilians-Universität München)

== See also ==
- History of Bavaria

Charles Theodore, Elector of Bavaria House of Wittelsbach Born: 12 December 1724 Died: 16 February 1799
German nobility
Preceded by John Christian	Count Palatine of Sulzbach; 1733–99	Succeeded by Maximilian IV Joseph
Preceded by Charles III Philip	Elector Palatine; 1742–99	Succeeded by Maximilian IV Joseph
Preceded by Charles III Philip	Duke of Jülich and Berg; 1742–99	Succeeded by Maximilian IV Joseph
Preceded by Charles III Philip	Count Palatine of Neuburg; 1742–99	Succeeded by Maximilian IV Joseph
Preceded by Maximilian III Joseph	Elector of Bavaria; 1777–99	Succeeded by Maximilian IV Joseph
Preceded by Marie Henriette	Marquis of Bergen op Zoom; 1742–95	Batavian Republic
