= Palatinate-Sulzbach =

Name of two separate states of the Holy Roman Empire

Palatinate-Sulzbach Pfalz-Sulzbach
- 1569–1604; 1614–1742
- Coat of arms

- Status: State of the Holy Roman Empire
- Capital: Sulzbach
- Government: Principality
- History
  - Partitioned from Palatinate-Zweibrücken: 1569
  - Annexed to Palatinate-Neuburg: 1604
  - Partitioned from Palatinate-Neuburg: 1614
  - Annexed to the Electorate of the Palatinate: 1742
Preceded by	Succeeded by
Palatine Zweibrücken	Electoral Palatinate

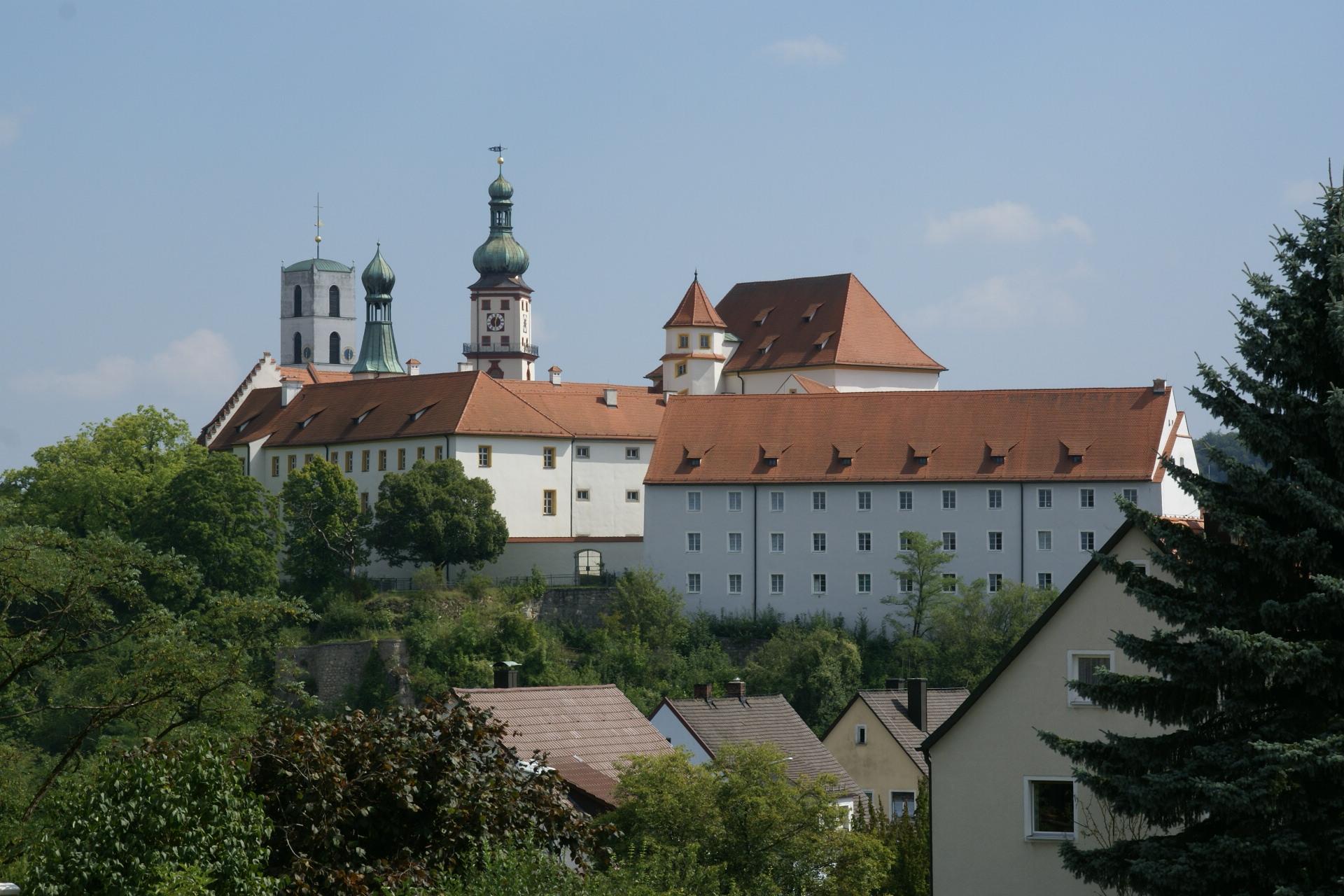
Sulzbach Castle

Palatinate-Sulzbach was the name of two separate states of the Holy Roman Empire located in modern Amberg-Sulzbach, Bavaria, Germany, ruled by a branch of the House of Wittelsbach.

== Palatinate-Sulzbach (1569–1604) ==
Palatinate-Sulzbach was partitioned from Palatinate-Zweibrücken upon the death of Wolfgang, Count Palatine of Zweibrücken in 1569. His will provided that Palatinate-Sulzbach should be created out of Palatinate-Zweibrücken and ruled by his younger son Otto Henry. Otto Henry died in 1604 without any heirs so Palatinate-Sulzbach passed to Palatinate-Neuburg.

== Palatinate-Sulzbach (1614–1742) ==
In 1614, Palatinate-Sulzbach was partitioned from Palatinate-Neuburg following the death of Count Palatine Philip Louis for his son Augustus.

It consisted of two noncontiguous areas separated by the Electorate of Bavaria. It was bordered on the west by the territory of the Imperial city of Nuremberg and on the east by the Kingdom of Bohemia.

Augustus' successor Christian Augustus was a tolerant ruler who allowed his subjects to choose their religious denomination, introduced the simultaneum, allowed Jews to live in Sulzbach in 1666, and established an important printing industry.

It became clear during the reigns of his successors that Palatinate-Sulzbach would inherit the Electorate of the Palatinate following the death of Charles III Philip, but this would only occur in 1742 for Charles Theodore.

== Rulers ==
Name	Reign	Notes
Otto Henry	1569–1604	
to Neuburg
Augustus	1614–1632	
Christian Augustus	1632–1708	
Theodore Eustace	1708–1732	
John Christian Joseph	1732–1733	
Charles Theodore	1733–1742	Elector Palatine; Duke of Bavaria
