= Princess Eleonore of Hesse-Rotenburg =

Eleonore
- Countess Palatine of Sulzbach
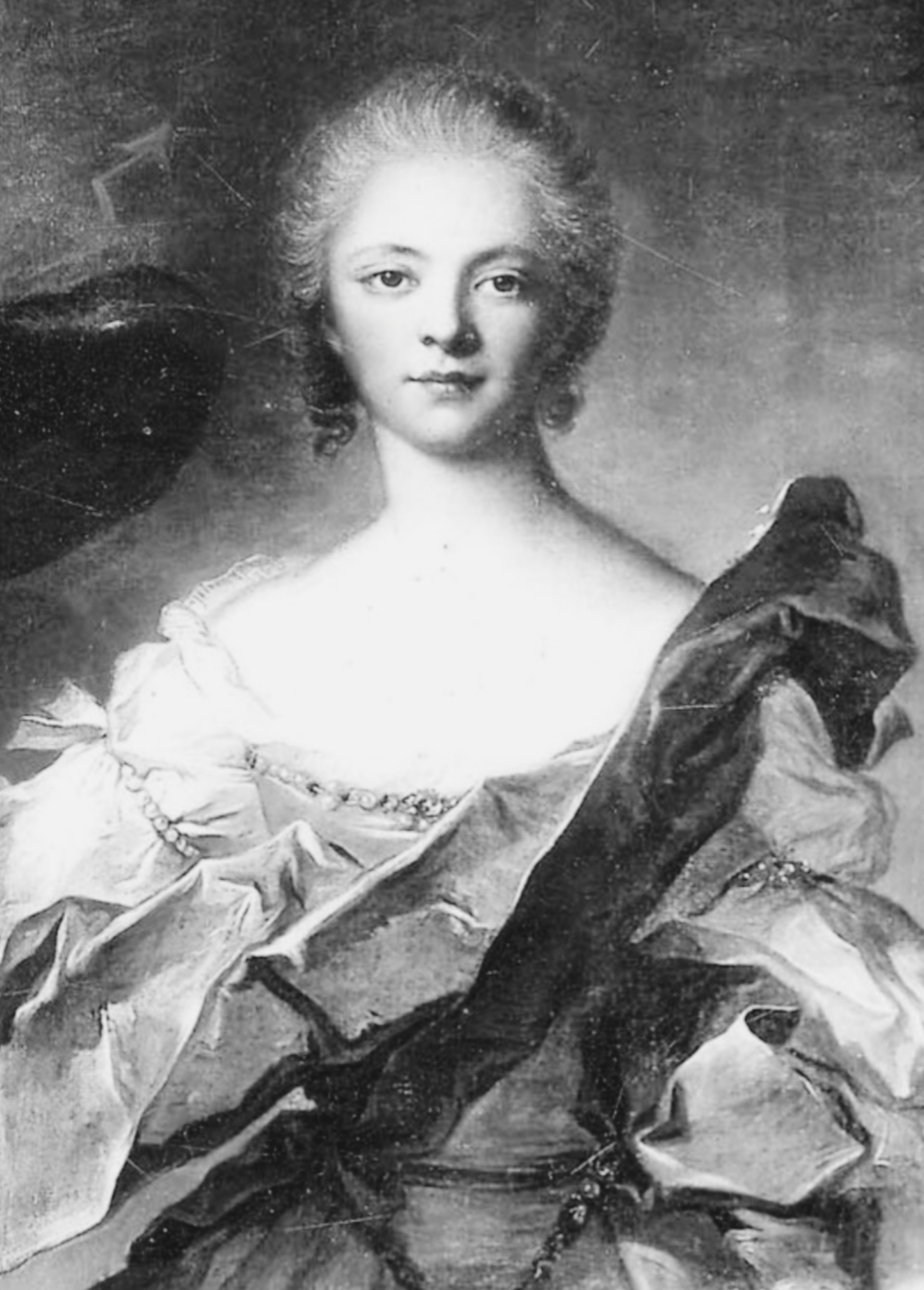
- Born: 17 October 1712; Schloss Rotenburg
- Died: 23 May 1759 (aged 46); Neuburg an der Donau
- Spouse: John Christian, Count Palatine of Sulzbach
- Father: Ernest Leopold, Landgrave of Hesse-Rotenburg
- Mother: Eleonore of Löwenstein-Wertheim-Rochefort

Princess Eleonore Philippina of Hesse-Rheinfels-Rotenburg (Eleonore Philippina Christina Sophia; 17 October 1712 – 23 May 1759) was the consort of John Christian, Count Palatine of Sulzbach, whose two children were both by his first wife, Maria Henriette de La Tour d'Auvergne.

== Biography ==
Born at the Landgrave’s Palace in Rotenburg an der Fulda she was the seventh child of Ernest Leopold, Landgrave of Hesse-Rotenburg by his wife, Countess Eleonore of Löwenstein-Wertheim-Rochefort. Her parents were first cousins, both being grandchildren of Ferdinand Karl, Count of Löwenstein-Wertheim-Rochefort. Her father, head of the only Roman Catholic branch of the House of Hesse, became ruler of Hesse-Rotenburg in 1725. She travelled to Turin where her sister Polyxena was the consort of Charles Emmanuel III of Sardinia.

Her husband had previously been married to Maria Henriette de La Tour d'Auvergne, who had died in 1728 after childbirth. He, too, was his wife's first cousin, Eleonore's father being a brother of John Christian's mother Maria Eleonore of Hesse-Rotenburg. She married John Christian in Mannheim on 21 January 1731. The next year, her husband succeeded as ruler of Sulzbach. The marriage remained childless and she became a widow in 1733. She traveled to Neuburg an der Donau where she died in 1759.

== Ancestry ==
Ancestors of Princess Eleonore of Hesse-Rotenburg

8. Ernest, Landgrave of Hesse-Rheinfels-Rotenburg
4. William, Landgrave of Hesse-Rotenburg
9. Marie Eleonore of Solms-Hohensolms
2. Ernest Leopold, Landgrave of Hesse-Rotenburg
10. Ferdinand Karl, Count of Löwenstein-Wertheim-Rochefort (=12)
5. Maria Anna of Löwenstein-Wertheim-Rochefort
11. Countess Anna Maria of Fürstenberg-Heiligenberg (=13)
1. Eleonore of Hesse-Rheinfels-Rotenburg
12. Ferdinand Karl, Count of Löwenstein-Wertheim-Rochefort (=10)
6. Maximilian Karl, Prince of Löwenstein-Wertheim-Rochefort
13. Countess Anna Maria of Fürstenberg-Heiligenberg (=11)
3. Eleonore of Löwenstein-Wertheim-Rochefort
14. Mathias Khuen von Belasi, Count zu Lichtenberg und Gandegg
7. Countess Polyxena Khuen von Belasi zu Lichtenberg
15. Countess Anna Susanna von Meggau zu Kreutzen

== Bibliography ==
- Huberty, Michel; Giraud, F. Alain; Magdelaine, F. & B (1976), L'Allemagne Dynastique (Tome I Hesse-Reuss-Saxe), Le Perreux: A. Giraud, ISBN 2-901138-01-2
