= Queen of Italy =

Solitaire card game

Queen of Italy (also known as Terrace) is a patience or card solitaire game played with two packs of playing cards. It is a very strategic game that rewards careful planning, since the cards that potentially block the game are presented at the start, and with care it can be completed about half the number of attempts.

== Rules ==
First, the player deals eleven overlapping cards in a row. These cards form the reserve or terrace. After leaving a space below the terrace for the foundations, the player lays four cards in a row. The player then chooses which of these four cards starts the first foundation. The player places the chosen card on the foundation row, immediately fills the gap it left with a new card from the stock. The player adds five new cards beside these four to form the tableau.

The player builds the foundations in alternating colours, wrapping from King to Ace if necessary. The cards on the tableau are available to build either on the foundations, or on other cards in the tableau. Cards on the tableau are built down on each other, also in alternating colours, and the player immediately fills any gap with a card from the stock. The player moves one card at a time, and when building cards form a column, only the top card is available for play. The top card (the exposed card) of the terrace is the only card available for play and the player can only use it to build on the foundations.

When there are no more possible moves on the tableau, the stock is dealt one card at a time and placed on the wastepile, the top card of which is available to be built on the foundations or the tableau. The top card of the wastepile is also used to fill a gap on the tableau whenever it occurs. However, when the stock runs out, there is no redeal; the game ends soon after.

The player wins the game when all cards end up in the foundations—and loses when blocked after dealing the entire stock.

== Variations ==
Since this is an old and classic game, several common variations exist, including Blondes and Brunettes, Redheads, and Falling Star, and General's Patience. In some cases the initial foundation card is decided by the deal rather than the player. In other cases empty spaces are filled automatically from the stock or by the waste pile, or can be filled by using cards from the tableau. Sometimes a single re-deal is allowed. General's Patience requires the foundations to be built up by suit rather than alternate colours.

== See also ==
- List of patiences and solitaires
- Glossary of patience and solitaire terms
