= Princess Caroline of Hesse-Rotenburg =

Princess of Condé (1714–1741)

Caroline of Hesse-Rotenburg
- Princess of Condé
- Born: 18 August 1714; Schloss Rotenburg
- Died: 14 June 1741 (aged 26); Hôtel de Condé, Paris, France
- Burial: Carmel du faubourg Saint-Jacques, Paris
- Spouse: Louis Henri, Duke of Bourbon (m. 1728; died 1740)
- Issue: Louis Joseph, Prince of Condé
- Father: Ernest Leopold, Landgrave of Hesse-Rotenburg
- Mother: Eleonore of Löwenstein-Wertheim

Princess Caroline of Hesse-Rheinfels-Rotenburg (18 August 1714 – 14 June 1741) was Princess of Condé by marriage to Louis Henri, Duke of Bourbon.

== Early life ==
Born at Rotenburg an der Fulda in Hesse, Holy Roman Empire, she was the daughter of Ernest Leopold, Landgrave of Hesse-Rotenburg, head of the Roman Catholic branch of the House of Hesse, and his wife, Countess Eleonore of Löwenstein-Wertheim-Rochefort. She was one of ten children.

== Marriage ==
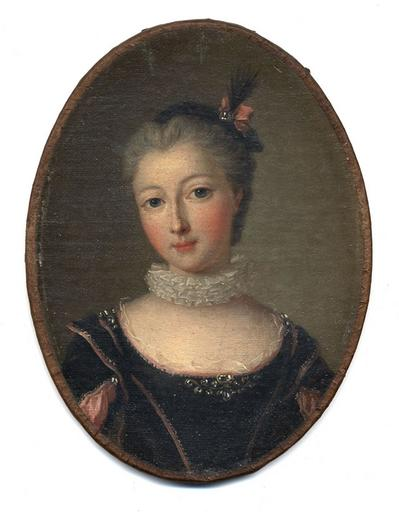
Portrait of a young Caroline by an unknown artist.

On 23 July 1728, she married Louis Henri, Duke of Bourbon, at Sarry in France. Louis Henri was a French prince of the Blood Royal and head of the House of Condé, a branch of the House of Bourbon. Maternally, he was a grandson of Louis XIV through his mother, one of the king's legitimated daughters. By the time of his second marriage to Caroline, Louis Henri had lost the sight of one eye and the attractive slenderness his height bestowed upon him in youth. After marriage she was known at the French court as Madame la Duchesse.

The previous Princess of Condé had been Marie Anne de Bourbon, who had died eight years before the marriage between Caroline and Louis Henri. Caroline was alleged to have been pretty and to have been included on a list of possible wives for Louis XV, but had been removed on account of her bad temper. When her husband was banished to his estates in 1725, Madame la Duchesse was obliged to withdraw with him to the Château de Chantilly until Monsieur le Duc was pardoned and the couple were allowed to resume attendance at the royal court again in 1730, where they lived quietly at the Hôtel de Condé. The couple had one child eight years into their marriage: Louis Joseph de Bourbon.

Her husband died at the Château de Chantilly on 27 January 1740, in the same year the future Marquis de Sade was born at the Hôtel de Condé; his mother was Caroline's lady in waiting. Caroline died in Paris one year later, in June 1741, and was buried at the Carmel du faubourg Saint-Jacques in Paris.

== Legacy ==
In 1767, one of her nieces, Princess Maria Luisa of Savoy, came to France to marry the young Louis Alexandre de Bourbon. She became the great friend of Marie Antoinette as the princesse de Lamballe and was murdered by a revolutionary mob in Paris during the September Massacres of 1792.

== Issue ==
- Louis Joseph de Bourbon (9 August 1736 – 13 May 1818); next Prince of Condé.

== Ancestry ==
Ancestors of Princess Caroline of Hesse-Rotenburg

8. Ernest I, Landgrave of Hesse-Rheinfels
4. William I, Landgrave of Hesse-Rotenburg
9. Maria Eleonore of Solms-Hohensolms
2. Ernest II Leopold, Landgrave of Hesse-Rotenburg
10. Ferdinand Karl, Count of Löwenstein-Wertheim-Rochefort
5. Maria Anna of Löwenstein-Wertheim-Rochefort
11. Anna Maria of Fürstenberg
1. Princess Caroline of Hesse-Rotenburg
12. Ferdinand Karl, Count of Löwenstein-Wertheim-Rochefort (= 10)
6. Maximilian Karl, Prince of Löwenstein-Wertheim-Rochefort
13. Anna Maria of Fürstenberg (= 11)
3. Eleonore of Löwenstein-Wertheim-Rochefort
14. Matthias, Count Khuen of Lichtenberg and Belasi
7. Maria Polyxena Khuen of Lichtenberg and Belasi
15. Anna Susanna of Meggau
