= Augustus, Count Palatine of Sulzbach =

German count (1582–1632)

Augustus
- Count Palatine of Sulzbach
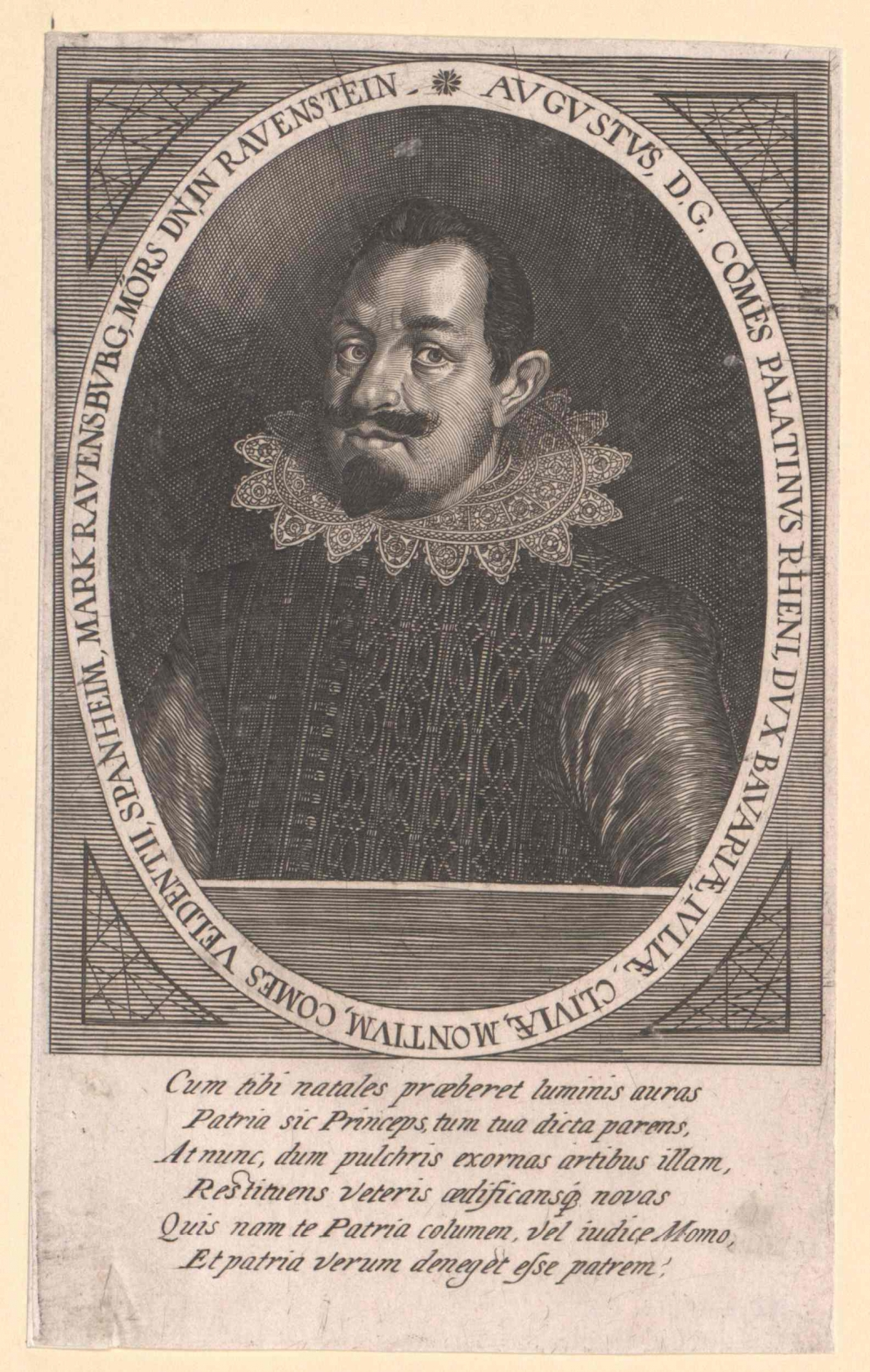
- Born: 2 October 1582; Neuburg
- Died: 14 August 1632 (aged 49); Windsheim
- Buried: Lauingen
- Noble family: House of Wittelsbach
- Spouse: Hedwig of Schleswig-Holstein-Gottorp
- Issue Detail: Christian Augustus; Philip Florinus
- Father: Philip Louis, Count Palatine of Neuburg
- Mother: Anna of Cleves

Augustus (German: August von Pfalz-Sulzbach; 2 October 1582 – 14 August 1632) was Count Palatine of Sulzbach from 1614 until 1632.

== Life ==
Augustus was born in Neuburg in 1582 as the second son of Philip Louis of Palatinate-Neuburg and Anna of Cleves. After his father's death in 1614 his territories were partitioned between Augustus and his two brothers - Augustus received northern portions of the Duchy of Neuburg which were constituted as the Duchy of Sulzbach.

Augustus died in Windsheim in 1632 and was buried in Lauingen.

He was a nephew of Countess Palatine Barbara of Zweibrücken-Neuburg.

== Marriage ==
Augustus married Hedwig of Schleswig-Holstein-Gottorp (23 December 1603 – 22 March 1657), daughter of Duke John Adolph and Princess Augusta of Denmark, on 17 July 1620 and had seven children:

1. Anne Sophie (17 July 1621 – 25 May 1675)
2. Christian Augustus (26 July 1622 – 23 April 1708)
3. Adolph Frederick (31 August 1623 – 14 March 1624)
4. Augusta Sophie (22 November 1624 – 30 April 1682), married Václav Eusebius František, Prince of Lobkowicz
5. John Louis (22 December 1625 – 30 October 1649)
6. Philip Florinus (20 January 1630 – 4 April 1703)
7. Dorothea Susanne (17 August 1631 – 3 July 1632)

Regnal titles
Preceded by Philip Louis	Count Palatine of Sulzbach; 1614 – 1632	Succeeded by Christian Augustus
