= Christian Augustus, Count Palatine of Sulzbach =

Count Palatine of Sulzbach from 1632 until 1708

Christian Augustus
- Count Palatine of Sulzbach
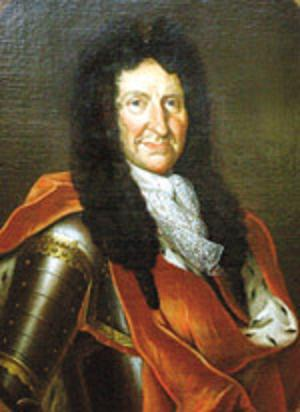
- Christian Augustus, Count Palatine of Sulzbach, portrait c. 1680
- Born: 26 July 1622; Sulzbach
- Died: 23 April 1708 (aged 85); Sulzbach
- Noble family: House of Wittelsbach
- Spouse: Amalie of Nassau-Siegen
- Issue Detail: Hedwig of the Palatinate-Sulzbach; Theodore Eustace
- Father: Augustus, Count Palatine of Sulzbach
- Mother: Hedwig of Schleswig-Holstein-Gottorp

Christian Augustus (German: Christian August) (26 July 1622 – 23 April 1708) was the Count Palatine of Sulzbach from 1632 until 1708.

== Life ==
Christian Augustus was born in Sulzbach in 1622 as the eldest son of Augustus, Count Palatine of Sulzbach and Hedwig of Holstein-Gottorp. He succeeded his father in August 1632, at the age of 10. Christian Augustus was a tolerant ruler. He granted his citizens the right to choose their Christian denomination and introduced the Simultaneum, whereby churches had both Protestant and Catholic services. In 1666 he permitted Jews to settle in the Duchy of Sulzbach and, due to his interest in mysticism and the Kabbalah, allowed a Hebrew print-shop. Under his rule, Sulzbach also became an intellectual center and the site of a regionally significant printing industry.

Christian had a close relationship with his granddaughter Sibylle of Saxe-Lauenburg, wife of Louis William of Baden-Baden and Regent of her son's dominions.

Christian Augustus died in Sulzbach in 1708 and was buried in the Church of Sancta Maria in Sulzbach.

== Marriage and issue ==
Christian Augustus married Amalie of Nassau-Siegen, daughter of Count John VII, on 27 March 1649 and had the following children:

1. Hedwig of the Palatinate-Sulzbach (15 April 1650 – 23 November 1681), married on 9 April 1668 Duke Julius Francis of Saxe-Lauenburg
2. Amalie (31 May 1651 – 11 December 1721) Nun in Cologne, St. Maria Monastery
3. John Augustus Hiel (11 December 1654 – 14 April 1658)
4. Christian (14 August 1656 – 9 November 1657)
5. Theodore Eustace married Landgravine Maria Eleonore of Hesse-Rotenburg

== Sources ==
- Heller, Marvin J. (2019). Printing the Talmud: Complete Editions, Tractates, and Other Works and the Associated Presses from the Mid-17th Century through the 18th Century. Brill.
- Klueting, Harm (2004). Das Reich und seine Territorialstaaten im 17. und 18. Jahrhundert: Aspekte des Mit-, Neben-und Gegeneinander (in German). LIT Verlag.

Christian Augustus, Count Palatine of Sulzbach House of Wittelsbach Born: 26 July 1622 Died: 23 April 1708
German royalty
| Preceded by Augustus | Count Palatine of Sulzbach; 1632 – 1708 | Succeeded by Theodore Eustace |
