= Charles, Prince of Soubise =

French Royal Army officer and courtier (1715–1787)

Marshal of France Charles de Rohan
- Duke of Rohan-Rohan; Prince of Soubise
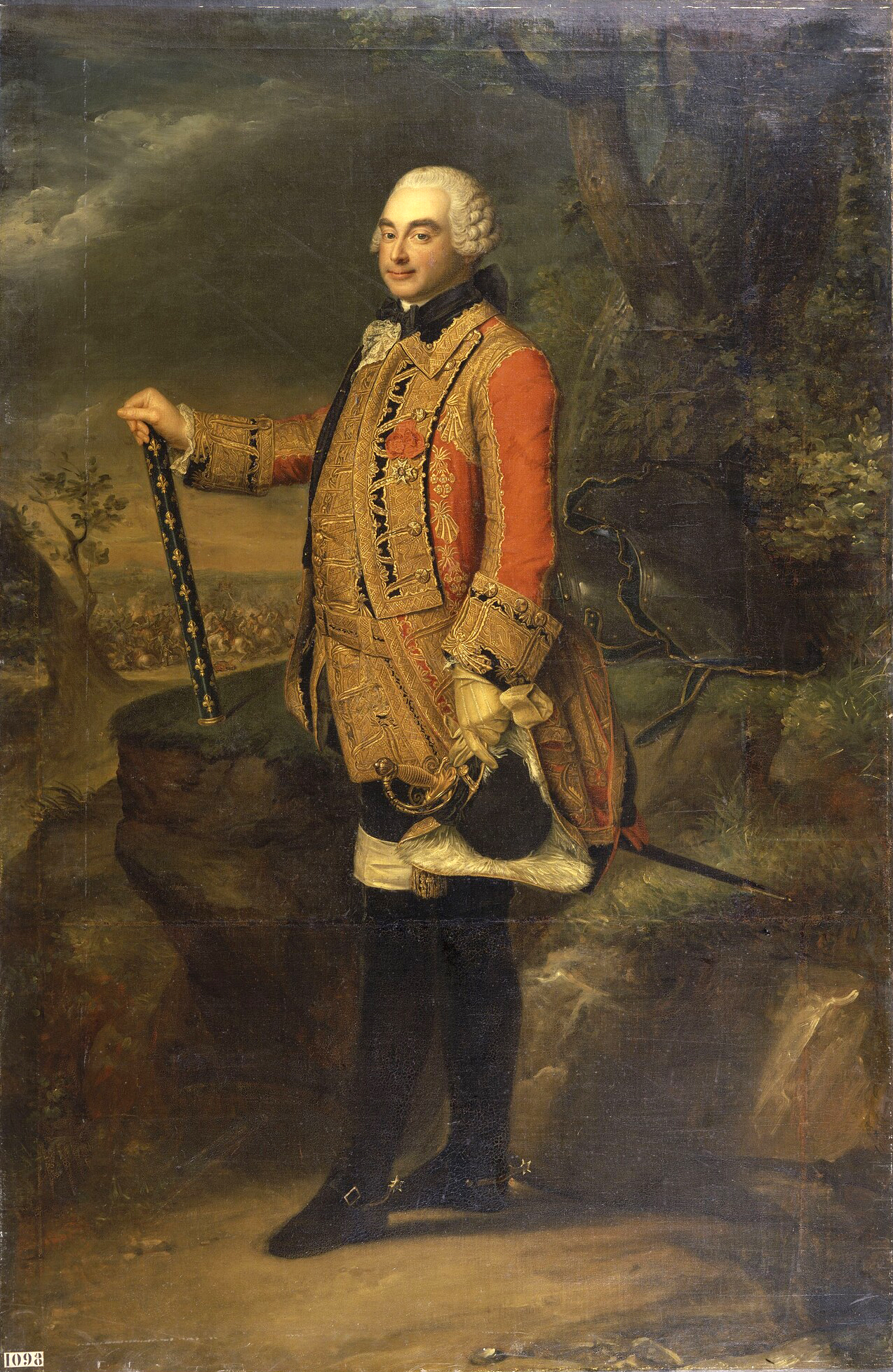

Governor of Flanders and Hainaut
- Tenure: 26 September 1751 – 1 July 1787
- Predecessor: Charles Joseph Marie de Boufflers
- Successor: Charles Eugène Gabriel de La Croix
- Other titles: Duke of Rohan-Rohan, Duke of Ventadour, 4th Prince of Soubise, Prince of Épinoy, Marquis of Roubaix, Count of Saint-Pol, Seigneur of Roberval
- Born: 16 July 1715; Palace of Versailles, Kingdom of France
- Died: 1 July 1787 (aged 71); Hôtel de Soubise, Paris, Kingdom of France
- Noble family: Rohan
- Spouses: Anne Marie Louise de La Tour d'Auvergne (m. 1734; died 1739) Princess Anne Thérèse of Savoy (m. 1741; died 1745) Landgravine Victoria of Hesse-Rotenburg (m. 1745)
- Issue Detail: Charlotte, Princess of Condé; Victoire, Princess of Guéménée
- Father: Jules, Prince of Soubise
- Mother: Anne Julie de Melun
- Military career
- Allegiance: France
- Branch: French Royal Army
- Service years: 1732–1762
- Rank: Marshal of France
- Conflicts: Seven Years' War

Charles de Rohan, Prince of Soubise (16 July 1715 – 1 July 1787) was a French Royal Army officer and courtier who served during the reigns of Louis XV and Louis XVI. He was the last male of his branch of the House of Rohan, and was great-grandfather to the Duke of Enghien, executed by Napoleon in 1804. Styled Prince d'Epinoy at birth, he became the Prince of Soubise after 1749.

== Biography ==
Rohan was born at the Palace of Versailles on 16 July 1715, the son of Jules, Prince of Soubise, lieutenant captain of the Gendarmes of the Royal Guard, and of Anne Julie Adélaïde de Melun. The eldest of five children, he was styled the Prince of Epinoy till his father's death in 1724.

His parents died in Paris of smallpox in 1724, leaving him and his remaining siblings, including Marie Louise, orphans. His sister lost her husband to smallpox in 1743.

He was entrusted to his grandfather Hercule Mériadec, Duke of Rohan-Rohan, who raised Soubise to the court, where he became the companion of Louis XV, who was the same age as he. One of his great grandmothers was Madame de Ventadour, via his paternal grandmother Anne Geneviève de Lévis; Madame de Ventadour, who died in 1744, was close to her great grandson.

He accompanied Louis XV in the campaign of 1744–48 and attained high military rank, which owed more to his courtiership than to his generalship.

Soon after the beginning of the Seven Years' War, through the influence of Madame de Pompadour, he was put in command of a corps of 24,000 men, and in November 1757 his army was defeated by Prussian forces at the Battle of Rossbach. Along with France's failure to hold Hanover following the French invasion of Hanover this marked a dramatic turnaround for French fortunes as just months before they had seemed on the brink of victory in Europe.

He was more fortunate, however, in his later military career, and continued in the service until the 1763 Treaty of Paris, after which he lived the life of an ordinary courtier and man of fashion in Paris.

== Marriages and issue ==
Charles married three times. His first marriage was in 1734 to Anne Marie Louise de La Tour d'Auvergne (1722–1739), daughter of Emmanuel Théodose de La Tour d'Auvergne and a granddaughter of the famous Marie Anne Mancini; Anne Marie Louise died in 1739 giving birth to a son, who died in 1742. They had one surviving child:

- Charlotte Élisabeth Godefride de Rohan 1737–1760 known as Charlotte. She married Louis Joseph de Bourbon, a Prince du sang and descendant of Louis XIV and Madame de Montespan. Charlotte was the paternal grandmother of the murdered Louis Antoine, Duke of Enghien.

In 1741, he married Princess Anna Teresa of Savoy (1717–1745), a daughter of Victor Amadeus I, Prince of Carignano, and Maria Vittoria Francesca of Savoy (who in turn was an illegitimate daughter of Victor Amadeus II of Sardinia). Anna Teresa (known as Anne Thérèse de Savoie) gave birth to another daughter:

- Victoire Armande Josèphe de Rohan (1743–1807); married Henri Louis Marie de Rohan, Prince of Guéménée, who was a cousin. Victoire was later the governess to the daughter of Marie Antoinette.

After Anne Thérèse died in 1745, Charles married that same year Princess Anna Viktoria of Hessen-Rheinfels-Rotenburg (1728–1792). They had no children.

Charles also notably had relationships with Madeleine Guimard and Anne Victoire Dervieux.

== Legacy ==
Soubise sauce, based on onion and béchamel, is said to have been named after him.

== Ancestry ==
Ancestors of Charles, Prince of Soubise

8. François de Rohan, Prince of Soubise
4. Hercule Mériadec de Rohan, Duke of Rohan-Rohan
9. Anne de Rohan-Chabot, Princess of Soubise
2. Jules de Rohan, Prince of Soubise
10. Louis Charles de Lévis, Duke of Ventadour
5. Anne Geneviève de Lévis
11. Charlotte de La Motte Houdancourt
1. Charles de Rohan, Prince of Soubise
12. Alexandre Guillaume de Melun, Prince of Epinoy
6. Louis de Melun, Prince of Epinoy
13. Jeanne Pelagie de Rohan-Chabot
3. Anne Julie de Melun
14. François Marie de Lorraine, Prince of Lillebonne
7. Élisabeth Thérèse de Lorraine
15. Anne de Lorraine
