= Ernst II Leopold, Landgrave of Hesse-Rotenburg =

Ernst Leopold
- Landgrave of Hesse-Rotenburg
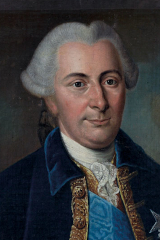
- Born: 15 June 1684; Langenschwalbach
- Died: 29 November 1749 (aged 65); Schloss Rotenburg, Rotenburg
- Spouse: Eleonore of Löwenstein-Wertheim
- Issue Detail: Joseph, Hereditary Prince of Hesse-Rotenburg; Polyxena, Queen of Sardinia; Caroline, Princess of Condé; Constantine, Landgrave of Hesse-Rotenburg; Christine, Princess of Carignan; Eleonora, Countess Palatine of Sulzbach
- House: Hesse-Rotenburg
- Father: William of Hesse-Rotenburg
- Mother: Maria Anna of Löwenstein-Wertheim

Ernst II Leopold (15 June 1684 – 29 November 1749) was Landgrave of Hesse-Rotenburg from 1725 until his death.

== Early life ==
Born in Langenschwalbach, into the collateral branch of the House of Hesse, he was a son of Landgrave William, Landgrave of Hesse-Rotenburg and his wife, Countess Maria Anna of Löwenstein-Wertheim-Rochefort (1652–1688).

== Marriage and issue ==
He married his first cousin, Countess Eleonore of Löwenstein-Wertheim-Rochefort (1686–1753), in Frankfurt, on 9 November 1704. She was daughter of Maximilian Karl Albert, Prince of Löwenstein-Wertheim-Rochefort and his wife, Countess Maria Polyxena Khuen of Belasi and Lichtenberg (1658–1712). They had ten children:

1. Joseph, Hereditary Prince of Hesse-Rotenburg (1705–1744); married Princess Christina of Salm had issue.
2. Polyxena of Hesse-Rotenburg, Queen of Sardinia (1706–1735); married Charles Emmanuel III of Sardinia had issue.
3. Landgravine Magdalene Leopoldina of Hesse-Rotenburg (1707–1708); died in infancy.
4. Wilhelm of Hesse-Rotenburg (1708); died in infancy.
5. Sophie of Hesse-Rotenburg (1709–1711); died in infancy.
6. Franciscus Alexander of Hesse-Rotenburg (1710–1739); died unmarried.
7. Eleonore Philippina of Hesse-Rotenburg (1712–1759); married John Christian, Count Palatine of Sulzbach, no issue.
8. Landgravine Caroline of Hesse-Rotenburg (1714–1741); married Louis Henri, Duke of Bourbon, and had issue.
9. Constantine, Landgrave of Hesse-Rotenburg (1716–1778); his successor.
10. Landgravine Christine of Hesse-Rotenburg (1717–1778); married Louis Victor, Prince of Carignan, and had issue.

Through his eldest daughter, his present descendants include the claimant Duke of Parma; the pretending King of the Two Sicilies and the reigning Grand Duke of Luxembourg. His youngest daughter is also an ancestress of the above.

== Death ==
He died on 29 November 1749 in Rotenburg an der Fulda.

Preceded by William	Landgrave of Hesse-Rotenburg; 1725–1749	Succeeded by Constantine
