= Sulzbach-Rosenberg =

- Town
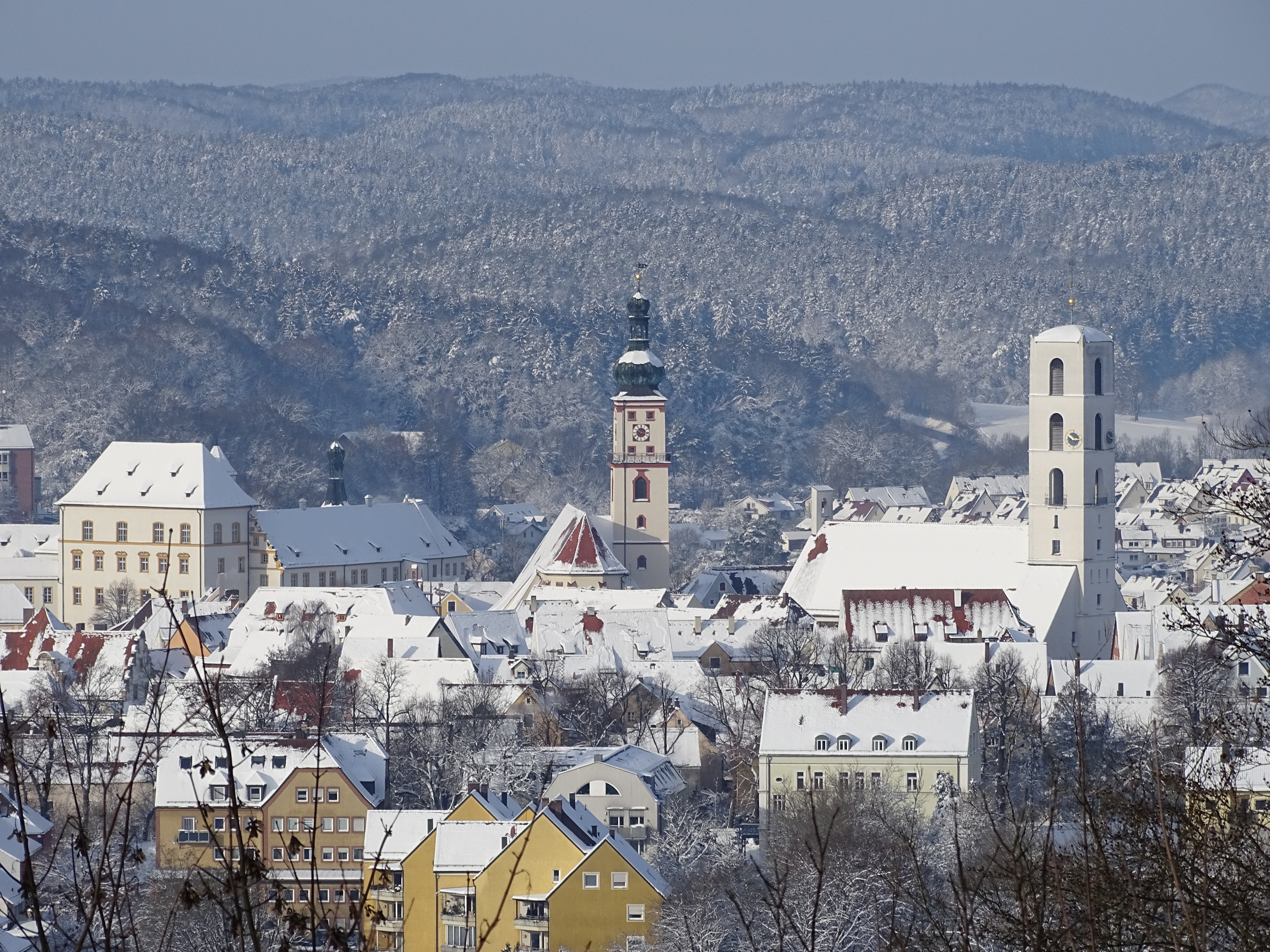
- Old Town of Sulzbach

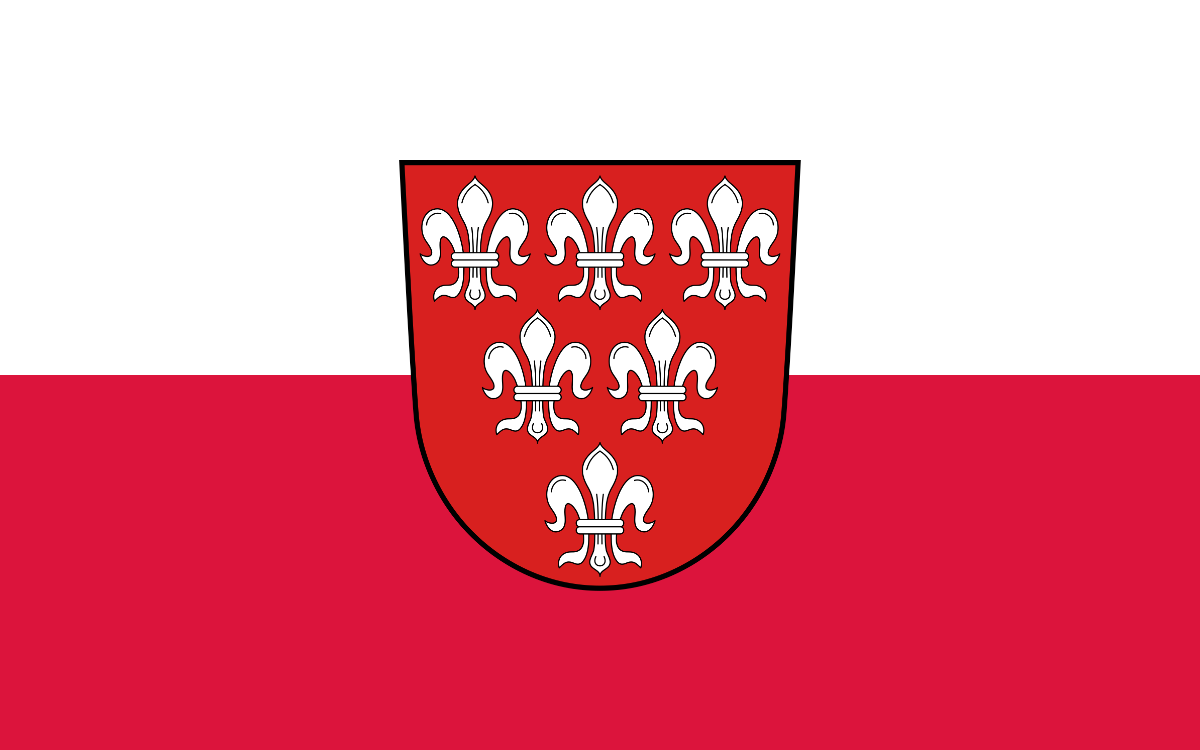
- Flag Coat of arms

- Location of Sulzbach-Rosenberg within Amberg-Sulzbach district
- Interactive map of Sulzbach-Rosenberg
- Location within Germany Location within Bavaria
- Coordinates: 49°30′N 11°45′E
- Country: Germany
- State: Bavaria
- Admin. region: Oberpfalz
- District: Amberg-Sulzbach

Government
  - Mayor (2024–30): Stefan Frank (CSU)

Area
  - Total: 53.12 km^{2} (20.51 sq mi)
- Elevation: 388–567 m (1,273–1,860 ft)

Population (2025-12-31)
  - Total: 19,255
  - Density: 362.5/km^{2} (938.8/sq mi)
- Time zone: UTC+01:00 (CET)
  - Summer (DST): UTC+02:00 (CEST)
- Postal codes: 92237
- Dialling codes: 09661
- Vehicle registration: AS, BUL, ESB, NAB, SUL
- Website: https://www.suro.city/

Sulzbach-Rosenberg (German pronunciation: [ˈzʊltsbax ˈʁoːzn̩bɛʁk]; Northern Bavarian: Suizboch-Rosnberg) is a town in the Amberg-Sulzbach district, in Bavaria, Germany. It is situated approximately 14 km northwest of Amberg, and 50 km east of Nuremberg. The town consists of two parts: Sulzbach in the west, and Rosenberg in the east.

Archeological evidence tells that Sulzbach was an important centre from the 8th century on. Sulzbach castle was founded during the early 8th century, probably by the late-Merovingian/early-Carolingian kingdom.

The castle was the residence of the powerful counts of the Nordgau (9th–10th century), the important counts of Sulzbach (c. 1003 – 1188) — one of whose daughters, Bertha of Sulzbach became the Empress of Byzantine Emperor Manuel I Comnenus — and later of the counts of Hirschberg (1188–1305), the counts of Wittelsbach (1305–1354, 1373–1504), emperor Karl IV (1354–1373), the palatine-dukes of Neuburg and of the dukes of Palatinate-Sulzbach (17th–18th century) of the House of Wittelsbach.

Since 2005, Sulzbach has hosted the Sulzbach-Rosenberg International Music Festival (known as the InterHarmony International Music Festival in other locations). It is one of several locations that hosts the InterHarmony international Music Festival, first conceptualized in 1997.

== Geography ==
Apart from the town Sulzbach-Rosenberg the municipality consists of the following villages:

- Etzmannshof
- Forsthof
- Gallmünz
- Großalbershof
- Großenfalz
- Grottenhof
- Grund
- Kauerhof
- Kempfenhof
- Kleinfalz
- Kropfersricht
- Kummerthal
- Lindhof
- Niederricht
- Obersdorf
- Prangershof
- Prohof
- Rummersricht
- See
- Seidersberg
- Siebeneichen
- Stephansricht
- Stifterslohe
- Sulzbach-Rosenberg
- Untermainshof
- Unterschwaig

== Notable people ==
- Walter Höllerer, novelist, poet and German professor, member of the Group 47
- Gertrude of Sulzbach (c. 1110–1146), Empress of Germany and second wife of Emperor Konrad III, Sister of Bertha von Sulzbach.
- Bertha of Sulzbach
- Christian Knorr von Rosenroth, Christian Hebraist and Christian Cabalist
- Charles Diebold, a German-American locksmith and founder of Diebold
