= William I, Landgrave of Hesse-Rotenburg =

William I
- Landgrave of Hesse-Rotenburg
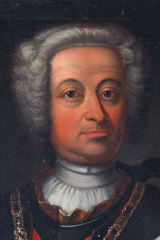
- Born: 15 May 1648; Kassel
- Died: 20 November 1725 (aged 77); Langenschwalbach
- Spouse: Maria Anna of Lowenstein-Wertheim-Rochefort
- Issue: Maria Eleonore, Countess Palatine of Sulzbach; Ernst II Leopold, Landgrave of Hesse-Rotenburg
- House: Hesse
- Father: Ernest, Landgrave of Hesse-Rheinfels
- Mother: Countess Maria Eleonore of Solms-Lich

William I (15 May 1648, Kassel – 20 November 1725, Langenschwalbach) was Landgrave of Hesse-Rotenburg from 1693 until his death.

== Early life ==
He was a son of Ernest I of Hesse-Rheinfels-Rotenburg (1623-1693) and his wife, Countess Maria Eleonore of Solms-Lich (1632-1689). William was nicknamed the Elder to distinguish him from his nephew, William of Hesse-Wanfried.

== Biography ==
After his father's death in 1693, William ruled one half of the Rotenburg Quarter, the quarter of Hesse-Kassel which Landgrave Maurice of Hesse-Kassel had distributed as fiefs among the sons of his second wife, Juliane. He officially resided in Rotenburg an der Fulda, but he often stayed in Langenschwalbach in the Taunus area. His descendants ruled the Rotenburg Quarter; his grandson, Constantine reunited all the parts of the Quarter.

William's dominions included the lower part of the County of Katzenelnbogen and the districts and castles of Burg Rheinfels, Reichenberg and Hohenstein as well as shares of Umstadt and Vierherren an der Lahn.

He swapped the district and city of Eschwege with his brother Charles, Landgrave of Hesse-Wanfried for the district and city of Rotenburg.

He also held the dominions of Falkenberg, Cornberg and Langenschwalbach and he received a share of the Hessian toll on the Rhine and custom duties on wine, agriculture and wool and the toll at Boppard.

William died in 1725, aged 67 and was buried in the Catholic Church of St. Elizabeth in Langenschwalbach.

== Marriage and issue ==
William married on 3 March 1669 in Rochefort Countess Maria Anna of Löwenstein-Wertheim-Rochefort (1652–1688), sister of Maximilian Karl, Prince of Löwenstein-Wertheim-Rochefort. Anna died in 1688 and was buried in the Franciscan monastery in Boppard. With her, he had eight children, including his successor, Ernest II Leopold.

1. Eleonore (born 26 November 1674)
2. Maria Eleonore (born 25 September 1675) married Eustace Theodore, Count Palatine of Sulzbach
3. Elisabeth Catherine Felicitas (14 February 1677-15 May 1739) married firstly Francis Alexander, Prince of Nassau-Hadamar; married secondly Count Anton Ferdinand of Attems
4. Sophie (born 4 April 1678)
5. Maria Amelie Wilhelmine (born 6 August 1679)
6. Johanna (born 12 September 1680), abbess
7. Ernestine (born 23 October 1681) married Roberto, Count of la Cerda de Villalonga
8. Ernest II Leopold (born 25 June 1684), Landgrave of Hesse-Rotenburg married Eleonore Maria Anna, Countess of Löwenstein-Wertheim-Rochefort

William I, Landgrave of Hesse-Rotenburg House of Hesse Born: 15 May 1648 Died: 20 November 1725
Preceded by Ernest I	Landgrave of Hesse-Rotenburg; 1693–1725	Succeeded by Ernest II Leopold
