= Christian, Landgrave of Hesse-Wanfried-Rheinfels =

- Born: 17 July 1689; Wanfried
- Died: 21 October 1755 (aged 66); Eschwege
- Buried: Hülfensberg
- Noble family: House of Hesse
- Spouse: Maria Franziska of Hohenlohe-Bartenstein
- Father: Charles, Landgrave of Hesse-Wanfried
- Mother: Alexandrine Juliane of Leiningen-Dagsburg

Christian of Hesse-Wanfried-Rheinfels (17 July 1689 in Wanfried – 21 October 1755 in Eschwege) was a son of Landgrave Charles of Hesse-Wanfried (1649–1711) and his second wife, Countess Alexandrine Juliane of Leiningen-Dagsburg (1651–1703). He was Landgrave of Hesse-Wanfried and Hesse-Rheinfels from 1731 until his death.

== Early life ==
As a younger son from his father's second marriage in a Catholic cadet line of the House of Hesse, Christian was originally meant to become a canon in Strasbourg. However, in 1710, at the age of 21, he opted for a career in the military. He served in the army of Hesse-Kassel, most recently as Brigadier.

== Inheritance dispute ==
After his father's death in 1711 he took up government in Hesse-Wanfried. His older half-brother, William II, however, appeared in Wanfried in the same year to put forward his own claim to this part of the inheritance. The dispute had to be settled by the Emperor. Christian had to give up the landgraviate. Instead, he received an annual pension of 7500 guilders. He also received Eschwege Castle in Eschwege in 1713, after Hesse-Kassel had repaid its debt to the Duke of Brunswick-Bevern. Christian renovated and expanded the neglected castle and added a Catholic chapel. He began calling himself Christian of Hesse-Eschwege. He continued using this name even after he inherited Hesse-Wanfried and Hesse-Rheinfels in 1731 from his childless half-brother William II.

== Reign ==
After the death of his childless half-brother William in 1731, Christian succeeded him as Landgrave in 1732 and moved into the residence at Wanfried. He concluded a treaty with his cousin, Landgrave Ernest Leopold of Hesse-Rotenburg to have both parts of the Rotenburg Quarter administered jointly by the chancellery in Rotenburg. He gradually moved his residence back to Eschwege, where he constructed his Princely Stables in 1735. Also in 1735, he sold Rheinfels Castle back to Hesse-Kassel.

He was described as "agreeable and well-educated" and was very popular in Eschwege, where he usually resided, and in Wanfried. Although he spent most of his later years in Eschwege, he still frequently visited Wanfried to support the local artisans. In both Eschwege and Wanfried, he commissioned numerous works of art for himself and his court.

== Death ==
Christian died of a stroke on 21 October 1755 on the steps of the church in Eschwege. He was buried in the family crypt in the Hülfensberg. His widow moved to Frankfurt, where she died on 11 December 1757.

With his death, the Hesse-Wanfried line died out after 88 years. His territory fell to Hesse-Rotenburg.

== Marriage ==
He was engaged to Maria Augusta, the daughter of Prince Anselm Francis of Thurn und Taxis. However, Emperor Charles VI requested a cancellation of the betrothal for political reasons, so that she could marry Duke Charles Alexander of Württemberg, the governor of Serbia, which she did in May 1727. Christian mourned his great love for a long time.

He was finally married at the age of 42 to his niece, Countess Maria Franziska of Hohenlohe-Bartenstein (1698–1757), the daughter of Count Philipp Karl of Hohenlohe-Bartenstein (1668–1729) and his sister, Landravine Sophia Leopoldine of Hesse-Wanfried (1681–1724). The marriage remained childless.

Christian, Landgrave of Hesse-Wanfried-Rheinfels House of Hesse Born: 17 July 1689 Died: 21 October 1755
Preceded by William II	Landgrave of Hesse-Wanfried-Rheinfels; 1731-1755	Succeeded by Constantine as Landgrave of Hesse-Rotenburg
