= Charles, Landgrave of Hesse-Wanfried =

German noble (1649–1711)

- Born: 19 July 1649; Rheinfels Castle, Germany
- Died: 3 March 1711 (aged 61); Bad Schwalbach, Germany
- Noble family: House of Hesse
- Spouses: Sophie Magdalene of Salm-Reifferscheid; Alexandrine Juliane of Leiningen-Dagsburg
- Father: Ernest, Landgrave of Hesse-Rheinfels
- Mother: Maria Eleonore of Solms-Lich

Charles of Hesse-Wanfried (19 July 1649 — 3 March 1711), was a Landgrave of Hesse-Wanfried. He was the second son of Landgrave Ernest of Hesse-Rheinfels and Maria Eleonore of Solms-Lich.

== Life ==
After an inheritance dispute about the "Rotenburg Quarter", Charles received Hesse-Eschwege in 1667. He moved to Wanfried and founded the Catholic line of Hesse-Wanfried. He used the castle in Wanfried as his residence, because the castle in Eschwege had been pledged to Brunswick-Bevern, also in 1667.

== Marriages ==
Charles's first wife was Countess Sophie Magdalene of Salm-Reifferscheidt (1649–1675), a daughter of Count Erich Adolph of Salm-Reifferscheid (1619–1673) and his wife Princess Magdalene of Hesse-Cassel (1611–1671). Sophie Magdalene died in 1675 during a trip to Venice. Charles then married Countess Alexandrine Juliane of Leiningen-Dagsburg (1651–1703), a daughter of Count Emich XIII of Leiningen and Countess Dorothea of Waldeck-Wildungen. Alexandrine Juliane was the widow of Landgrave George III of Hesse-Itter-Vöhl. She died on 19 April 1703 and was buried in the family vault in the Hülfensberg in Wanfried.

== Death and heir ==
Charles died in 1711 and was succeeded as Landgrave of Hesse-Wanfried by his son William II. After William's death in 1731, he was succeeded by his half-brother Christian, who died childless in 1755, thereby ending the Hessen-Wanfried line.

== Issue ==
From his marriage to Countess Sophie Magdalene of Salm-Reifferscheidt (1649-1675):

- Charles Ernest Adolph (born: 8 October 1669, died: December 1669)
- Anna Maria Eleonora (born: 13 October 1670; died: January 1671)
- William II "the Younger" (born: 25 August 1671 in Langenschwalbach; died: 1 April 1731 in Paris, and buried there), Landgrave of Hesse-Wanfried-Rheinfels
- Frederick (born: 17 May 1673; died: 25 October 1692), a canon at Cologne, died during a visit to the Bishop of Győr in Hungary
- Philip (born: June 1674; died: 28 August 1694)

From his marriage to Countess Alexandrine Juliane Leiningen-Dagsburg (1651-1703):

- Charlotte Amalie (born: March 8, 1679 at Wanfried, died: 8 February 1722 in Paris), married on 26 September 1694 in Cologne with Francis II Rákóczi (born: 27 March 1676; died: April 8, 1735), Prince of Transylvania
- Ernest (born: 20 April 1680 in Wanfried, died: June 24, 1680 ibid), buried in the Hülfensberg
- Sophia Leopoldine (born: 17 July 1681, died: 18 April 1724 in Wetzlar). Her daughter Maria Franziska of Hohenlohe-Bartenstein married Sophia's brother Christian.
- Charles Alexander (born: 6 November 1683 in Wanfried, died: February 1684 in Boppard)
- Maria Anna Johanna (born: 8 January 1685 in Wanfried, died: 11 June 1764 in Erfurt)
- Maria Therese Josepha Elisabeth (born: 5 April 1687, died: 9 September 1689)
- Christine Franziska Polyxene (born: 23 May 1688, died: 17 July 1728), married on 28 February 1712 with Dominic Marquard, Prince of Löwenstein-Wertheim-Rochefort
- Christian (born: 17 July 1689 in Wanfried, died: 21 October 1755 in Eschwege), the last Landgrave of Hesse-Wanfried-Eschwege and Hesse-Rheinfels
- Juliana Elizabeth Anna Louise (born: 20 October 1690 in Wanfried; died: 13 July 1724), married on 6 January 1718 in Wanfried with Count Christian Otto of Limburg-Stirum (born: 25 March 1694; died: 24 February 1749)
- Maria (born: 31 August 1693)
- Eleanor Bernhardine (born: 21 February 1695; died: 14 August 1768 in Frankfurt), married in June 1717 with Count Herman Frederick of Bentheim-Bentheim

Charles, Landgrave of Hesse-Wanfried House of Hesse Born: 19 July 1649 Died: 3 March 1711
Preceded by Ernest as Landgrave of Hesse-Rheinfels	Landgrave of Hesse-Wanfried; 1676-1711	Succeeded by William II as Landgrave of Hesse-Wanfried-Rheinfels
