= Countess Palatine Ernestine of Sulzbach =

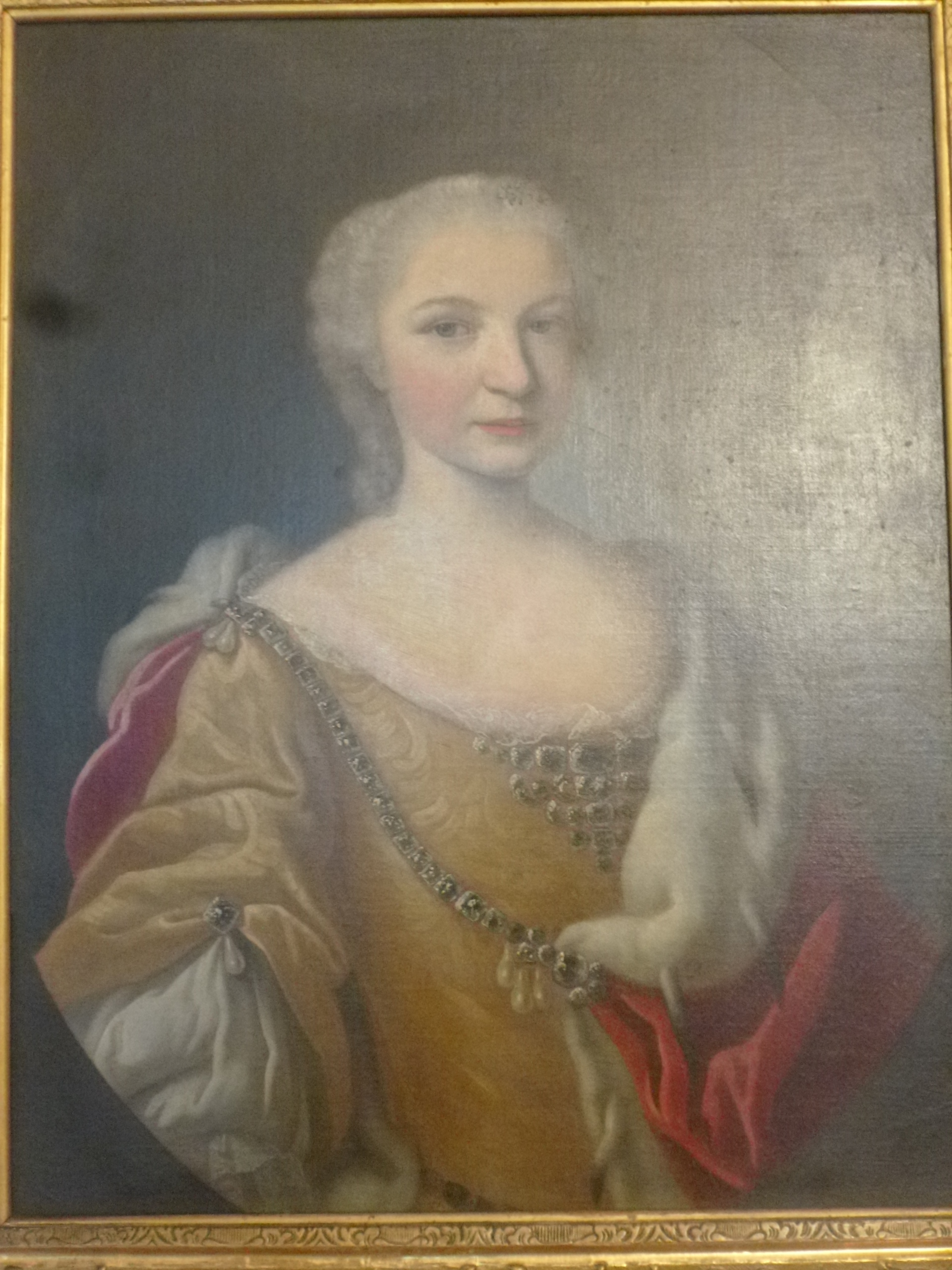
- Born: 15 May 1697; Sulzbach
- Died: 14 April 1775 (aged 77); Neuburg an der Donau, Kingdom of Bavaria
- Buried: Court Church, Neuburg an der Donau, Kingdom of Bavaria
- Noble family: House of Wittelsbach
- Spouse: William II, Landgrave of Hesse-Wanfried-Rheinfels (m. 1719; died 1731)
- Father: Theodore Eustace, Count Palatine of Sulzbach
- Mother: Landgravine Maria Eleonore of Hesse-Rotenburg

Countess Palatine Ernestine of Sulzbach (15 May 1697 – 14 April 1775) was the wife of Landgrave William "the Younger" of Hesse-Wanfried and after his death prioress of the Carmelite monastery in Neuburg an der Donau as Sister Teodora.

== Early life ==
She was the third daughter of the Duke Theodore Eustace of Sulzbach and his wife Landgravine Maria Eleonore of Hesse-Rotenburg. The Dukes and Counts Palatine of Sulzbach were a collateral line of the House of Wittelsbach.

== Life ==
Ernestine and her older sister Countess Palatine Francisca Christina of Sulzbach were brought up in Essen Abbey. Emperor Charles VI arranged her marriage with the 48-year-old William the Younger of Hesse-Wanfried-Rheinfels. The marriage took place on 19 September 1719 and remained childless. After her husband died in 1731, she initially lived at Rheinfels Castle, later she moved into the Carmelites monastery in Neuburg an der Donau, where she was known under the religious name Sister Teodora and eventually became prioress. According to Torsy and Kracht, she was a model for her sisters of obedience, humility and love of poverty. She had a reputation of sanctity when she died in 1775. She was buried in the Court Church in Neuburg.
