= William II of Hesse-Wanfried-Rheinfels =

Holy Roman Empire noble (1671–1731)

William II, Landgrave of Hesse-Wanfried-Rheinfels
- Born: 25 August 1671; Langenschwalbach
- Died: 1 April 1731 (aged 59); Paris
- Buried: Paris
- Noble family: House of Hesse
- Spouse: Countess Palatine Ernestine of Sulzbach
- Father: Charles, Landgrave of Hesse-Wanfried
- Mother: Sophie Magdalene of Salm-Reifferscheid

William II, Landgrave of Hesse-Wanfried-Rheinfels (also known as William the Younger; born: 25 August 1671 in Langenschwalbach; died: 1 April 1731 in Paris, and also buried there) was a son of the Landgrave Charles of Hesse-Wanfried (1649–1711) and his first wife, Countess Sophie Magdalene of Salm-Reifferscheid (d. 1675). He succeeded his father as Landgrave of Hesse-Wanfried and Hesse-Rheinfels. After 1711, he styled himself "Landgrave of Hesse-Rheinfels".

== Life ==
William the Younger began his career as canon in Cologne and Strasbourg. He was described as "stunted poor in mind and in bad environment". After his father's death in 1711 he travelled to Wanfried, where his younger half-brother Christian had assumed power. They had a dispute, which was sellted by emperor Charles VI. Christian gave up his claim on Hesse-Wanfried-Rheinfels, in exchange for an annual pension of 7500 guilders, plus Eschwege Castle. The castle had been pledged to Brunswick-Bevern in 1667. It was, however, redeemed for Christian in 1713.

William ruled Hesse-Wanfried-Rheinfels from 1711 to 1731. He travelled often, usually to the Imperial Court in Vienna. In 1718, the emperor put him in charge of Rheinfels Castle, where troops of Landgrave Charles of Hesse-Kassel had withstood and repulsed three heavy sieges by the French.

In 1719, William obtained permission from the Pope to revert to the lay state, to avert the impending extinction of the Hesse-Wanfried line. After mediation by the Emperor, he married on 19 September 1719 with Ernestine, the daughter of Count Palatine Theodore Eustace of Sulzbach. The marriage remained childless.

After William's death, Ernestine continued to live at Rheinfels Castle for a while, but then became prioress of the Carmelite monastery at Neuburg an der Donau, where she died on 5 April 1775.

Hesse-Wanfried and Hesse-Rheinfels were inherited by his younger half-brother, who had styled himself Christian of Eschwege since 1711.

William II of Hesse-Wanfried-Rheinfels House of Hesse Born: 25 August 1671 Died: 1 April 1731
Preceded by Charles as Landgrave of Hesse-Wanfried	Landgrave of Hesse-Wanfried-Rheinfels; 1711-1731	Succeeded by Christian
