= Johannes Letzner =

Johannes Letzner (29 November 1531 – 16 February 1613) was a Renaissance-era German Protestant priest and historian of Lower Saxony, in particular of Brunswick-Lüneburg.

Letzner studied briefly at Wittenberg University in 1550–1551 before moving to Uslar as cantor and school master, and later as vicar to Parensen (1553) Langenholtensen (1564), Lüthorst (1583), Iber (1589) and finally to Strodthagen where he retired in 1610 and died three years later.

Letzner's works were widely perused in 18th-century historiography of Germany, but they are now considered highly unreliable. His magnum opus was going to be a "Great Chronicle of Brunswick-Lüneburg" ("Große Braunschweig-Lüneburg-Göttingensche Chronika") in eight volumes, on which he worked during 36 years of his life. This work was never printed in full, but the fifteen works Letzner published in print during his lifetime can be seen as portions of this work.

Conradus Fontanus is one of the purported sources used by Letzner, allegedly a medieval chronicler who lived around 1200. Fontanus was included by Adelung in his continuation of Jöcher's Gelehrten-Lexicon, but in 20th century scholarship has come to be considered as of dubious historicity, or spurious. He is also the author of a Historia S. Bonifacii, a publication likewise criticized for fanciful inventions concerning local histories (he claims that at the Hülfensberg Saint Boniface destroyed the supposed Germanic god Stuffo), even for the invention of sources.

== Bibliography ==
- 1590, Corbeische Chronica (history of Corvey Abbey)
- 1594, Stammbuch oder Chronik Des Uralten Adelichen und Gedenkwürdigen Geschlechts Der „von Berlepsch“ ( history of the von Berlepsch noble family)
- 1596, Dasselische und Einbeckische Chronica (chronicle of Dassel and Einbeck)
- 1603, Historia Caroli Magni. Des Grossmechtigsten, Christlichen Roemischen und ersten Teutschen Keysers … Taten. (history of Charlemagne), printed by Andream Hantzsch at Hildeßheim.
- 1604, Ioannis Letzneri Chronica: und historische Beschreibung des Lebens, der Haendel und Thaten des teutsch. Röm. Keysers Ludovici Pii, und wie derselbe ... Corbei ... gestifftet samt angehengter Beschreibung der dreissig adelichen Geschlechter
- Chronica und historische Beschreibung des löblichen und weltberümbten keyserlichen freien Stiffts und Closters Walckenrieth (history of Walkenried Abbey)
- Hardessische Chronica (chronicle of Hardegsen)
