= Hesse-Wanfried =

Mini-state within the Holy Roman Empire (1700 - 1731)

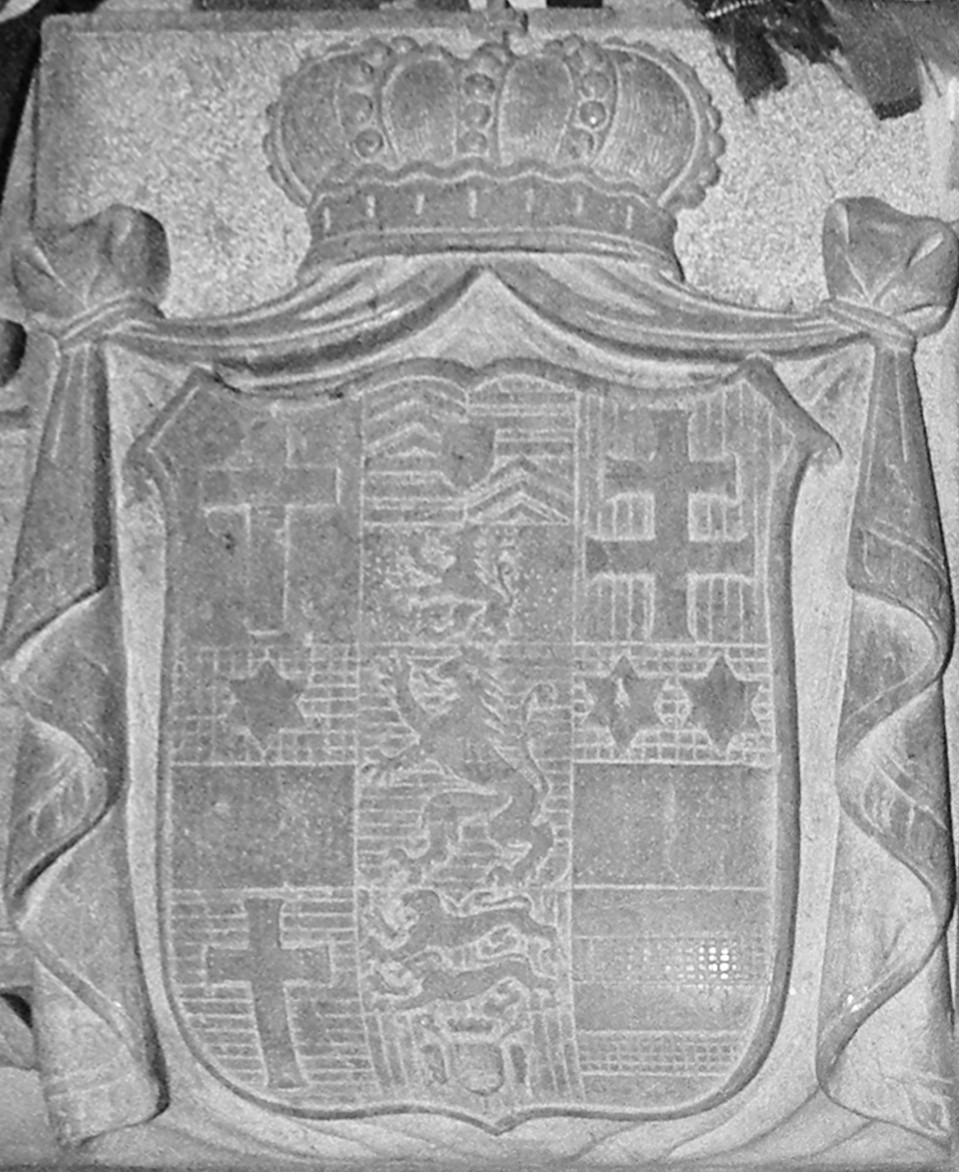
Coat of arms of Landgravine Charlotte Amalie of Hesse-Wanfried

The mini-state Hesse-Wanfried existed from about 1700 to 1731. It was a principality (Landgraviate) of the Holy Roman Empire in the area of the today's Land of Hesse. Governed by a cadet line of the House of Hesse under the sovereignty of the land of Hesse-Kassel.

== History ==
Maurice the Learned (1572–1632) was Landgrave of Hesse-Kassel from 1592 until 1627 when he abdicated in favour of his son William V (1602–1637), his younger sons receiving apanages which created several cadet lines of the house (Hesse-Rotenburg, Hesse-Eschwege and Hesse-Rheinfels), of which, with amalgamation, that of Hesse-Rheinfels-Rotenburg survived till 1834.

In 1627 Ernest (1623–1693), a younger son of Maurice, Landgrave of Hesse-Kassel (or Hesse-Cassel), received Rheinfels and lower Katzenelnbogen as his inheritance, and some years later, on the deaths of two of his brothers, Frederick, Landgrave of Hesse-Eschwege (1617–1655) and Herman IV, Landgrave of Hesse-Rotenburg (1607–1658), he added Eschwege, Rotenburg, Wanfried and other districts to his possessions. Ernest, who was a convert to the Roman Catholic Church, was a great traveller and a voluminous writer. About 1700 his two sons, William (d. 1725) and Charles (or Karl) (d. 1711), divided their territories, and founded the families of Hesse-Rotenburg and Hesse-Wanfried. The latter family died out in 1755, when William's grandson, Constantine (d. 1778), reunited the lands except Rheinfels, which had been acquired by Hesse-Kassel in 1735, and ruled them as Landgrave of Hesse-Rotenburg.

== The governing Landgraves of Hesse-Wanfried ==
- Charles, Landgrave of Hesse-Wanfried-(Rheinfels) (1649–1711); sovereign ~1700–1711
- William II, Landgrave of Hesse-Wanfried-Rheinfels (1671–1731); sovereign 1711–1731
- Christian, Landgrave of Hesse-Wanfried-Rheinfels (1689–1755); sovereign 1731–1755
