= Awet Tesfaiesus =

German politician (born 1974)

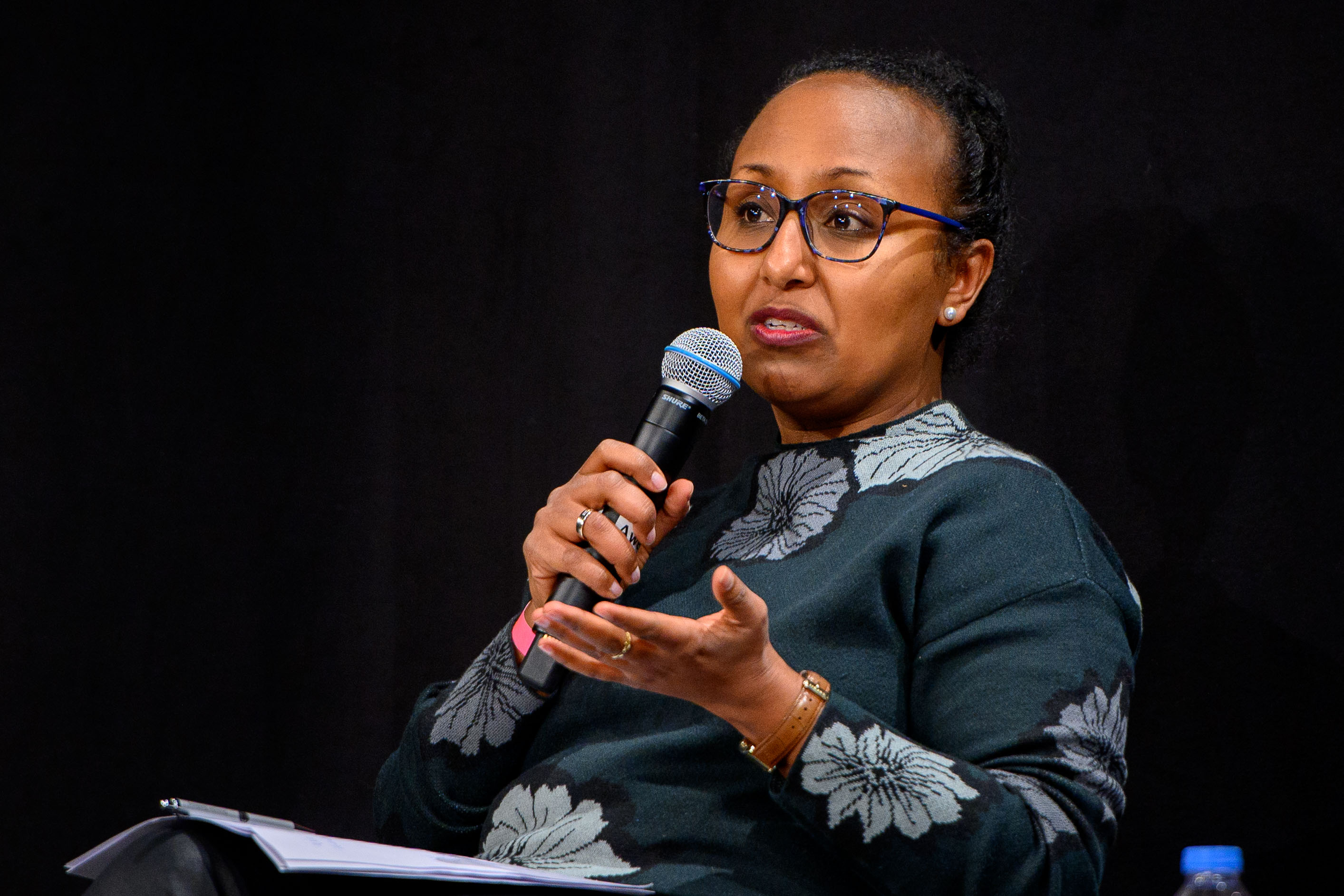
- Tesfaiesus in 2022

Member of the Bundestag for Hesse
- Incumbent
- Assumed office 26 September 2021
- Succeeded by: Multi-member district
- Constituency: Greens list

Personal details
- Born: 5 October 1974 (age 51) Asmara, Ethiopia
- Party: Greens
- Children: 1
- Education: Heidelberg University
- Occupation: Lawyer

Awet Tesfaiesus (Tigrinya: ዓወት ተስፋየሱስ; born 5 October 1974) is a German politician from Alliance 90/The Greens who serves as a member of the Bundestag from the state of Hesse since 2021. Previously a lawyer who represented asylum seekers and refugees, Tesfaiesus was elected as a city councillor for the city of Kassel in 2016. Tesfaiesus was elected in the 2021 German federal election and re-elected in the 2025 elections as a member of the Green Party list in the state of Hesse. She is the first black woman to ever be elected to the Bundestag and still after the 2025 election continues to be the only black woman serving in the federal Parliament of Germany.

== Political career ==
Tesfaiesus has been a member of Alliance 90/The Greens since 2009. After expressing concern over the Alternative for Germany's entry into the Kassel city council as a result of increased anti-immigrant sentiments, she decided to enter municipal politics to become a city councillor. She was elected to Kassel's city council in 2016 and introduced anti-discrimination legislation inspired by her experiences dealing with racism in her daily life. Tesfaiesus cited her experience of being shut out of being offered apartments due to her surname, only to have her German-born husband call and be accepted.

Tesfaiesus also cited the 2020 Hanau shootings, where a far-right extremist engaged in a racially motivated mass shooting in Hesse, her home state, as her reason for entering national politics. She had previously considered withdrawing from the political scene, but was incentivized to step forward in response to the xenophobic attacks.

Tesfaiesus ran as a direct candidate in Werra-Meißner – Hersfeld-Rotenburg constituency in the 2021 federal election and placed fourth. Tesfaiesus' campaign slogan was "courage to change". She was in ninth position on the Greens party list for the state of Hesse, and was elected to the Bundestag. Tesfaiesus became the first black woman elected to the Bundestag in what was a younger and more ethnically diverse Bundestag cohort than previously. In the 2025 federal election she was again elected to the Bundestag after she won a contested fifth place on the party list.

Tesfaiesus aims to remove barriers to naturalization within Germany, including lifting restrictions imposed by the dual citizenship status. Tesfaiesus wished to use her platform to demonstrate to people who did not "look German" that they had a place within Germany's society and political culture. In her second term Tesfaiesus serves on the Committee on Culture and the Media and on the Committee on Legal Affairs and Consumer Protection and leads the party's parliamentary work on AI, copyright law, artists' remuneration, digital discrimination and international aspects of cultural affairs.

== Other activities ==
- German Federal Film Board (FFA), Alternate Member of the Supervisory Board (since 2022)
- Deutschlandfunk, Member of the Supervisory Board
- Franco-German Parliamentary Assembly, Member
- Parliamentary Assembly of the Council of Europe, Member

== Personal life ==
Tesfaiesus was born in Asmara in 1974. Her family had sought asylum in Germany to escape political persecution, as her father was sought out by the Ethiopian police due to his support for Eritrean independence. Her family emigrated to the city of Heidelberg when Tesfaiesus was ten years old.

She received aid from individuals who supported her in her childhood, including teachers and church groups, and she decided to pursue a career which would help repay their efforts. In her everyday life, she experienced individuals who would initially speak to her in English assuming that she was a foreigner. Tesfaiesus eventually was able to become a German citizen, and after contemplating it in 1996, she subsequently accepted the offer.

Besides being fluent in German, Tigrinya and English, she speaks Arabic and French and understands some Hindi, Amharic and Hebrew. Tesfaiesus lives in a religiously diverse family with members being Catholic, Protestant, Christian Orthodox, Muslim, Jewish and humanist, while she herself is a member of the United Protestant church. Her first name means "victory" in the Tigrinya language.

Tesfaiesus studied law and moved to Kassel in northern Hesse, where she had lived for the past 20 years. Tesfaiesus primarily focuses on cases pertaining to foreigners and asylum law, and often represented asylum seekers and refugees.

Tesfaiesus had considered moving to Belgium with her 10-year-old son and husband following the Hanau shootings and the elevated xenophobia which had been the cause for the incident.

== See also ==
- Karamba Diaby, previously Germany's only black MP
