= Heldra =

- Village of Wanfried
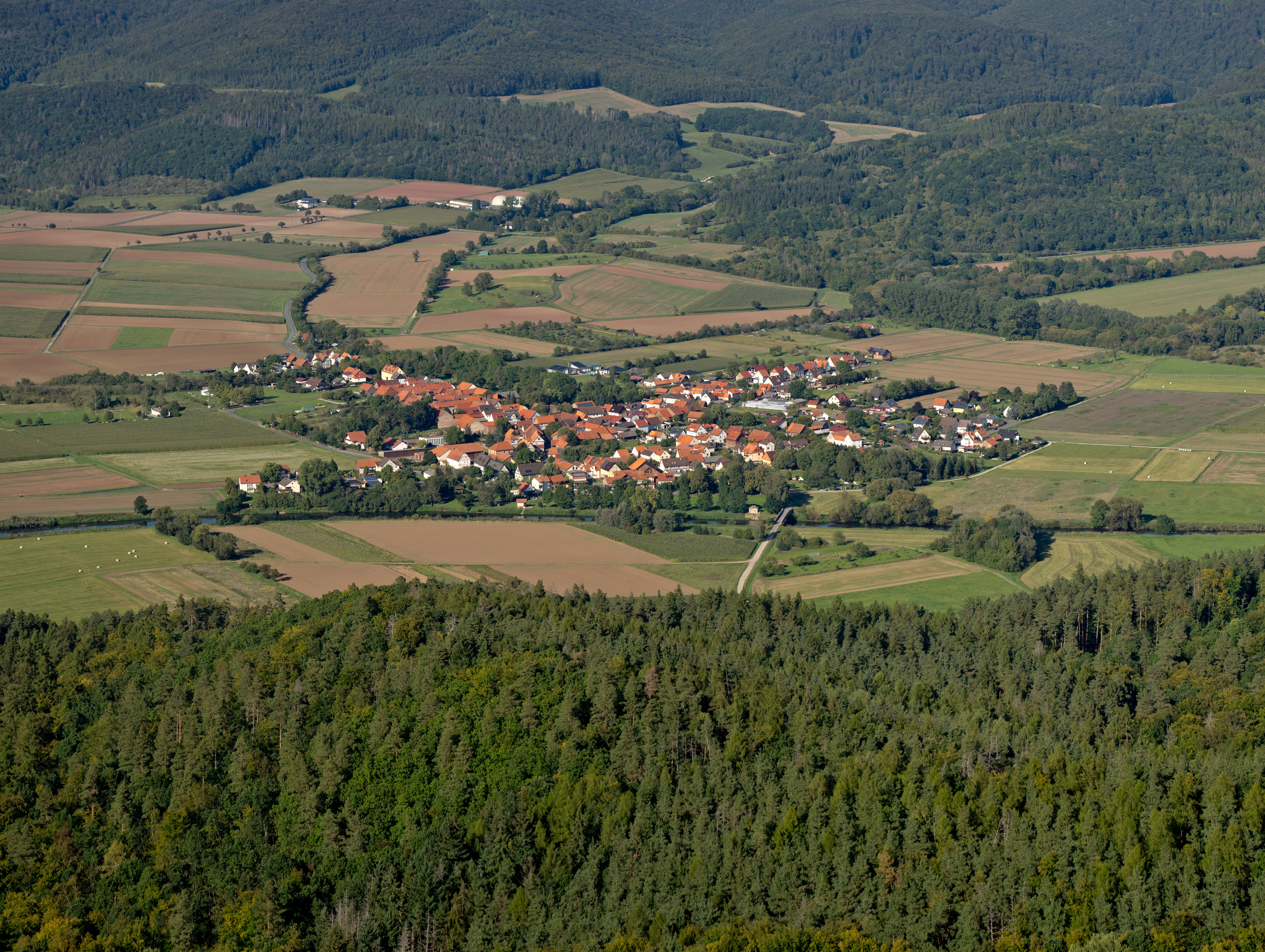
- View of Heldra
- Interactive map of Heldra
- Location within Germany Location within Hesse
- Coordinates: 51°7′39″N 10°11′46″E
- Country: Germany
- State: Hesse
- Admin. region: Kassel
- District: Werra-Meißner-Kreis
- Town: Wanfried
- Elevation: 173 m (568 ft)

Population (2013-12-31)
  - Total: 490
- Time zone: UTC+01:00 (CET)
  - Summer (DST): UTC+02:00 (CEST)
- Postal codes: 37281
- Dialling codes: 05655
- Vehicle registration: ESW
- Website: Website Town

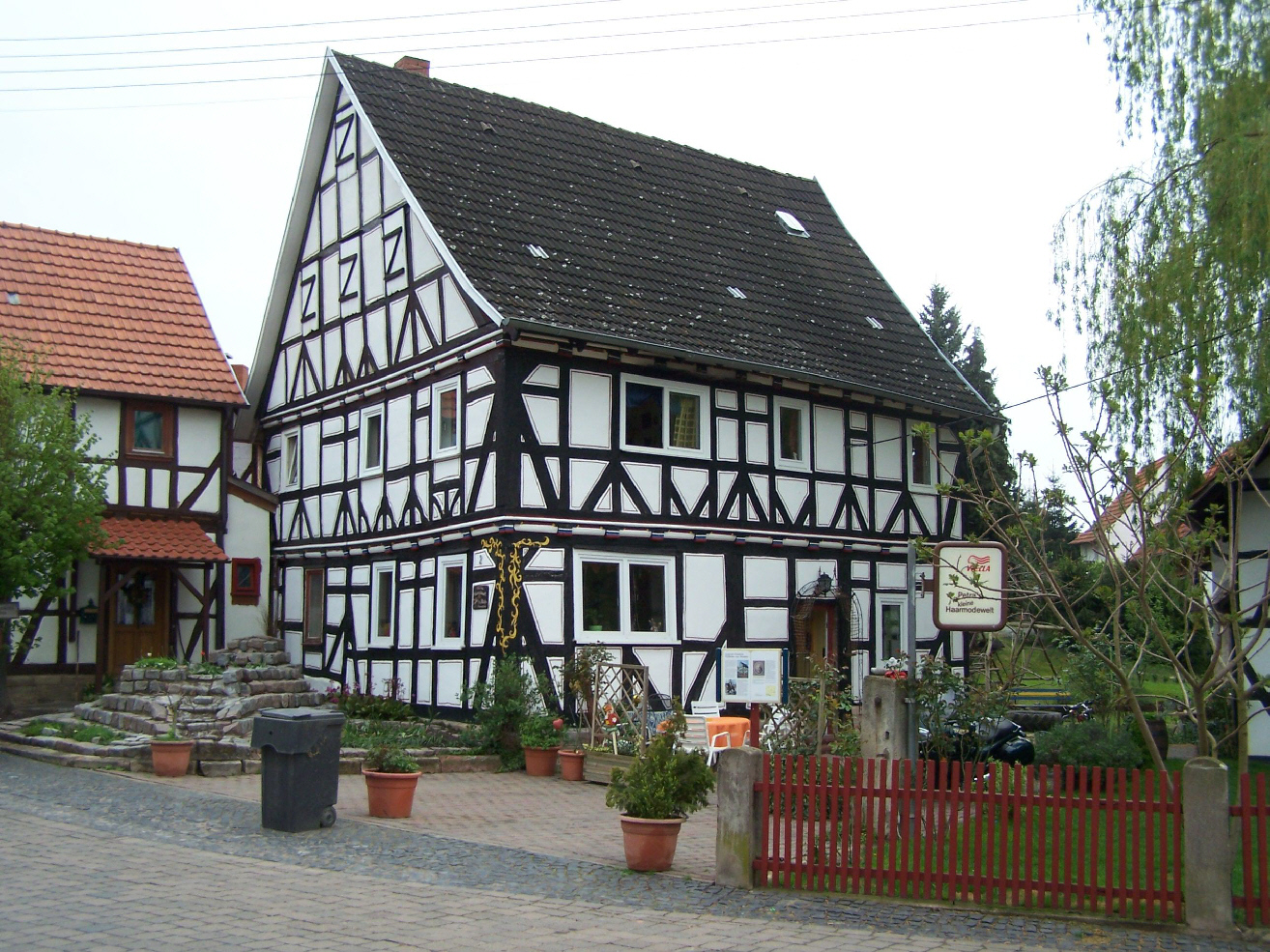
Steuben-Haus, family house of General von Steuben in Heldra

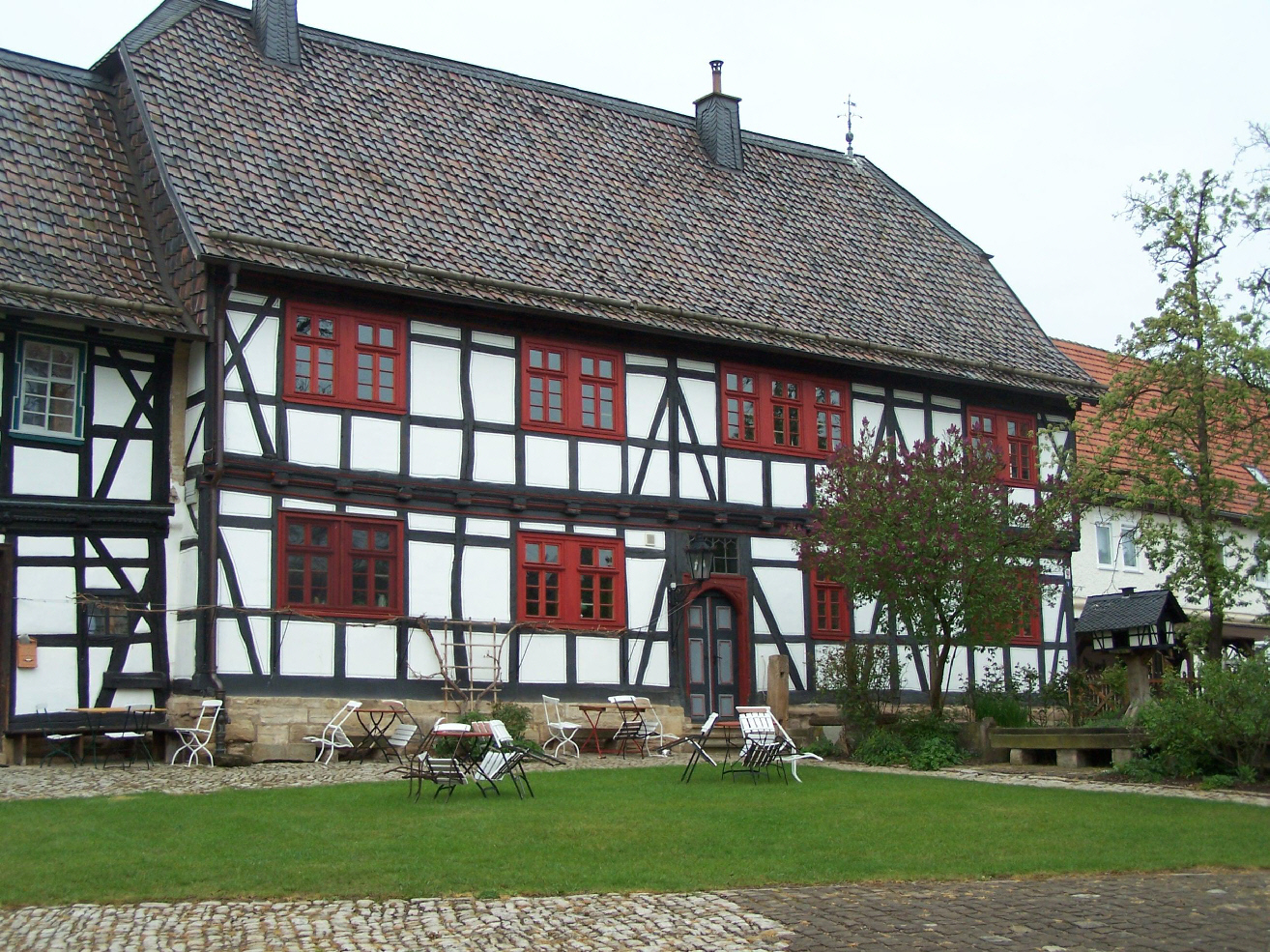
Franckesche Gut, family house of August Hermann Francke in Heldra

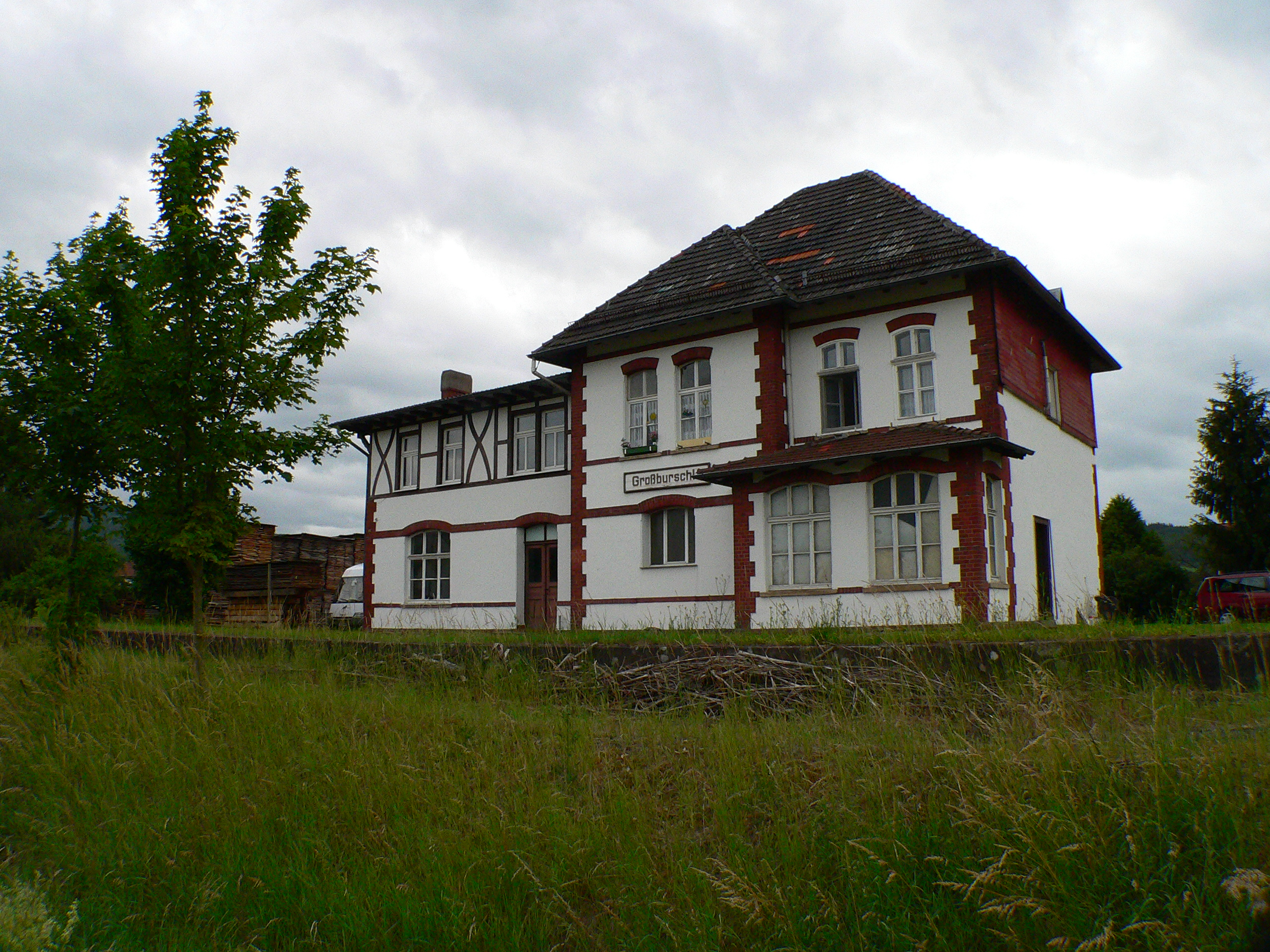
The former station of Großburschla, now part of Heldra

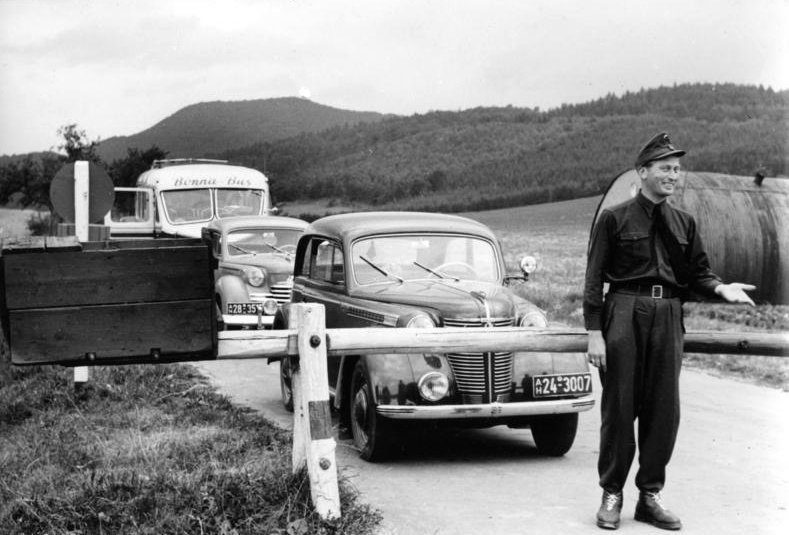
Inner-German frontier at Heldra (1952)

Heldra is a village in the Werra-Meißner-Kreis on northeastern edge of Hesse, Germany. For administrative purposes it has been, since 1972, part of Wanfried, but the district is a rural one and Wanfried is 7 km (4 miles) away to the north.

== Location ==
Heldra is on the eastern edge of Nordhessen which is the northern part of Hesse, at the point where the Heldra Brook (Heldrabach) joins the Werra River. Due to the irregular line followed here by the boundary between Hesse and Thuringia, Heldra is bordered to the west, south and east by Thuringia. Neighbouring towns and villages are Treffurt, Großburschla and Katharinenberg (all in Thuringia). Heldra's connection with Hesse is to the north via Bundesstraße 250.

The village now includes Bahnhof Großburschla(Großburschla Station). The station building is well preserved and the centre of a small settlement of some 60 inhabitants. It comprises several homes as well as a restaurant. Großburschla itself was separated from its railway station after July 1945, following the division of Germany into occupation zones and the subsequent de facto creation after 1949 of a progressively more firmly closed frontier through the middle of Germany under the terms of the Potsdam Agreement.

To the south, on the far side of the River Werra, is the 503 meter high steep sided Heldrastein from which Heldra takes its name. It is accessible for walkers via a footbridge over the river.

== History ==
The first surviving record of the place, then called “Heldron”, dates from 874. The name “Hellerbach” is applied in some later documents. Along the route that leads out of the village to its north is the so-called “Feldmühle” spot. The site of an abandoned village which according to local tradition was the site of Heldra until it was relocated in the fifteenth century to its present position, closer to the “Hellerburg” mountain.

In 1902 Heldra received a rail connection thanks to the construction of the 46 km (30 Mile) long rail link Schwebda–Wartha. However, the line was cut between Heldra and Treffurt when Germany was divided in 1945, and in 1970 the line was closed.

Between 1949 and 1990 Heldra was surrounded on three sides by the German Democratic Republic, and accessible to West Germany only from the north of the village. During the 1960s and 1970s Heldra became a favoured spot with West German visitors who came to peer across the closed and by this time fortified frontier into East Germany. Special “Information Pavilions” were set up to support the grim tourism.

Local topography made the frontier between the two Germanys irregular at this point, which became known as the “Heldrauer Zipfel”, and for East German border guards charged with preventing their fellow citizens from escaping to the west. The frontier presented particular challenges, while western camera teams also tended to descend on the area to film the border. East German houses had been cleared from places within sight of West Germany, but residents of nearby Großburschla nevertheless regularly passed within sight of “the west” on one stretch of road when traveling by bus or car.

These were under strict orders not to stop or react in any way if someone from the west waved across to them. Because of a small intervening mountain and the level of the road in relation to the position of the frontier, a 150-meter length of the border could not be seen from the observation towers set up to look out for possible escapees, and the section was therefore dependent on regular foot patrols. This was the scene of a notable escape in the early morning of 3 March 1989, less than nine months before the collapse of the separate eastern state. When an East German truck driver who knew the area well, managed to smuggle a long metal tube hidden as part of a small crane fitted to his truck, and use it to get over the first of the two fences divided by the “no-man’s land” frontier strip on the eastern side of the frontier, and to cross an unmined section of the territory only to find, when he reached the second fence, that it was too high for him to get over it.

He encountered an unaccompanied guard dog, but managed, to his own astonishment, to befriend it. He then spotted that the roof on the dog's kennel was coming loose, and by detaching it was able to improvise a step that enabled him to clear the second fence and quickly disappeared into the wooded area on the Hessian (western) side of the border.

The man succeeded and so the story is known, but attempting the escape from East Germany was nevertheless a life-threatening project for those who undertook it.

Once Soviet control over East Germany ended, the village could concentrate on less deadly forms of competition and in 2003 it was the Regional Winner of the “Unser Dorf” (“Our Village”) competition. A year later, in 2004, Heldra won a silver medal in the national “Unser Dorf soll schöner werden – unser Dorf hat Zukunft“(“Our village shall be more beautiful - our village has [a bright] future“) competition.

=== Buildings and other features of interest ===
The village contains many traditional style half-timbered houses including the ancestral homes of the philanthropist and scholar August Hermann Francke and of the Prussian hero of the American Independence War, Friedrich Wilhelm von Steuben.

Also worth a mention are the nearby Heldrastein Mountain and the village's own museum.

=== Celebrity Connections ===
Heldra was the birthplace of a notorious bandit (Räuber) called Florien Henning, whose notoriety was enhanced by a song (in German):

=== Regular events ===
- "Strohbärenfest" (“Straw Bear Festival”) in Heldra (on Ash Wednesday)
