= Werra-Meißner – Hersfeld-Rotenburg =

Federal electoral district of Germany

168 Werra-Meißner – Hersfeld-Rotenburg
- Electoral district for the Bundestag
- Werra-Meißner – Hersfeld-Rotenburg in 2025
- State: Hesse
- Population: 221,300 (2019)
- Electorate: 171,886 (2021)
- Major settlements: Bad Hersfeld; Eschwege; Witzenhausen
- Area: 2,122.6 km^{2}

Current electoral district
- Created: 2002
- Party: CDU
- Member: Wilhelm Gebhard
- Elected: 2025

Werra-Meißner – Hersfeld-Rotenburg is an electoral constituency (German: Wahlkreis) represented in the Bundestag. It elects one member via first-past-the-post voting. Under the current constituency numbering system, it is designated as constituency 168. It is located in northern Hesse, comprising the Werra-Meißner-Kreis and Hersfeld-Rotenburg districts.

Werra-Meißner – Hersfeld-Rotenburg was created for the 2002 federal election. From 2002 to 2025, it was represented by Michael Roth of the Social Democratic Party (SPD). Since 2025 it has been represented by Wilhelm Gebhard of the CDU.

== Geography ==
Werra-Meißner – Hersfeld-Rotenburg is located in northern Hesse. As of the 2021 federal election, it comprises the Werra-Meißner-Kreis and Hersfeld-Rotenburg districts.

== History ==
Werra-Meißner – Hersfeld-Rotenburg was created in 2002 and contained parts of the abolished constituencies of Hersfeld and Werra-Meißner. In the 2002 election, it was named Werra-Meißner – Hersfeld. It acquired its current name in the 2005 election. In the 2002 and 2005 elections, it was constituency 171 in the numbering system. In the 2009 election, it was number 170. In the 2013 through 2021 elections, it was number 169. From the 2025 election, it has been number 168. Its borders have not changed since its creation.

Election	No.	Name	Borders
2002	171	Werra-Meißner – Hersfeld	Werra-Meißner-Kreis district; Hersfeld-Rotenburg district
2005	171	Werra-Meißner – Hersfeld-Rotenburg	Werra-Meißner-Kreis district; Hersfeld-Rotenburg district
2009	170	Werra-Meißner – Hersfeld-Rotenburg	Werra-Meißner-Kreis district; Hersfeld-Rotenburg district
2013	169	Werra-Meißner – Hersfeld-Rotenburg	Werra-Meißner-Kreis district; Hersfeld-Rotenburg district
2017	169	Werra-Meißner – Hersfeld-Rotenburg	Werra-Meißner-Kreis district; Hersfeld-Rotenburg district
2021	169	Werra-Meißner – Hersfeld-Rotenburg	Werra-Meißner-Kreis district; Hersfeld-Rotenburg district
2025	168	Werra-Meißner – Hersfeld-Rotenburg	Werra-Meißner-Kreis district; Hersfeld-Rotenburg district

== Members ==
The constituency has been represented by Michael Roth of the Social Democratic Party (SPD) since its creation.

Election	Member	Party	%
2002	Michael Roth	SPD	54.9
2005	Michael Roth	SPD	51.7
2009	Michael Roth	SPD	40.4
2013	Michael Roth	SPD	43.1
2017	Michael Roth	SPD	41.2
2021	Michael Roth	SPD	43.7
2025	Wilhelm Gebhard	CDU	32.2

== Election results ==
=== 2025 election ===
Federal election (2025): Werra-Meißner – Hersfeld-Rotenburg
Notes:	Blue background denotes the winner of the electorate vote. Pink background denotes a candidate elected from their party list. Yellow background denotes an electorate win by a list member, or other incumbent. A ✓ or ✗ denotes status of any incumbent, win or lose respectively.						
Party	Candidate	Votes	%	±%	Party votes	%	±%
CDU	Wilhelm Gebhard	44,170	32.2	▲5.5	38,981	28.4	▲6.8
AfD	Gerhard Schenk	30,924	22.6	▲11.6	31,856	23.2	▲11.7
SPD	Daniel Iliev	38,010	27.8	▼15.9	30,447	22.3	▼15.5
Greens	Awet Tesfaiesus	7,357	5.4	▼0.9	9,947	7.3	▼1.7
Left	Silvia Hable	7,245	5.3	▲2.3	8,575	6.3	▲2.7
BSW					5,724	4.2	New
FDP	Alexander Bartholomäus	3,326	2.4	▼3.1	5,247	3.8	▼6.1
FW	Anja Zilch	3,961	2.9	▲0.4	2,779	2.0	▼0.1
Tierschutzpartei					1,743	1.3	▼0.1
Volt	Phil Rimbach	1,367	1.0	New	954	0.7	▲0.5
Independent	Benjamin Jäger	602	0.4	New			
PARTEI					594	0.4	▼0.3
BD					227	0.2	New
Humanists					81	0.1	0.0
MLPD					26	<0.1	0.0
Informal votes		1,651			1,432		
Total valid votes		136,962			137,181		
Turnout		138,613	82.6	▲6.5			
CDU gain from SPD	Majority	6,160	4.4	N/A			

=== 2021 election ===
Federal election (2021): Werra-Meißner – Hersfeld-Rotenburg
Notes:	Blue background denotes the winner of the electorate vote. Pink background denotes a candidate elected from their party list. Yellow background denotes an electorate win by a list member, or other incumbent. A ✓ or ✗ denotes status of any incumbent, win or lose respectively.						
Party	Candidate	Votes	%	±%	Party votes	%	±%
SPD	✓ Michael Roth	56,383	43.7	▲2.5	48,579	37.7	▲5.0
CDU	Wilhelm Gebhard	34,527	26.8	▼3.2	27,867	21.6	▼7.8
AfD	Gerhard Schenk	14,204	11.0	▼1.5	14,899	11.5	▼1.6
Greens	Awet Tesfaiesus	8,032	6.2	▲2.2	11,595	9.0	▲3.0
FDP	Jorias Bach	7,135	5.5	▲0.5	12,807	9.9	▲1.5
Left	Sabine Leidig	3,890	3.0	▼2.5	4,524	3.5	▼3.2
FW	Rainer Janisch	3,160	2.4	▲0.6	2,734	2.1	▲1.2
Tierschutzpartei					1,776	1.4	▲0.6
dieBasis	Beate Gerke	1,430	1.1		1,344	1.0	
PARTEI					988	0.8	▲0.1
Pirates					343	0.3	▼0.1
Volt					313	0.2	
Gesundheitsforschung					210	0.2	
Bündnis C					204	0.2	
NPD					201	0.2	▼0.3
Team Todenhöfer					198	0.2	
ÖDP					121	0.1	0.0
Bündnis 21	Berthold Hartmann	172	0.1		90	0.1	
Independent	Heidi Schmidt	107	0.1				
Humanists					81	0.1	
V-Partei3					71	0.1	▼0.1
MLPD					35	0.0	0.0
DKP					24	0.0	0.0
LKR					22	0.0	
Informal votes		1,865			1,879		
Total valid votes		129,040			129,026		
Turnout		130,905	76.2	▲0.2			
SPD hold	Majority	21,856	16.9	▲5.7			

=== 2017 election ===
Federal election (2017): Werra-Meißner – Hersfeld-Rotenburg
Notes:	Blue background denotes the winner of the electorate vote. Pink background denotes a candidate elected from their party list. Yellow background denotes an electorate win by a list member, or other incumbent. A ✓ or ✗ denotes status of any incumbent, win or lose respectively.						
Party	Candidate	Votes	%	±%	Party votes	%	±%
SPD	✓ Michael Roth	54,033	41.2	▼1.9	42,737	32.6	▼4.3
CDU	Timo Lübeck	39,302	29.9	▼10.6	38,531	29.4	▼6.6
AfD	Stefan Wild	16,411	12.5		17,173	13.1	▲7.5
Left	Sabine Leidig	7,281	5.5	▼0.2	8,746	6.7	▲0.7
FDP	Manfred Lister	6,594	5.0	▲3.0	11,096	8.5	▲4.5
Greens	Martina Selzer	5,236	4.0	▼1.0	7,843	6.0	▼1.0
FW	Emmanuel Anyangwe Ngassa	2,375	1.8		1,229	0.9	▲0.2
Tierschutzpartei					1,031	0.8	
PARTEI					854	0.7	▲0.2
NPD					608	0.5	▼1.1
Pirates					430	0.3	▼1.2
DM					210	0.2	
BGE					202	0.2	
V-Partei³					147	0.1	
ÖDP					135	0.1	
MLPD					35	0.0	0.0
DKP					33	0.0	
BüSo					27	0.0	0.0
Informal votes		2,494			2,659		
Total valid votes		131,232			131,067		
Turnout		133,726	76.0	▲3.0			
SPD hold	Majority	14,731	11.3	▲8.7			

=== 2013 election ===
Federal election (2013): Werra-Meißner – Hersfeld-Rotenburg
Notes:	Blue background denotes the winner of the electorate vote. Pink background denotes a candidate elected from their party list. Yellow background denotes an electorate win by a list member, or other incumbent. A ✓ or ✗ denotes status of any incumbent, win or lose respectively.						
Party	Candidate	Votes	%	±%	Party votes	%	±%
SPD	✓ Michael Roth	54,630	43.1	▲2.7	46,913	36.9	▲2.5
CDU	Helmut Heiderich	51,386	40.5	▲5.9	45,872	36.0	▲5.8
Left	Johanna Scheringer-Wright	7,277	5.7	▼2.7	7,584	6.0	▼3.8
Greens	Armin Jung	6,333	5.0	▼0.7	8,868	7.0	▼1.1
AfD					7,096	5.6	
FDP	Manfred Lister	2,513	2.0	▼7.3	5,014	3.9	▼9.3
NPD	Gisela Lück	2,392	1.9	▲0.3	2,013	1.6	▲0.1
Pirates	Michael Balke	2,283	1.8		1,954	1.5	▲0.1
FW					961	0.8	
PARTEI					521	0.4	
REP					170	0.1	▼0.2
PRO					136	0.1	
BüSo					55	0.0	▼0.1
SGP					55	0.0	
MLPD					41	0.0	0.0
Informal votes		4,632			4,193		
Total valid votes		126,814			127,253		
Turnout		131,446	72.9	▼0.7			
SPD hold	Majority	3,244	2.6	▼3.2			

=== 2009 election ===
Federal election (2009): Werra-Meißner – Hersfeld-Rotenburg
Notes:	Blue background denotes the winner of the electorate vote. Pink background denotes a candidate elected from their party list. Yellow background denotes an electorate win by a list member, or other incumbent. A ✓ or ✗ denotes status of any incumbent, win or lose respectively.						
Party	Candidate	Votes	%	±%	Party votes	%	±%
SPD	✓ Michael Roth	53,275	40.4	▼11.4	45,401	34.4	▼10.9
CDU	Helmut Heiderich (Note: Heiderich entered the Bundestag on the CDU list after the resignation of Holger Haibach in March 2011.)	45,711	34.6	▲0.3	39,966	30.3	▲0.4
FDP	Thomas Fehling	12,290	9.3	▲5.4	17,526	13.3	▲4.5
Left	Mareike Zingsem	11,080	8.4	▲3.9	12,927	9.8	▲3.9
Greens	Philipp Schmagold	7,530	5.7	▲2.8	10,679	8.1	▲1.4
Pirates					1,948	1.5	
NPD	Konrad Bentz	2,128	1.6	0.0	1,939	1.5	▼0.1
Tierschutzpartei					1,004	0.8	▲0.1
REP					422	0.3	▼0.3
BüSo					155	0.1	0.0
DVU					95	0.1	
MLPD					35	0.0	0.0
Informal votes		3,713			3,630		
Total valid votes		132,014			132,097		
Turnout		135,727	73.6	▼5.5			
SPD hold	Majority	7,564	5.8	▼11.6			

=== 2005 election ===
Federal election (2005):Werra-Meißner – Hersfeld-Rotenburg
Notes:	Blue background denotes the winner of the electorate vote. Pink background denotes a candidate elected from their party list. Yellow background denotes an electorate win by a list member, or other incumbent. A ✓ or ✗ denotes status of any incumbent, win or lose respectively.						
Party	Candidate	Votes	%	±%	Party votes	%	±%
SPD	✓ Michael Roth	75,269	51.7	▼3.2	65,876	45.2	▼4.4
CDU	Helmut Heiderich	49,882	34.3	▼1.1	43,457	29.8	▼2.9
Left	Ines Wolf	6,514	4.5	▲3.3	8,622	5.9	▲4.8
FDP	Thomas Fehling	5,699	3.9	▼0.9	12,750	8.8	▲1.7
Greens	Jörg Althoff	4,283	2.9	▼0.5	9,804	6.7	▲0.1
NPD	Konrad Bentz	2,402	1.7		2,234	1.5	▲1.2
Independent	Wolfhard Austen	1,467	1.0				
Tierschutzpartei					1,000	0.7	▲0.2
REP					888	0.6	0.0
GRAUEN					515	0.4	▲0.2
SGP					217	0.1	
BüSo					164	0.1	▲0.1
MLPD					67	0.0	
Informal votes		3,958			3,880		
Total valid votes		145,516			145,594		
Turnout		149,474	79.1	▼1.3			
SPD hold	Majority	25,387	17.4				
