= Wilhelm Gebhard =

German politician (born 1976)

Wilhelm Gebhard MdB
- Gebhard in 2019

Member of the Bundestag; for Werra-Meißner – Hersfeld-Rotenburg
- Incumbent
- Assumed office 25 March 2025
- Preceded by: Michael Roth

Personal details
- Born: 15 June 1976 (age 50) Eschwege, West Germany
- Party: Christian Democratic Union
- Children: 2

Wilhelm Gebhard (born 15 June 1976) is a German politician who was elected as a member of the Bundestag in 2025. He has served as mayor of Wanfried since 2007.
