= Michael Roth (politician) =

German politician (born 1970)

- Official portrait, 2015

Chair of the Bundestag Foreign Affairs Committee
- In office 15 December 2021 – 25 March 2025
- Preceded by: Norbert Röttgen
- Succeeded by: Armin Laschet

Minister of State for Europe
- In office 17 December 2013 – 8 December 2021
- Minister: Frank-Walter Steinmeier; Sigmar Gabriel; Heiko Maas
- Preceded by: Michael Georg Link
- Succeeded by: Anna Lührmann

Member of the Bundestag
- In office 26 October 1998 – 25 March 2025
- Preceded by: Berthold Wittich
- Succeeded by: Wilhelm Gebhard
- Constituency: Hersfeld (1998–2002); Werra-Meißner – Hersfeld (2002–2005); Werra-Meißner – Hersfeld-Rotenburg (2005–2025)

Personal details
- Born: Michael Helmut Roth; 24 August 1970 (age 56) Heringen, West Germany
- Party: Social Democratic
- Spouse: Michael Klöppner (m. 2012)
- Education: Goethe University Frankfurt

Michael Helmut Roth (born 24 August 1970) is a German politician of the Social Democratic Party of Germany (SPD) who served as a member of the German Bundestag from 1998 to 2025.

From 2013 to 2021 Roth also served as Minister of State for Europe at the German Federal Foreign Office in the government of Chancellor Angela Merkel. From January 2014 to 2021 he was the German government's Commissioner for Franco-German Cooperation.

== Personal life and academic career ==
Roth obtained his Abitur (higher education entrance qualification) at the Werratal secondary school in Heringen in 1990. After completing non-military national service, he began studying political science, public law, sociology, and German language and literature at the Johann Goethe University of Frankfurt am Main in 1991. He was awarded a scholarship from the Friedrich Ebert Foundation and graduated with a degree in political science in 1997.

He worked as a tutor at the Center for North American Studies and in the Faculty of Social Sciences at Goethe University Frankfurt am Main until 1998 and as a lecturer at the Otto Suhr Institute of Political Science at the Freie Universität Berlin from 2000 to 2002.

== Political career ==
=== Party posts (1987–present) ===
Roth joined the Social Democratic Party of Germany (SPD) as a pupil in 1987. In his party he served as Deputy Federal Chairperson of the Young Socialists (youth section of the SPD) from 1993 to 1995. He was a member of the executive committee of the North Hesse district branch of the SPD from 1996 to 2015, Chairman of the Hersfeld-Rotenburg subdistrict branch of the SPD from 2001 to 2011 and Secretary-General of the Hesse Land branch of the SPD from 2009 to 2014.

Roth was a member of the Executive Committee of the Hesse Land branch of the SPD from 2015 to 2019 and a member of the Executive Committee of the SPD from 2017 to 2023.

On 2 July 2019, Roth announced that he would be standing for election as SPD Chairperson in tandem with fellow party member Christina Kampmann. Campaigning under the slogan "With heart and steadfastness. Working together to launch a fresh start." they called for, among other things, an end to the balanced budget policy, more gender equality, a fundamental reform of the party, security in the digital transformation and the United States of Europe. The Kampmann/Roth duo received 16.3 percent of members' votes in the first round. They came in third and therefore did not qualify for the second-round run-off.

=== Member of the German Bundestag (1998–2025) ===
Roth became a member of the German Bundestag for the first time in 1998, entering as the directly elected representative of the Hersfeld constituency with 51.7 percent of the first vote. In 2002 he was re-elected to the Bundestag with 54.9 percent of the first vote of the newly merged constituency of Werra-Meißner – Hersfeld-Rotenburg. In subsequent elections he received 51.7 percent (2005), 40.4 percent (2009), 43.1 (2013) and 41.2 (2017) of the first vote.

From the beginning of his parliamentary work, Roth served on the Committee on the Affairs of the European Union. From 2010 to 2013, Roth served as spokesperson on European policy for the SPD parliamentary group in the Bundestag.

From 2009 to 2014 and again from 2017 to 2018, Roth chaired the group of SPD parliamentarians from Hesse in the Bundestag. He also belongs to the Parliamentary Left, a left-wing movement within the group.

Roth was elected as lead candidate for the Social Democrats in Hesse for the 2013 elections on 9 March 2013 at a SPD party conference in Hanau, where he gained 89 percent of the votes. In the ensuing negotiations to form a coalition government he was a member of the joint CDU, CSU and SPD working group on foreign affairs, defence and development cooperation, led by Thomas de Maizière and Frank-Walter Steinmeier.

For the 2017 elections, 95 percent of the delegates at the SPD regional conference in Kassel voted to make him lead candidate for Hesse. During the coalition negotiations between the CDU, CSU and SPD, he chaired the working group on the arts, culture, creative industries and the media and was a member of the working group on Europe. For the 2021 elections, he was elected to lead the SPD campaign in Hesse again.

=== Minister of State for Europe (2013–2021) ===
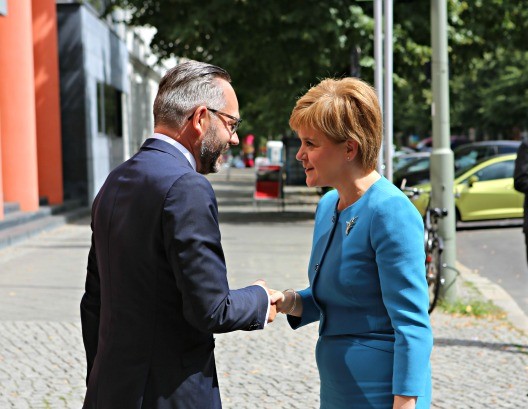
Michael Roth meeting Nicola Sturgeon, First Minister of Scotland

On 17 December 2013, Roth was appointed Minister of State for Europe at the German Federal Foreign Office, first in the third Merkel Cabinet. From January 2014 he was also the Commissioner for Franco-German Cooperation.

As Minister of State for Europe, Roth was the deputy to the Federal Minister for Foreign Affairs. In this function he served under three Federal Ministers for Foreign Affairs Frank-Walter Steinmeier (2013–2017), Sigmar Gabriel (2017–2018) and Heiko Maas (2018–2021). He was responsible for all EU matters, Eastern Europe, the Western Balkan countries, Russia, Turkey, human rights issues, the interfaith dialogue, Jewish life as well as international LGBTI and Roma issues.

As chairman of the State Secretaries Committee for European Affairs, Roth participated in the Federal Government's Cabinet meetings. He also represents the Federal Government on the EU’s General Affairs Council.

In April 2017, Roth was elected chairman of the Party of European Socialists’ GAC Ministers network, succeeding Harlem Désir.

In the negotiations to form a so-called traffic light coalition of the SPD, the Green Party and the Free Democratic Party (FDP) following the 2021 federal elections, Roth was part of his party's delegation in the working group on European affairs, co-chaired by Udo Bullmann, Franziska Brantner and Nicola Beer.

=== Chair of the Committee on Foreign Affairs (2021–2025) ===
Since 2021, Roth has been chairing the Committee on Foreign Affairs, succeeding Norbert Röttgen. In this capacity, he visited Ukraine shortly after the 2022 Russian invasion with Anton Hofreiter and Marie-Agnes Strack-Zimmermann, the chairs of parliament's European affairs and defense committees respectively.

In March 2024, Roth announced that he would not stand in the 2025 federal elections but instead resign from active politics by the end of the parliamentary term.

In May 2024, as response to protests in Georgia he visited Tbilisi and arrived to the rally held on Rustaveli avenue. His statements rapidly became a target of critics by Government officials and Orthodox Church of Georgia. Roth returned to Tbilisi in November 2024, along with MPs from seven other EU member states, to criticize alleged irregularities in the Georgian parliamentary election and express solidarity with Georgian citizens who support integration with the EU. The members of the delegation spoke at a rally in front of the parliament building and had a meeting with president Salome Zourabichvili.

In November 2024, following the Lithuanian parliamentary election, Roth criticized the decision of the Lithuanian Social Democratic Party to invite the nationalist Dawn of Nemunas party into the ruling coalition. The latter party's founder, Remigijus Žemaitaitis, is known for his antisemitic remarks.

== Political positions ==
On the sidelines of an informal U.N. General Assembly meeting on the rising threat of antisemitism in January 2015, Roth joined his French counterpart Harlem Désir in appealing for U.N. member states to work together on an international legal framework that would make social network providers share responsibility for the use of their platforms to spread messages promoting violence; the French call for a radical shift in the way governments treat social networking companies such as Facebook and Twitter came two weeks after the Charlie Hebdo shooting in Paris.

Amid the Greek government-debt crisis, Roth visited Greece six times within his first year in office. On the occasion of the first visit to the country by a German minister after Greeks elected the radical left-wing government of Prime Minister Alexis Tsipras in early 2015, Roth publicly warned the new government of risking its isolation in the European Union by threatening to break ranks on the EU sanctions against Russia over the Russo-Ukrainian war and ditch its bailout deal. He also urged Greece to end its prolonged spat with the European Central Bank, saying ECB President Mario Draghi is an ally in the country's struggle for funding and that both Europe and the Greek government need to avoid letting the standoff drift to a point of a Greek exit by accident. He has repeatedly pointed out that keeping Greece in the euro "is the focus of all of our efforts, though it’s up to the Greek government first and foremost to do its part".

== Other activities ==
=== Non-profit organizations ===
- Center for International Peace Operations (ZIF), Chairman of the Supervisory Board (2013–2021)
- Franco-German Institute Ludwigsburg (dfi), Member of the Executive Committee (2013–2021)
- German Foundation for Peace Research (DSF), Member of the Board of Trustees (2013–2021)
- Institute for European Politics (IEP), Member of the Board of Trustees
- International Journalists’ Programmes (IJP), Member of the Board of Trustees
- Foundation Flight, Expulsion, Reconciliation (SFVV), Member of the Board of Trustees
- Foundation Adam von Trott, Imshausen e.V., Member of the Advisory Council

=== Religious bodies ===
- Evangelical Church of Hesse Electorate-Waldeck (EKKW), Member of the Synod
- Evangelical Church in Germany (EKD), Member of the Chamber for Public Responsibility

== Controversy ==
In 2020, Roth criticised Hungary and Poland for an erosion of democratic culture and also said one aspect that “led to the Article 7 case against Hungary was rampant anti-semitism in Hungary”; in response, Hungary’s Minister of Foreign Affairs Péter Szijjártó summoned the German ambassador to a meeting to explain the remarks.
