= Stuffo =

Stuffo is the name of a supposed Germanic god, who originates from various late medieval legends from Germany related to Saint Boniface.

== Origin ==
Stuffo first appears in a few late medieval/early modern Bonifacian legends. A 1756 image of the god being overthrown by the saint is found in the village of Küllstedt. The legend was taken up by German Romanticism in the 18th and 19th centuries, which saw in Stuffo even a legendary origin for noble families like the Stauffenbergs. Such etymologies and myths of origin are no longer accepted.

== Locations and backstory ==
Two mountain-top locations have been proposed as sites of worship for Stuffo: the Staufenberg near Gießen, in Hesse; and the Stuffenberg, now Hülfensberg, in the Eichsfeld district, Thuringia. At any rate, there are over half a dozen mountains of a similar name in Hesse alone (stouf meaning something like "sharp mountain peak").

The source for the latter designation comes from the 1602 Historia S. Bonifacii by Johannes Letzner, who claims that after Boniface destroyed the Donar Oak near Geismar (now in Fritzlar, Hesse) he traveled to the Stuffenberg in Eichsfeld, where the god Stuffo was worshiped by the local population. Boniface fought and defeated the god, who fell into a hole, still called "Stuffo's hole," a story retold by Johann Nepomuk Seppin Die Religion der alten Deutschen (1890). Afterward, Boniface turned the pagan place of worship into a church in which he placed a priest to teach Christianity to the locals. Later versions expand on the account, conflating it with popular myth about Charlemagne; Erfurt bishop Nikolaus Elgard wrote in 1575 that "der heilige Bonifatius dort ein Götzenbild, durch das ein Dämon redete mit Namen Stauff, zerstört und bei dem Berge ein Heer der Ungläubigen geschlagen habe. Darum nannte er den Berg Hülfensberg (Inde salvatus salvatoris montem vocavit)" ("there, Saint Boniface destroyed an image of a god through which a demon called Stauff spoke, and at the mountain he defeated an army of unbelievers, which is why he named the mountain Hülfensberg"). A nineteenth-century Eichsfeld historian, Dr. Konrad Zehrt, combines the Donar Oak and the Stuffo accounts, and locates them both on the Hülfensberg.

== Etymology ==
Various etymologies were offered for the name, including derivation from the Middle High German word sûfen ("drinking to excess"), which led to Stuffo being associated with drunkenness. Graf's Gardenstone, which accepts Stuffo's existence, lists Becher ("drinking cup") as a possible etymology. However, as early as 1802, Eichsfeld historian Johann Vinzenz Wolf had stated that "seine Gottheit hat Stuffo der falschen Deutung des Wortes Stuffenberg zu verdanken" ("Stuffo owes his divinity to a false interpretation of the name Stuffenberg").
