= Hülfensberg =

- Stuffenberg
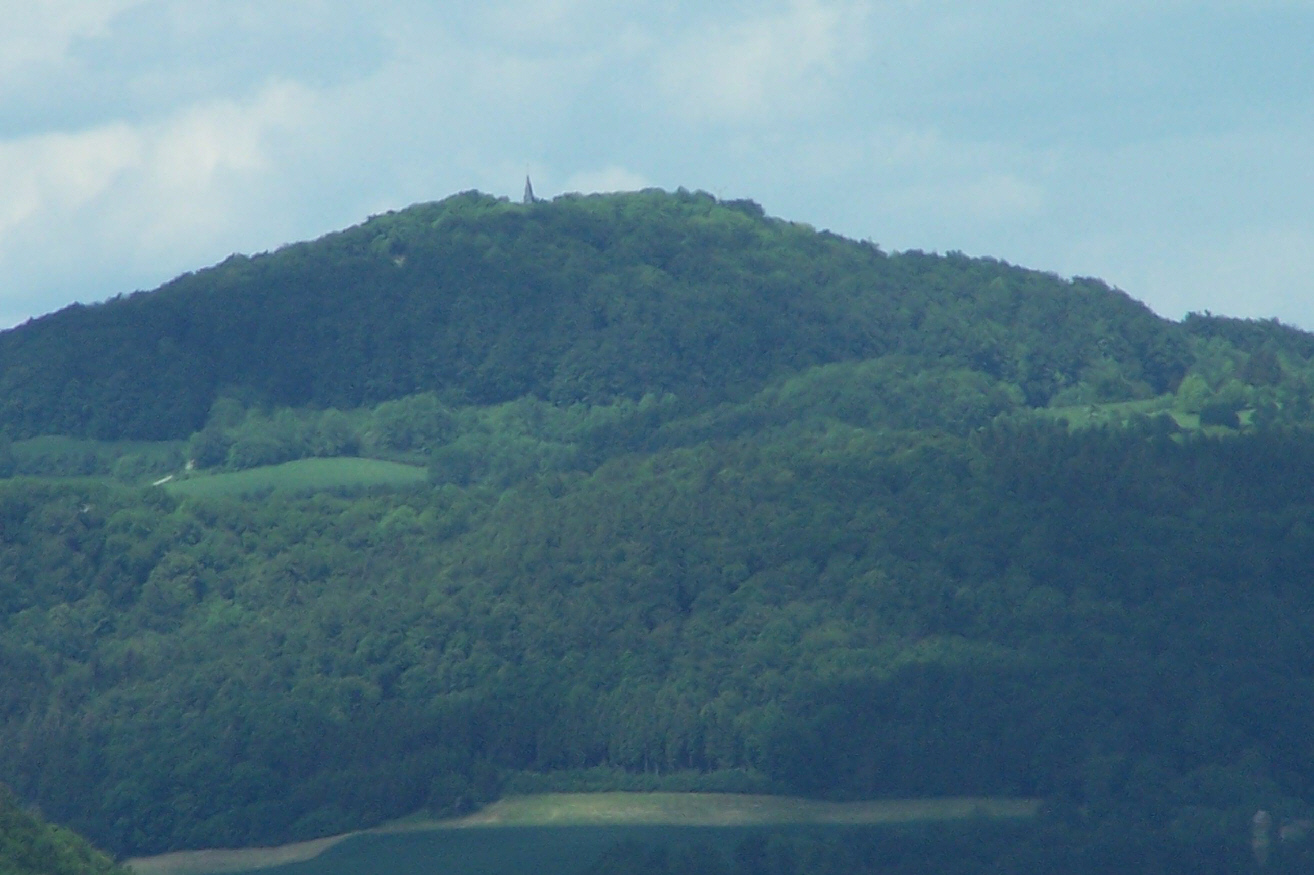
- Hülfensberg, view from east, 2009

Highest point
- Elevation: 448 m (1,470 ft)
- Coordinates: 51°13′8″N 10°9′29″E

Geography
- Location within Germany
- Location: Geismar, Eichsfeld; Thuringia, Germany

Geology
- Rock age: Triassic

The Hülfensberg (called Stuffenberg in the Middle Ages) is a 448 m high, heavily wooded mountain in the Geismar municipality in the Eichsfeld district, Thuringia, Germany. The mountain has been a pilgrimage site since the late Middle Ages, and on its summit are a church containing a 12th-century crucifix, a Franciscan friary, a chapel dedicated to Saint Boniface, and a large free-standing cross.

The medieval name for the mountain was Stuffenberg, from which the supposed Germanic god Stuffo derives his name. According to some sources the name was changed in the 14th century (or around 1400) because of a famous crucifix in the church, the Hülfenskreuz; another etymology for the modern name was given in 1575, based on the legend that Boniface had defeated an army of unbelievers on the mountain, which was subsequently named Hülfensberg (helfen: to help) in reference to divine help.

== Pilgrimage ==
The Hülfensberg has been a pilgrimage site since the late Middle Ages, and at one point was one of the seven most popular such sites in Germany; the goal of these pilgrimages was a 12th-century crucifix. Today pilgrimages occur throughout the year. During the East-West division of Germany, the Hülfensberg was less than a kilometer from the border, on the eastern side, meaning that opportunities for pilgrimage were restricted to a small number of people. According to Father Heribert (one of the Franciscan friars, 2010), attendance dropped by two-thirds in 1953, the year after the Hülfensberg was placed inside the expanded and protected border area. Permission for visits to the mountain was usually only granted to locals; all others interested in pilgrimage had to request permission, and half were denied. As of 2010, some 250 pilgrims attend Sunday mass in the church, and 1000 to 2000 people participate in each of the four major pilgrimages per year.

== Hülfenskreuz ==
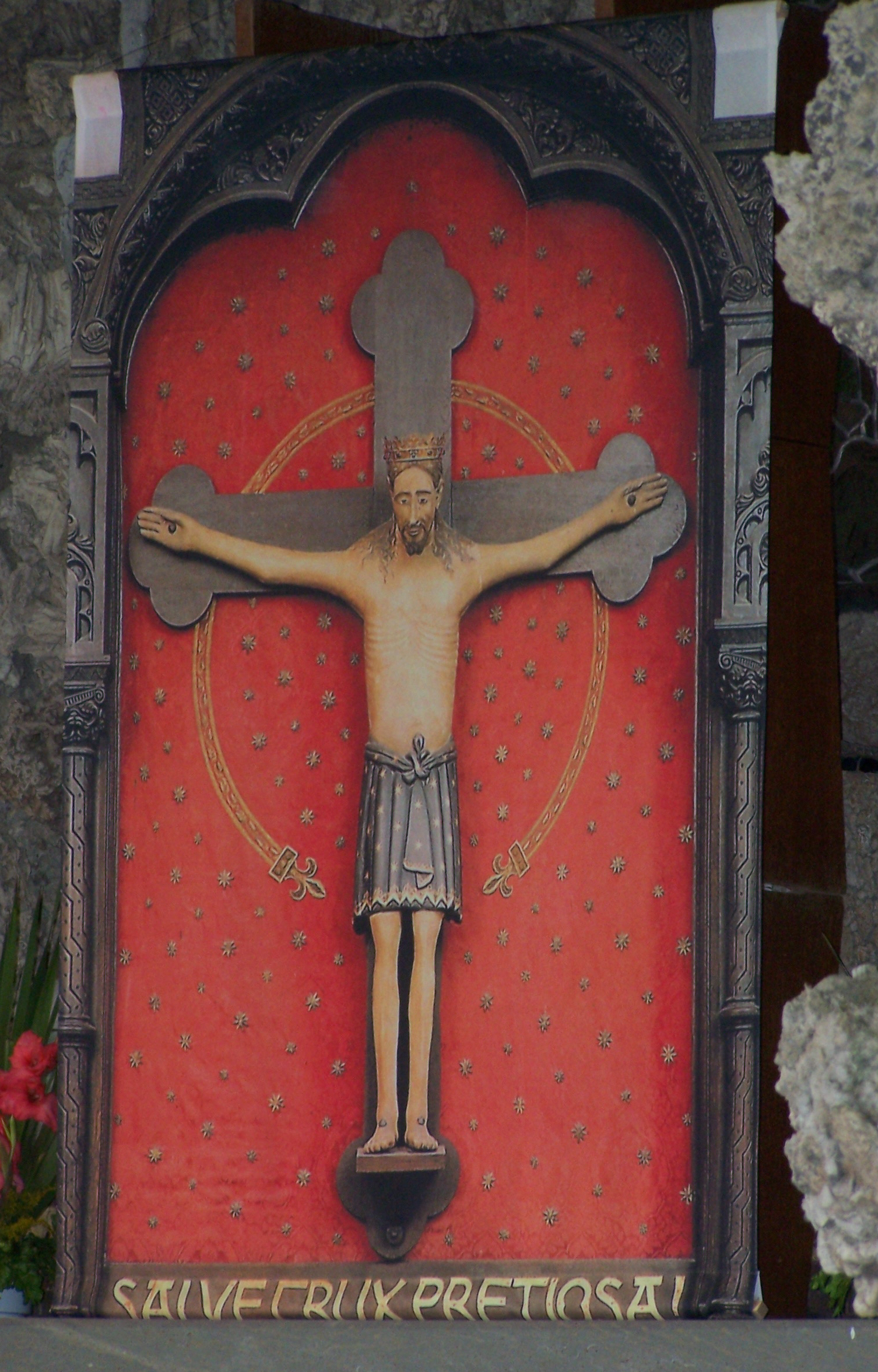
The Hülfenskreuz

The focal point of pilgrimage on the Hülfensberg is the Hülfenskreuz, a 12th-century Romanesque crucifix. It is one of the most popular pieces of sacral art in the Erfurt diocese as well as one of the most important.

The wooden sculpture is of Christ as a king looking straight ahead (in a "strong frontality"), wearing a crown. A renovation in 1850 reconnected the legs with the cross. While the 12th-century origin of the cross is oft-repeated, Georg Dehio's Handbuch der deutschen kunstdenkmäler states that it may well be a later imitation.

The crucifix is placed on a red background covered with gold stars. The frame bears a motto in Latin, Salve Crux Pretiosa (Hail, precious cross). According to the local Franciscans, occasionally miracles happen on the site.

== St. Salvator church ==
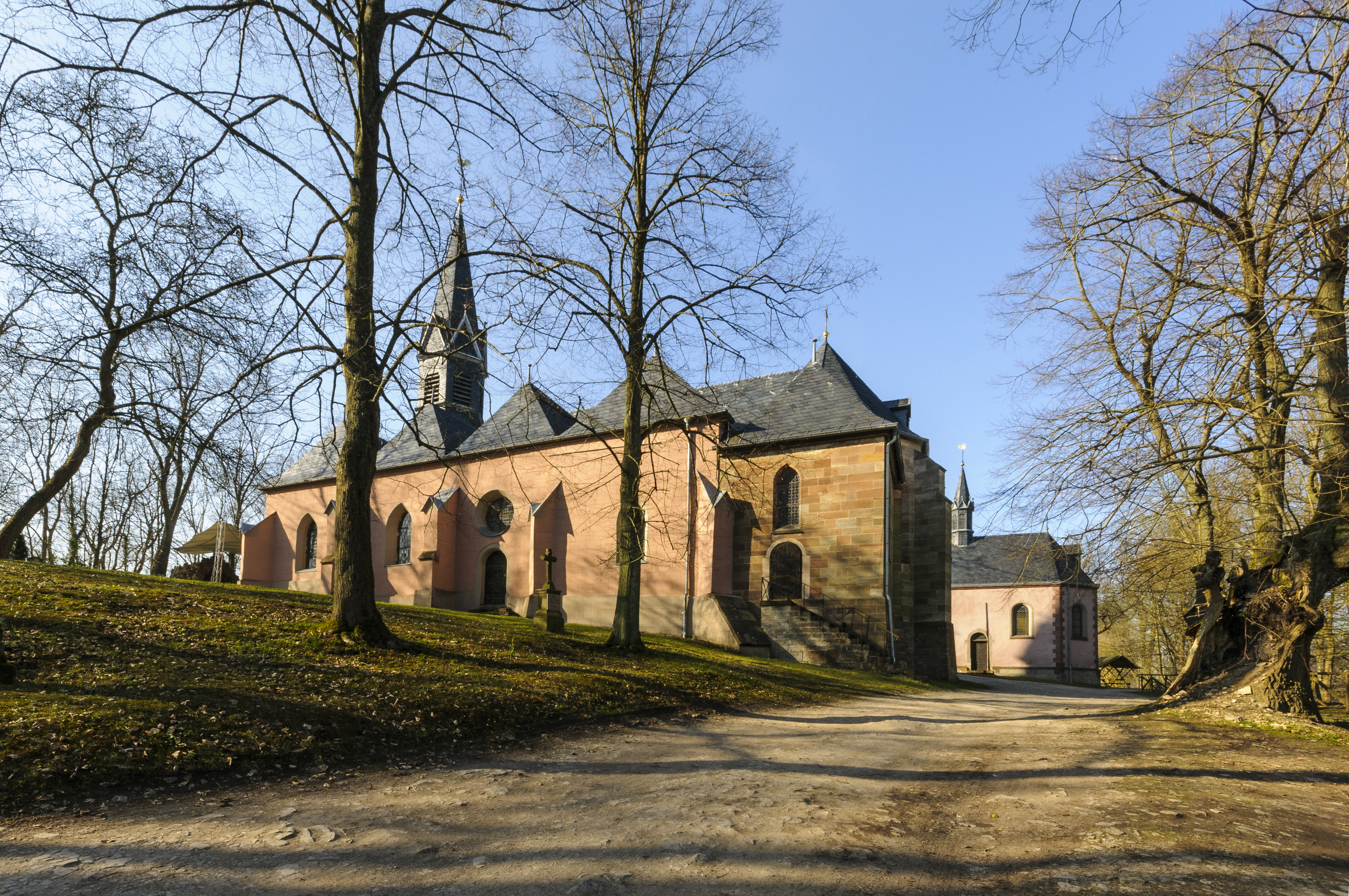
St. Salvator pilgrimage church

On top of the Hülfensberg is the St. Salvator church, which was built circa 1360–1367 as a sanctuary, on the remains of an older church (on the south side of the current church, next to the sacristy), dated circa 1000.

The oldest document pertaining to the Hülfensberg is a papal deed from 1351, which names the parish St. Salvator auf dem Stuffenberg. A later deed naming the location is dated 30 May 1352; at this time the Hülfensberg belonged to the St. Martin monastery in Heilbad Heiligenstadt, which in turn handed over the patronage to the Cistercian monastery of Anrode in 1357. Pilgrimages to the Hülfenskreuz, found at the church's Gnadenaltar, started from Anrode.

In 1583 the area and its church were transferred to the Archbishopric of Mainz, and remained Catholic during the Protestant Reformation. In the course of time, the St. Salvator church was expanded and renovated a number of times, most notably during the Baroque era. In 1810, the Anrode monastery was dissolved by Jérôme Bonaparte and sold, with all its possessions, to Franz Just Wedemeyer, of the Wedemeyer family, making the Hülfensberg private property. Eleven years later, Wedemeyer gave the top of the mountain, with its church, to the bishop. In 1890, the church was again expanded, in a neo-Gothic style, by Franciscan architect Paschalis Gratze. The original Boniface chapel, adjacent to the church, was torn down and rebuilt on a different location; the foundation of the old chapel was the base for the new apse, with altar and choir. In 1984, while the church was located in East-Germany, the roof on a church tower was renovated with materials paid for in West-German money through Genex, the East-German commercial exchange.

== Boniface chapel ==
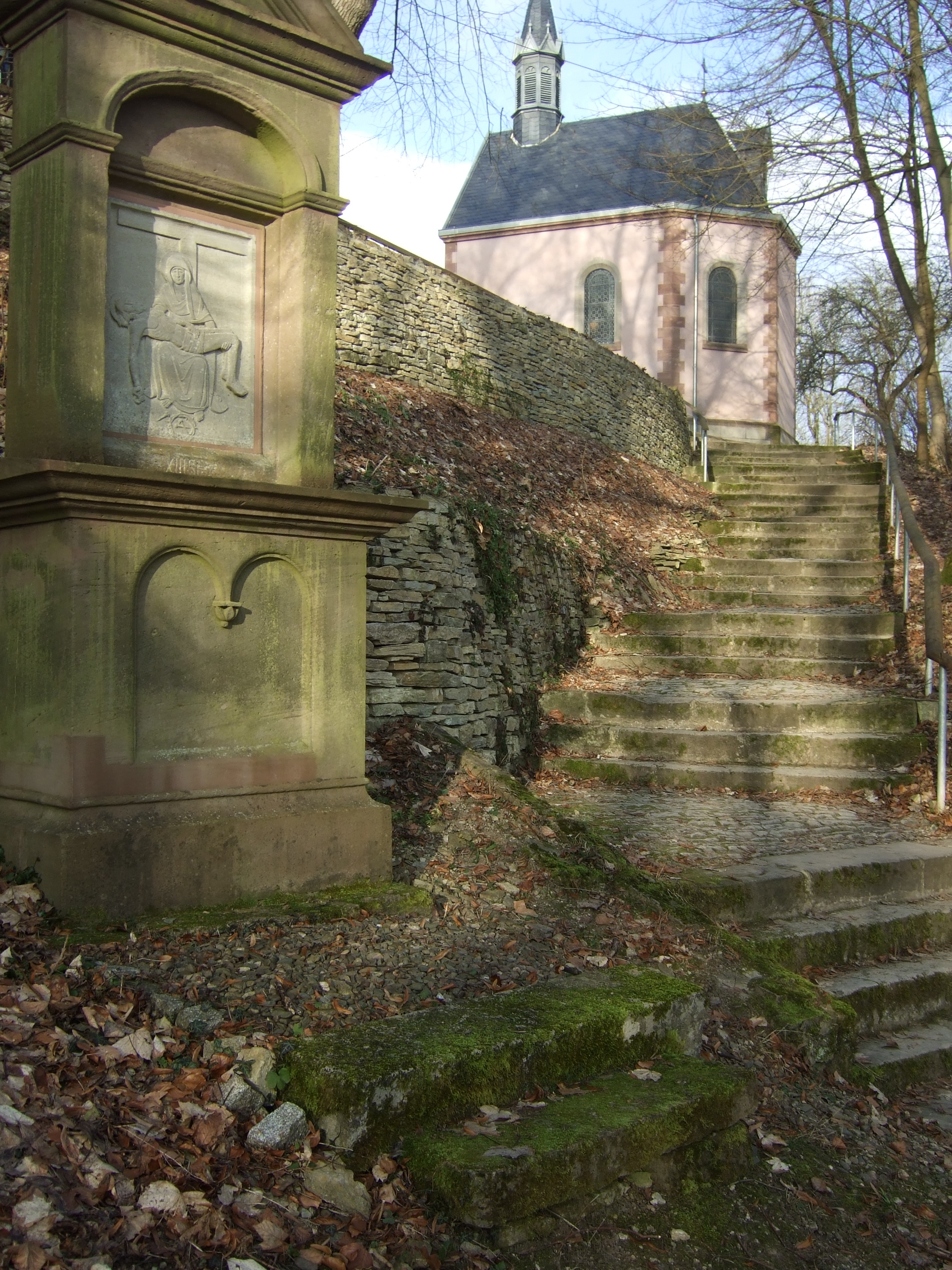
Boniface chapel

Next to the church is a chapel dedicated to Saint Boniface, built in 1903 on the foundations of an earlier chapel. According to local legend, this is where Boniface cut down a Donar Oak, a sacred, pagan tree, in the early 8th century. This legend is based on the proximity of the village Geismar, a place mentioned in the Boniface vitae—but, scholars agree now, this is in reference to another Geismar, now a part of Fritzlar in northern Hesse.

Another legend says that Boniface stood on the top of the Hülfensberg and said, Wann wird endlich Frieden schweben über dieser schönen Aue ("when will peace at last hover over this lovely forest?"). Folk etymology derived from his supposed words the local place names Wanfried, Frieda (in Meinhard), Schwebda (likewise in Meinhard), and Aue (in Wanfried).

== Franciscan monastery ==
Franciscans founded a monastery (the oldest in the Eichsfeld area), also named Hülfensberg, on top of the mountain; on 16 April 1860, two priests and two lay brothers dedicated the monastery—originally, these were to found a new sanctuary at Klüschen Hagis, with the Hülfensberg being nothing but a provisional church.

During the Kulturkampf, the monastery was forced to close for twelve years. When in May 1952 the East-German government strengthened the nearby border and its Sperrzone (which placed the Hülfensberg inside the protected zone), the monastery and the church suffered a steep drop in attendance.

As of 2011, four Franciscans live in the monastery, which belongs to the German Franciscan province of St. Elisabeth, whose seat is in Munich.

== Dr. Konrad Martin Kreuz ==
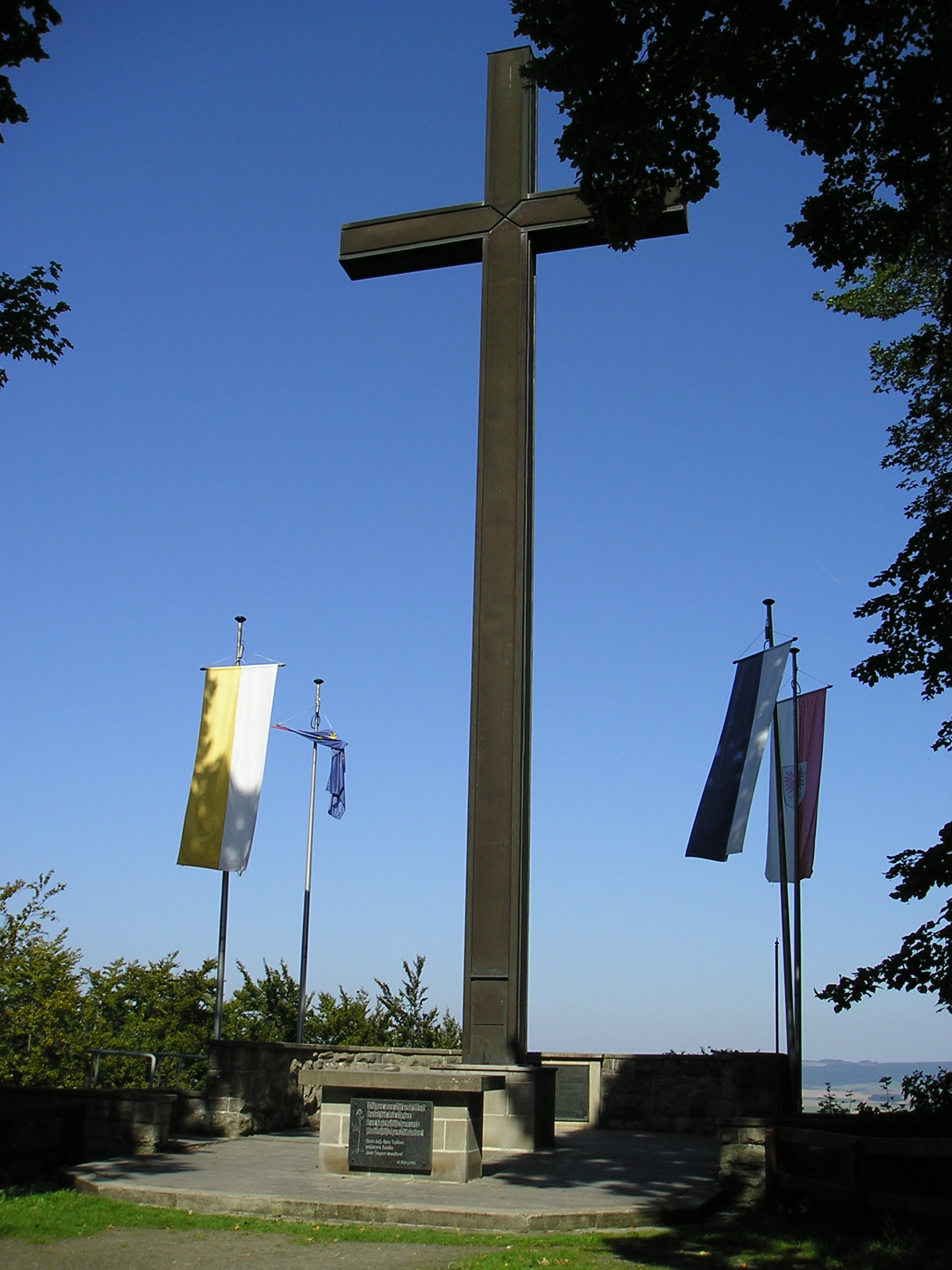
Dr. Konrad Martin Kreuz

Konrad Martin, Bishop of Paderborn from 1856 to 1875, was born in nearby Geismar. In his honor, a steel cross was erected on top of the Hülfensberg and dedicated on 7 August 1933. The cross is 18.60 m (61.0 ft) tall. It was taken down in 1990, restored and put back up in May 1991. In March 1990, after the Unification of Germany, a plaque was dedicated at the foot of the cross to remember the "victims of the fascist and stalinist dictatorship".
