= Wanfried =

- Town
- Coat of arms

- Location of Wanfried within Werra-Meißner-Kreis district
- Interactive map of Wanfried
- Location within Germany Location within Hesse
- Coordinates: 51°11′N 10°10′E
- Country: Germany
- State: Hesse
- Admin. region: Kassel
- District: Werra-Meißner-Kreis
- Subdivisions: 5 districts

Government
  - Mayor (2019–25): Wilhelm Gebhard (CDU)

Area
  - Total: 46.88 km^{2} (18.10 sq mi)
- Elevation: 190 m (620 ft)

Population (2025-12-31)
  - Total: 4,039
  - Density: 86.16/km^{2} (223.1/sq mi)
- Time zone: UTC+01:00 (CET)
  - Summer (DST): UTC+02:00 (CEST)
- Postal codes: 37281
- Dialling codes: 05655
- Vehicle registration: ESW
- Website: www.wanfried.de

Wanfried (German pronunciation: [ˈvanfʁiːt]) is a town in the Werra-Meißner-Kreis in northeasternmost Hesse, Germany. It is classified as a Landstadt, a designation given in Germany to a municipality that is officially a town (Stadt), but whose population is below 5,000. It literally means “country town”.

== Geography ==
=== Location ===
The town lies right on the boundary with Thuringia. It is found in the Werra valley northeast of the Schlierbachswald (range). Northeast of Wanfried, beyond the Thuringian boundary, is the neighbouring Eichsfeld-Hainich-Werratal Nature Park.

The Hessian middle centre of Eschwege lies only some 11 km downstream to the west. Other nearby towns of its kind are Mühlhausen (some 25 km to the east) and Eisenach (some 28 km to the southeast), both of which lie in Thuringia.

=== Neighbouring communities ===
Wanfried borders in the north on the community of Geismar, and more particularly on its constituent community of Döringsdorf (in Thuringia’s Eichsfeld district), in the east on the communities of Hildebrandshausen and Katharinenberg (both in Thuringia’s Unstrut-Hainich-Kreis), in the southeast and the south on the town of Treffurt (in Thuringia’s Wartburgkreis) and in the west on the town of Eschwege and the community of Meinhard, and more particularly on its constituent community of Frieda (both in the Werra-Meißner-Kreis).

=== Constituent communities ===
Wanfried’s Stadtteile are Wanfried (main town), Altenburschla, Aue, Heldra and Völkershausen.

== History ==
Wanfried is an ancient town. When Saint Boniface came to this area, it was already here. There were even already Christians here. He built the first churches. Even on the Hülfensberg he built a church and a monastery. While gazing from the Hülfensberg, Saint Boniface supposedly said, according to legend, “Wann wird endlich Frieden schweben über dieser schönen Aue?” (“When will peace at last hover over this lovely floodplain?). Folk etymology holds that this yielded the local placenames Wanfried, Frieda, Schwebda and Aue.

As a place in a border area, Wanfried, which had already been mentioned by 813 under the names In wanen In Riden and Uuanenreodum, was often the object of territorial swaps and pledges by both the Hessian and Thuringian Landgraves, whose spheres of interest came up against each other here. After the Battle of Wettin (1264), the community mentioned at this time as Wenefridun was ceded to Thuringia. To expand his new Hessian Landgraviate, Henry I bought the communities of Wanfried and Frieda and a few villages in the Eichsfeld from the Thuringian Landgrave in 1306. A few years later, with and assault by Hermann II of Treffurt, began the violent disputes over Wanfried’s ownership. Hermann managed to take the place in a surprise attack; however, he could not keep it in the long run. In 1336, Hermann’s castle, Normannstein was taken by a coalition of Hessian, Electoral Mainz and Saxonian troops. After the booty had been shared out among the victors, the Hessian Landgrave Otto I sought to link the new, isolated properties to his territory by a territorial corridor. To this end, he acquired in 1365 from the Lords at Völkershausen their court rights over the villages of Altenburschla, Döringsdorf, Heldra, Helderbach, Rambach and Weißenborn. Before Wanfried passed for good to the Hessian Landgraves, there were once again conflicts with neighbouring Thuringia in the course of the Sternerkrieg (war), in the late 14th century.

Wanfried was raised to town on 30 August 1608 through Hessian Landgrave Moritz’s privilege, and was granted market rights, too.

In 1616, the town of Wanfried was named in the Verzeichnis der fürnembsten Städte Europas (“Directory of Europe’s Finest Cities”) as an important trading centre. As a starting point for shipping on the Werra, whose river system had been secured by locks at Eschwege and Allendorf, the town grew into a trading centre in which wares of all kinds were traded. After the goods had cleared the Auf der Schlagd customs office, they were consigned to the town's warehouses, shortly thereafter to be shipped out again overland. The shippers brought mostly goods from the coastal cities bound especially for Thuringia and Bavaria, important destinations there being the trading centres of Leipzig and Nuremberg.

In the Thirty Years' War, the town was sacked by Tilly's troops on 25 June 1626. In 1627, Wanfried belonged to the domain of the Rotenburger Quart and as of 1667 was residence of the Catholic sideline of Hesse-Wanfried. In 1667, Landgrave Karl moved into the palace here as founder of the line. Karl's sons, Wilhelm and Christian, ruled here until their line died out in 1755. In accordance with the house agreement, the Landgraviate of Hesse-Wanfried then passed back to Hesse-Rotenburg. In 1834, Hesse-Rotenburg itself passed back to the main line of Hesse-Kassel.

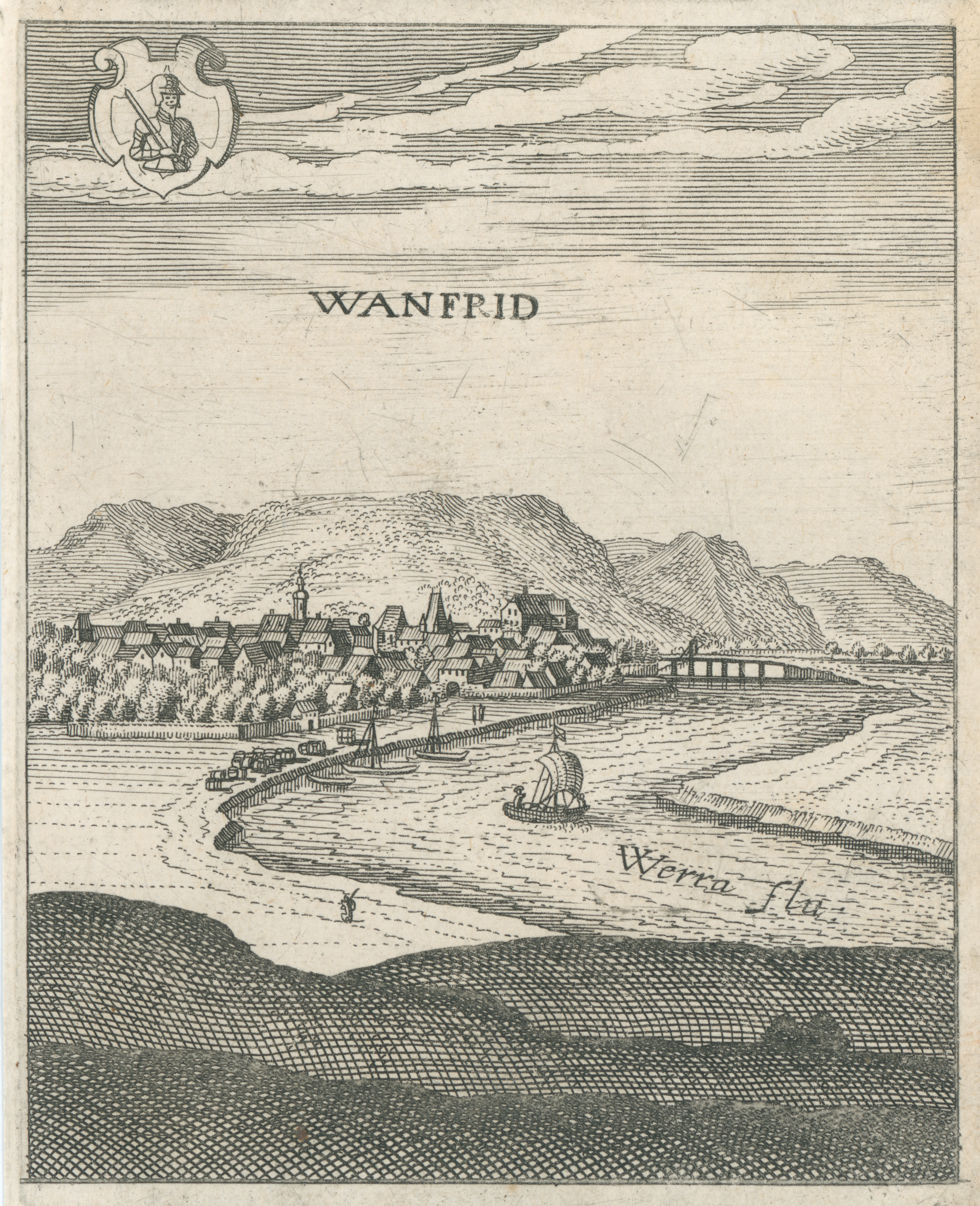
Wanfried – extract from the Topographia Hassiae by Matthäus Merian 1655

Wanfried's former importance as an entrepôt is confirmed by a trader's balance sheet from the time about the end of the 16th century and beginning of the 17th. At this time, goods shipped out amounted to 80,000 hundredweight yearly, and the turnover came in at 132,000 hundredweight. Preferred goods were coffee, sugar, oil, spices, tobacco, woollen goods, wine, honey and fish. It was at this time that the stately trade houses arose on the market street, great townsmen's houses, inns, hostels, a stock exchange and a brewery. In the latter half of the 19th century, shipping on the Werra shrank ever more in importance as inland goods transport shifted to the railways. Wanfried was linked to the rail network in 1902 by the Werratalbahn.

In the 19th century, the trading town of Wanfried saw a boom in its wealth. The walls and towers were razed and the old town hall was torn down. The town's former glamour has been outlasted by the stately timber-frame houses, which form an almost unbroken set.

The inhabitants have been overwhelmingly Protestant since the Reformation. The small Catholic parish (founded in 1908) grew greatly after the Second World War from all the Ethnic German refugees from Eastern Europe .

The time from March through June 1945 in nazi-administered and American liberated Wanfried is described by Agnes Humbert from her viewpoint as a former French political prisoner and badly mistreated slave-labourer in her diary Notre guerre, souvenirs de Resistance (Résistance, Memoirs of Occupied France).

In 1945, at the Wanfried lordly seat, the Kalkhof, the Wanfried agreement, a territorial swap between the American and Soviet zones of occupation along the so-called Whisky-Vodka Line (a local railway, not the border), was signed.

Under the pseudonym “Friedheim”, the small town on the zonal border cropped up in producer Niklaus Schilling's feature films The Willi Busch Report and Border Frenzy, produced respectively a few years before and in the year after German reunification. Wanfried – or Friedheim – stood for a very quiet place about which not much was ever heard, but into which a local newspaper editor sought to bring some life by himself secretly initiating incidents on the border so that he could then report them in his paper.

The town of Wanfried celebrated its 400-year jubilee of the granting of town rights in 2008.

== Politics ==
=== Town council ===
The municipal election held on 26 March 2006 yielded the following results:

Parties and voter communities		% 2006	Seats; 2006	% 2001	Seats; 2001
CDU	Christian Democratic Union of Germany	44.7	10	40.8	9
SPD	Social Democratic Party of Germany	50.0	12	59.2	14
FDP	Free Democratic Party	5.3	1	–	–
Total		100.0	23	100.0	23
Voter turnout in %		65.5		66.4	

Heading the town council is Frank Susebach (SPD).

=== Mayors ===
Since October 2007, Wilhelm Gebhard (CDU) has been the mayor. He beat his opponent, Otto Frank (SPD), who held office from 1989 to 2007, with 51.7% of the vote.

Unopposed, he was re-elected in 2013, gaining 92.52%. The turnout was 55.35%.

He was re-elected in May 2019. This time he got 82.68%, while a rival candidate got 17.32%. The turnout was 69.89%.

=== Coat of arms ===
The town's arms might be described thus: Gules a bordure argent surmounted by the bust of a knight armoured proper.

Even the oldest known seal, from 1578, showed the knight. It could be a rendering of Roland, which was put in the arms as a sign of the lawcourt. It is also conceivable that the arms are canting with the knight standing as a peacekeeper in this former, once constantly contested bordertown. Wahr’ ’n Fried would, after all, be a rather vernacular way of saying “Keep the peace” in German, and it does sound rather like “Wanfried”.

=== Town partnerships ===
- Plouescat, Finistère, France
- Schörfling am Attersee, Upper Austria, Austria

The outlying centre of Altenburschla has the following sister village:

- Villeneuve-les-Sablons, Oise, France

== Culture and sightseeing ==
=== Museums ===
- Wanfried local museum at the Keudellsches Schloss
- Documentation centre for German postwar history
- Village museum in the outlying centre of Heldra

=== Buildings ===
- Schlagd, old harbour on the Werra with timber-frame warehouses
- Keudellsches Schloss
- Wanfried Landgrave’s palace
- Historic Town Hall, built in the 17th century
- Harm'sches Haus from the time of river shipping
- Hotel "Zum Schwan", lavishly restored timber-frame house from 1690
- Old Post, former Thurn-und-Taxis postal house, built in 1751
- Aue lordly seat from 1576 and ruins of the Aue moated castle
- Ruins of an old fief house (in Völkershausen, Schlierbachswald)
- Hostel "Im Kleegarten" in Heldra, lavishly restored estate aus from the 17th century that has already won a number of prizes for monument protection

=== Natural monuments ===
- Plesse (479.6 m above sea level), mountain with 60 m-tall light limestone rock face and the "Plesseturm" (tower), near Wanfried
- Heldrastein (503.8 m above sea level; “King of the Werra valley”), mountain with 62 m-tall and 2 km-wide rock face and the "Turm der Einheit" (“Unity Tower”), near Treffurt
- Hülfensberg (448.2 m above sea level), richly wooded mountain and pilgrimage site near Geismar

=== Sport ===
- Schützenverein Wanfried 1568 (shooting club)
- VfL Wanfried; biggest sport club in Wanfried and second biggest club in the Werra-Meißner-Kreis
- Wanfried is the district’s team handball stronghold.

=== Leisure ===
- Outdoor swimming pool
- Playing field with skating complex

=== Regular events ===
- "Schmandfest" (smetana festival) every August
- "Volks-, Schützen-, und Heimatfest" (folk, shooting and local history festival) yearly on the second weekend in July
- Christmas market on the second Saturday in December
- "Strohbärenfest" (“Straw Bear Festival”) in Heldra (on Ash Wednesday)
- Jazz-Matinee; Kalkhof in early summer
- Wanfrieder Lesung (“reading”); in summer
- Soapbox derby; yearly towards the end of summer holidays
- "Weinfest"; yearly on the third Saturday in September
- "Mountainbike-Orientierungsfahrt"; yearly on the second Saturday in October

== Economy and infrastructure ==
=== Transport ===
Through Wanfried, which lies on the "Deutsche Fachwerkstraße" (“German Timber Frame Road”), run Bundesstraßen 250 and 249.

=== Education ===
The town has at its disposal one primary school (Gerhart-Hauptmann-Schule) and one integrated comprehensive school (Anne-Frank-Schule), which since the 2006-2007 schoolyear has been functioning as a branch school of the Anne-Frank-Schule in Eschwege.
