= Rheinfels Castle =

Castle in Germany

- Burg Rheinfels
- St. Goar
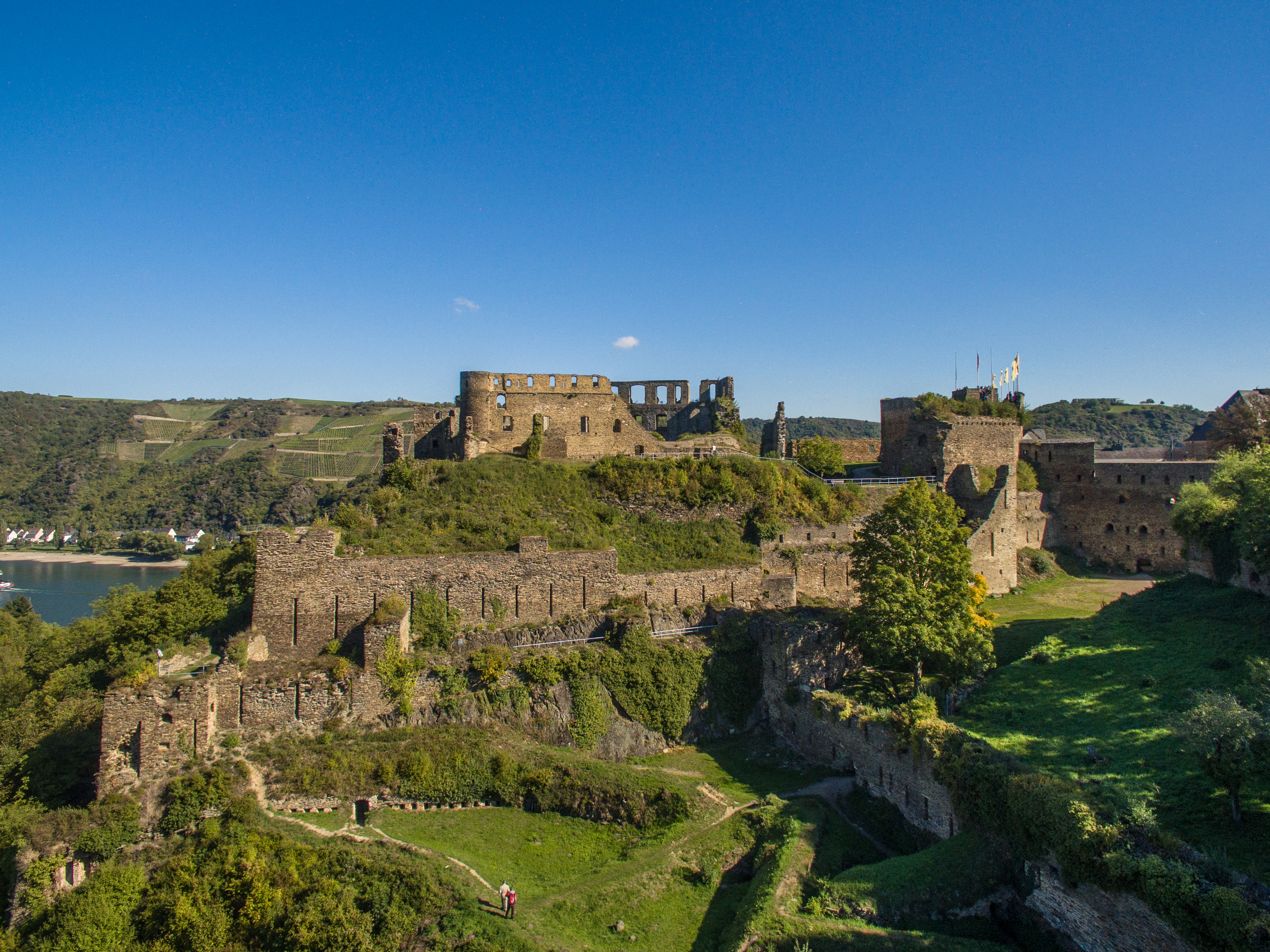
- Rheinfels Castle

Site information
- Type: Medieval castle
- Owner: Town of St. Goar
- Open to the public: yes
- Condition: ruin

Location
- Coordinates: 50°09′15″N 7°42′17″E

Site history
- Built: 1245
- Built for: Count Diether V of Katzenelnbogen

Rheinfels Castle (German: Burg Rheinfels) is a castle ruin located above the left (west) bank of the Rhine in Sankt Goar, Rhineland-Palatinate, Germany. It was started in 1245 by Count Diether V of Katzenelnbogen. After expansions, it was the largest fortress in the Middle Rhein Valley between Koblenz and Mainz. It was slighted by French Revolutionary Army troops in 1797. It is the largest castle overlooking the Rhine, and historically covered five times its current area.

While much of the castle is a ruin, some of the outer buildings are now a luxury hotel, wellness centre, and restaurant. There is also a museum within some of the better preserved structures.

== Description ==
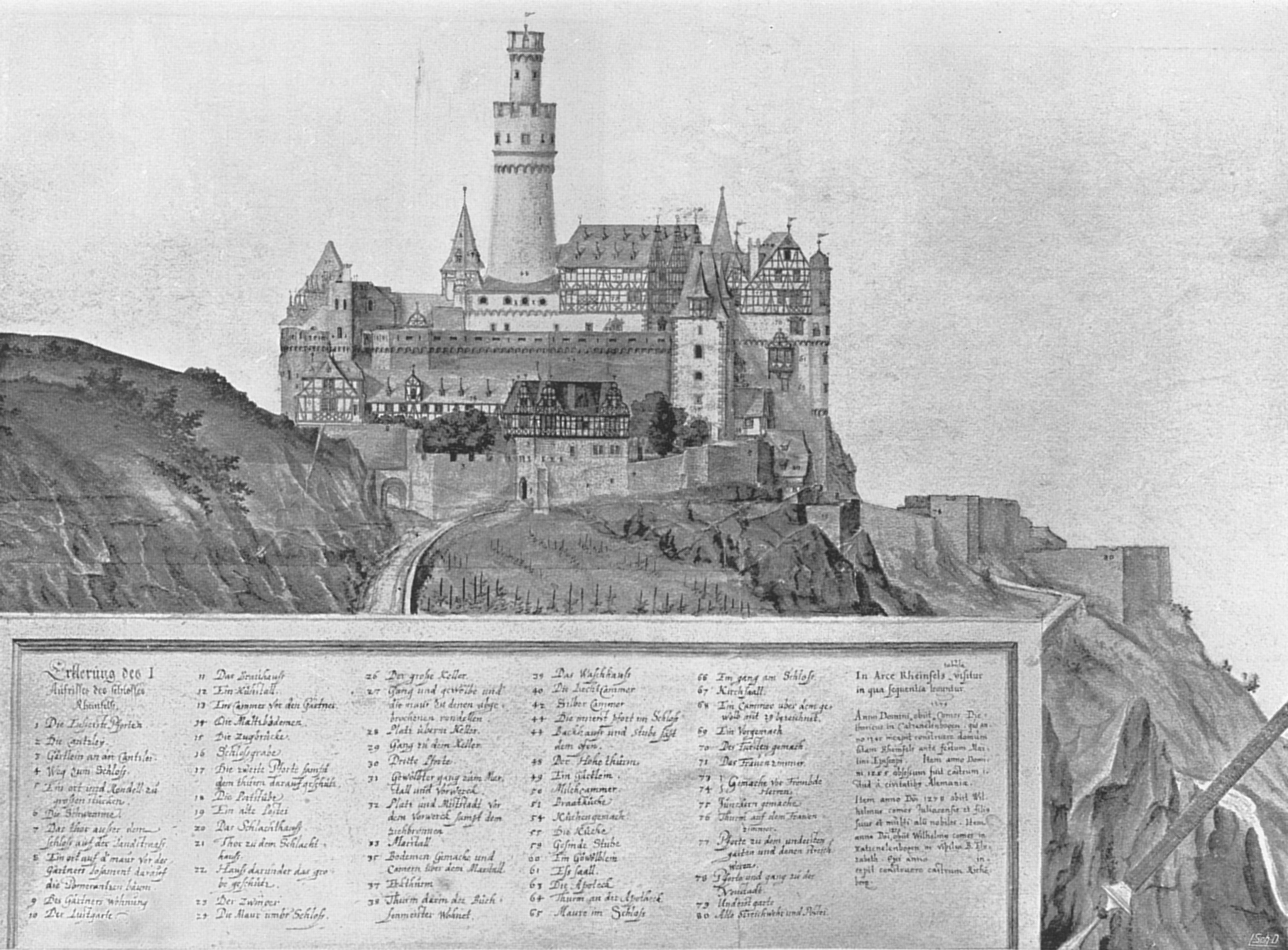
The castle as it appeared in 1607

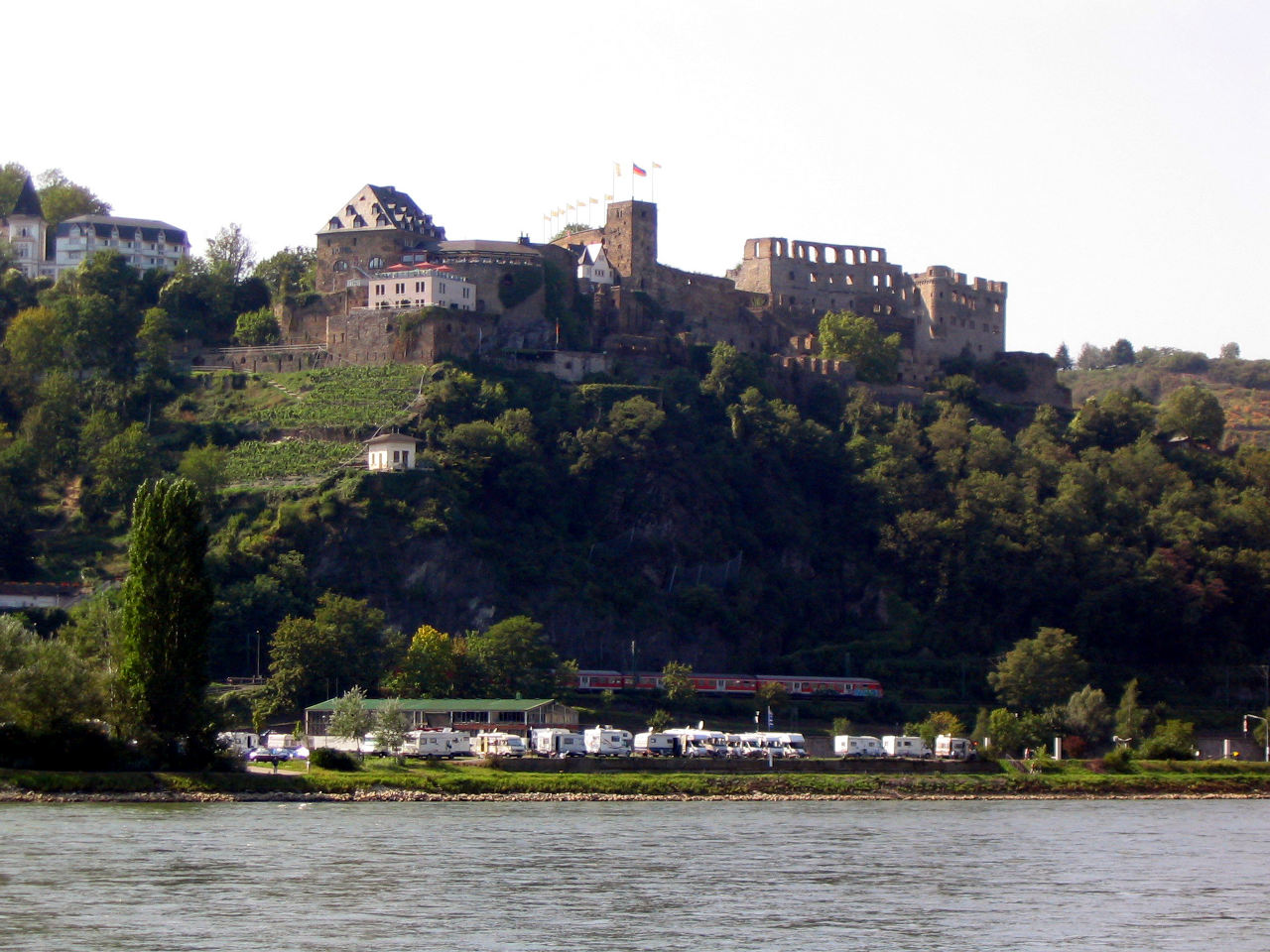
View of Rheinfels Castle from across the Rhein

The main entrance to the castle complex is a tall square clock or gate tower (~1300 AD) opposite the hotel. A connecting path joins the clock tower to the remains of the living quarters of the landgraves of Hesse-Darmstadt (the so-called Darmstadt Building). The Darmstadt building was designed in Tudor style with pointed gables. The connecting path was the site of the former moat of the main castle buildings; part of which is now the large cellar or basement. This large cellar was arched over in 1587–1589 in two visible phases. It is the largest self-supporting vaulted cellar in Europe and has a length of 24 metres (79 ft), a width and height of approximately 16 metres (52 ft) and can accommodate up to 400 people. The walls are up to 4 metres (13 ft) thick. Previously a 200,000 litres (53,000 US gal) wine barrel was constructed for storage. The cellar was renovated in 1997 and restored to its original condition and now serves as a meeting place for concerts, theater performances, and other shows. Next to the Darmstadt building once stood a 54 metres (177 ft) tall tower. It had a diameter of 10.5 metres (34 ft) with walls 3.5 metres (11 ft) thick at the bottom. In the 14th century, a narrow round tower was added to the top, making it the highest butter-churn tower in Germany.

The castle museum is located in the former castle chapel which is the only finished room of the original castle. It is accessed through an internal gate and up the path. The museum contains a model reconstruction of the castle before its destruction giving one a sense of how big the castle used to be. The medieval castle courtyard is found beyond the castle museum building (slightly uphill). This was the centre of the medieval castle which contained a bakery, pharmacy, garden, brewery, well, and livestock—which would have allowed it to withstand an extended siege. During peacetime, 300–600 people lived in the castle complex. During a siege, that number could swell to 4,500. Remnants of the original 13th-century plaster which was painted white can still be found on some walls.

== Hohenzollern claim ==
In June 2019, a claim made by Georg Friedrich, Prince of Prussia, that Rheinfels Castle be returned to the Hohenzollern family was dismissed by a court. In 1924, the ruined Castle had been given by the state of Rhineland-Palatinate to the town of St Goar, under the proviso it was not sold. In 1998 the town leased the ruins to a nearby hotel. His case made the claim that this constituted a breach of the bequest. In January 2020, the Prince of Prussia reached an out-of-court settlement with the city. In the future, St. Goar will work closely with the non-profit Princess Kira of Prussia Foundation, which supports socially disadvantaged young people.
