= Prince Emanuele Filiberto, Duke of Aosta (1731–1735) =

Prince Emanuele Filiberto
- Duke of Aosta
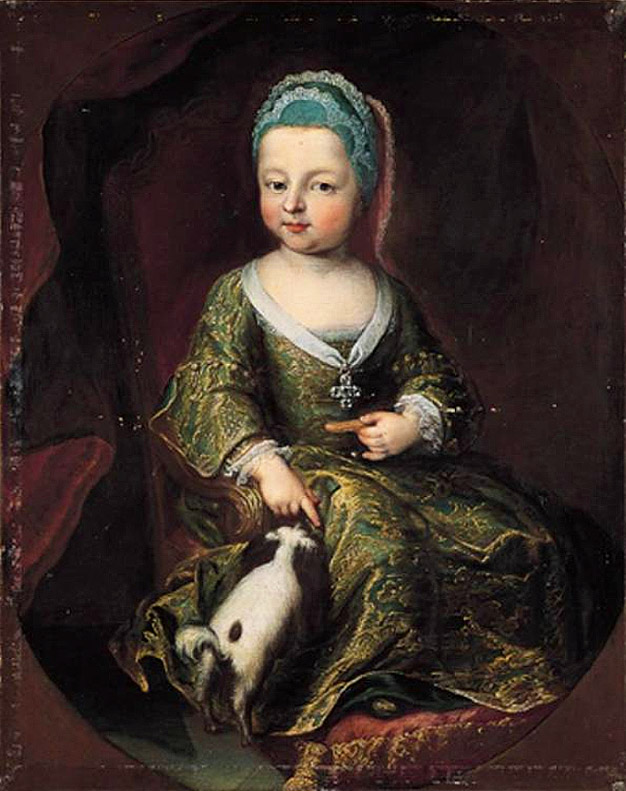
- Portrait of Emanuele Filiberto, probably by Maria Giovanna Clementi.
- Born: 17 May 1731; Royal Palace, Turin
- Died: 23 April 1735 (aged 3); Royal Palace, Turin
- Burial: Royal Basilica, Turin
Names
- Emanuele Filiberto di Savoia
- House: Savoy
- Father: Charles Emmanuel III of Sardinia
- Mother: Polyxena of Hesse-Rotenburg

Emanuele Filiberto, Duke of Aosta (17 May 1731 – 23 April 1735) was a prince of Savoy. He was born in the reign of his father Charles Emmanuel III, King of Sardinia.

== Biography ==
Prince Emanuele Filiberto was born at the Royal Palace of Turin, Turin. He was the second son of Charles Emmanuel III of Sardinia and his second wife Polyxena of Hesse-Rotenburg, and he was styled as the Duke of Aosta from birth until his death.

His maternal cousins included Victor Amadeus, Prince of Carignano and his younger sister the future princesse de Lamballe, both of whom were born at the court of Savoy. His paternal cousins included Ferdinand VI of Spain, who was king of Spain at the time of her birth.

Prince Emanuele died the 23 April 1735, at the age of 3.

== Ancestry ==
Ancestors of Prince Emanuele Filiberto, Duke of Aosta (1731–1735)

8. Charles Emmanuel I, Duke of Savoy
4. Victor Amadeus II of Sardinia
9. Marie Jeanne of Savoy
2. Charles Emmanuel III of Sardinia
10. Philippe de France, Duke of Orléans
5. Anne Marie d'Orléans
11. Henrietta of England
1. Prince Emanuele Filiberto of Savoy
12. William, Landgrave of Hesse-Rotenburg
6. Ernest Leopold, Landgrave of Hesse-Rotenburg
13. Maria Anna of Löwenstein-Wertheim-Rochefort
3. Polyxena of Hesse-Rotenburg
14. Maximilian Charles Albert of Löwenstein-Wertheim
7. Eleonore of Löwenstein-Wertheim-Rochefort
15. Maria Polyxena Khuen-Belasi-Lichtenberg
