= Princess Eleonora of Savoy =

Member of the House of Savoy (1728–1781)

Eleonora of Savoy
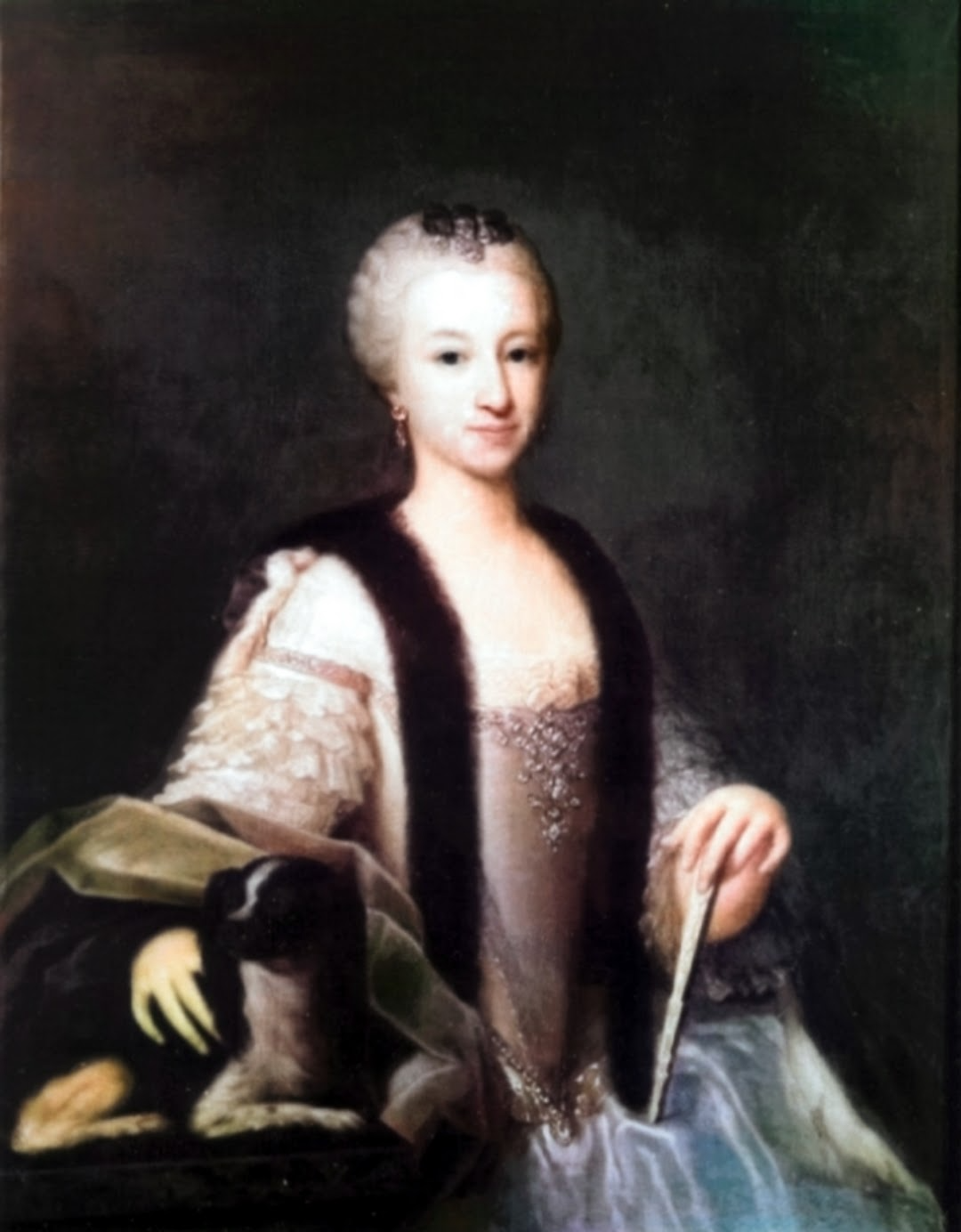
- Portrait of Eleanor Maria Theresa of Savoy, made between 1740~1760, by Domenico Duprà
- Born: 28 February 1728; Royal Palace of Turin, Turin
- Died: 14 August 1781 (aged 53); Castle of Moncalieri, Turin
- Burial: Royal Basilica of Superga, Turin
Names
- Eleonora Maria Teresa di Savoia
- House: Savoy
- Father: Charles Emmanuel III
- Mother: Polyxena of Hesse-Rotenburg

Eleonora Maria Teresa of Savoy (28 February 1728 – 14 August 1781) was a Savoyard princess, the eldest daughter of Charles Emmanuel III of Sardinia and his second wife Polyxena of Hesse-Rotenburg. She died unmarried.

== Biography ==
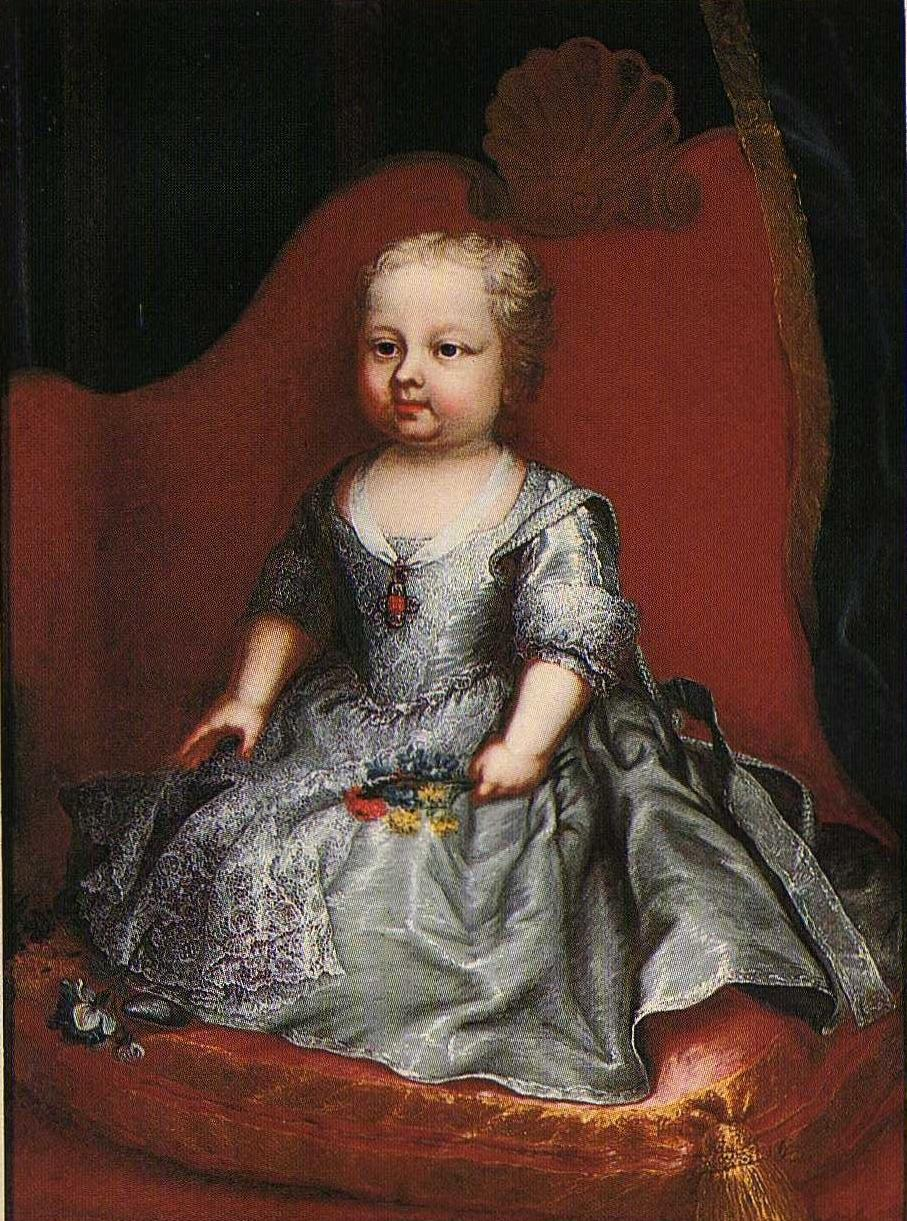
Princess Eleonora in 1731, by Maria Giovanna Clementi.

Eleonora Maria Teresa di Savoia was the second child and eldest daughter of Charles Emmanuel III, King of Sardinia and his second wife, the German Polyxena of the Landgraviate of Hesse-Rotenburg. She was born at the Royal Palace of Turin, the city residence of the Savoyard royal family.

She received the forename of her maternal grandmother, Eleonore of Löwenstein-Wertheim-Rochefort.

Her maternal cousins included Victor Amadeus II, Prince of Carignano and his younger sister the future princesse de Lamballe, both of which were born at the court of Savoy. Her paternal cousins included Ferdinand VI, who was king of Spain at the time of her birth.

She was born to a relatively happy marriage between her parents. Her paternal grandmother Anne Marie d'Orléans died in August 1728 when Eleonora was six months old.

Her mother died in 1735 when Eleonora was six. Thus she was the highest ranking female at the Savoyard court until the marriage of her brother, the future Victor Amadeus III to the Spanish Infanta Maria Antonietta in 1750.

Eleonora, and her sister Maria Luisa, were proposed as brides for Louis, Dauphin of France, eldest son of King Louis XV, who was their first cousin. The marriage never materialised due to marriage negotiations with the Spanish which led to the dauphin marrying Maria Teresa, an older sister of Maria Antonietta in 1744.

Her two nieces, Princesses Maria Giuseppina and Maria Teresa would later marry two sons of Louis, Dauphin of France in 1771 and 1773 respectively.

The spinster princess died at the Castle of Moncalieri, Turin at the age of 53. She was buried in the Royal Basilica of Superga overlooking Turin. Her sister in law Maria Antonietta died at Moncalieri in 1785.

== Ancestry ==
Ancestors of Princess Eleonora of Savoy

8. Charles Emmanuel I, Duke of Savoy
4. Victor Amadeus II of Sardinia
9. Marie Jeanne of Savoy
2. Charles Emmanuel III of Sardinia
10. Philippe I, Duke of Orléans
5. Anne Marie d'Orléans
11. Henrietta of England
1. Princess Eleonora Maria Teresa of Savoy
12. William, Landgrave of Hesse-Rotenburg
6. Ernest Leopold, Landgrave of Hesse-Rotenburg
13. Maria Anna of Löwenstein-Wertheim-Rochefort
3. Polyxena of Hesse-Rotenburg
14. Maximilian Charles Albert of Löwenstein-Wertheim
7. Eleonore of Löwenstein-Wertheim-Rochefort
15. Maria Polyxena Khuen-Belasi-Lichtenberg
