= Prince Vittorio Amedeo Teodoro, Duke of Aosta =

Vittorio Amedeo Theodore
- Duke of Aosta
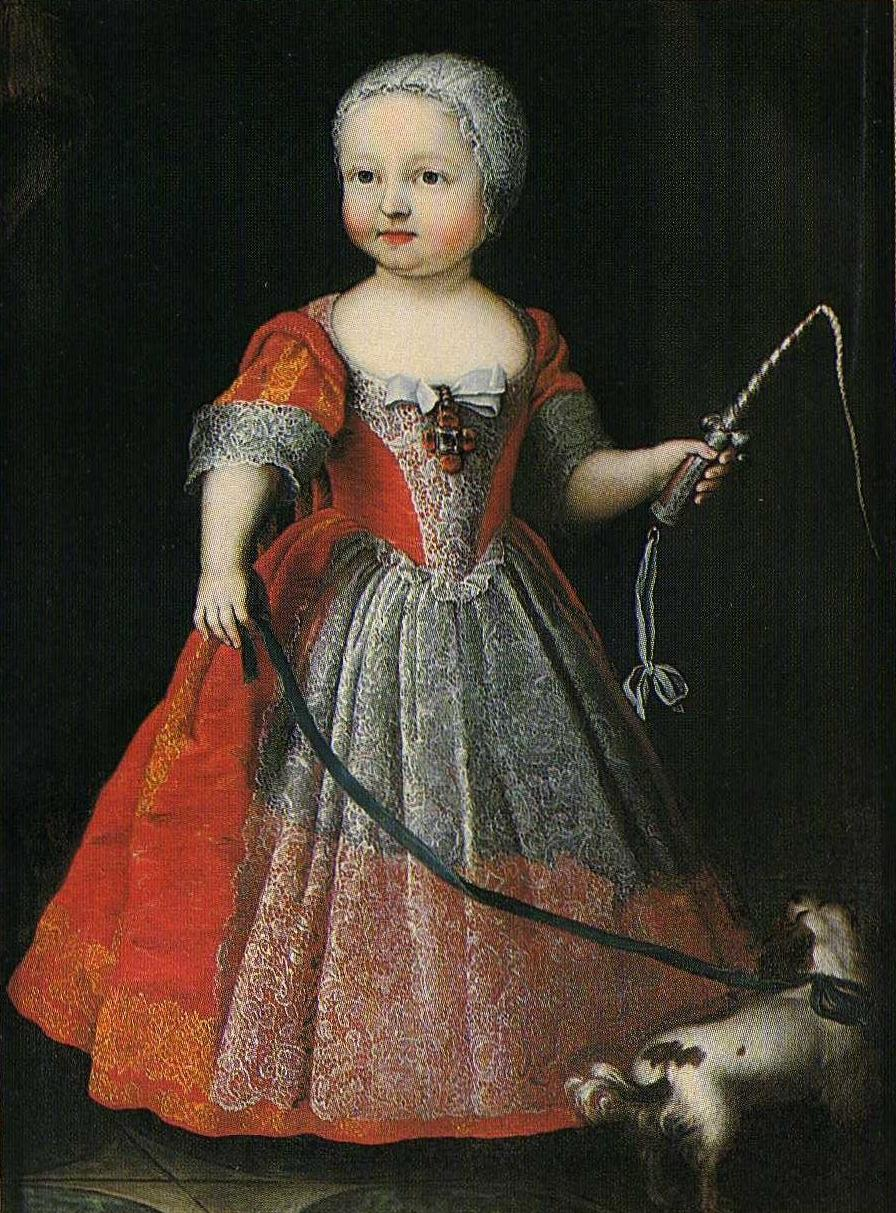
- Prince Vittorio Amedeo, by Maria Giovanna Clementi.
- Born: 7 March 1723; Royal Palace, Turin
- Died: 11 August 1725 (aged 2); Royal Palace, Turin
- Burial: Royal Basilica, Superga, Turin
Names
- Italian: Vittorio Amedeo Teodoro; English: Victor Amadeus Theodore
- House: Savoy
- Father: Charles Emmanuel, Prince of Piedmont (later Charles Emmanuel III)
- Mother: Anne Christine of Sulzbach

Vittorio Amedeo Theodore of Savoy (Prince Vittorio Amedeo Theodore; 7 March 1723 – 11 August 1725) was a prince of Savoy and Duke of Aosta. He was born in the reign of his grandfather Victor Amadeus II, King of Sardinia.

== Biography ==
Prince Vittorio Amedeo was born at the Royal Palace of Turin, he was a son of Charles Emmanuel III of Sardinia and his first wife Anne Christine of Sulzbach. He was styled as the Duke of Aosta from birth till his death. He was the first-born son of his parents and was second in line to the throne (after his father) from his birth, which was greeted with much celebration. He died on 11 August 1725, at the age of 2.

His father had another son with his second wife also named Victor Amadeus, Duke of Savoy, in his honour.
