= Princess Maria Felicita of Savoy =

Third daughter of Charles Emmanuel III, King of Sardinia (1730–1801)

Princess Maria Felicita
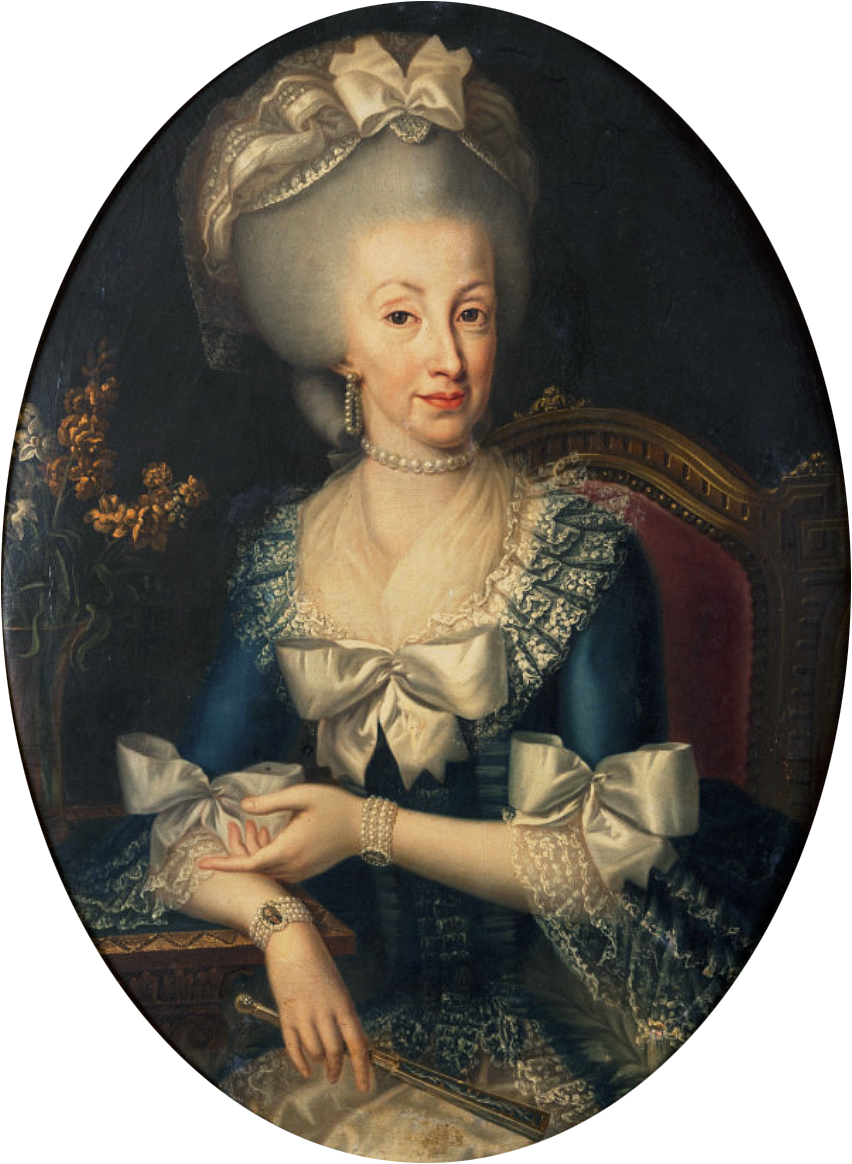
- Born: 19 March 1730; Royal Palace, Turin
- Died: 13 May 1801 (aged 71); Rome, Papal States
- Burial: Royal Basilica, Turin
Names
- Maria Felicita di Savoia
- House: Savoy
- Father: Charles Emmanuel III of Sardinia
- Mother: Polyxena of Hesse-Rotenburg

Princess Maria Felicita of Savoy (19 March 1730 – 13 May 1801) was a princess of the House of Savoy, the third daughter of Charles Emmanuel III of Sardinia and his second wife, Polyxena of Hesse-Rotenburg.

== Biography ==
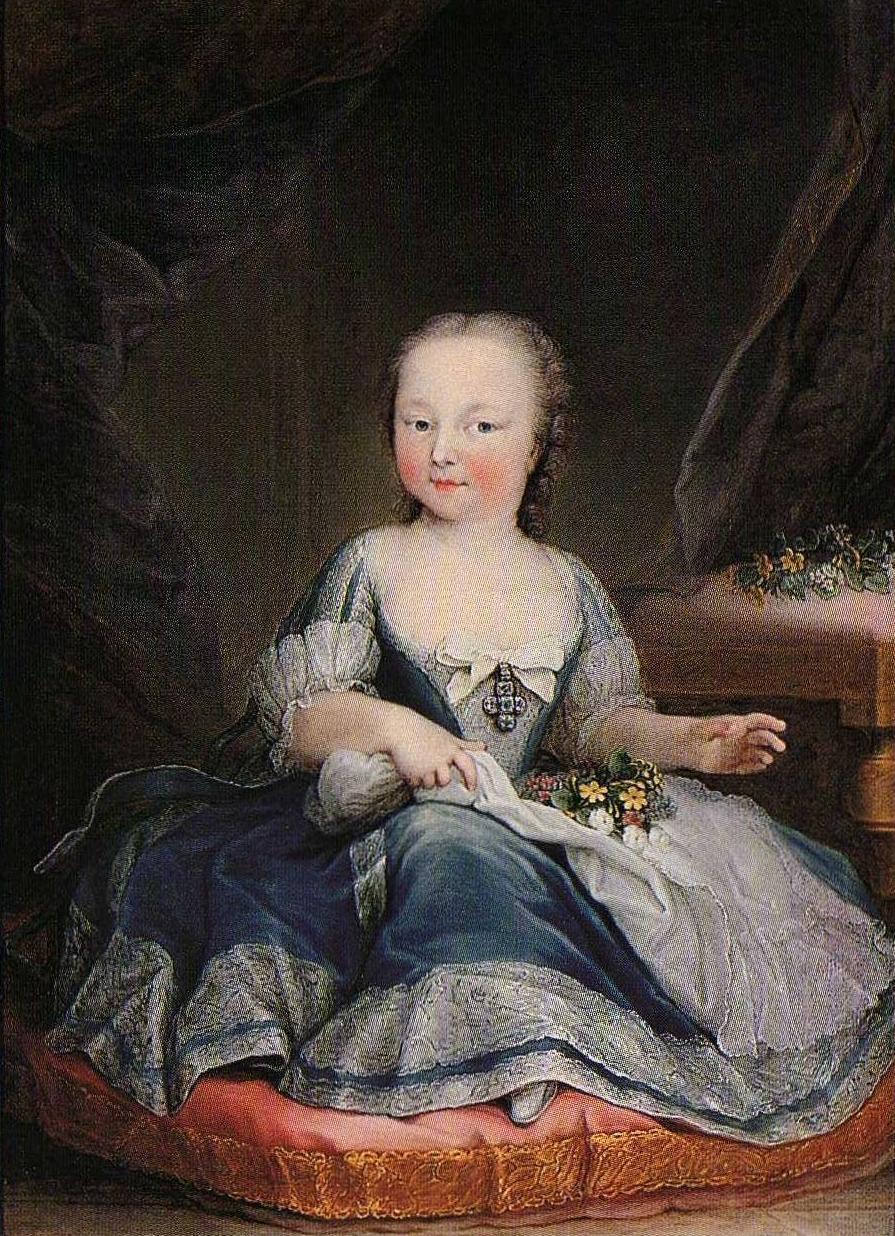
Princess Maria Felicita as an infant by unknown artist (probably Maria Giovanna Clementi), 1732.

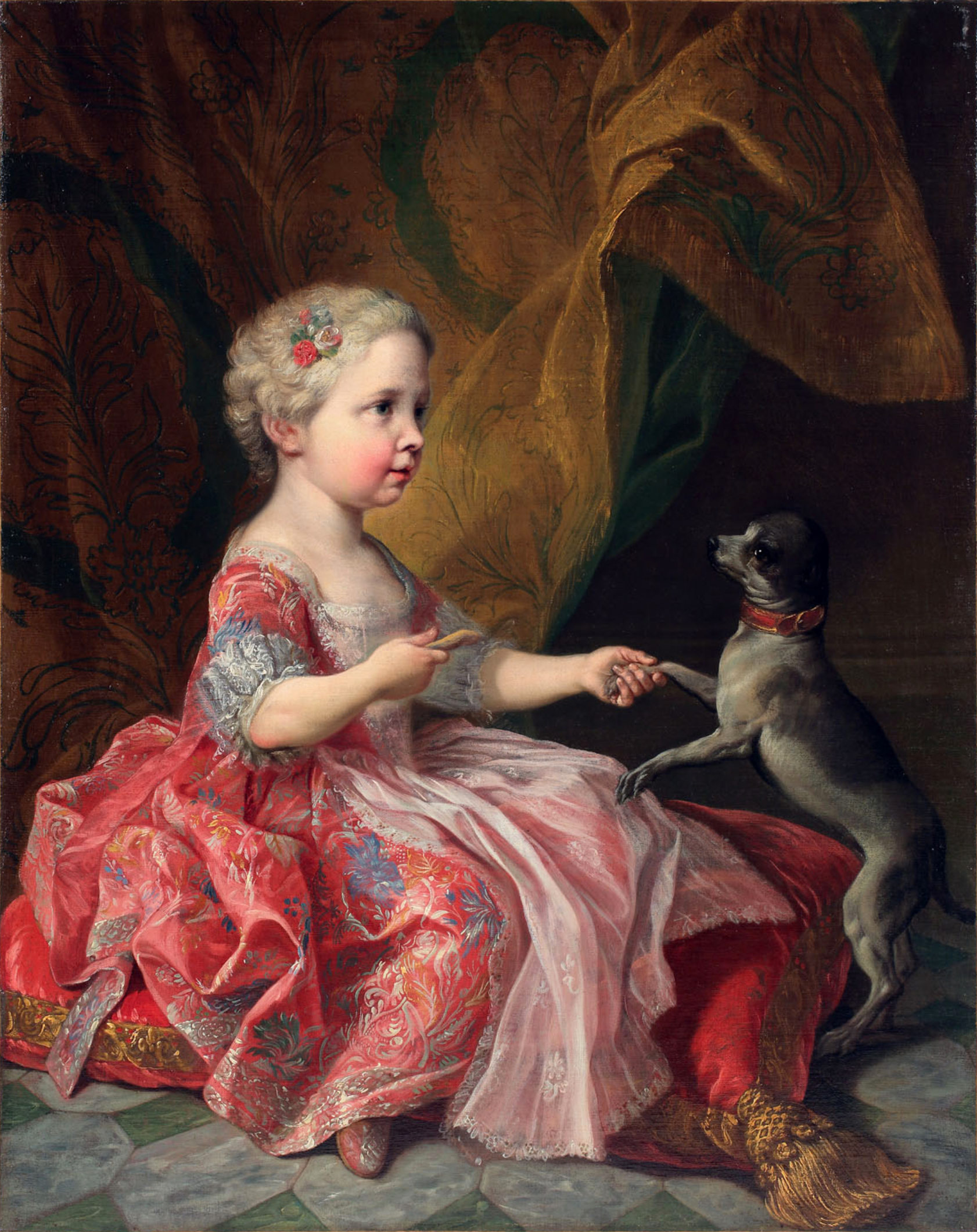
Maria Felicita by Louis-Michel van Loo.

Born at the Royal Palace of Turin, she was the third daughter of Charles Emmanuel III, King of Sardinia and his second wife Polyxena of Hesse-Rotenburg. Her mother died in 1735 when she was just four years old. Her father married again in 1737 to Elisabeth Therese of Lorraine, the youngest sister of Francis I, Holy Roman Emperor. Charles Emmanuel III and Elisabeth Therese went on to have three children, including the Duke of Chablais.

Her maternal cousins included Victor Amadeus, Prince of Carignan and his younger sister the future princesse de Lamballe, both of which were born at the court of Savoy. Her paternal cousins included Ferdinand VI of Spain, who was king of Spain at the time of her birth.

She never married. She was described as very religious. She founded, with Giovanni Battista Canaveri, a home in her native Turin for widows and destitute noble women "Convitto Principessa Maria Felicita di Savoia". Canaveri was the director. It was made possible due to an act she had her brother implement, Convitto per donne nubili e vedove, for women in the Kingdom of Sardinia.

On 6 December 1798, the French First Republic declared war on Sardinia.

Her nephew Charles Emmanuel (then king) was forced to abdicate all his territories on the Italian mainland and to withdraw to the island of Sardinia. As Charles Emmanuel took little interest in the rule of what was left of his kingdom, he and Clotilde lived in Rome and then in Naples as guests of the wealthy Colonna family. Maria Felicita went with her nephew to live as fugitives in Italy.

She died in Rome and was buried at the Royal Basilica of Superga overlooking Turin, the traditional burial place of the House of Savoy. She outlived all her siblings except the Duke of Chablais.

== Ancestry ==
Ancestors of Princess Maria Felicita of Savoy

8. Charles Emmanuel I, Duke of Savoy
4. Victor Amadeus II of Sardinia
9. Marie Jeanne of Savoy
2. Charles Emmanuel III of Sardinia
10. Philippe of France, Duke of Orléans
5. Anne Marie d'Orléans
11. Henrietta of England
1. Princess Maria Felicita of Savoy
12. William, Landgrave of Hesse-Rotenburg
6. Ernest Leopold, Landgrave of Hesse-Rotenburg
13. Maria Anna of Löwenstein-Wertheim-Rochefort
3. Polyxena of Hesse-Rotenburg
14. Maximilian Charles Albert of Löwenstein-Wertheim
7. Eleonore of Löwenstein-Wertheim-Rochefort
15. Maria Polyxena Khuen-Belasi-Lichtenberg
