= Prince Carlo Francesco, Duke of Aosta =

Prince Carlo Francesco
- Duke of Aosta
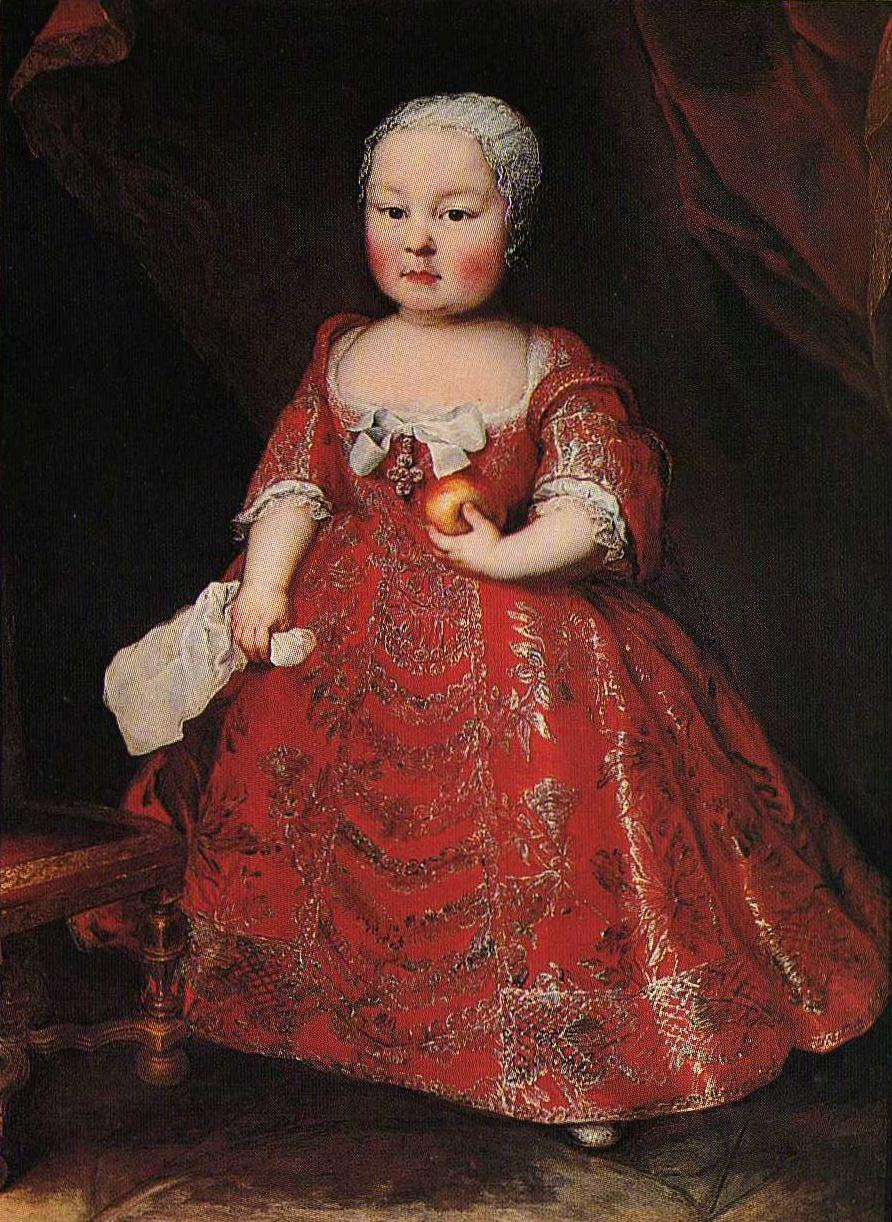
- Born: 1 December 1738; Palace of Venaria, Turin
- Died: 25 March 1745 (aged 6); Royal Palace, Turin
- Burial: Royal Basilica, Turin
Names
- Carlo Francesco Maria Augusto di Savoia
- House: Savoy
- Father: Charles Emmanuel III of Sardinia
- Mother: Elisabeth Therese of Lorraine

Carlo Francesco, Duke of Aosta (Carlo Francesco Maria Augusto; 1 December 1738 – 25 March 1745) was a prince of Savoy. He was born in the reign of his father Charles Emmanuel III, King of Sardinia.

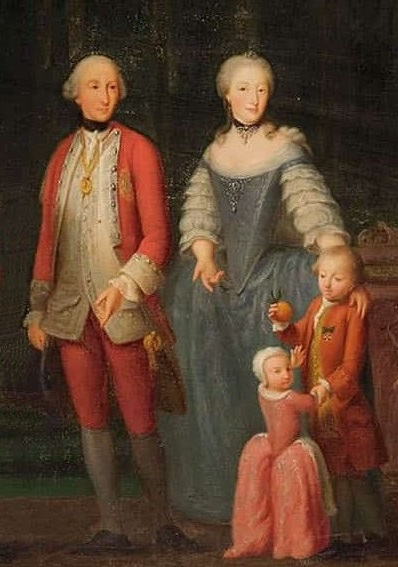
Posthumous portrait of Carlo Francesco, Duke of Aosta with his mother and two siblings..

== Biography ==
Prince Carlo was born at the Palace of Venaria, Turin. He was the first child of his father Charles Emmanuel III of Sardinia and Élisabeth Thérèse of Lorraine. His mother died giving birth to his brother Prince Benedetto, named after Pope Benedict XIV who became pope the year before his birth.

At the time of his birth, he was third in line to the Sardinian throne after his father and his oldest half brother Victor Amadeus, Duke of Savoy. His paternal cousins included Louis XV of France, the future Ferdinand VI of Spain, and the Prince of Carignan. His maternal cousin's included the future Queen of Naples and the famous Marie Antoinette.

He died in Turin aged 6, and was buried at Royal Basilica of Superga, Turin.

== Ancestry ==
Ancestors of Prince Carlo Francesco, Duke of Aosta

8. Charles Emmanuel I, Duke of Savoy
4. Victor Amadeus II of Sardinia
9. Princess Marie Jeanne of Savoy
2. Charles Emmanuel III of Sardinia
10. Philippe of France, Duke of Orléans
5. Anne Marie d'Orléans
11. Henrietta of England
1. Prince Carlo Francesco of Savoy, Duke of Aosta
12. Charles V, Duke of Lorraine
6. Leopold, Duke of Lorraine
13. Eleonor of Austria
3. Elisabeth Therese of Lorraine
14. Philippe of France, Duke of Orléans =10
7. Élisabeth Charlotte d'Orléans
15. Elizabeth Charlotte of the Palatinate
