= Princess Maria Luisa of Savoy =

Maria Luisa of Savoy may refer to:

- Maria Luisa of Savoy (1688–1714), daughter of Victor Amadeus II of Sardinia and Anne Marie d'Orléans; queen of Spain as first consort of Philip V of Spain
- Princess Maria Luisa of Savoy (1729–1767) (1729–1767), daughter of Charles Emmanuel III of Sardinia and Polyxena of Hesse-Rotenburg
