= Princess Maria Vittoria Margherita of Savoy =

Princess of Savoy (1740–1742)

Princess Maria Vittoria
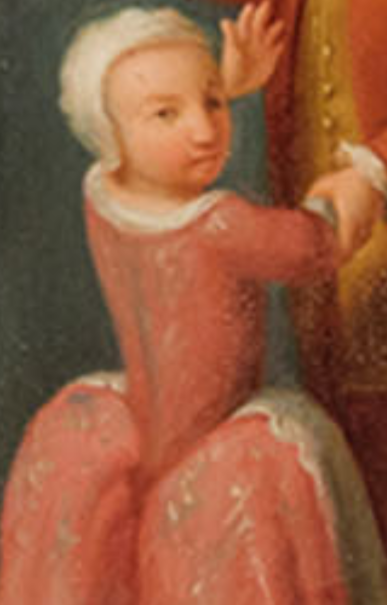
- Born: 22 June 1740; Royal Palace, Turin
- Died: 14 July 1742 (aged 2); Royal Palace, Turin
- Burial: Royal Basilica, Turin
Names
- Maria Vittoria Margherita di Savoia
- House: Savoy
- Father: Charles Emmanuel III of Sardinia
- Mother: Elisabeth Therese of Lorraine

Maria Vittoria Margherita of Savoy (22 June 1740 – 14 July 1742) was the youngest daughter of King Charles Emmanuel III of Sardinia.

== Biography ==
Princess Maria Vittoria was born in Turin. She was the second child of Charles Emmanuel III of Sardinia and Élisabeth Thérèse of Lorraine. Her mother died in 1741 giving birth to her brother Prince Benedetto. Maria Vittoria died in Turin aged 2, and was buried at Royal Basilica of Superga, Turin.

== Ancestry ==
Ancestors of Princess Maria Vittoria Margherita of Savoy

8. Charles Emmanuel I, Duke of Savoy
4. Victor Amadeus II of Sardinia
9. Princess Marie Jeanne of Savoy
2. Charles Emmanuel III of Sardinia
10. Philippe of France, Duke of Orléans
5. Anne Marie d'Orléans
11. Princess Henrietta of England
1. Princess Maria Vittoria of Savoy
12. Charles V, Duke of Lorraine
6. Leopold, Duke of Lorraine
13. Eleonor of Austria, Queen of Poland
3. Elisabeth Therese of Lorraine
14. Philippe of France, Duke of Orléans =10
7. Élisabeth Charlotte d'Orléans
15. Elizabeth Charlotte of the Palatinate
