= Charles Emmanuel III =

King of Sardinia from 1730 to 1773

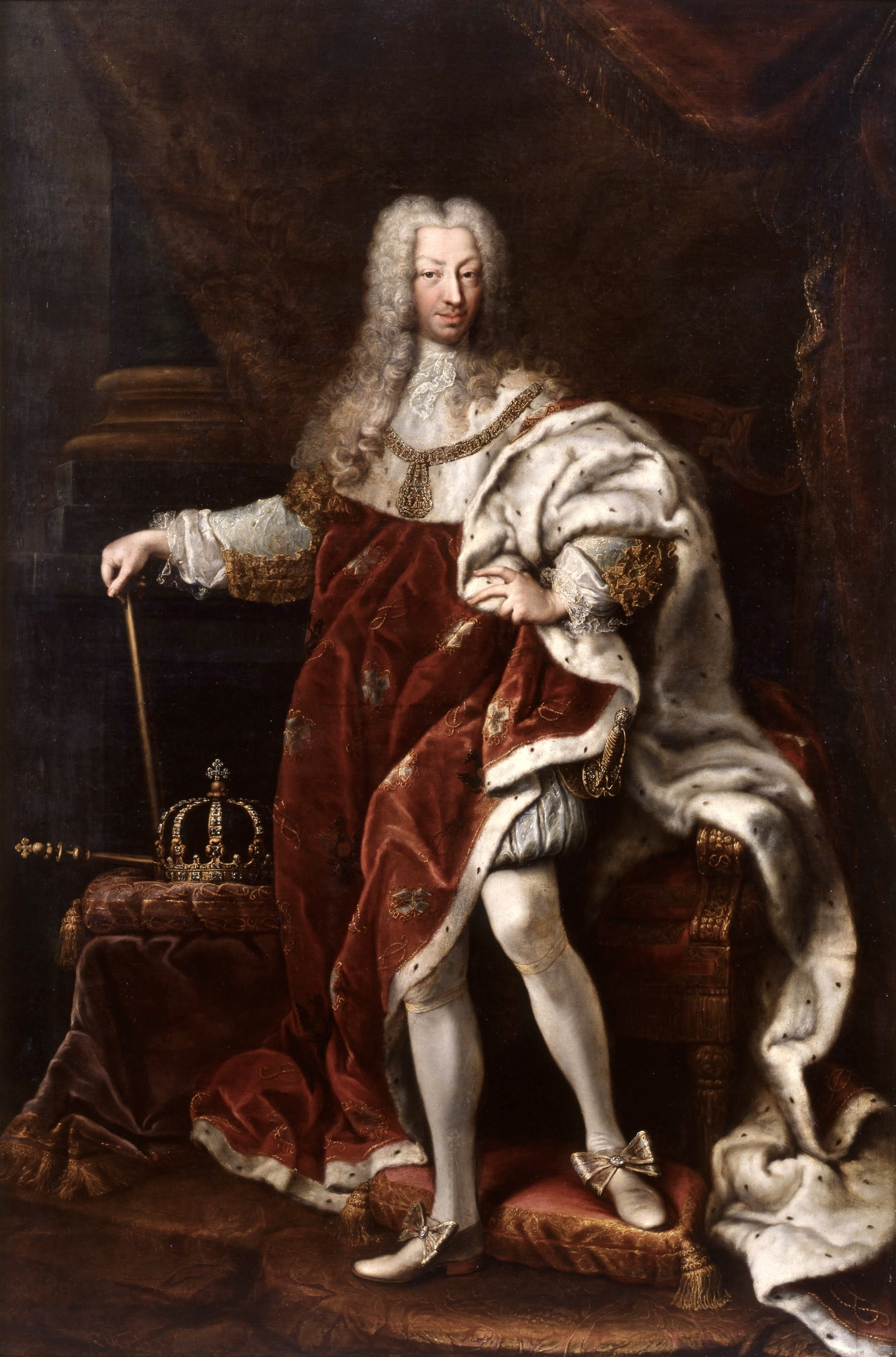
- Charles Emmanuel in his coronation robes, c. 1740s

King of Sardinia Duke of Savoy
- Reign: 3 September 1730 – 20 February 1773
- Predecessor: Victor Amadeus II
- Successor: Victor Amadeus III
- Born: 27 April 1701; Turin, Savoy
- Died: 20 February 1773 (aged 71); Turin, Savoy
- Burial: Basilica of Superga
- Spouses: Anne Christine of Palatine Sulzbach (m. 1722; died 1723) Polyxena of Hesse-Rheinfels-Rotenburg (m. 1724; died 1735) Elisabeth Therese of Lorraine (m. 1737; died 1741)
- Issue Detail: Prince Vittorio Amedeo; Victor Amadeus III; Princess Eleonora Maria; Princess Maria Luisa; Princess Maria Felicita; Prince Emanuele Filiberto; Carlo, Duke of Aosta; Princess Maria Vittoria; Benedetto, Duke of Chablais
- House: Savoy
- Father: Victor Amadeus II
- Mother: Anne Marie d'Orléans
- Religion: Catholic Church

Charles Emmanuel III (Italian: Carlo Emanuele III di Savoia; 27 April 1701 – 20 February 1773) was Duke of Savoy, King of Sardinia and ruler of the Savoyard states from his father's abdication on 3 September 1730 until his death in 1773. He was the paternal grandfather of the last three mainline kings of Sardinia. In the War of the Polish Succession, he initially gained Lombardy but later ceded it for smaller territorial gains. During the War of the Austrian Succession, he defended Piedmont against a Franco-Spanish army, winning the Battle of Assietta. The Treaty of Aix-la-Chapelle restored lost lands and expanded his territory. He strengthened ties with Spain through marriage alliances. He chose not to get involved in the Seven Years War and instead focused on administrative reforms and maintaining a well-disciplined army.

== Biography ==
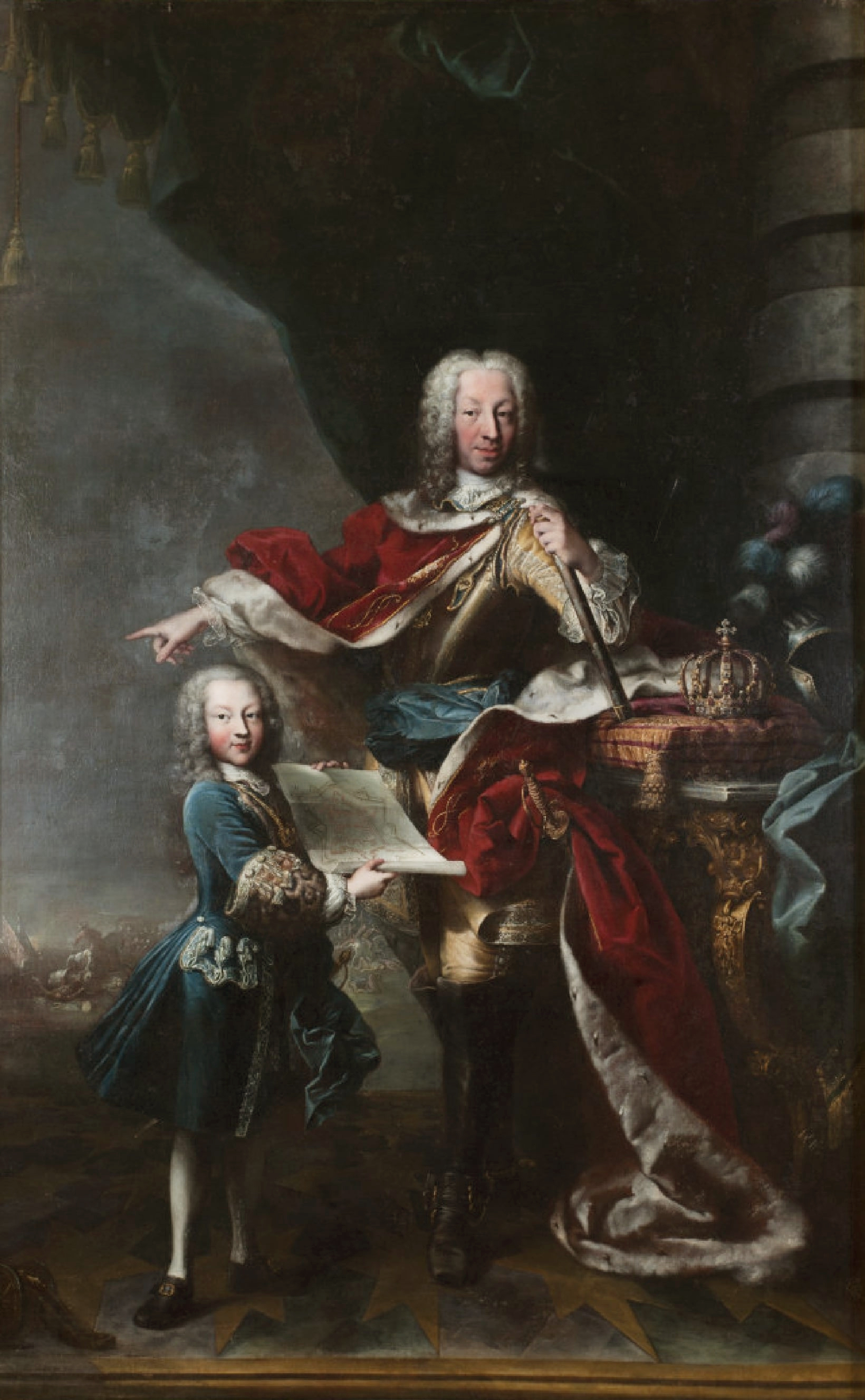
Charles Emmanuel and his son Victor Amadeus III.

=== Early life ===
Charles Emmanuel was born in Turin to Victor Amadeus II of Savoy and his first wife the French Anne Marie d'Orléans. His maternal grandparents were Prince Philippe of France and his first wife Princess Henrietta, the youngest daughter of Charles I of England and Henrietta Maria of France. Charles Emmanuel was the oldest surviving brother of Princess Maria Adelaide of Savoy – the mother of Louis XV of France; he was also the brother of Maria Luisa of Savoy, Queen of Spain as wife Philip V of Spain.

At the time of his birth, when he was known as Duke of Aosta, Charles Emmanuel was not the heir to Savoy; his older brother Victor Amadeus, Prince of Piedmont, was the heir apparent. Charles Emmanuel was the second of three sons that would be born to his parents. His older brother died in 1715 and Charles Emmanuel then became heir apparent.

As a result of his aid in the War of the Spanish Succession, Victor Amadeus II was made king of Sicily in 1713 under the Treaty of Utrecht which ended the war. Victor Amadeus was forced to exchange Sicily for the less important Kingdom of Sardinia in 1720 after objections from an alliance of four nations, including some of his former allies.

On 3 September 1730, Victor Amadeus who, in his later years had exhibited reticence and melancholy, abdicated the throne and retired from the royal court. His son became King Charles Emanuel III. He had not been a favorite of his father's, who had neglected his education except on the military field, where the son had sometimes accompanied the father.

After some time spent at his residence in Chambéry, however, the former king started to intervene in his son's government. Victor Amadeus reclaimed the throne, accusing his son of incompetence. He established himself in Moncalieri, but Charles Emmanuel managed to have the former king arrested by the Crown Council, in order to prevent him from attacking Milan and probably causing an invasion of Piedmont. Victor Amadeus was then confined to the Castle of Rivoli, where he later died without further interference with his son's regime.

=== The War of Polish Succession ===
In the War of the Polish Succession Charles Emmanuel sided with the French-backed king Stanislaw I. After the treaty of alliance signed in Turin, on 28 October 1733, he marched on Milan and occupied Lombardy without significant losses. However, when France tried to convince Philip V of Spain to join the coalition, he asked to receive Milan and Mantua in exchange. This was not acceptable for Charles Emmanuel, as it would recreate a Spanish domination in Italy as it had been in the previous centuries. While negotiations continued about the matter, the Savoy-French-Spanish troops attacked Mantua under the supreme command of Charles Emmanuel himself.

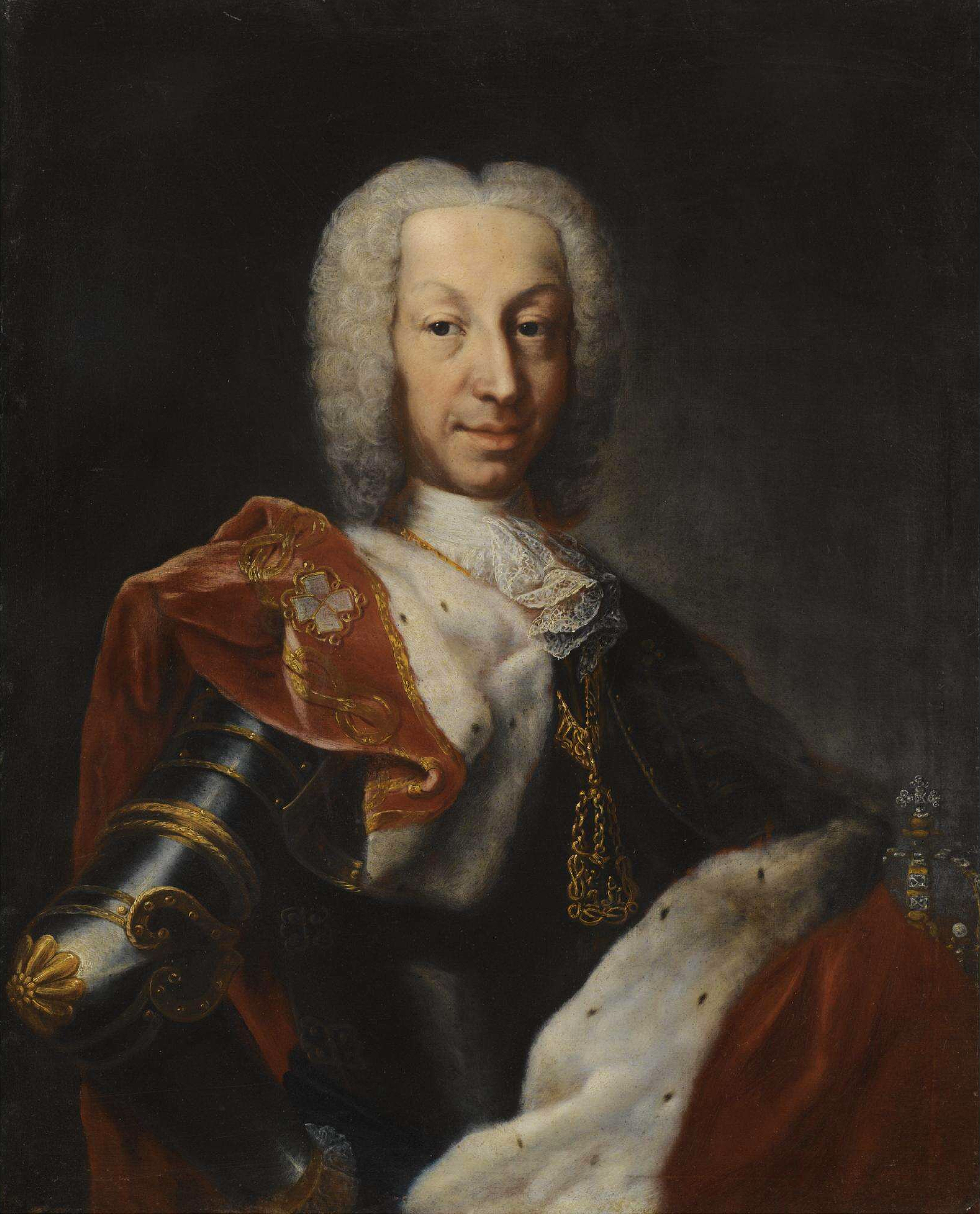
Charles Emmanuel in armour

Sure that in the end Mantua would be assigned to Spain, he voluntarily thwarted the expedition. The Franco-Piedmontese army was victorious in two battles at Crocetta and Guastalla. In the end, when Austria and France signed a peace, Charles was forced to leave Lombardy. In exchange, he was given some territories, including Langhe, Tortona and Novara.

=== War of the Austrian Succession ===
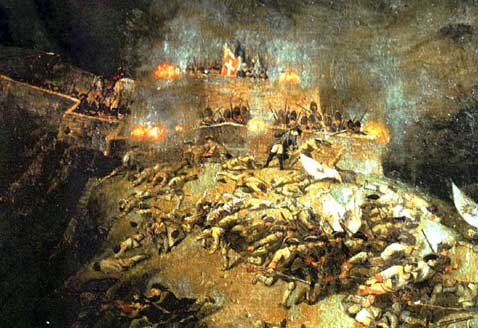
The battle of Assietta during the War of the Austrian Succession 1747

Charles Emmanuel sided with Maria Theresa of Austria in the War of the Austrian Succession, receiving financial and naval support from Great Britain and the Dutch Republic. After noteworthy but inconclusive initial successes, he had to face the French-Spanish invasion of Savoy and, after a failed allied attempt to conquer the Kingdom of Naples, the County of Nice. When the enemy army invaded Piedmont, in 1744 he defended Cuneo against the Spanish-French besiegers. The following year, with some 20,000 men, he was faced with an invasion of two armies with a total of some 60,000 troops. The important strongholds of Alessandria, Asti and Casale fell. In 1746, after receiving reinforcements from Austria, he was able to recapture Alessandria and Asti. In 1747, he obtained a crushing victory over the French at the Battle of Assietta, and his territories were saved when the main battleground moved northwards to the Netherlands.

The outcome was the Treaty of Aix-la-Chapelle, which revealed his qualities as a negotiator, in as much as he both regained the lost provinces of Nice and Savoy, and obtained Vigevano as well as other lands in the Pianura Padana. Ties with Spain were re-established with the marriage of his son Prince Victor Amadeus to the Infanta Maria Antonia Ferdinanda of Spain in 1750.

He declined to participate in the Seven Years' War (1756–63), preferring to concentrate on administrative reforms, maintaining a well-disciplined army and strengthening his fortresses. In an attempt to improve the poor condition of the newly acquired Sardinia, he also restored the Universities of Sassari and Cagliari.

Charles Emmanuel died in Turin in 1773. He was buried in the Basilica of Superga.

== Art collector ==
Charles Emmanuel's ancestors were avid art collectors. He added many new paintings to the collection he inherited from his ancestors. He also received paintings from the collection of Prince Eugene of Savoy who had remained childless. The collection contained many works of Flemish and Dutch painters. As a result, the Sabauda Gallery in Turin was the largest collection in Italy of 16th and 17th-century Flemish and Dutch paintings. In 1731 he established a tapestry workshop in Turin. The Flemish battle painter Jan Peeter Verdussen was his court painter and painted many of his military victories.

== Marriages and issue ==
Charles Emmanuel married three times, but all of his three wives died young. There were plans for him to marry his cousin Charlotte Aglaé d'Orléans, but his mother declined the offer. Amalia d'Este, daughter of Rinaldo, Duke of Modena, and Infanta Francisca Josefa of Portugal, daughter of Pedro II of Portugal, were also candidates.

Coat of Arms of Kings of Sardinia of House of Savoy after 1720.

- Countess Palatine Anne Christine of Sulzbach (1704–1723), daughter of Theodore Eustace of Sulzbach and Princess Maria Eleonore of Hesse-Rheinfels-Rotenburg. She died a few days after giving birth to a son:
1. Prince Vittorio Amedeo Theodore of Savoy (1723–1725) died in infancy.

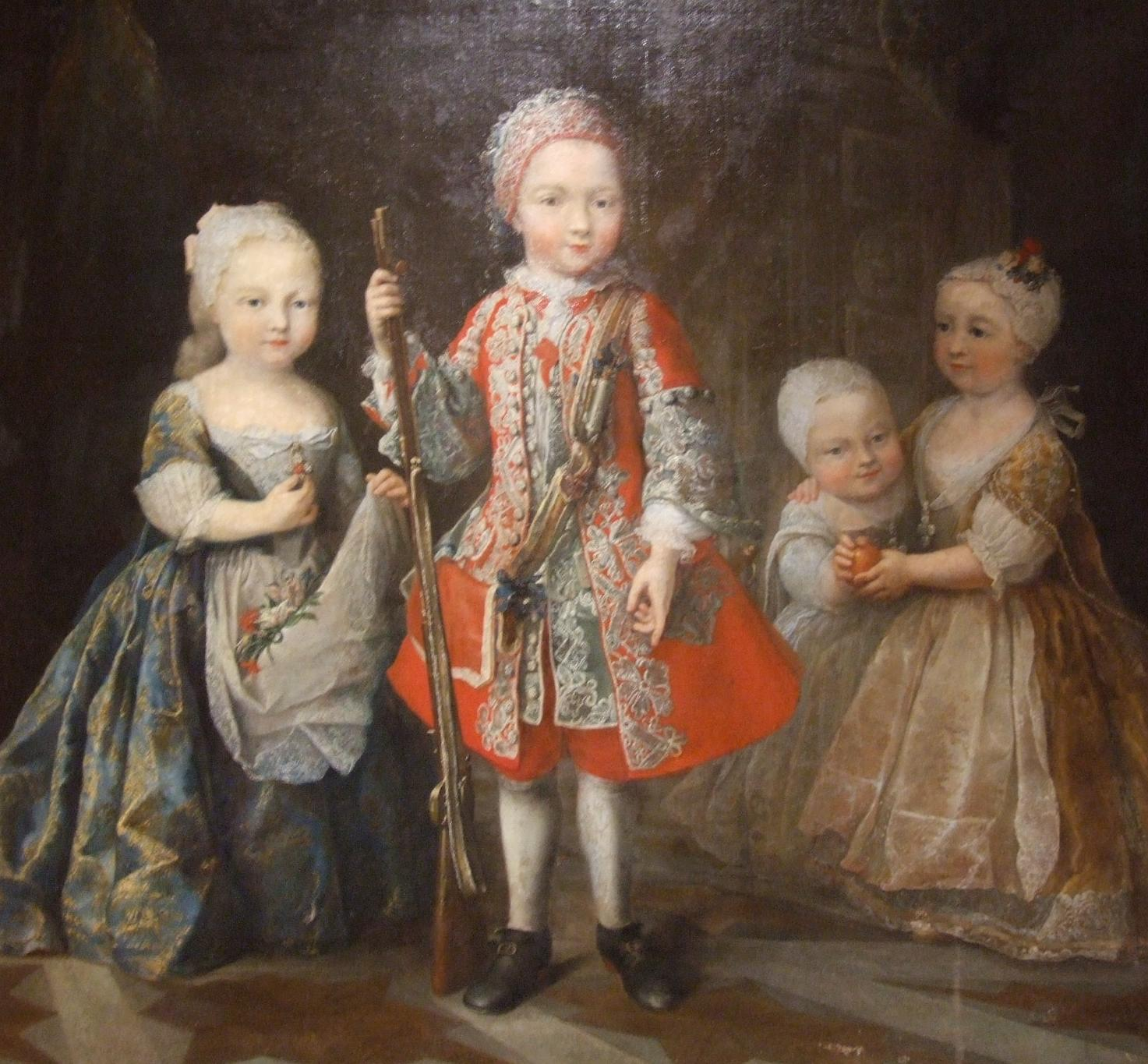
The children of Charles and his second wife; (L-R) Eleonora; Victor Amadeus; Maria Felicita and Maria Luisa Gabriella.

- Princess Polyxena of Hesse-Rheinfels-Rotenburg (1706–1735), daughter of Ernest Leopold, Landgrave of Hesse-Rheinfels-Rotenburg (maternal uncle of his first spouse) and his wife Maria Anna of Löwenstein-Wertheim-Rochefort. Polyxena bore him six children:
1. Victor Amadeus III of Sardinia (1726–1796); married Infanta Maria Antonietta of Spain and had issue.
2. Princess Eleonora Maria Teresa of Savoy (1728–1781), unmarried.
3. Princess Maria Luisa Gabriella of Savoy (1729-1767), a nun.
4. Princess Maria Felicita of Savoy (1730–1801), unmarried.
5. Prince Emanuele Filiberto of Savoy, Duke of Aosta (1731–1735) died in early childhood.
6. Prince Carlo Francesco Romualdo of Savoy, Duke of Chablais (23 July 1733 - 28 December 1733) died in infancy.
- Princess Elisabeth Thérèse of Lorraine (1711–1741) daughter of Leopold, Duke of Lorraine and his wife Élisabeth Charlotte d'Orléans, a niece of Louis XIV of France. Elisabeth Thérèse was a younger sister of Francis I, Holy Roman Emperor, the husband of Empress Maria Theresa of Austria. The couple married in 1737, and Elisabeth Thérèse bore him three children:
1. Prince Carlo Francesco of Savoy, Duke of Aosta (1738–1745) died in childhood.
2. Princess Maria Vittoria Margherita of Savoy (1740–1742) died in infancy.
3. Prince Benedetto of Savoy (1741–1808), Duke of Chablais (-1796) and Marquis of Ivrea (1796–1808). He married his niece Princess Maria Ana of Savoy (1757–1824), daughter of Victor Amadeus III of Sardinia, no issue.

== Ancestry ==
Ancestors of Charles Emmanuel III

8. Victor Amadeus I, Duke of Savoy
4. Charles Emmanuel II, Duke of Savoy
9. Christine of France
2. Victor Amadeus II of Sardinia
10. Charles Amadeus, Duke of Nemours
5. Marie Jeanne Baptiste of Savoy
11. Élisabeth de Bourbon
1. Charles Emmanuel III of Sardinia
12. Louis XIII of France
6. Philippe I, Duke of Orléans
13. Anne of Austria
3. Anne Marie of Orléans
14. Charles I of England
7. Henrietta of England
15. Henrietta Maria of France

== Bibliography ==
- Raggi, Giuseppina (2019). "The Lost Opportunity: Two Projects of Filippo Juvarra Concerning Royal Theaters and the Marriage Policy between the Courts of Turin and Lisbon (1719-1722)". Music in Art: International Journal for Music Iconography. 44 (1–2): 119–137. ISSN 1522-7464.
