= Maria Giovanna Clementi =

Italian artist (1692–1761)

- Born: 1692; Turin
- Died: 1761 (aged 68–69)
- Movement: Baroque
- Spouse: Giuseppe Bartolomeo Clementi

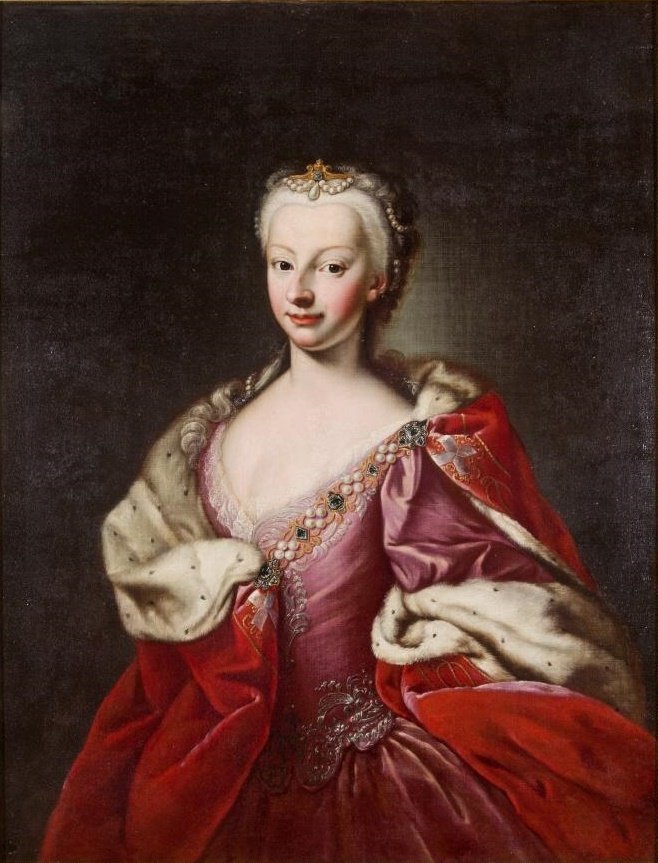
Queen Polyxena of Hesse-Rotenburg, oil on canvas, 102x80 cm, Madrid, Museum Cerralbo.

Maria Giovanna Clementi (1692–1761), called la Clementina, was an Italian painter, specializing in portraits.

== Biography ==
She was born in Turin, the daughter of a surgeon, Giovanni Pietro Giuseppe Bussano (Bussana, Buzana) and Maria Cristina Ausineti. Her husband was Giuseppe Bartolomeo Clementi, about whom little is known. She trained in Turin with court painter Giovanni Battista Curlando, who advised her to specialize in portraits. In 1733 she resided with her husband in the palace of Count Carlo Giacinto Roero.

Some documents show that at least since 1722, she worked for the court, painting portraits of members of the royal family of Savoy that were to be exchanged with other European courts.

== List of works ==
- Portrait of Victor Amadeus II of Sardinia, See Here
- Portrait of Anne Marie d'Orléans, See Here
- Portrait of the Princess of Piedmont (1722) See Here
- Portrait of Prince Vittorio Amedeo Theodore of Savoy (1725) See Here
- Portrait of Princess Maria Felicita of Savoy (1725) See Here
- Portrait of the sons of Charles Emmanuel III of Sardinia (1730) See Here
- Portrait of Princess Maria Luisa of Savoy (1732) See Here
- Portrait of Vittoria Maria Elisabetta Gazzelli See Here
- Portrait of Victor Amadeus III of Sardinia See Here
- Portrait of Charles Emmanuel III of Sardinia See Here
- Portrait of Polyxena of Hesse, Queen of Sardinia See Here
- Portrait of Michele Antonio Saluzzo See Here
- Portrait of Peter the Great See Here
