= Polyxena of Hesse-Rotenburg =

Queen of Sardinia from 1730 to 1735

Polyxena of Hesse-Rheinfels-Rotenburg
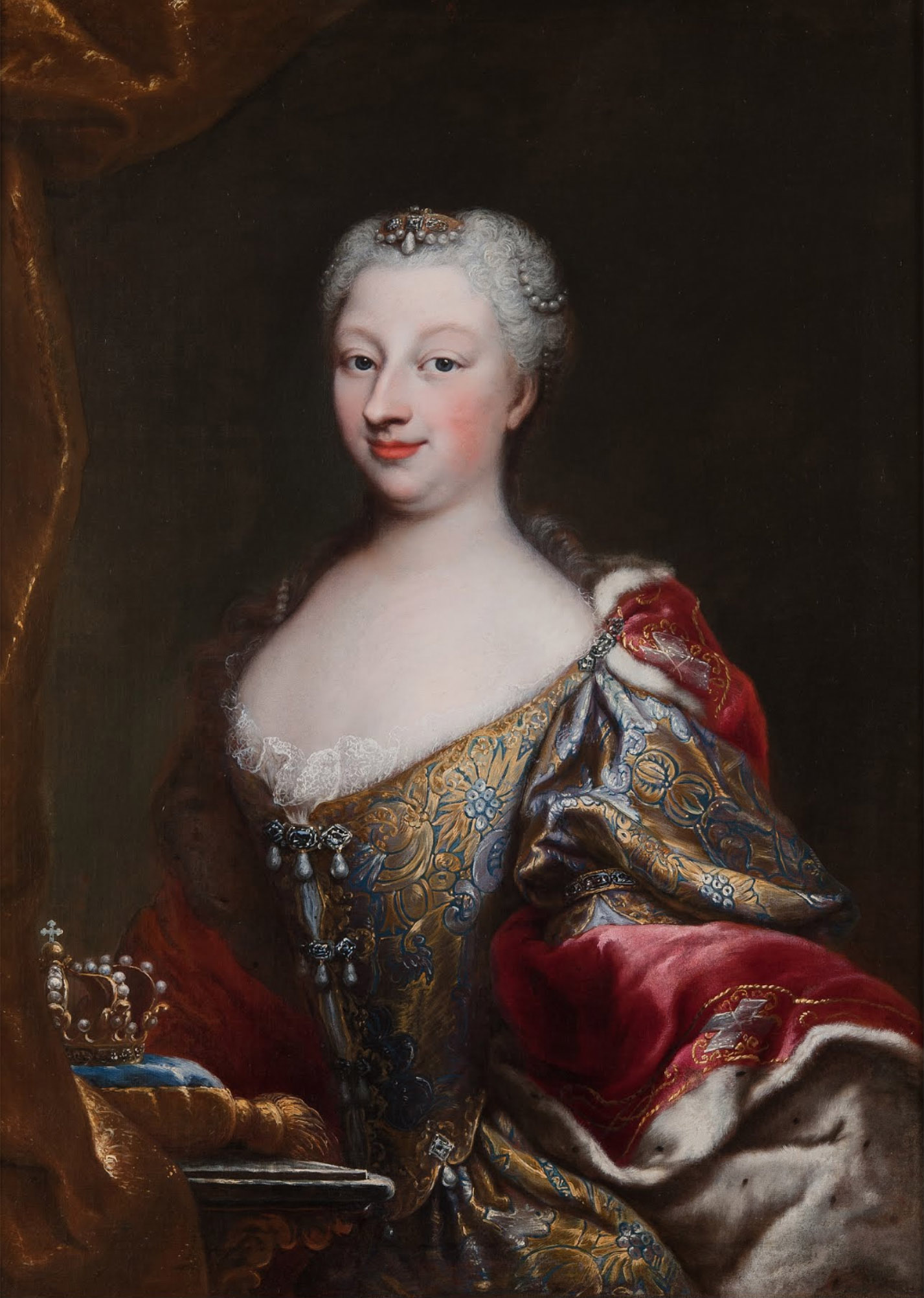
- Portrait by Maria Giovanna Clementi, c. 1728–1730

Queen consort of Sardinia
- Tenure: 3 September 1730 – 13 January 1735
- Born: 21 September 1706; Langenschwalbach, Hesse
- Died: 13 January 1735 (aged 28); Royal Palace of Turin
- Burial: 1786; Basilica of Superga, Turin
- Spouse: Charles Emmanuel III of Sardinia (m. 1724)
- Issue Detail: Victor Amadeus III, King of Sardinia; Princess Eleonora; Princess Maria Luisa; Princess Maria Felicita; Prince Emanuele Filiberto
Names
- Polyxena Christina Johanna
- House: Hesse-Rotenburg
- Father: Ernest Leopold, Landgrave of Hesse-Rotenburg
- Mother: Countess Eleonore of Löwenstein-Wertheim-Rochefort

Princess Polyxena of Hesse-Rheinfels-Rotenburg (Polyxena Christina Johanna; 21 September 1706 – 13 January 1735) was the second wife of Charles Emmanuel, Prince of Piedmont whom she married in 1724. The mother of the future Victor Amadeus III, she was Queen of Sardinia from 1730 until her death in 1735.

== Early life ==
Polyxena was born as the eldest daughter of Ernst Leopold, Landgrave of Hesse-Rheinfels-Rotenburg and Princess Eleonore of Löwenstein-Wertheim-Rochefort, daughter of Maximilian Karl Albert, Prince of Löwenstein-Wertheim-Rochefort.

== Queen of Sardinia ==
King Victor Amadeus II of Sardinia approached her family and proposed a union between Polyxena and Victor Amadeus II's son and heir, Charles Emmanuel, Prince of Piedmont. A previous match orchestrated by Agostino Steffani with a daughter of Rinaldo d'Este, Duke of Modena, had come to nothing. His first wife, Countess Palatine Anne Christine of Sulzbach, died on 12 March 1723, less than a year after her marriage and barely a week after giving birth to a son, Victor Amadeus, Duke of Aosta (7 March 1723 – 1 August 1725).

Although only two years younger, Polyxena was a niece of Charles Emanuel's first wife, and belonged to the Hesse-Rotenburg line, which was the only Roman Catholic branch (since 1652) of the reigning House of Hesse. She had been nominally a canoness of Thorn Abbey since 1720.

The engagement was announced on 2 July 1724, and she wed Charles Emmanuel by proxy on 23 July in Rotenburg. The marriage was celebrated in person at Thonon in Chablais on 20 August 1724.

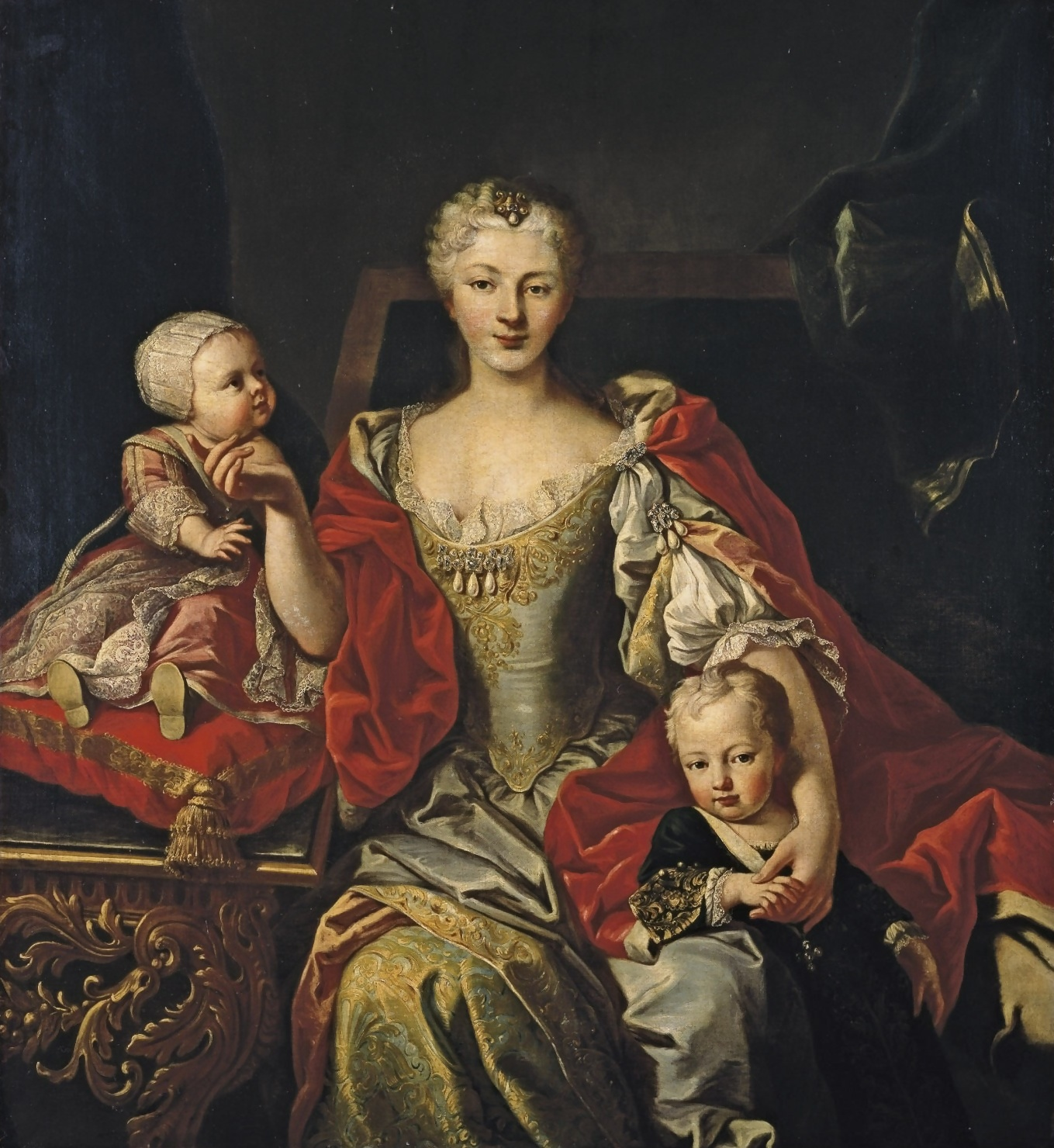
Queen Polyxena with two of her children: Princess Eleonora (left) and Victor Amadeus (right).

Her stepson Victor Amadeus, heir after his father and grandfather to the Sardinian crown, died at the age of two, a year after Polyxena's marriage and before she had a child of her own. Nonetheless, she is said to have had a close relationship with her mother-in-law, Anne Marie d'Orléans, and the two frequented the Villa della Regina outside the capital, where the latter died in 1728.

When King Victor Amadeus announced his decision to return to the throne after having abdicated in 1730, Polyxena used her influence over her husband to have his father imprisoned at the Castle of Moncalieri, where he was joined for a while by his morganatic wife, Anna Canalis di Cumiana, Polyxena's former lady of the bedchamber.

In an 1869 history of the House of Savoy, Francesco Predari wrote that despite the fact Polyxena was praised for goodness of character and beautiful virtues, her father-in-law advised her to take care to maintain separate quarters from her husband for prudence's sake. In 1732 she founded a home for young mothers in Turin, redecorated the Villa della Regina, Stupinigi's hunting lodge, and the Church of Saint Joseph in Turin. She carried out various improvements with Filippo Juvarra and popularised chinoiserie. She was also a patron of Giovanni Battista Crosato, a baroque painter.

Having been ill since June 1734, she died at the Royal Palace of Turin, and has been buried in the Royal Basilica of Superga since 1786. Two years after her death, her widower married Princess Elisabeth Therese of Lorraine, sister of the future Francis I, Holy Roman Emperor.

== Legacy ==
The senior branch of the House of Savoy ended with her grandson Charles Felix of Sardinia. The Villa Polissena in Rome is named in her honour.

== Issue ==
- Victor Amadeus III of Sardinia (26 June 1726 – 16 October 1796), had issue.
- Princess Eleonora of Savoy (28 February 1728 – 14 August 1781), unwed.
- Princess Luisa (25 March 1729 – 22 June 1767), unwed.
- Princess Maria Felicita (19 March 1730 – 13 May 1801), unwed.
- Prince Emanuele Filiberto of Savoy, Duke of Aosta (17 May 1731 – 23 April 1735).
- Prince Carlo of Savoy, Duke of Chablais (23 July 1733 – 28 December 1733).

== Ancestry ==
Ancestors of Polyxena of Hesse-Rotenburg

8. Ernest, Landgrave of Hesse-Rheinfels-Rotenburg
4. William, Landgrave of Hesse-Rotenburg
9. Countess Marie Eleonore of Solms-Hohensolms
2. Ernest Leopold, Landgrave of Hesse-Rotenburg
10. Ferdinand Karl, Count of Löwenstein-Wertheim-Rochefort
5. Countess Maria Anna of Löwenstein-Wertheim-Rochefort
11. Countess Anna Maria of Fürstenberg-Heiligenberg
1. Polyxena of Hesse-Rheinfels-Rotenburg
12. Ferdinand Karl, Count of Löwenstein-Wertheim-Rochefort (=10)
6. Maximilian Karl, Prince of Löwenstein-Wertheim-Rochefort
13. Countess Anna Maria of Fürstenberg-Heiligenberg (=11)
3. Countess Eleonore of Löwenstein-Wertheim-Rochefort
14. Mathias Khuen von Belasi, Count zu Lichtenberg und Gandegg
7. Countess Polyxena Khuen von Belasi
15. Countess Anna Susanna von Meggau zu Kreutzen

== Bibliography ==
- Cantogno. Domenico Carutti di: Storia del regno di Carlo Emanuele III Turin, 1859
- Symcox. Geoffrey: Victor Amadeus II: absolutism in the Savoyard State, 1675-1730, University of California Press, 1983, ISBN 978-0-520-04974-1
- Huberty, Michel; Giraud, F. Alain; Magdelaine, F. & B (1976), L'Allemagne Dynastique (Tome I Hesse-Reuss-Saxe), Le Perreux: A. Giraud, ISBN 2-901138-01-2
- Marek, Miroslav (2008), "Rulers of Savoy and Sicily", Genealogy.EU
- Tourtchine. Jean-Fred: Les manuscrits du C.E.D.R.E. – Dictionnaire Historique et Généalogique, vol. I. Le Royaume d'Italie, Cercle d'Études des Dynasties Royales Européennes (president, Jean-Fred Tourtchine), Paris, 1992. ISSN 0993-3964.
- Vitelleschi. Marchese: The romance of Savoy, Victor Amadeus II. and his Stuart bride Volume II, Harvard College Library, New York, 1905

Polyxena of Hesse-Rotenburg House of Hesse-Rotenburg Cadet branch of the House of Hesse Born: 21 September 1706 Died: 13 January 1735
Italian royalty
Vacant Title last held by Anne Marie d'Orléans	Queen consort of Sardinia; 3 September 1730 – 13 January 1735	Vacant Title next held by Elisabeth Therese of Lorraine
