= Elisabeth Therese of Lorraine =

Queen of Sardinia from 1737 to 1741

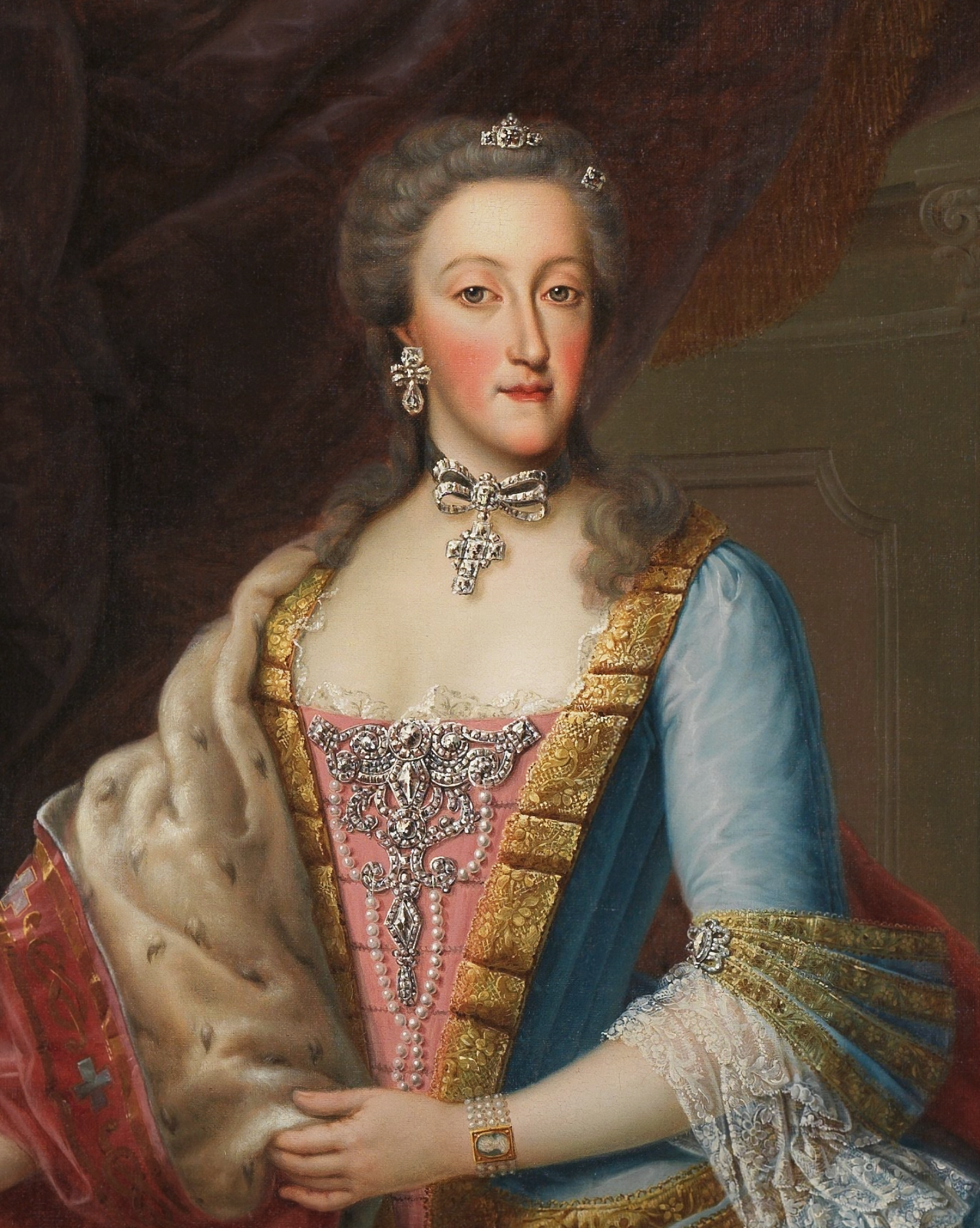
- Detail of a portrait by Giovanni Panealbo

Queen consort of Sardinia
- Tenure: 1 April 1737 – 3 July 1741
- Born: 15 October 1711; Château de Lunéville, Duchy of Lorraine
- Died: 3 July 1741 (aged 29); Palace of Venaria, Turin
- Burial: 1786; Royal Basilica of Superga
- Spouse: Charles Emmanuel III (m. 1737)
- Issue Detail: Carlo, Duke of Aosta; Princess Maria Vittoria; Benedetto, Duke of Chablais
- House: Lorraine
- Father: Leopold, Duke of Lorraine
- Mother: Élisabeth Charlotte d'Orléans

Elisabeth Therese of Lorraine (15 October 1711 – 3 July 1741) was Queen of Sardinia as the third wife of King Charles Emmanuel III. She was born a Princess of Lorraine as the daughter of Leopold, Duke of Lorraine and Élisabeth Charlotte d'Orléans. She became the coadjutor bishop of Remiremont Abbey in 1734, before her marriage to Charles Emmanuel III. She died of puerperal fever, following the birth of her only surviving child, prince Benedetto.

== Early life (1711–1736) ==
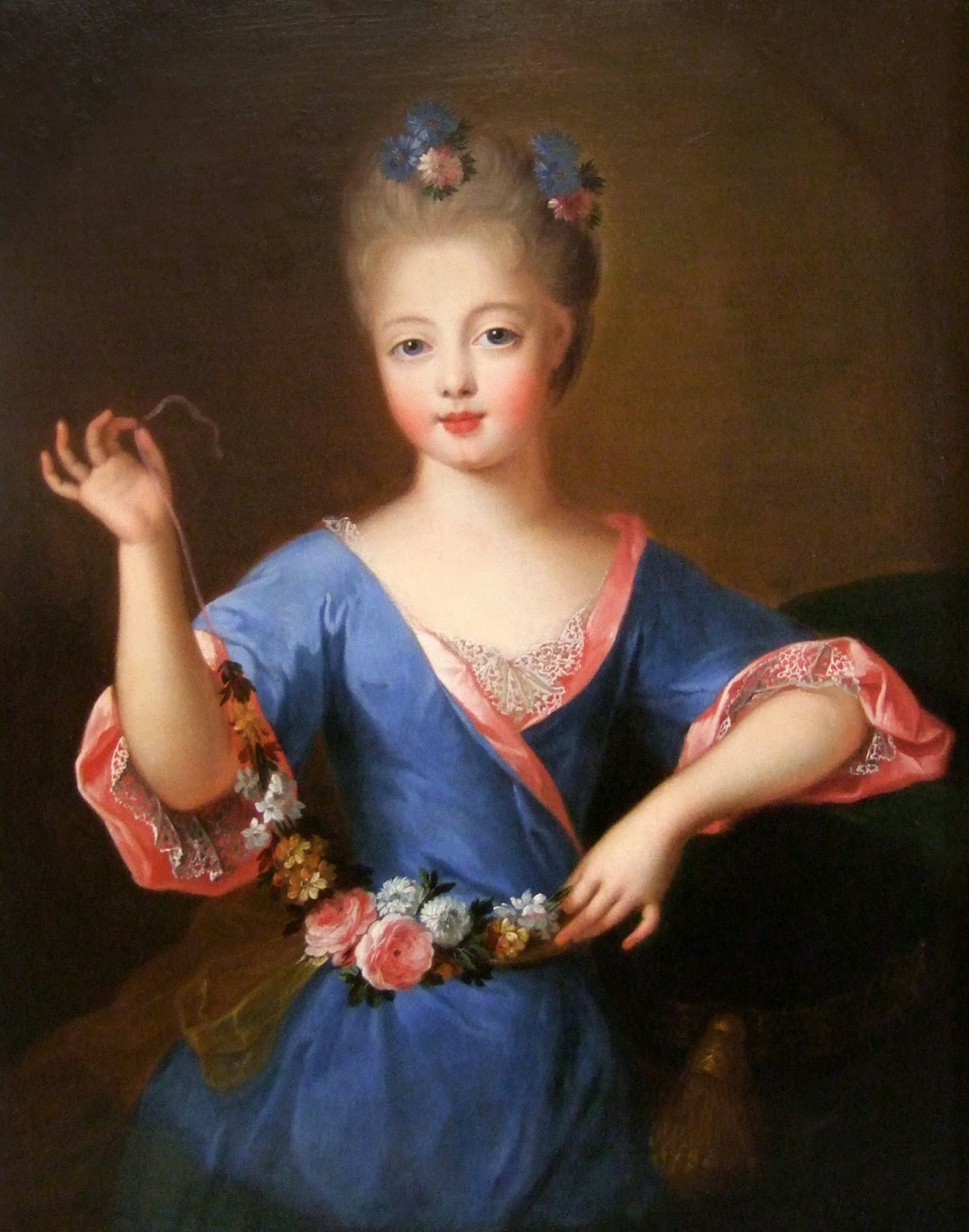
Elisabeth Therese as a princess of Lorraine, by Pierre Gobert

Princess Elisabeth Therese was born on 15 October 1711 at the Château de Lunéville in Lorraine. She was the seventh daughter and eleventh child of Leopold Joseph of Lorraine and his wife, Élisabeth Charlotte d'Orléans. As a Princess of Lorraine, she was entitled to the style of Highness as well as the rank of foreign princess in France.

During the coronation of Louis XV in October 1722, Elisabeth Therese, her mother, and her sisters Anne Charlotte and Marie Louise went to the French royal court. Elisabeth Therese's grandmother, Princess Palatine, found her three granddaughters very charming as well as attractive, though Anne Charlotte was deemed the most beautiful.

In the spring of 1725, the young French king, Louis XV, was fifteen and unmarried. He was engaged to Mariana Victoria of Spain, but the young princess was sent back to Spain because she was too young to conceive. As a result, Élisabeth Charlotte began negotiations to marry Elisabeth Therese to the king. However, this was met with opposition from the king's prime minister, the Duke of Bourbon, who arranged for the king to marry an obscure Polish princess Marie Leszczyńska whom Louis XV quickly fell in love with later that year. The Duke of Bourbon stated that marriages between kings of France and princesses of Lorraine always resulted in strife, and that the House of Lorraine was too closely related to the House of Habsburg, which would cause discontent and conflict within the French nobility.

Her father died in 1729 amid negotiations regarding a marriage between the then seventeen-year-old Elisabeth Therese and her recently widowed cousin Louis, Duke of Orléans. He refused outright, much to the annoyance of her mother. The match having come to nothing, her mother named her daughter the coadjutrice of Remiremont Abbey on 19 October 1734. The Remiremont Abbey was closely associated with the House of Lorraine.

In 1736, her brother, the Duke of Lorraine, married Archduchess Maria Theresa of Austria, daughter and heiress apparent of Charles VI, Holy Roman Emperor. The union between the House of Lorraine and the House of Habsburg allowed a more prestigious marriage for the unwed princess. The already twice widowed Charles Emmanuel III of Sardinia asked for her hand in late 1736.

== Queen of Sardinia (1737–1741) ==
She married the King of Sardinia by proxy on 5 March 1737 at Château de Lunéville, with the Prince of Carignan, who was the prince's brother-in-law, acting as the king. The day after the proxy marriage, she left for Lyon, where she arrived on 14 March. Her brother, the Duke of Lorraine, raised a dowry for her, and the marriage contract was signed in Vienna by the Duke and Duchess of Lorraine and Emperor Charles VI.

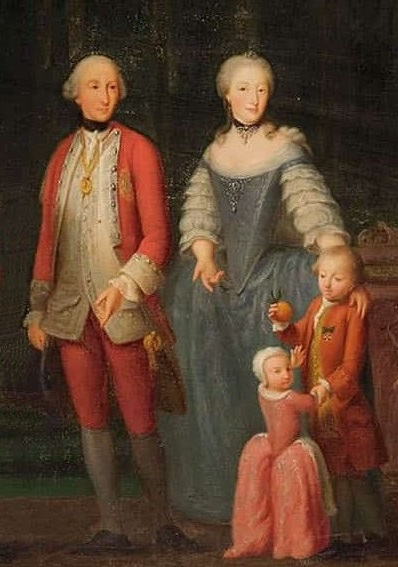
Posthumous depiction of Elisabeth Therese with her three children, Prince Carlo Francesco, Princess Maria Vittoria, and Prince Benedetto

The couple married in person on 1 April 1737. Charles Emmanuel III was her half-first cousin, his mother being Anne Marie d'Orléans, her mother Élisabeth Charlotte's half-sister. The marriage would produce three children, but only one would live to adulthood. She and her husband arrived in Turin on 21 April.

=== Death and burial ===
Elisabeth Therese died at the Palace of Venaria aged 29, having fallen ill with puerperal fever after childbirth. She was buried in the Cathedral of Saint Giovanni Battista in Turin. She was moved to the Royal Basilica of Superga in 1786 by her stepson Victor Amadeus III.

== Issue ==
1. Prince Carlo Francesco of Savoy (Carlo Francesco Maria Augusto; 1 December 1738 – 25 March 1745) died in childhood.
2. Princess Maria Vittoria of Savoy (Vittoria Margherita; 22 June 1740 – 14 July 1742) died in infancy.
3. Prince Benedetto of Savoy (Benedetto Maria Maurizio; 21 June 1741 – 4 January 1808) married Princess Maria Anna of Savoy, no issue.

== Ancestry ==
Ancestors of Elisabeth Therese of Lorraine

8. Nicholas II, Duke of Lorraine
4. Charles V, Duke of Lorraine
9. Claude Françoise of Lorraine
2. Leopold, Duke of Lorraine
10. Ferdinand III, Holy Roman Emperor
5. Eleanor of Austria
11. Eleonora Gonzaga
1. Élisabeth Thérèse of Lorraine
12. Louis XIII of France
6. Philippe I, Duke of Orléans
13. Anne of Austria
3. Élisabeth Charlotte d'Orléans
14. Charles I Louis, Elector Palatine
7. Elizabeth Charlotte of the Palatinate
15. Charlotte of Hesse-Kassel

== References and notes ==
=== Bibliography ===
- Augustin, Calmet (1757). Histoire de Lorraine...depuis l'entrée de Jules César dans les Gaules jusqu'à la cession de la Lorraine, arrivée en 1737 (in French). A. Leseure. pp. 70–309.
- Foucault (1791). Histoire de Léopold I, duc de Lorraine et de Bar, père de l'Empereur (in French). Paris. p. 340.

Elisabeth Therese of Lorraine House of Lorraine Born: 15 October 1711 Died: 3 July 1741
Italian royalty
| Vacant Title last held by Polyxena of Hesse-Rotenburg | Queen consort of Sardinia; 1 April 1737 – 3 July 1741 | Vacant Title next held by Maria Antonia Ferdinanda of Spain |
