= Princess Maria Luisa of Savoy (1729–1767) =

Princess of Savoy (1729–1767)

Princess Maria Luisa
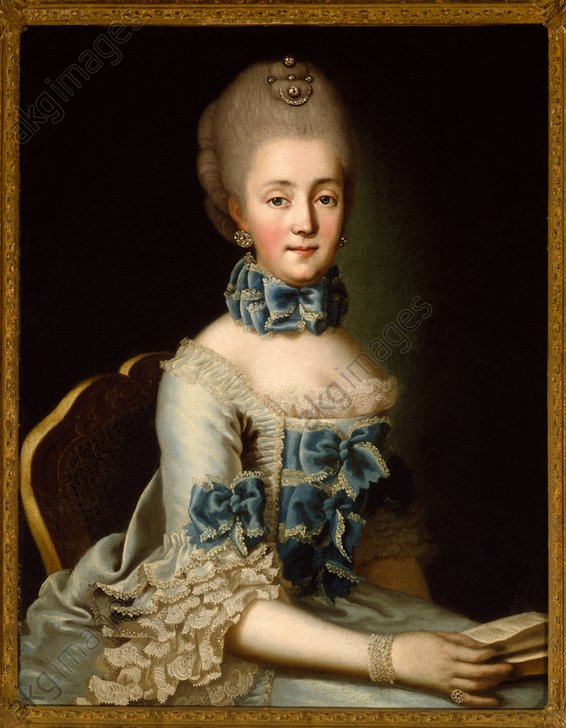
- 1765 painting
- Born: 25 March 1729; Royal Palace of Turin, Turin
- Died: 22 June 1767 (aged 38); Rome, Italy
- Burial: Royal Basilica of Superga, Turin
Names
- Maria Luisa Gabriela di Savoia
- House: Savoy
- Father: Charles Emmanuel III
- Mother: Polyxena of Hesse-Rotenburg

Maria Luisa Gabriella of Savoy (25 March 1729 – 22 June 1767) was a princess of Savoy.

== Biography ==
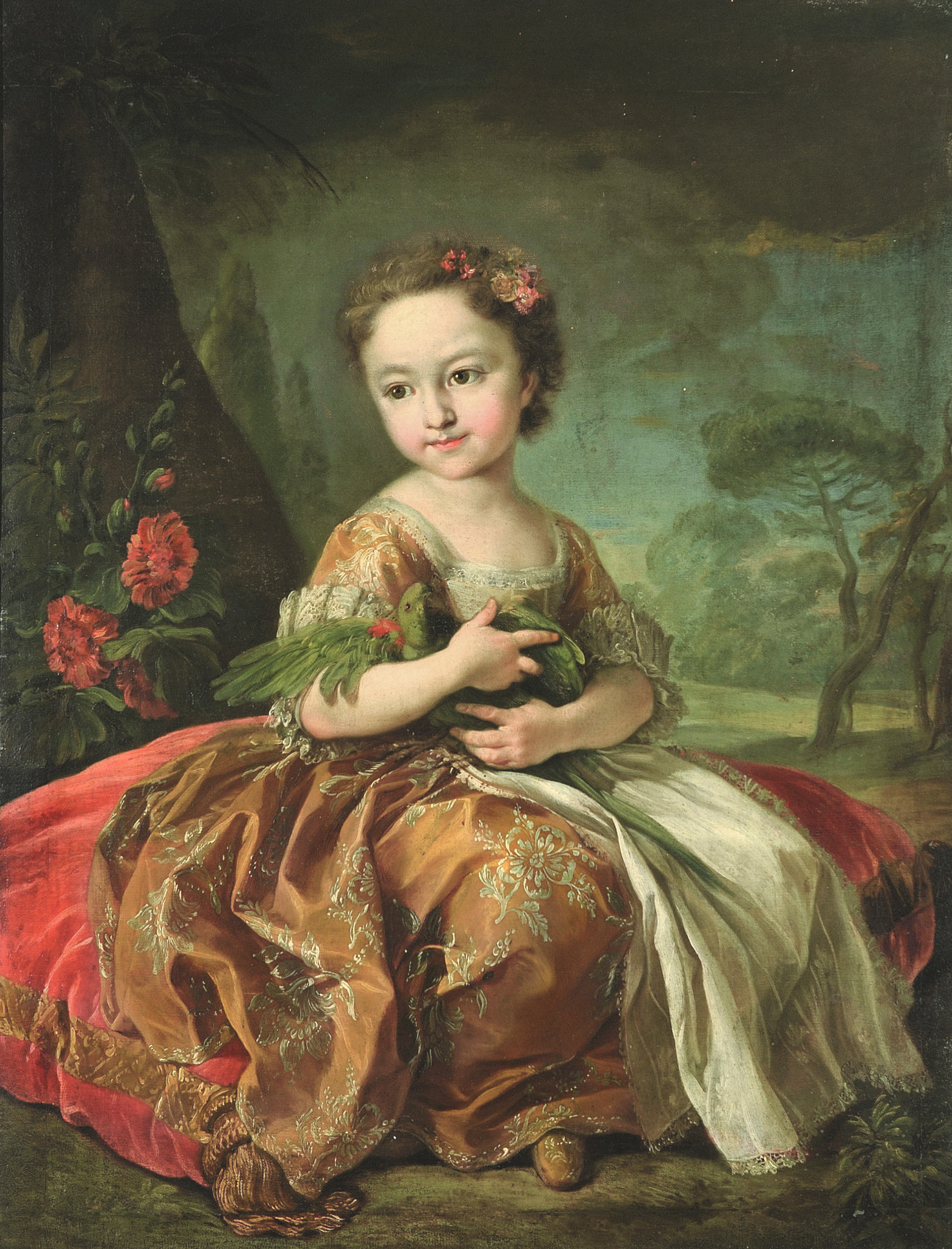
Princess Maria Luisa by Louis-Michel van Loo.

Maria Luisa was the second daughter born to the reigning King of Sardinia and his second wife, the German Princess Polyxena of Hessen-Rheinfels-Rotenburg who died in 1735, Marie Luisa being just five years of age. She was named after her aunt, Maria Luisa Gabriella of Savoy (1688–1714) who was Queen of Spain as wife of Philip V of Spain.

Her maternal cousins included Victor Amadeus I, Prince of Carignano and his younger sister the future princesse de Lamballe, both of whom were born at the court of Savoy. Her paternal cousins included Ferdinand VI of Spain, who was king of Spain at the time of her birth.

Like her older sister, Eleonora, Maria Luisa was a proposed bride for Louis, Dauphin of France. The Dauphin was the eldest son of King Louis XV, who in turn was her first cousin.

The marriage between linking the rulers of France and Savoy never materialised, Louis marrying an Infanta of Spain who died in childbirth and then a Princess of Saxony. Like all her sisters, Maria Luisa would remain unmarried, dying at the age of 38 in Turin. She was buried at the Royal Basilica of Superga overlooking Turin. Her father died in 1773 and her oldest brother Victor Amadeus of Savoy succeeded as King.

== Ancestry ==
Ancestors of Princess Maria Luisa of Savoy (1729–1767)

8. Charles Emmanuel I, Duke of Savoy
4. Victor Amadeus II of Sardinia
9. Marie Jeanne of Savoy
2. Charles Emmanuel III of Sardinia
10. Philippe I, Duke of Orléans
5. Anne Marie d'Orléans
11. Henrietta of England
1. Princess Maria Luisa of Savoy
12. William, Landgrave of Hesse-Rotenburg
6. Ernest Leopold, Landgrave of Hesse-Rotenburg
13. Maria Anna of Löwenstein-Wertheim-Rochefort
3. Polyxena of Hesse-Rotenburg
14. Maximilian Charles Albert of Löwenstein-Wertheim
7. Eleonore of Löwenstein-Wertheim-Rochefort
15. Maria Polyxena Khuen-Belasi-Lichtenberg
