= Basilica of Superga =

Catholic church in Turin, Italy

- Basilica di Superga
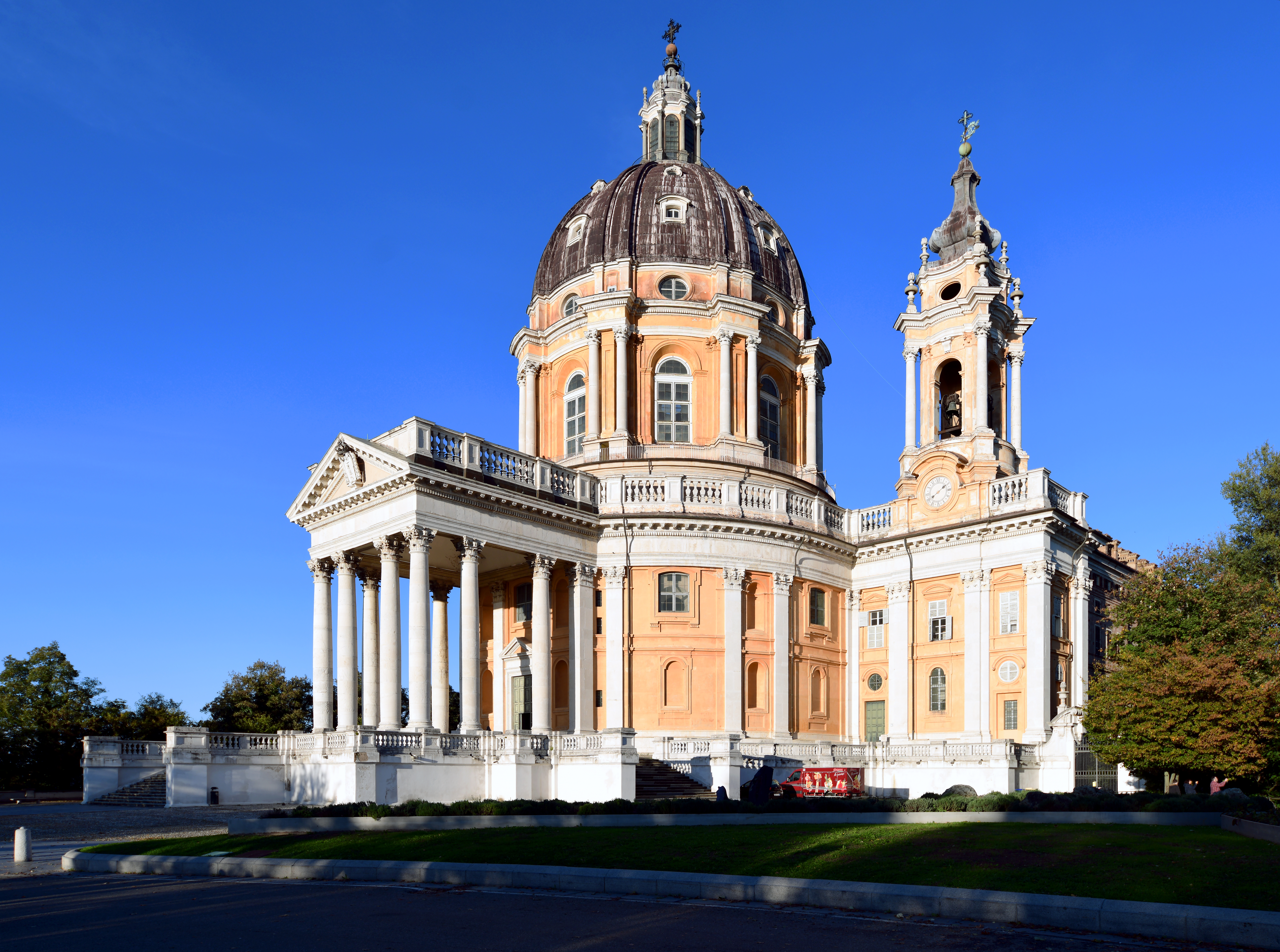
- The Basilica of Superga

- Map of Turin
- 45°04′51″N 7°46′03″E
- Country: Italy
- Denomination: Catholic Church
- Website: Official website

History
- Consecrated: 1 November 1731

Architecture
- Architect: Filippo Juvarra
- Style: Late baroque, Rococo
- Groundbreaking: 1717
- Completed: 1731

Administration
- Archdiocese: Turin

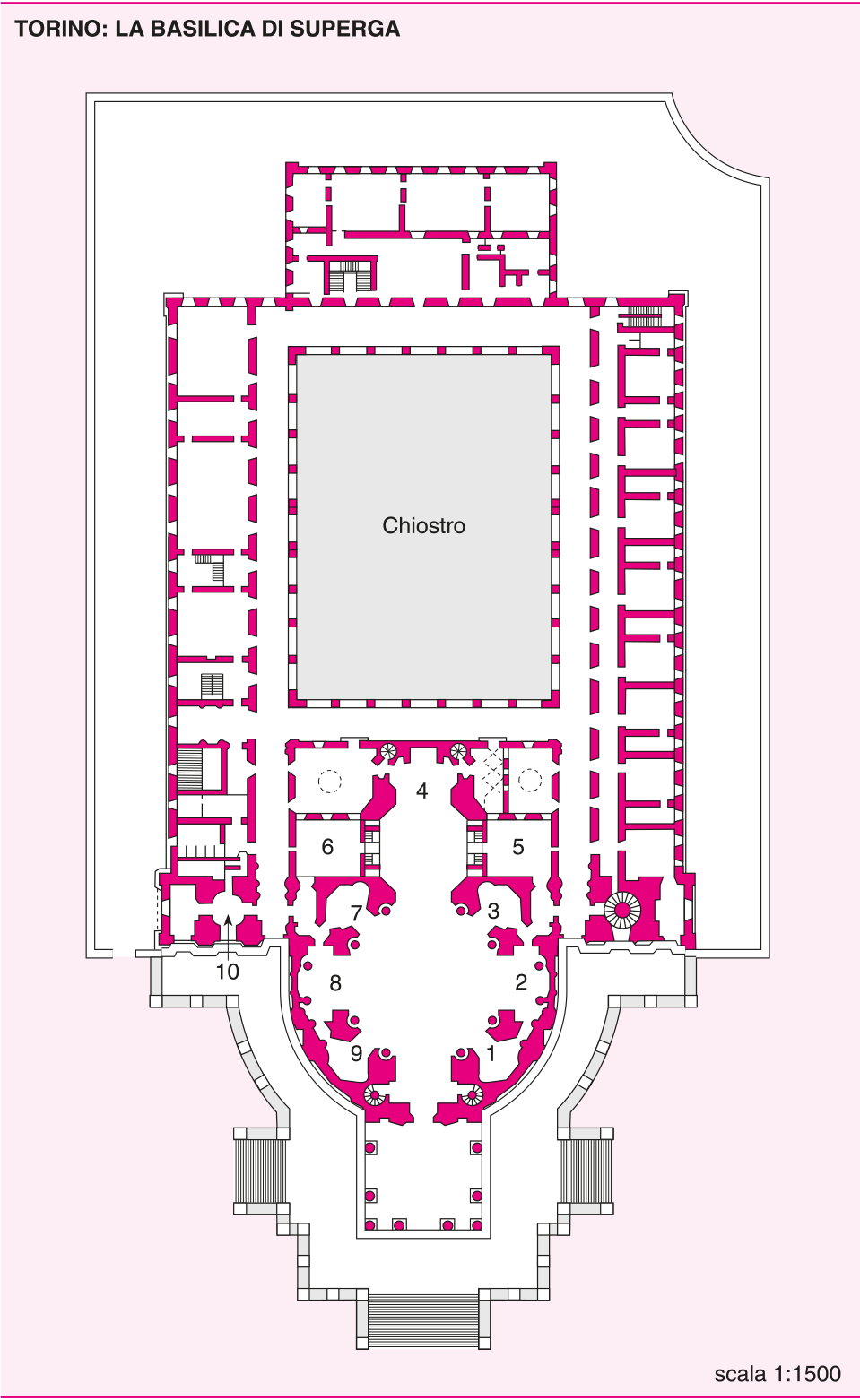
Plan

The Basilica of Superga (Italian: Basilica di Superga) is a hilltop Catholic basilica in Superga, in the vicinity of Turin, Italy.

== History ==
The church was built from 1717 to 1731 for Victor Amadeus II of Savoy, designed by Filippo Juvarra, at the top of the hill of Superga.

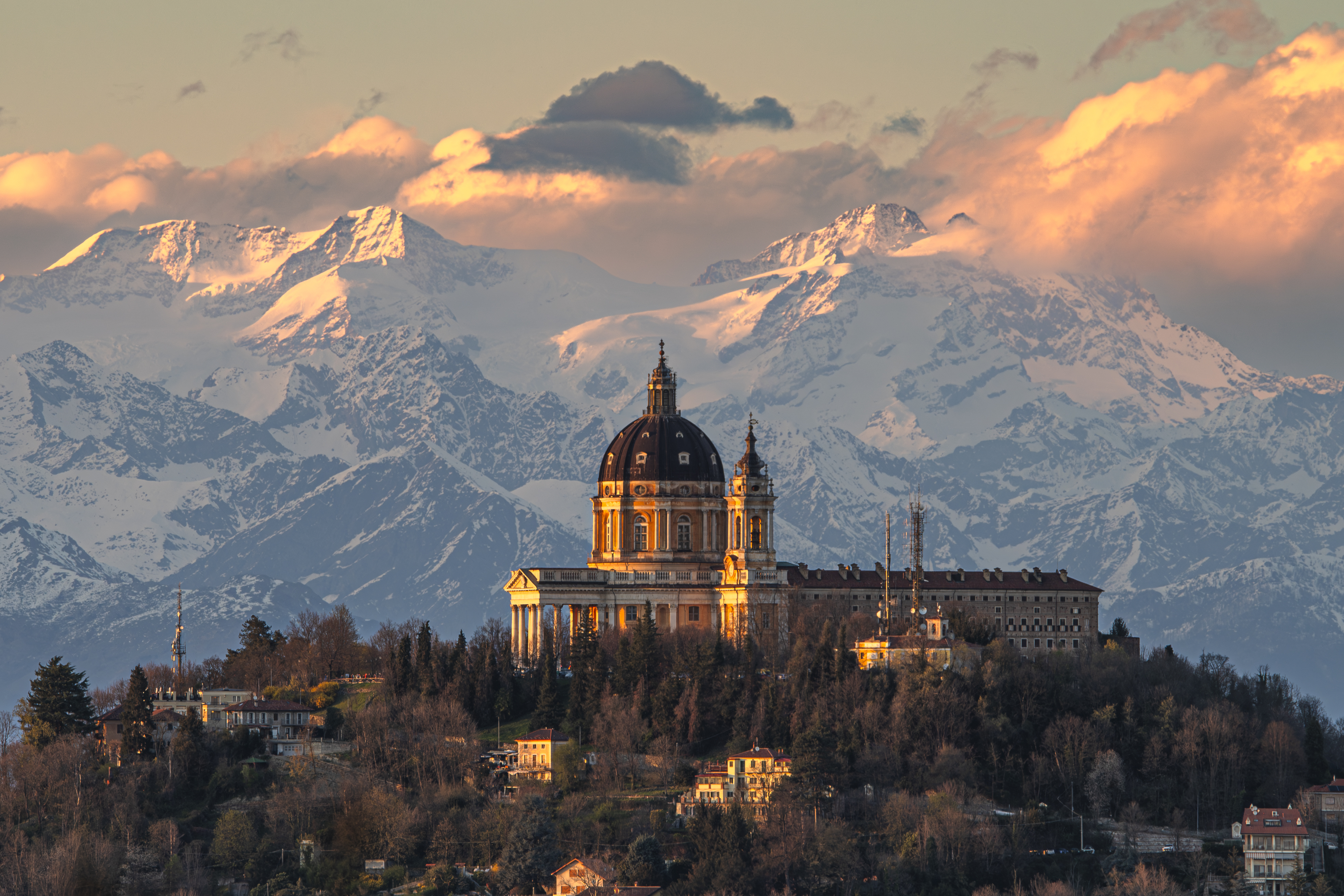
The basilica with the Monte Rosa massif in the background

This fulfilled a vow the duke (and future King of Sardinia) had made during the Battle of Turin, after defeating the besieging French army in the War of the Spanish Succession. The architect alluded to earlier styles while adding a baroque touch. The church contains the tombs of many princes and kings of the House of Savoy, including the Monument to Carlo Emanuele III (1733) by Ignazio Collino and his brother Filippo. Under the church are the tombs of the Savoy family, including most of its members, among them Charles Albert.

This church by Juvarra is considered late Baroque-Classicism. The dome was completed in 1726 and resembles some elements of Michelangelo's dome at St. Peter's Basilica. This is no coincidence, as Juvarra studied and worked in Rome for ten years prior to working in Turin. The temple front protrudes from a dome structure, citing the Pantheon. The temple front is larger than typical proportions because the Superga is set upon this hill. It is also believed that Victor Amadeus wanted the basilica to rest on this hill as a reminder of the power of the Savoy family, as well as to continue a line of sight to the existing Castle of Rivoli. Later, the Palazzina di caccia of Stupinigi completed the triangle among the three residences of Savoy.

The Royal Crypt of Superga is the burial place of the Savoy family.

The history of the church can be traced to 2 September 1706, when Duke Victor Amadeus II of Savoy and the Prince of Carignano, Eugene of Savoy climbed the hill to see Turin besieged by Franco-Spanish forces during the War of the Spanish Succession. Victor Amadeus, having knelt in front of an old prop, swore that, in case of victory, he would have a monument built to our Lady (the Virgin Mary). From dawn until the early hours of the afternoon of 7 September, the armies clashed in the fields at Jaya and Madonna di Campagna. Piedmontese armies achieved victory over the French. After Victor Amedeus was crowned king of Sicily, he entrusted the design of this building to Filippo Juvarra.

The rear supporting wall of the Basilica was the site of the Superga air disaster in 1949, which took the lives of the Grande Torino football team.

== Royal crypt ==
The royal crypt is the traditional burial place of members of the House of Savoy, successively Dukes of Savoy, Kings of Sardinia and Kings of Italy. Two kings of Italy, Victor Emmanuel II and Umberto I, have been interred in the Pantheon, Rome. The earlier generations of the House of Savoy, as well as the last king of Italy, Umberto II, are buried in Hautecombe Abbey, the ancestral burial site of the family in Savoy.

== See also ==
- 18th-century Western domes

== Sources ==
- Aston, Nigel (2012). "The Established Church". In Doyle, William (ed.). The Oxford Handbook of the Ancien Régime. Oxford University Press.
- Chadwick, Owen (1998). A History of the Popes, 1830-1914. Oxford University Press.
- Domenico, Roy Palmer (2002). Remaking Italy in the Twentieth Century. Rowman & Littlefield Publishers Inc.
- Storrs, Christopher (2004). War, Diplomacy and the Rise of Savoy, 1690–1720. Cambridge University Press.
- Wilson, Ellen Judy; Reill, Peter Hanns, eds. (2004). "Baroque style". Encyclopedia of the Enlightenment. Book Builders Incorp.
