= Clara Elisabeth of Manderscheid-Blankenheim =

- Born: 1631
- Died: 7 April 1688; Thorn
- Noble family: Manderscheid
- Father: John Arnold of Manderscheid-Blankenheim
- Mother: Antoinette Elisabeth of Manderscheid-Gerolstein

Clara Elisabeth of Manderscheid-Blankenheim (1631 – 7 April 1688) was canoness at Thorn Abbey and Essen Abbey and deaness at Elten Abbey. In Thorn, she is known today as "the sick lady" and she is better known than her sister Anna Salome, although the latter presided over Thorn Abbey for more than 40 years as abbess. In 1673, Clara Elizabeth donated a Loreto Chapel. A magnificent epitaph in the St. Michael Church, the former Abbey Church, in Thorn, commemorates her.

== Life ==
Clara Elisabeth of Manderscheid-Blankenheim suffered from disease most of her life. At times, she suffered from paralysis, convulsions and fevers. She would faint, or lose the ability to speak. For long periods, she did not tolerate any food other than milk. Nevertheless, she would care for other sick people. She would treat minor injuries herself, or give away medicine from her own pharmacy. Sometimes, as many as 50 people seeking help were waiting outside her house.

She experienced an improvement in her health on 13 July 1681, when she was blessed by the miracle healer Marco d'Aviano. He blessed her from Liege and healed her to the point that she could get up and walk a few steps and even attend mass in the abbey church. She could also participate in the procession to celebrate the consecration of the Lorate Chapel she had donated (the chapel had been consecrated on the day she had been miraculously cured). On 24 July, she travelled to nearby Roermond, where she visited Marco d'Aviano.

Her life story was published in 1693, in a booklet entitled Seraphischer Sternenhimmel, das ist: kurze Lebensgeschichte der Heiligen, Seligen und anderer Glieder des dritten Ordens des hl. Franz von Assisi, welche im Rufe der Heiligkeit verschieden ("Seraphic star-laden sky, that is: short life story of the saints, blessed and other members of the third order of St. Francis of Assisi with various Holy callings").

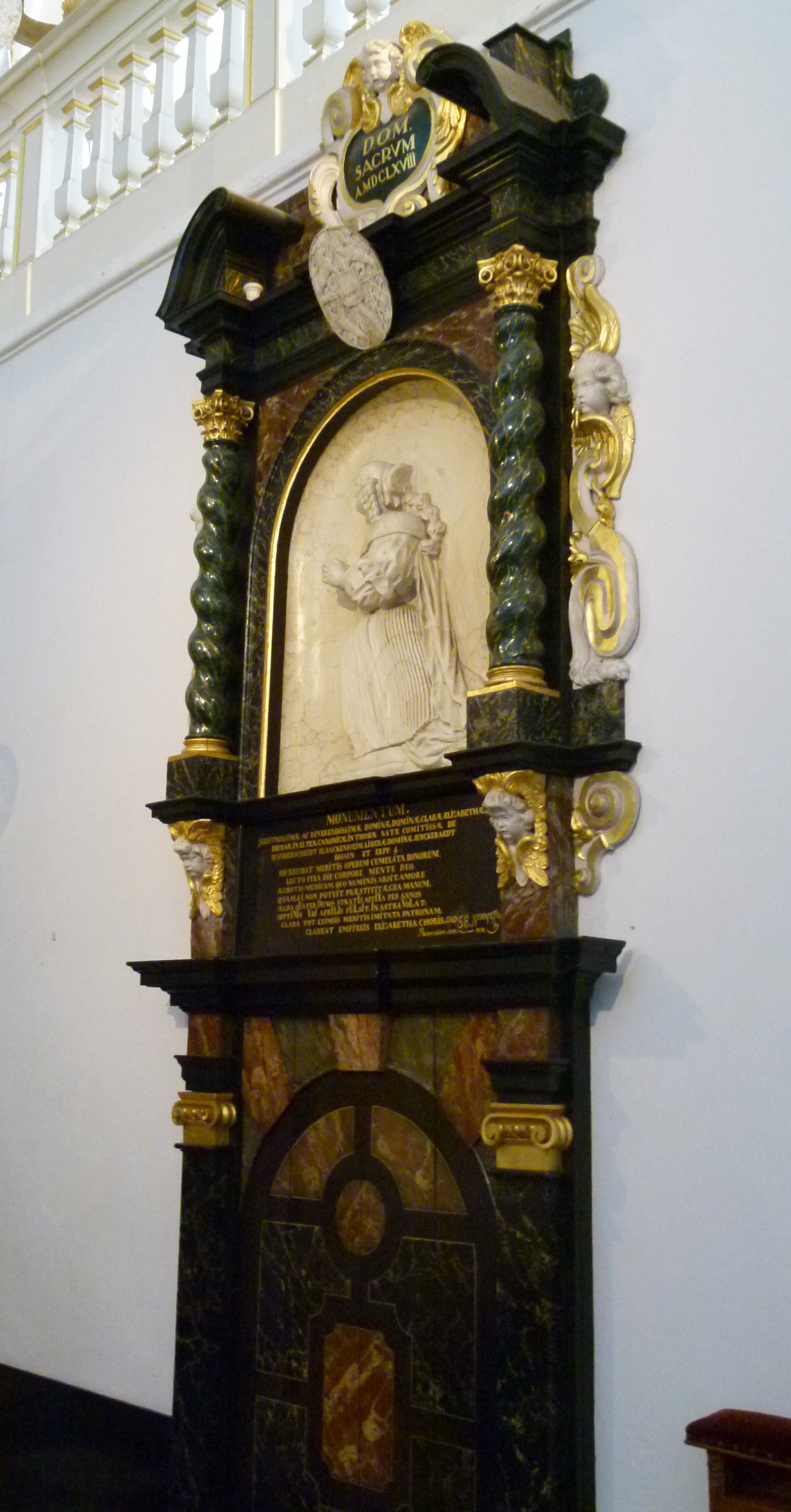
Epitaph Thorn abbey church

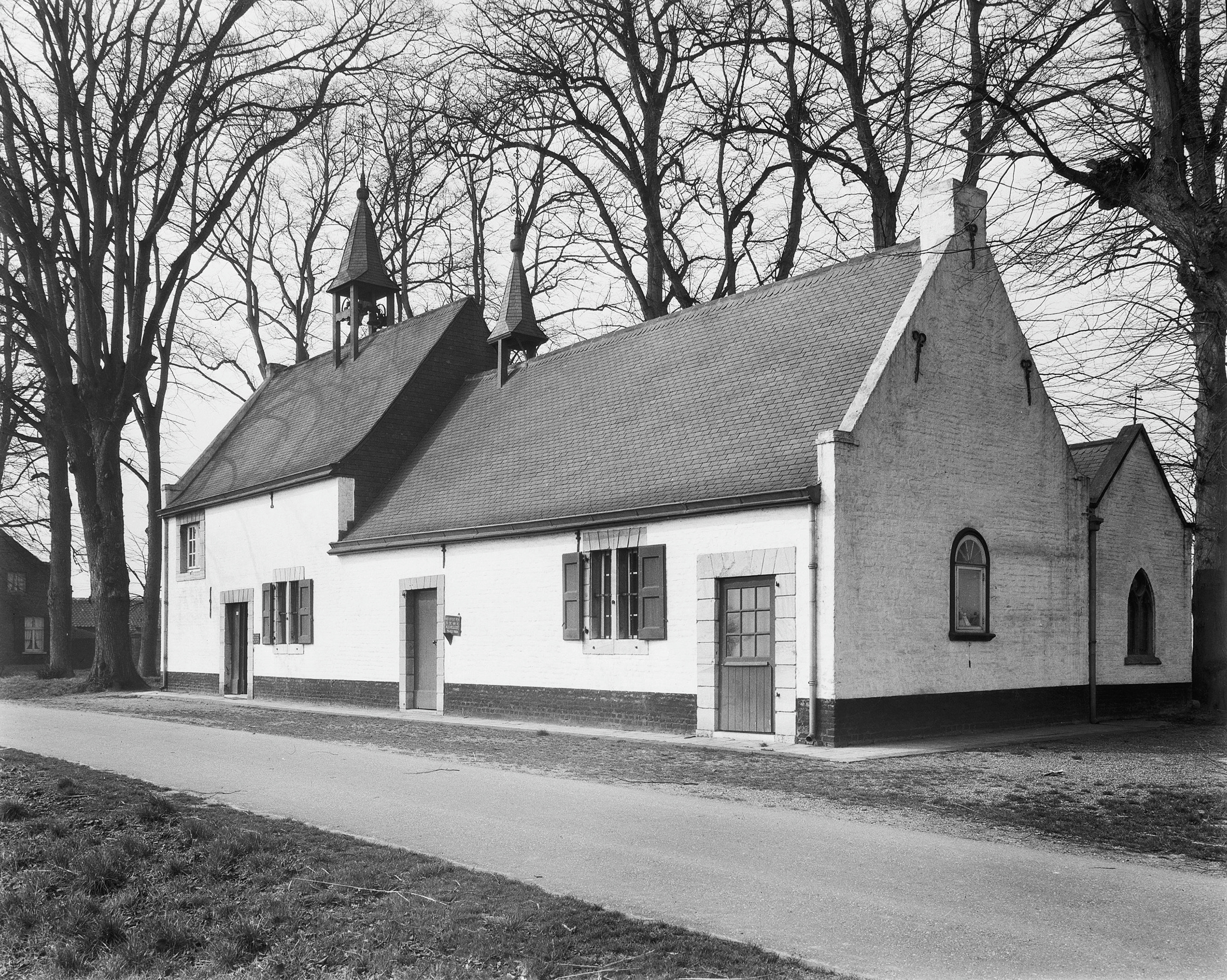
Loreto chapel, Thorn

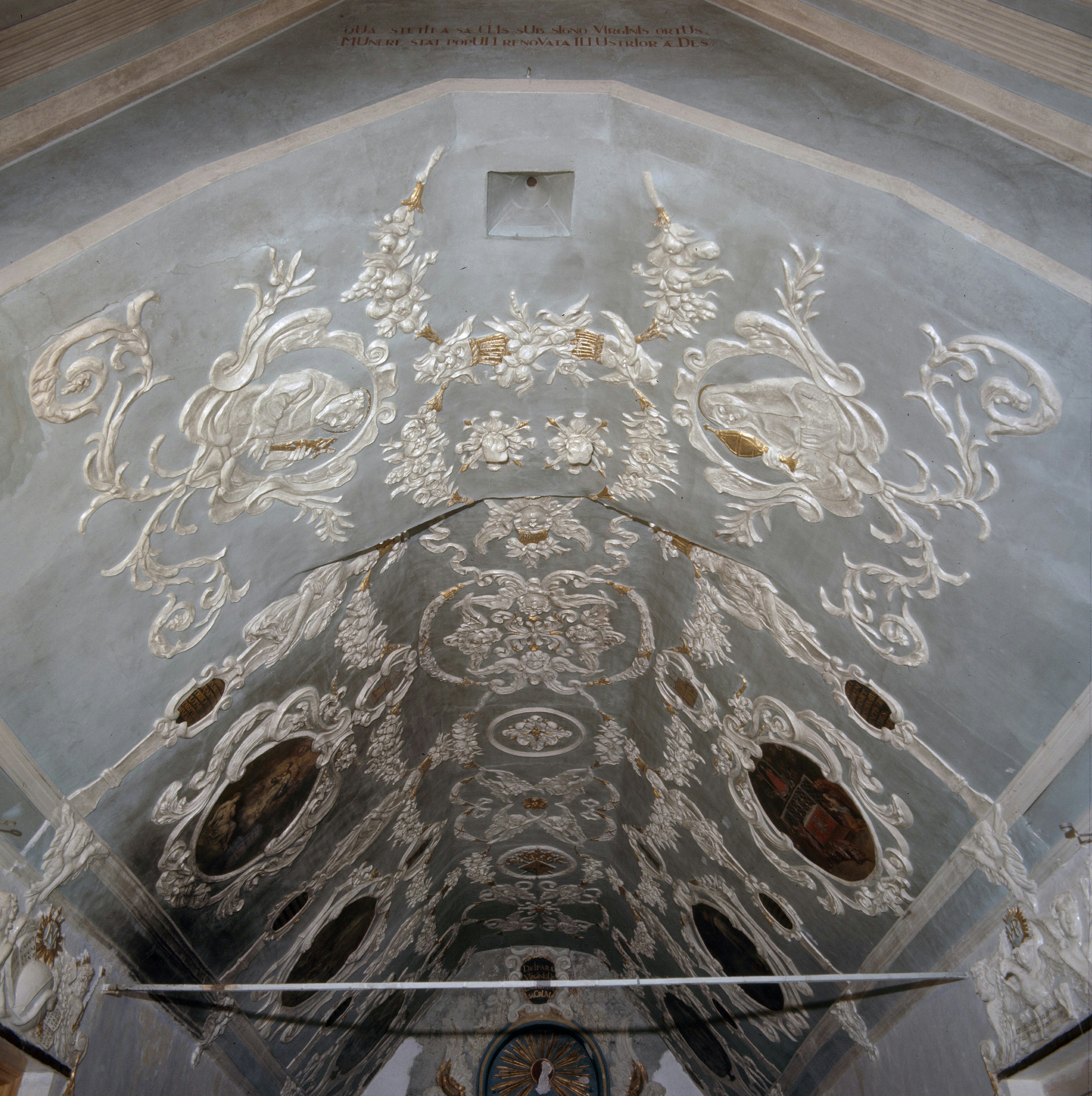
Ceiling Loreto chapel
