= Countess Palatine Francisca Christina of Sulzbach =

Abbess of Thorn and Essen (1696–1776)

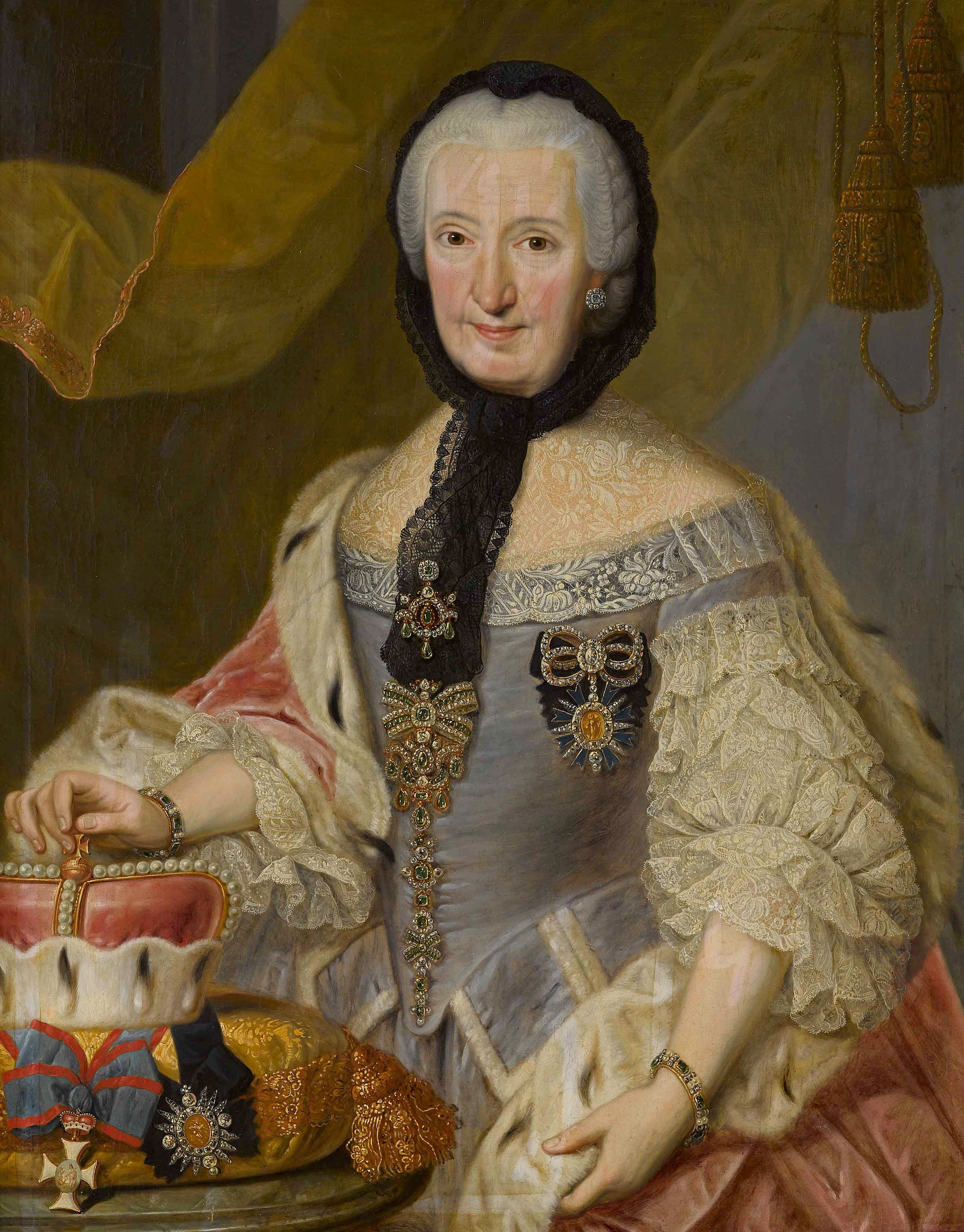
- Countess Palatine Francisca Christina of Sulzbach
- Born: 16 May 1696; Sulzbach
- Died: 16 July 1776 (aged 80); Essen
- Buried: Steele (now part of Essen)
- Noble family: House of Wittelsbach
- Father: Theodore Eustace, Count Palatine of Sulzbach
- Mother: Landgravine Maria Eleonore of Hesse-Rotenburg

Countess Palatine Francisca Christina of Sulzbach (16 May 1696 in Sulzbach – 16 July 1776 in Essen) was the Princess-abbess of Essen Abbey and Thorn Abbey. She led Essen Abbey from 1726 to 1776, the longest of any Essen abbess. Her tenure was marked by disputes between the Abbey and the city, which were caused by her counselors.

She founded the Princess Francisca Christina Foundation, which still maintains the orphanage she founded in Essen-Steele. Her father was Theodore Eustace, Count Palatine of Sulzbach and her mother was Landgravine Maria Eleonore of Hesse-Rotenburg.

== Life ==
=== Early life ===
Francisca Christina was born on 16 May 1696 as the daughter of Duke Theodore Eustace of Palatinate-Sulzbach and his wife Landgravine Maria Eleonore of Hesse-Rotenburg. She was the third child and second daughter. The Dukes Palatine of Sulzbach were a collateral branch of the Palatinate line of the House of Wittelsbach.

At the age of five, she got a prebendary in the Thorn Abbey, a secular abbey for high-born ladies, west of the Meuse river, at Roermond. Her aunt Eleonore of Löwenstein-Wertheim-Rochefort was abbess of Thorn and made Francisca Christina, her "much-loved cousin", her sole heir in 1706. In 1712, she presented her Aufschwörung (proof of her noble descent) to Essen Abbey. She received a prebendary there as well, subject to the condition that she was not allowed to vote on decisions of the Chapter as long as two of her sisters were also entitled to vote. The reason for this restriction was that only ten ladies were entitled to vote in the Chapter in Essen, and it was felt that giving the Palatinate-Sulzbach family three votes would give them too much influence. Nevertheless, Francisca Christina accepted her prebendary in Essen on 10 November 1712 and immediately took up residency in Essen, which was a condition for later being entitled to vote in the Chapter. She was released from the residency requirement in September 1713 and received the vote two years later, when her sister left Essen Abbey and joined a religious monastery. (Essen was a secular abbey; this meant that the collegiate ladies kept their own possessions and could leave whenever they wanted, for example, if they decided to marry).

Francisca Christina did not hold any office neither in Thorn nor in Essen, before she was elected abbess.

=== Abbess in Thorn ===
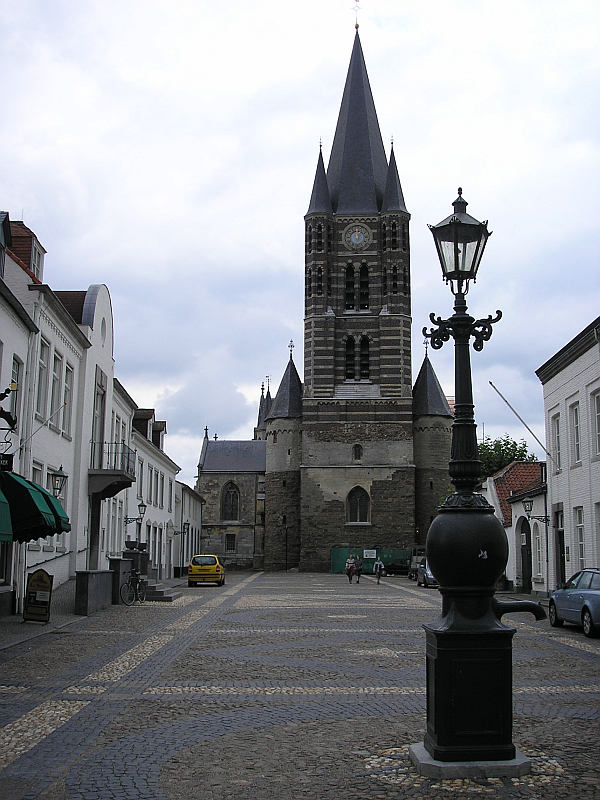
The Abbey of Thorn

Abbess Juliana Anna Helena of Manderscheid-Blankenheim of Thorn Abbey died on 12 January 1717. On 31 March 1717, Francisca Christina was elected as her successor. At 21 years, she was not really old enough to hold this office, so she had to obtain a papal dispensation. She had not been the preferred candidate of the chapter, but outside influences had been decisive in her election. Five candidates had expressed interest in the office:

- Anna Salome of Manderscheid-Kail-Falkenstein, wo was the Dean of Thorn,
- the Countess of Löwenstein, a collegiate lady resident in Thorn,
- Magdalena of Salm-Reiferscheid, another collegiate lady resident in Thorn,
- Francisca Christina herself, who was also a collegiate lady, but not entitled to vote
- Countess Anna Johannetta of Manderscheid-Blankenheim

Ten collegiate ladies and six canons were entitled to vote. Thorn was an imperial abbey, so the abbess was an Imperial Princess. The election thus allowed royal houses to increase their influence, by having supporters of relatives elected.

Already on 2 February 1717, a letter from Elector Palatine Charles III Philip arrived in Thorn, recommending the election of his relative Francisca Christina. Charles III Philip was a member of the Palatinate-Neuburg line of the House of Wittelsbach; his daughter Elisabeth Auguste married Francisca Christina's brother Joseph Charles (also in 1717) and seeing Francisca Christina elected would fit the power politics of the House of Wittelsbach. The chapter was initially opposed to this proposal, because Francisca Christina was less experienced than the other candidates. On 7 March, an envoy from the Elector arrived in Thorn, "... to make some proposals to the abbey's dignitaries with regards to the Serene Princess Christina of Sulzbach". The nature of these proposals is unknown, but they were so convincing that even a letter from Emperor Charles VI recommending another candidate, did not prevent the Wittelsbach candidate from being elected.

=== Abbess in Essen ===
On 15 October 1726 Francisca Christina was elected abbess in Essen. Her election in Essen was also significantly influenced by outside influences. Küppers-Braun has established that in this election the interests of several counts, in particular the Counts of Manderscheid-Blankenheim and the Count of Salm-Reifferscheid collided with the interests of the princely houses. The Dean of Essen, Anna Felicitas of Salm-Reifferscheid, played a pivotal rôle in this election. She had promised to vote for Francisca Christina, against the interests of her relatives. The Count of Manderscheid-Blankenheim offered the Count of Salm several prestigious benefices if the latter managed to persuade his sister to break that promise. Anna Felicitas, however, kept her promise and voted for Francisca Christina.

Francisca Christina was the candidate favoured by the imperial princes. They, too, tried to influence the vote. The Archbishop of Cologne, Clemens August of Bavaria, who was a member of the Bavaria_Munich line of the House of Wittelsbach and with whom the Palatinate Sulzbach family had good contacts because Francisca Christina's brother had been a canon at Cologne, sent an envoy with a letter of recommendation. Elector Charles III Philip sent two envoys, with a letter of recommendation and instructions to stay in Essen until after the election. The kingdom of Prussia which regarded itself as the protector of the Protestant city of Essen, spoke out in favour of Francisca Christina. The Prussian envoy, however, felt hampered by the envoys of the Catholic principalities. Prussia relied on the promise that Francisca Christina would grant the Protestant city freedom of religion. The population of Essen was less credulous, because the general chapter of the abbey had to deal with a complaint by the Catholic councils, who demanded satisfaction for insults to their quarters. To ensure Francisca Christina's election, the Palatinate sent a cannon with crew into the city.

With such massive support and also supported by a previously issued papal permission to exercise the office of abbess in two abbeys simultaneously, Francisca Christina was elected 20 votes from the 22 voters.

=== Princess-Abbess ===
==== Policies ====
During her election Francisca Christina had stayed in Sulzbach. When the newly elected abbess entered the city of Essen, a four-page brochure entitled Essendia Redeviva was published, in which it was alleged that during the reign of her predecessor Bernardine Sophia of East Frisia and Riedberg "nothing but hostility, distrust and disharmony had continually prevailed" and "the whole country had spent its days in melancholy, waiting in vain for redemption", until Francisca Christina took up office. Küppers-Braun points out that this brochure shows clear Jesuit influences. During Francisca Christina's reign of almost fifty years, Jesuits had considerable influence on the politics of the abbey. Her predecessor had fallen out with the order seven years earlier. Francisca Christina, however, brought them back as administrative experts. Her confessors, who exercised a strong influence on her, were Jesuits. The absolutist view on government of her advisors often clashed with the ancestral rights of the chapters of Thorn and Essen, which the latter fiercely defended. For example, there was a dispute over whether the abbess could decide the arrangement of prayers and processions alone, or did she need agreement with the chapter. Another dispute, which even led to a lawsuit before the Reichskammergericht in Wetzlar, was about whether the Abbess or her officialis had the right to inspect the fireplace in the private residences of the canons in Essen without prior consultation of the chapter. In Thorn, there were disputes over revenue and judicial issues.

Under Francisca Christina's rather nominal government, a new tax code, a mortgage code and a court order were promulgated. The Estates, who had a say in tax issues, were called only once during her reign. After a while, they began meeting in the house of the Provost, without having been summoned by the Abbess. In fact she, or rather, her advisors, tried to prevent these meetings.

The relationship between the Abbey and the City of Essen also suffered under the influence the Jesuits had on the abbess. Not only the Protestant citizens complained; the Catholics complained as well. In 1775, the collegiate ladies and the citizen together attempted to have Father Thomas Mantels SJ, Francisca Christina's Jesuit confessor, relieved of his religious leadership. Their motivation was that he had pursued the replacement of another Jesuit, who had been in charge of the St. John's parish. It was also alleged that he was responsible for the high tax burden and the unauthorized replacement of abbey officers. The witnesses all testified that Francisca Christina herself had done absolutely nothing wrong. One witness mentioned that things were alleged about her confessor which "no true Catholic could listen to without disgust". In about 1766, the papal Nuncio wrote this about Francisca Christina to his successor: "She is a pious Princess, full of faith, but she allows her confessor and her canons to celebrate one thousand abominations. Until recently, she had a Jesuit named Father Mantels, who ruled her with a stick, but he is now dead, and things are better.".

==== Princely household ====
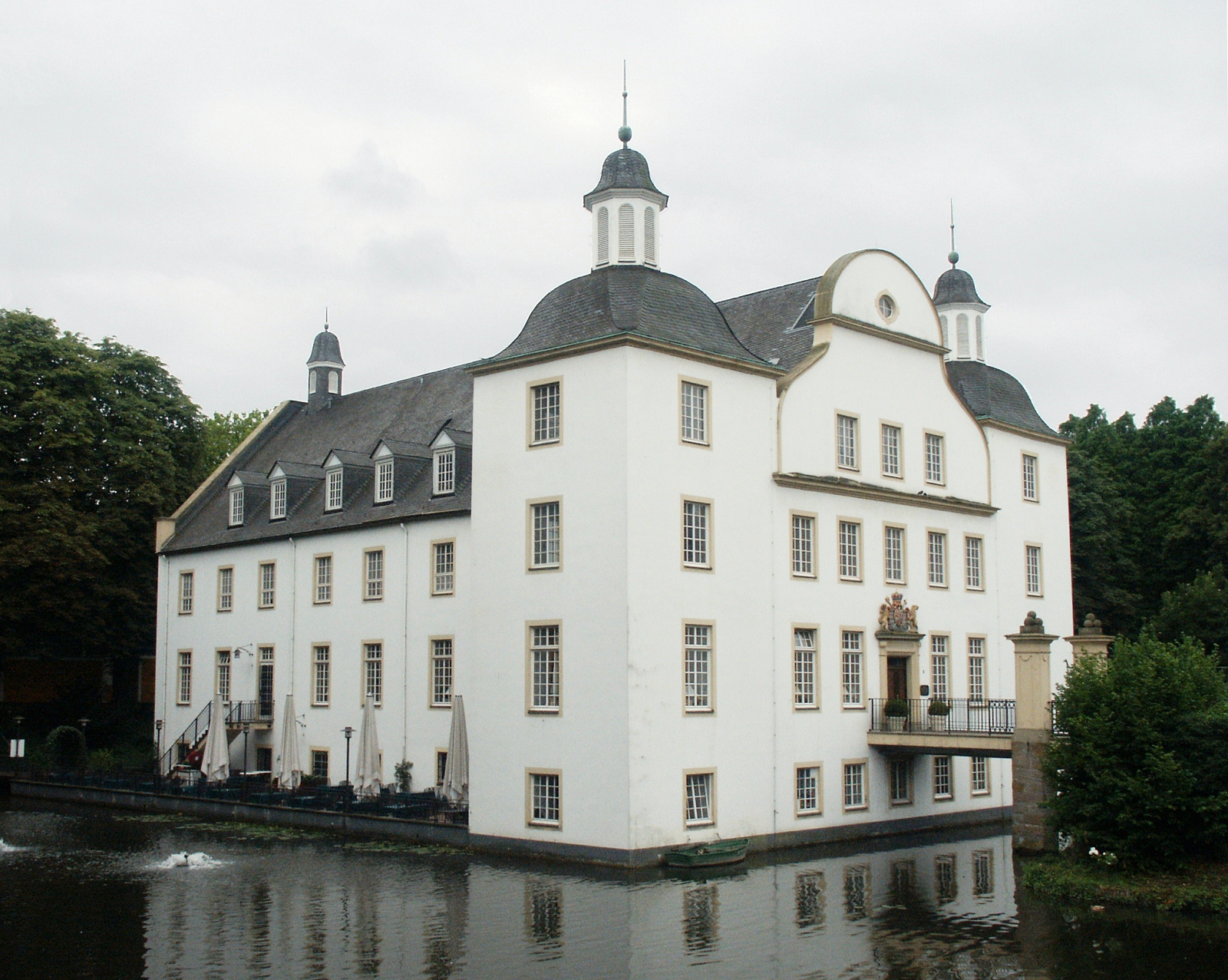
Borbeck Castle in the form that it received during Francisca Christina's reign

Francisca Christina was the daughter of an imperial prince and, after her election, an imperial princess in her own right. As such, she tried to surround herself with a princely court, to the extent that her principality provided sufficient means to do so. Ignatius Fortuna occupied a prominent position at her court. In the abbey building in Essen, he lived in the anteroom of the dining hall. In the mansion in Steele, he had a heated room on the same floor as the princess, a privilege that only he and the treasurer of the congregation and the abbess's personal priest had.

===== Borbeck Castle =====
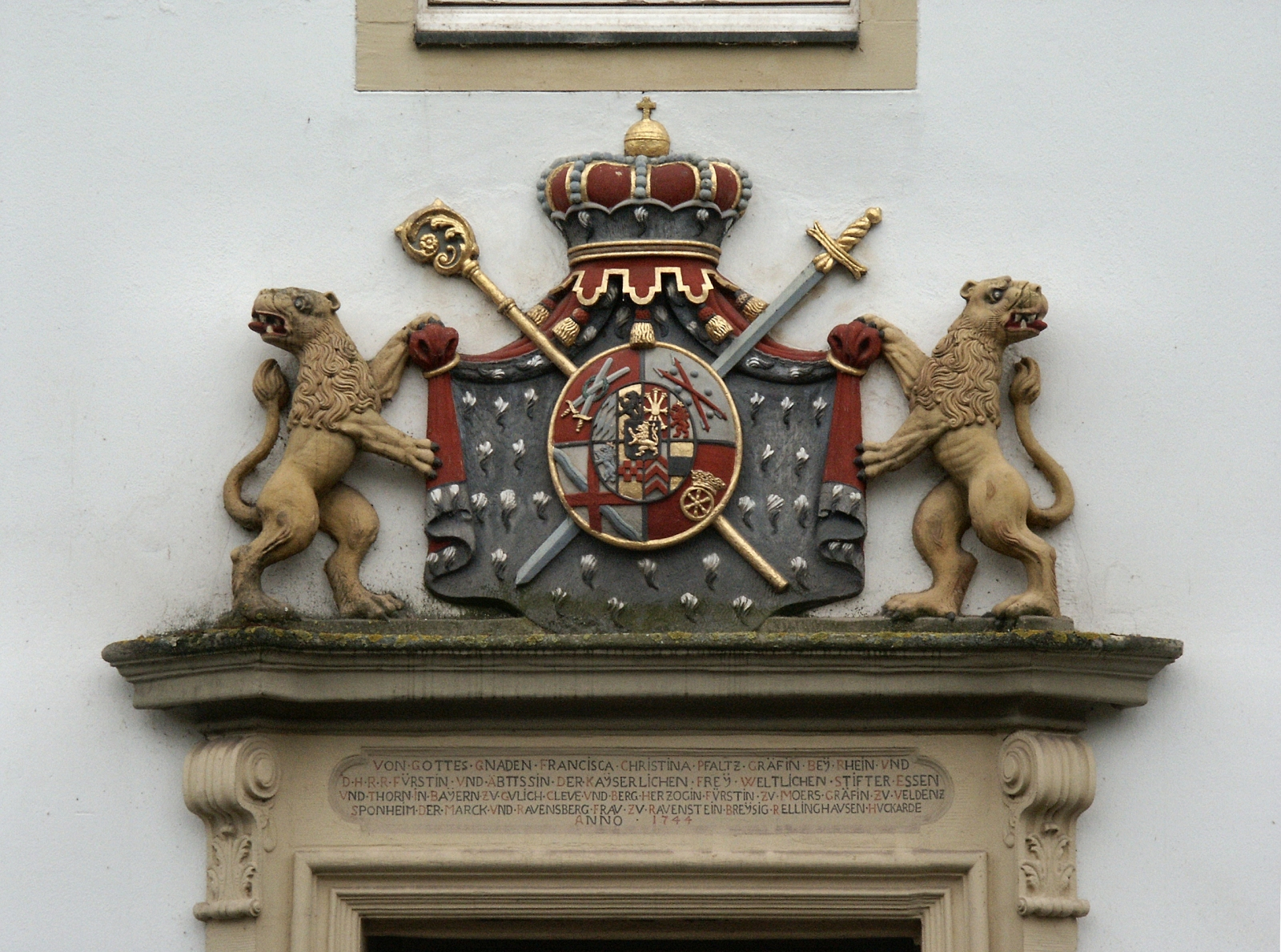
The arms of Countess Palatine Francisca Christina of Sulzbach above the entrance of Borbeck Castle

The residence of the princess-abbesses of Essen in the Essen abbey buildings were old and in a poor condition. The Baron of Duminique, who later organized the election of Francisca Christina's successor in 1776 as an envoy of the Saxon court, found himself forced, due to the moisture in the masonry, to ask the Jesuits next door to provide him accommodation. Like many of her predecessors, Francisca Christina spent most of her time at Borbeck Castle. She extended and renovated the castle between 1744 and 1762, resulting in the castle's present form. She had the building extended on the south side by the court architect from the Palatinate court in Düsseldorf. She put her coat of arms above the entrance door and created a 42-acre castle garden in the English garden style.

===== The orphanage =====
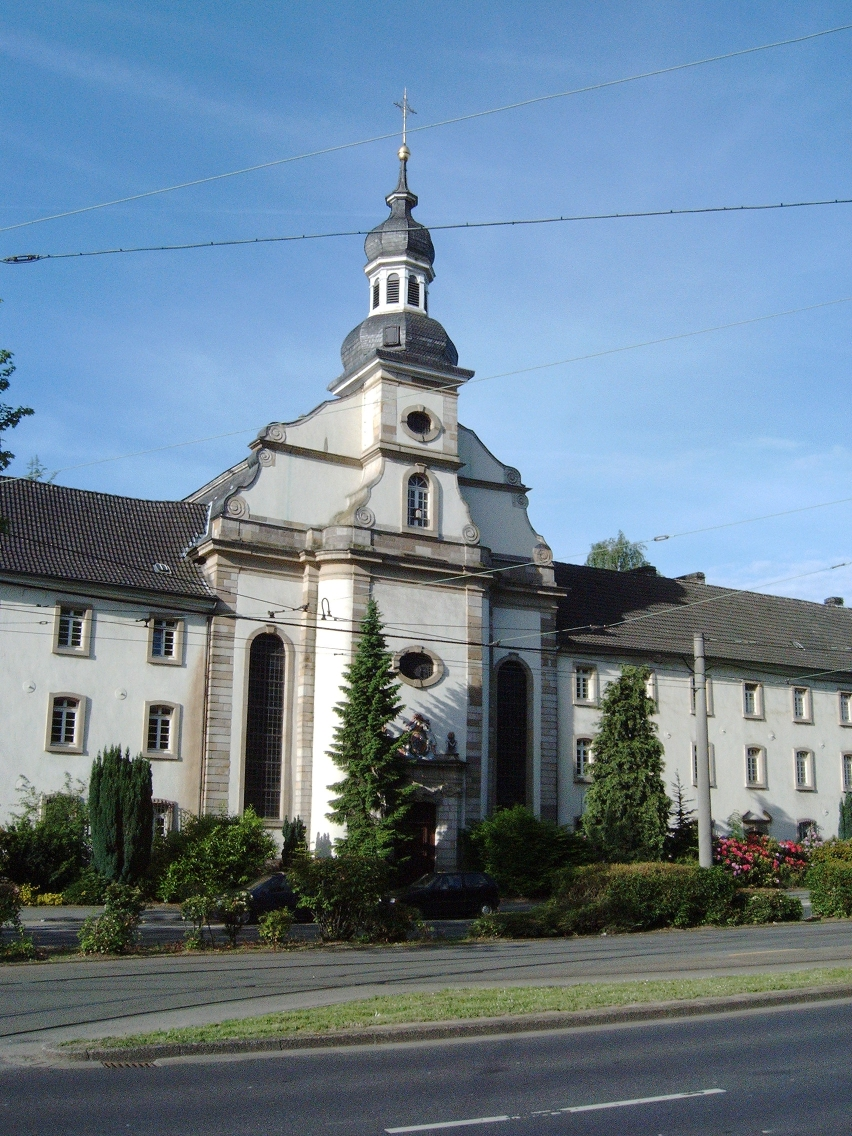
The orphanage of the Princess Francisca Christina Foundation

Francisca Christina's best-known deed was the foundation of her orphanage, which accepted its first children in 1769. The baroque buildings in Essen-Steele are now the only surviving secular buildings of Essen Abbey. Francisca Christina personally took part in furnishing the building and educating the orphans. All children were taught reading, writing and arithmetic. The boys also received a vocational training; the girls learned domestic and manual labour. They all received a handsome dowry when they left the institution. To secure the orphanage financially, she created the Princess Francisca Christina Foundation, which finances the orphanage to this day. There is some doubt, however, whether she has provided all of the Foundation's wealth out of her own resources. Küppers-Braun has demonstrated that the purchase price of the farms that provide the economic basis of the foundation, must have greatly exceeded her financial resources. After deducting the cost of housekeeping and her funeral, the surplus from the sale of her entire estate was only 318 Reichstaler, less than the wealth her thrifty Black servant Ignatius Fortuna left when he died. In fact, the orphanage served a triple function: apart from being an orphanage, it served as a residence for the abbess and above all, it served as a mission post of the Jesuits, who provided spiritual guidance to the foundation. The orphanage was constructed during a phase in which the Jesuits were criticized in many countries and even expelled from some, such as from Portugal in 1759. Presumably to avoid such criticism, the Princess Francisca Christina Foundation was designed as a secular foundation and its deeds and contracts were set up in a way that appealed to both the Jesuits and their critics. The chapel of the foundation has a special exemption: it was not part of any diocese, but subordinate directly to the pope. Any outside influence was barred. Pope Clement XIV suppressed the Jesuit order in 1773, four years after the orphanage was founded, but this had no effect on the orphanage. When in 1802 many religious institutions were secularized the Princess Francisca Christina Foundation was again not affected, because it was a secular foundation.

== Death and burial ==
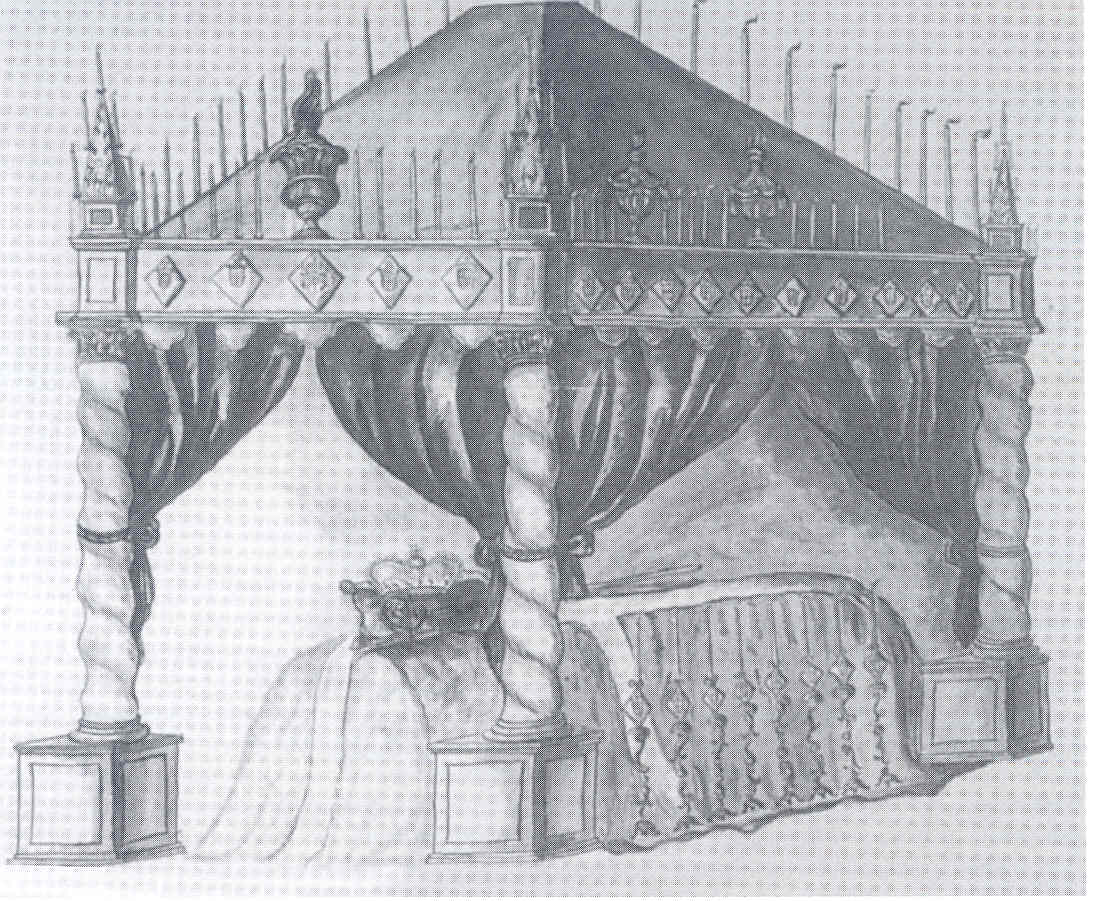
Canopy over the coffin of the Abbess

During the last years of her life, Francisca Christina was weak and frail and also plagued by diseases. However, she was not an easy patient: a report from 1775 complains that she did not regularly take her medications, ... although we three medical man, Leidenfrost, Bruning and Tuttman, adopt every possibility to provide her with tasty, and yet effective [Medicine]. The octogenarian abbess died on 16 July 1776 in Essen, shortly before her fifty-year jubilee. Her body was laid out in the audience hall of the abbey building under a magnificent canopy. On 18 July the coffin was transferred from Essen to Steele, which was still independent, on a hearse drawn by six horses covered in black. According to her last wishes, the princess was buried in the chapel of the orphanage she founded.

== Ancestry ==
Ancestors of Countess Palatine Francisca Christina of Sulzbach

16. Philip Louis, Count Palatine of Neuburg
8. Augustus, Count Palatine of Sulzbach
17. Anna of Cleves
4. Christian Augustus, Count Palatine of Sulzbach
18. John Adolf, Duke of Holstein-Gottorp
9. Hedwig of Holstein-Gottorp
19. Princess Augusta of Denmark
2. Theodore Eustace, Count Palatine of Sulzbach
20. John VI, Count of Nassau-Dillenburg
10. John VII, Count of Nassau-Siegen
21. Elisabeth of Leuchtenberg
5. Amalie of Nassau-Siegen
22. John II, Duke of Schleswig-Holstein-Sonderburg
11. Margaret of Schleswig-Holstein-Sonderburg
23. Elisabeth of Brunswick-Grubenhagen
1. Countess Palatine Francisca Christina of Sulzbach
24. Maurice, Landgrave of Hesse-Kassel
12. Ernest, Landgrave of Hesse-Rheinfels
25. Juliane of Nassau-Siegen
6. William, Landgrave of Hesse-Rotenburg
26. Philip Reinhard I, Count of Solms-Hohensolms
13. Maria Elenore of Solms-Hohensolms
27. Elisabeth of Wied
3. Maria Eleonore of Hesse-Rotenburg
28. John Theodore of Löwenstein-Wertheim-Rochefort
14. Ferdinand Karl, Count of Löwenstein-Wertheim-Rochefort
29. Josine of the Marck
7. Maria Anna Francisca of Löwenstein-Wertheim-Rochefort
30. Egon VIII of Fürstenberg-Heiligenberg
15. Anna Maria of Fürstenberg
31. Anna Maria of Hohenzollern-Hechingen

== References and sources ==
- Ute Küppers-Braun: Frauen des hohen Adels im kaiserlich-freiweltlichen Damenstift Essen (1605–1803), Aschendorffsche Verlagsbuchhandlung, Münster 1997, ISBN 3-402-06247-X.
- Ute Küppers-Braun: Macht in Frauenhand – 1000 Jahre Herrschaft adeliger Frauen in Essen, Klartext Verlag, Essen 2002, ISBN 3-89861-106-X.
- Ute Küppers-Braun: Fürstin-Äbtissin Franziska Christine von Pfalz-Sulzbach (1696–1776), in: Alfred Pothmann and Reimund Haas: Christen an der Ruhr, vol. 2, Verlag Peter Pomp, Bottrop / Essen, 2002, ISBN 3-89355-231-6.

== Footnotes ==
Countess Palatine Francisca Christina of Sulzbach House of Wittelsbach Born: 16 May 1696 Died: 17 July 1776
Preceded by Anna Juliana of Manderscheid-Blankenstein	Abbess of Thorn; 1717-1776	Succeeded by Maria Kunigunde of Saxony
Preceded by Bernhardine Sophia of East Frisia and Rietberg	Abbess of Essen; 1726–1776	Succeeded by Maria Kunigunde of Saxony
