= Convent of Bethany =

Former convent in Mechelen, Belgium

The Augustinian Convent of Bethany existed in Mechelen, Belgium, from 1421 to 1783. It belonged to the Congregation of Windesheim.

A notable occupant of the convent was Jacoba of Loon-Heinsberg, formerly the abbess of Thorn Abbey in what is now the Netherlands, who withdrew to Bethany in 1455. Her 1468 will indicates that a printing press was left to the convent.
