= Blankenheim =

Blankenheim may refer to:

== Places ==
- Blankenheim, North Rhine-Westphalia, a municipality in western Germany
- Blankenheim, Saxony-Anhalt, a municipality in eastern Germany
- Blankenheim Castle, a schloss above the village of Blankenheim in the Eifel mountains of Germany

== People ==
- Clara Elisabeth of Manderscheid-Blankenheim (1631–1688), canoness at Thorn Abbey and Essen Abbey, and deaness at Elten Abbey
- Leon Young de Blankenheim (1837?–1863), French Army soldier
- Frederick of Blankenheim (c. 1355–1423), bishop of Strasbourg as Friedrich II and bishop of Utrecht as Frederik III

=== Surname ===
- Ed Blankenheim (1934–2004), American civil rights activist and one of the original Freedom Riders
- Karoline von Manderscheid-Blankenheim (1768–1831), princess consort of Liechtenstein
- Toni Blankenheim (1921–2012), German operatic baritone
- Walter Blankenheim (1926–2007), German pianist and teacher
