= Maria Kunigunde of Saxony =

Princess and abbess (1740–1826)

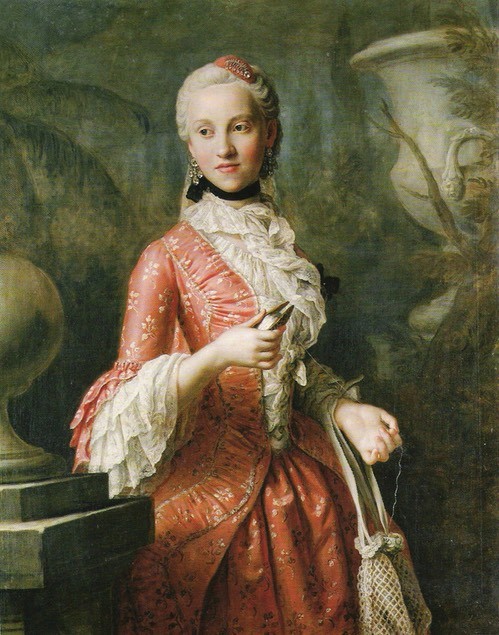
- Portrait of Princess Maria Kunigunde in court attire, by Pietro Rotari.
- Born: 10 November 1740; Warsaw, Poland
- Died: 8 April 1826 (aged 85); Dresden, Saxony
- Burial: Katholische Hofkirche
- House: Wettin
- Father: Augustus III of Poland
- Mother: Maria Josepha of Austria
- Religion: Roman Catholicism

Maria Kunigunde of Saxony (Maria Kunigunde Dorothea Hedwig Franziska Xaveria Florentina; 10 November 1740 in Warsaw – 8 April 1826 in Dresden) was Princess-Abbess of Essen and Thorn. She was a titular Princess of Poland, Lithuania and Saxony of the Albertine branch of the House of Wettin. She was a member of the Order of the Starry Cross and a collegiate lady in the abbey at Münsterbilzen.

== Life ==
=== Youth ===
She was the sixteenth and youngest child of King Augustus III of Poland (1696-1763), who was also Elector of Saxony as Frederick August II, and his wife Maria Josepha of Austria. Her father liked hunting, often went to the opera, kept an extensive art collection, and showed a great sense of family. However, he neglected his daily government duties and left them to his first ministers Count Heinrich von Brühl and Count Aleksander Józef Sułkowski. Her parents placed great emphasis on the education of all their children. Maria Kunigunde was taught Polish, Latin, French, English, philosophy, geography, religion, drawing, music and dance. As a young girl, she took part in operas and Singspiele performed at court in Dresden. She sang the title rôle in the opera Leucippo by Johann Adolph Hasse.

=== Candidate for marriage ===
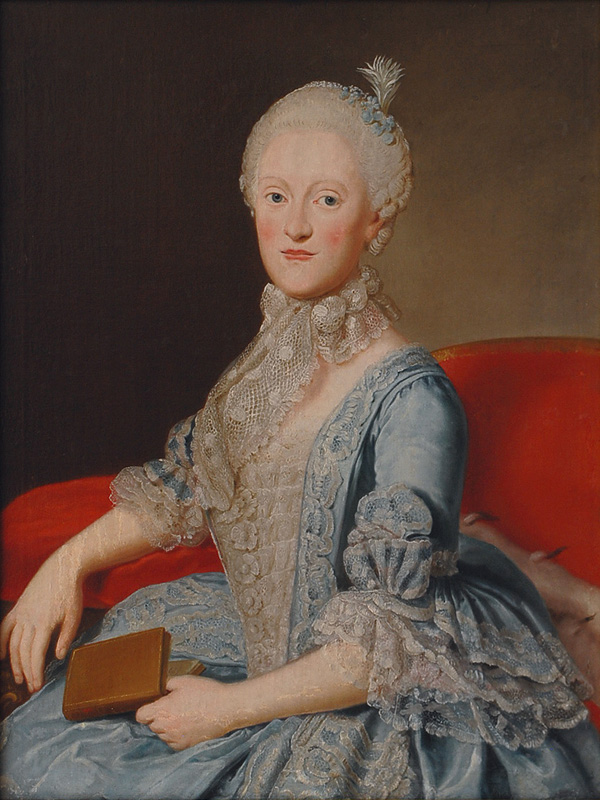
Princess Maria Kunigunde, c. 1760.

As a daughter of a ruling family, Maria Kunigunde was destined to marry a prince to strengthen the political relations of the House of Wettin. The candidate her father considered was Archduke Joseph of Austria, who later became Emperor as Joseph II. His beloved first wife, Princess Isabella of Parma, had died without producing an heir and his mother, Maria Theresa pressured him to remarry. Joseph considered marrying Isabella's younger sister Maria Louisa; however, she was already engaged to the Spanish heir apparent and later King Charles IV. Joseph asked Charles' father Charles III to break off this engagement, but Charles III refused. The Empress and her chancellor then asked him to choose a princess from Bavaria or Saxony. In 1764, he left Vienna to meet potential brides.

The Saxon court in Dresden favoured a marriage between Joseph and Maria Kunigunde, mainly because he might help the Saxons solve their financial difficulties. A "secret" dinner meeting was arranged between the two at Teplice in Bohemia. However, Maria Kunigunde hardly said a word during this meal and Joseph decided she was too timid to be his wife. He married her first cousin, Maria Josepha of Bavaria, whom he considered not very pretty, but confident. Maria Josepha's marriage was an unhappy one; Maria Kunigunde was spared this fate. However, the story of her failed secret meeting in Bohemia spread around the European courts, making it almost impossible to arrange a suitable marriage for her.

=== Election as abbess ===
==== Political background ====
One of the policy objectives of the House of Wettin was to increase their influence in the Lower Rhenish-Westphalian Circle in the northwestern part of the Holy Roman Empire. The court in Dresden demanded that Vienna make her princess-abbess of a prestigious ladies' abbey as compensation for the failed marriage plans. The two courts had some problems agreeing on a suitable abbey. Vienna proposed to make Maria Kunigude coadjutor and heir designate of Hradčany Abbey, which Empress Maria Theresa had founded in the Prague Castle. However, Dresden rejected this, because the abbey was a subject of the Bohemian Crown, which Dresden considered beneath the dignity of a Saxon princess. Dresden demanded she be given an immediate Abbey, which would make Maria Kunigunde an Imperial Princess. In 1766, they demanded that she be given the abbeys in Münsterbilsen, Essen and Thorn.

==== Münsterbilsen ====
The Saxon attempts to have Maria Kunigunde appointed as Abbess of Münsterbilsen failed in 1766. The incumbent, Antoinette of Eltz-Kempenich, was willing to abdicate in Maria Kunigunde's favour; however, the chapter fiercely resisted the imposition and insisted that all applicable procedures be followed. For example, Sophia of Stadion-Tannhausen requested proof of Maria Kunigunde's nobility, confirmed by two electors or imperial princes, and also that the next abbess reside at the Abbey — this was not an unusual requirement at ladies' abbeys, but it was unacceptable to the court in Dresden. The court interpreted the demand for proof of nobility as an insult. Only after a papal dispensation from the residence requirement was obtained, and Joseph II had impounded the Abbey's possessions, did the chapter concede and admitted Maria Kunigunde as a collegiate lady. At this point, the debate was no longer about appointing her abbess, but about preserving the dignity of the imperial court. The court had already decided that she would be installed as abbess in Essen and Thorn.

==== The election ====
In 1775 Maria Kunigunde was elected coadjutor of Essen and Thorn with the right to succeed, while her predecessor Francisca Christina of Sulzbach (1696-1776) was still alive. The election was unanimous, which was not surprising, considering that the courts in Vienna and Dresden paid 45000guilders to the canons and canonesses eligible to vote. Francisca Christina was then 79 years old and in failing health. She died on 16 July 1776 and Maria Kunigunde succeeded her on the same day. As princess abbess of an Imperial Free Abbey, she had a seat and a vote in the Imperial Diet and all the rights and obligations of an Imperial Princess (such as low justice, right of taxation, right of legislation, right of coinage, fealty and sovereign immunity.

=== Life as abbess ===
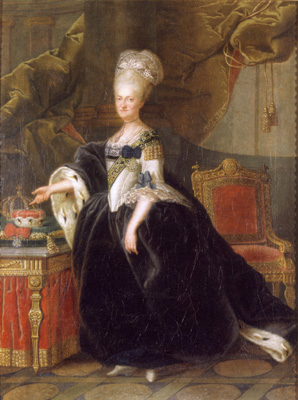
Maria Kunigunde as Princess-Abbess.

The abbey in Essen was highly regarded at the time of Maria Kunigunde's accession to the throne. However, it was hardly comparable to a court life like that of her father in Dresden, or her brother Wenceslas in Koblenz, where Maria Kunigunde spent most of her time after 1769. The main building of the abbey was so damp that the representative of the court in Dresden who came to oversee her election refused to spend the night in the building. The city of Essen was small and provincial; the streets were dangerous and cultural life was virtually non-existent. Maria Kunigunde delayed her official arrival in the city with pomp and circumstance until 9 October 1777 and left again the next day.

Maria Kunigunde was an influential figure at the court of her brother Wenceslas in Koblenz. He was the Elector of Trier and took almost no decisions without consulting her. She especially influenced his domestic policies. She rarely stayed at one of her abbeys and preferred to administer them from a distance. She often had conflicts with the chapters of her abbeys, because she was unaware of the abbey's customary rights. Her advisor Johann Jakob Schmitz tried to implement his own ideal of an enlightened absolutist state, and frequently collided with the rights of the chapter, the estates, or the city.

A judicial reform in 1781 ran smoothly. However, in 1786, the conflict escalated, when Maria Kunigunde promulgated a forestry and hunting regulation, and the collegiate ladies, who represented the estates, filed a suit against these regulations in the Reichskammergericht. Both sides realised that this court case would not resolve the underlying power struggle. In 1792, Johann Jakob Schmitz left Essen and accepted a professorship at the University of Bonn. After his departure, the abbess and the estates were willing to negotiate a compromise, which their representatives concluded after lengthy negotiations on 17 September 1794. They produced the principality's first written constitution, in which the powers of the abbess and the estates were delineated. This led to a better understanding between the abbess, who had not visited Essen since 1792, and the chapter.

In addition to this constitution and judicial reform, Maria Kunigunde legislated a ban on abortion and regulations for the activities of surgeons and midwives. She also founded a school for the daughters of the upper class and worked for compulsory education and a reduction of the number of public holidays. Her predecessor Francisca Christina had wasted the abbey's finances; when Maria Kunigunde tried to spend money, the chapter opposed her plans. Her plan to expand Borbeck Castle was vetoed by the estates. When she wanted to lend money for the construction of a chaussee connecting the Mark, which was held by Prussia, to Wesel, which was also Prussian, the estates vetoed that plan as well. She then used her own money to build the chaussee, and it significantly improved the road traffic in the area.

On 3 August 1802, Prussian troops occupied her territory and a process of secularisation began. She lost her worldly power, but retained her status as a clerical sovereign. In a treaty with the Kingdom of Prussia, she was awarded an annual stipend of 6500 Thaler from the revenues of the abbey for the rest of her life.

=== The businesswoman ===
Princess Maria Kunigunde of Saxony also demonstrated an unusual business sense, considering her background. After the estates had refused to make funds available for the construction of a chaussee from Wesel to the Mark, she took out a personal loan and constructed the toll road across her principality as a private entrepreneur. Her road brought her an annual income of 1700 Thalers. Since it was a private company, it was not affected when the abbey was secularised. In 1803, she sold the road to Prussia, which wanted to own this important road in its newly acquired territory, for 45000Thalers.

She can also be regarded as a pioneer of heavy industry in the Ruhr area. Bog iron could be found close to the surface in the carr south of the Emscher river. The importance of this find was realised in the mid-18th century and the first ironworks were being constructed in the area. Maria Kunigunde participated in several ironworks as a private investor; for example in 1787, she purchased shares in the Gut Hoffnung (Good hope) ironworks. In 1789, she founded a company which on 23 January 1791 received permission to operate the Neue Essen (New forges) ironworks. In 1796, she purchased the St. Antony ironworks in Oberhausen. She invited the entrepreneur Gottlob Jacobi from Koblenz to come to Essen; in 1799, he became her co-shareholder. Since these ironworks were private companies, they were not affected by the secularisation. On 24 May 1805, she sold her shares for 23800Thaler to Franz Haniel. Haniel and his brothers also purchased the Gute Hoffnung works from her brother-in-law Heinrich Arnold Huyssen and founded the Gutehoffnungshütte conglomerate.

=== Death ===
Thorn Abbey was mediatised in 1795; Essen in 1802. After this, Maria Kunigunde continued to live in the company of her brother Wenceslas, mostly in Oberdorf in Bavaria. When he died in 1812, she left Oberdorf before his funeral and returned to Dresden, where she stayed with her nephew Frederick Augustus.

She died in Dresden on 8 April 1826. Three days later, she was buried in the new crypt of the Cathedral of the Holy Trinity. Maria Kunigunde was the last of her fifteen siblings to die. She had written her last will and testament in 1821; it was rediscovered in the Saxon state archives in Dresden in 2001. In her will, she made it clear that, although she had not visited Essen after 1792, she was still interested in the wellbeing of her former principality and her staff. Many court officials received bequests, from her Hofmeister von Asbeck and his secretary down to the cook and the laundry lady, her personal physician Georg Brüning, her coachmen and outriders. Her nephew had to pay these bequests using "good money".

== Ancestry ==
Ancestors of Maria Kunigunde of Saxony

8. John George III, Elector of Saxony
4. Augustus II of Poland
9. Anna Sophie of Denmark
2. Augustus III of Poland
10. Christian Ernst, Margrave of Brandenburg-Bayreuth
5. Christiane Eberhardine of Bayreuth
11. Sophie Louise of Württemberg
1. Maria Kunigunde of Saxony
12. Leopold I, Holy Roman Emperor
6. Joseph I, Holy Roman Emperor
13. Eleonore Magdalene of Neuburg
3. Maria Josepha of Austria
14. John Frederick, Duke of Brunswick-Calenberg
7. Wilhelmine Amalie of Brunswick
15. Benedicta Henrietta of the Palatinate

== See also ==
- Ignatius Fortuna

Maria Kunigunde of Saxony House of Wettin Born: 10 November 1740 Died: 8 April 1826
| Preceded by Francisca Christina of Sulzbach | Abbess of Thorn; 1776-1795 | Abbey mediatized by France |
| Preceded by Francisca Christina of Sulzbach | Abbess of Essen; 1776-1802 | Abbey mediatized by Prussia |
