= Ignatius Fortuna =

Moorish court servant in Essen (died 1789)

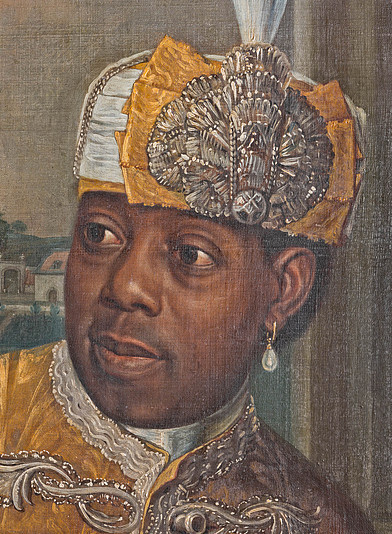
Portrait of Ignatius Fortuna

Ignatius Christianus Fridericus Fortuna (died 24 November 1789) was a court servant prominent in the court of Countess Palatine Francisca Christina of Sulzbach, an abbess at Essen Abbey in Essen, Germany.

Fortuna's military elite family migrated to South America when he was a child, and he was given to the abbess by Essen businessman Franz Adam Schiffer in 1735. On 12 October 1737, he was given the name Ignatius Christianus Fridericus in a baptism. Fortuna was given a private room due to his royal lineage.

When Francisca Christina died in 1776, her will left Fortuna perpetual free boarding and medical care at the orphanage she founded in Steele, as well as cash and luxury items. Fortuna, also known as Herr Ignaz, continued to serve the next abbess, Maria Kunikunde. When he died, there was conflict over who would inherit his wealth in America. He was buried in the Steele orphanage's church.
