= Jacoba of Loon-Heinsberg =

Jacoba of Loon-Heinsberg (died after 1468), was a noble woman from the Low Countries who was the abbess of Thorn Abbey from 1446 to 1454. She was the daughter of John II of Loon and her half-brother, John of Heinsberg, was bishop of the Prince-Bishopric of Liège. She withdrew to the Convent of Bethany in Mechelen in 1455; her 1468 will indicates she left a printing press to the convent.

== Life ==
The abbey chronicle praises her piety and her love of scripture. She was known to meditate especially on the Hours of the Passion, which she apparently knew about from the work of John of Ruusbroec, some of whose works she possessed in manuscript; she copied Ruusbroec's text as often as she could, and when she fell ill had others copy it for her. Wybren Scheepsma posits that she likely read Ruusbroec's Vanden twaelf beghinen ("The twelve beguines", ca. 1365), part of which "constitutes a sort of breviary of the Passion", the last day of Christ organized by the eight liturgical hours. Heinsberg, according to Scheepsma, may well have been responsible for the extension of the eight liturgical hours into twenty-four clock hours. Scheepsma further posits that the Bethany practice of copying and meditating was representative of the "spiritual exercises" of the Congregation of Windesheim; both Bethany and Windesheim belonged to that Augustinian congregation and received nuns from the "mother convent" in Diepenveen.
