= Anna Salome of Manderscheid-Blankenheim =

Abbess from 1648 to 1691

- Born: 12 December 1628
- Died: 15 March 1691 (aged 62)
- Noble family: Manderscheid
- Father: John Arnold of Manderscheid-Blankenheim
- Mother: Antoinette Elisabeth of Manderscheid-Gerolstein

Anna Salome of Manderscheid-Blankenheim (12 December 1628 – 15 March 1691) was Abbess of Thorn Abbey from 1648 to 1688, and the abbess of Essen Abbey from 1688 until her death.

== Life ==
Anna was a daughter of Count John Arnold of Manderscheid-Blankenheim (1605–1644) and his wife, Countess Antoinette Elisabeth of Manderscheid-Gerolstein (1608–1650). In 1640, Anna Salome and her three years younger sister Clara Elisabeth of Manderscheid-Blankenheim, received a prebend in Thorn Abbey and a few years later, one from Essen as well. Only eight years after her entry into Thorn Abbey, she was elected abbess at age 20. This was partly due to the fact that the Manderscheid and related families held a majority of the prebends, and also to Anna Salome's personal influence and ability.

She was highly educated and when she died, she left a private library of over one hundred books. The catalogue includes books on political, legal, geographical, historical subjects and even on medical instruments. Anna Salome ruled her abbeys herself, and even wrote legal briefs for her abbey in Essen.
