= Josina Walburgis of Löwenstein-Rochefort =

Josina Walburgis van Löwenstein-Wertheim-Rochefort
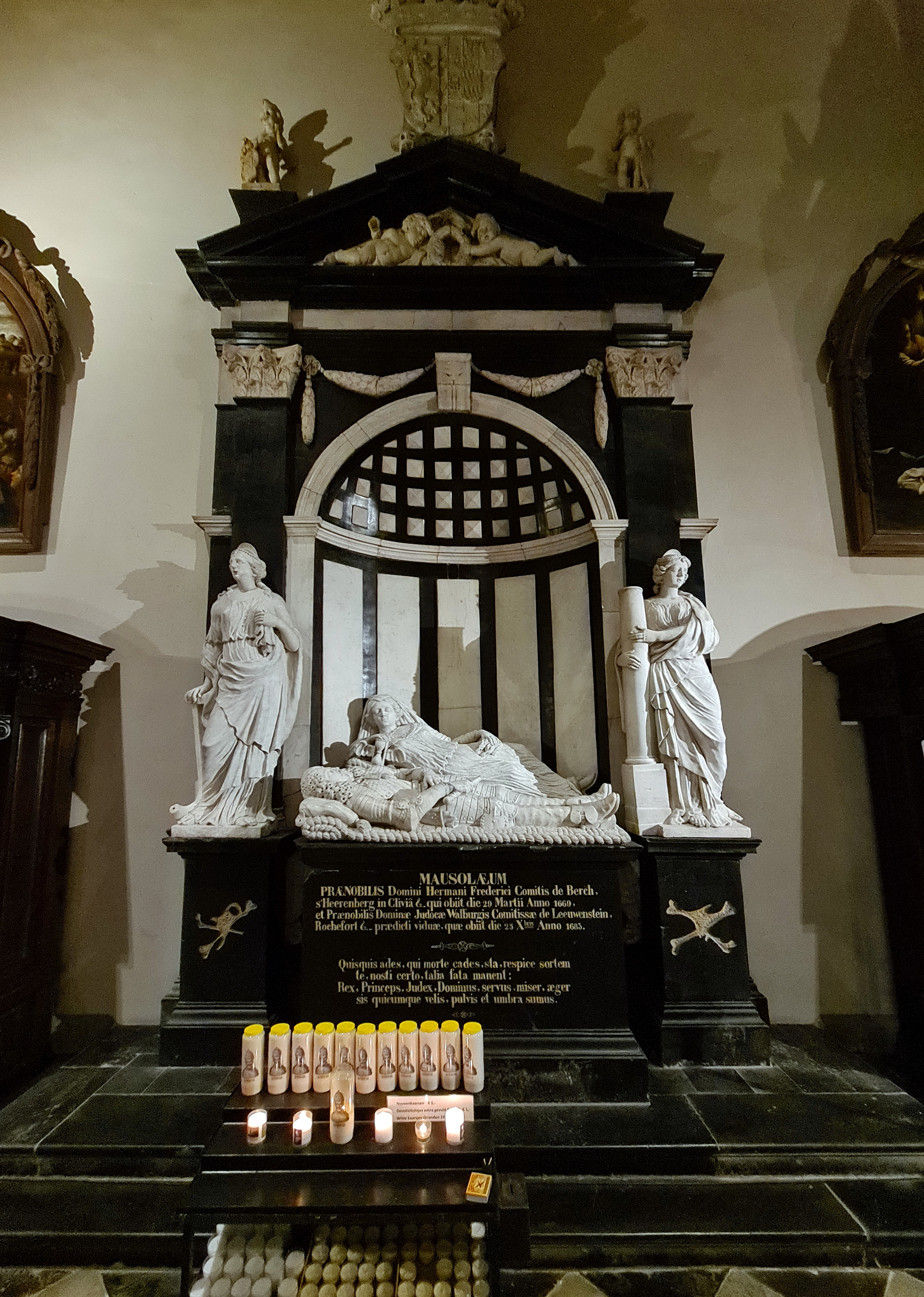
- Grave monument of Herman Frederick van de Bergh and Josina Walburgis van Löwenstein-Wertheim-Rochefort
- Born: 1615; Rochefort
- Died: December 25, 1683 (aged 67–68); Maastricht

Josina Walburgis van Löwenstein-Wertheim-Rochefort (1615–1683) was sovereign Princess Abbess of Thorn Abbey from 1631 until 1632.

She was born to count Johann Dietrich von Löwenstein-Wertheim-Rochefort (1585-1644) and Josina de la Marck (1583-1626) and was placed in the abbey by her father. Thorn had been ruled by her two maternal aunts in succession (Anna von der Marck and Josina II von der Marck) and she was elected Princess abbess by the will of her father in 1631.

The following year, she was the subject of a great scandal when she secretly married count Herman Frederik van den Bergh (1605-1669), son of Count Hendrik van den Bergh, and was deposed from her office: she was locked up by her father in another convent, but managed to escape and join her spouse in 1636. The couple lived in Berlicum or Castle Walburg in Ohé en Laak. The couple also stayed regularly in Maastricht or Aachen.

She is best known today for her extraordinary grave monument designed in 1685 by Johannes Bossier, which was originally installed in the Dominican church of Maastricht (today a book store). After the French occupation disbanded the monasteries, the most treasured contents of that church, including the grave monument of the Count and Countess Van den Bergh, were re-installed in 1805 in the Basilica of Saint Servatius in Maastricht.

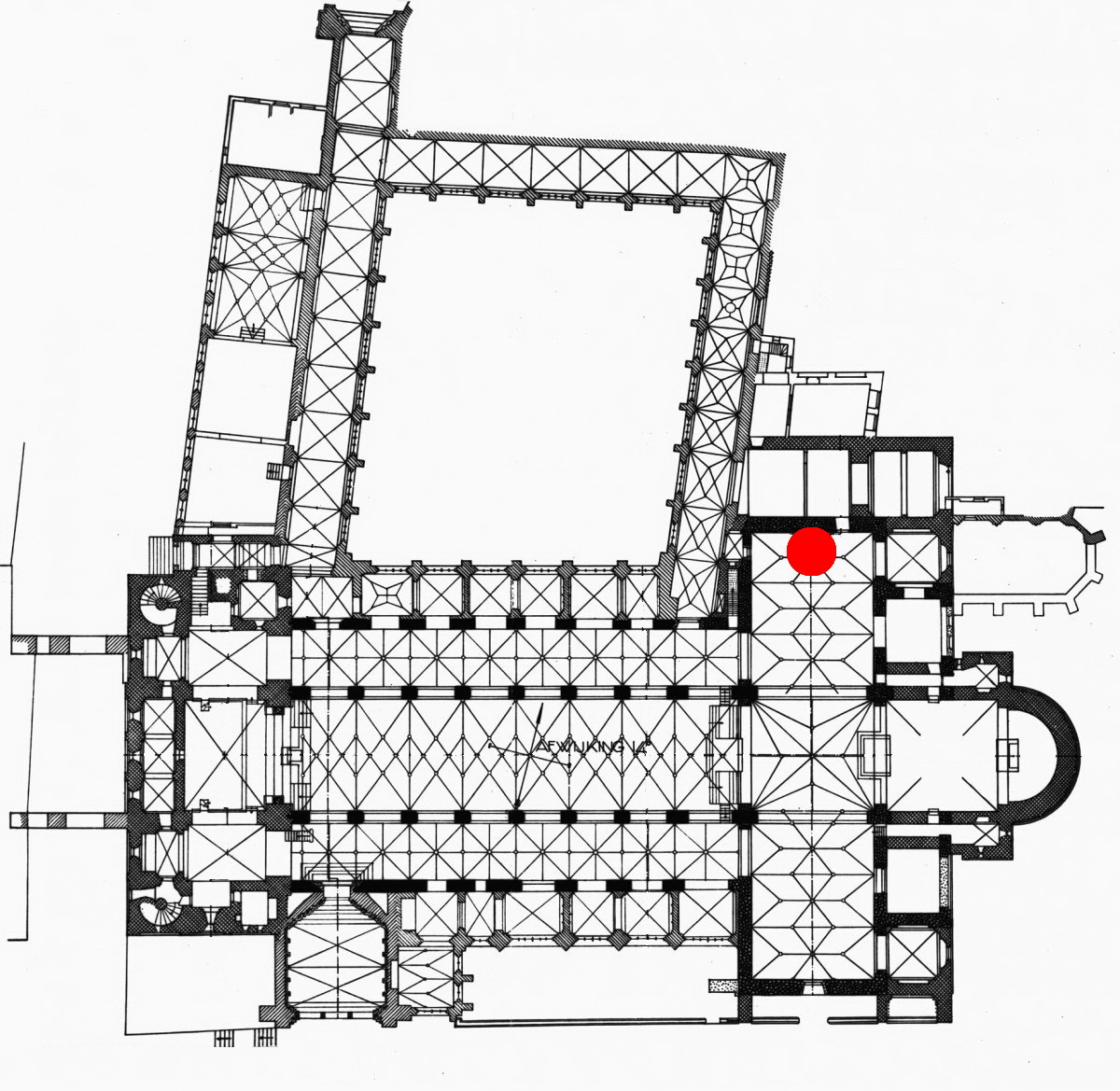
location of the grave monument of the Count and Countess Van den Bergh

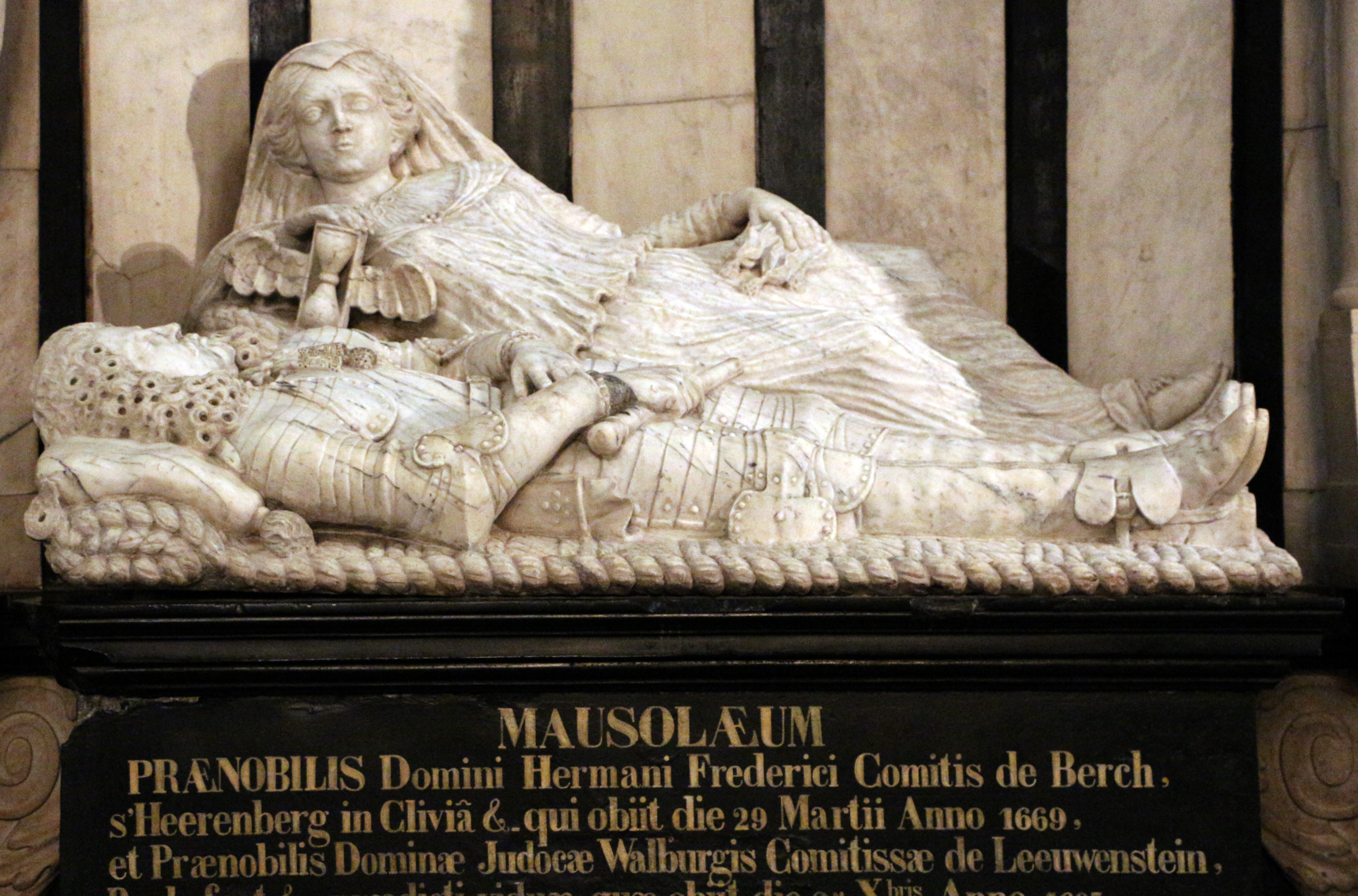
The alabaster effigy of Josina watches over the sleeping body of her husband Herman Frederik
