= Eva of Isenburg =

Sovereign Princess-Abbess of Thorn Abbey

Eva von Isenburg (died 1531) was sovereign Princess-Abbess of Thorn Abbey from 1486 until 1531.

She was born to Gerlach II von Isenburg-Grenzau and Hildgard von Sirck of Meinsberg and Frauenberg. She was elected to succeed Gertrudis de Sombreffe as ruling princess abbess. From 1486 until 1502, she was in conflict with Amalia van Rennenberg, who claimed the right to her office. She was supported by Maximilian I, Holy Roman Emperor and Amalia by her brother count Willem van Rennenberg, who attacked the realm, which was defended by the emperor in 1494 and 1499. The feud was terminated in 1502, when Eva was acknowledged as lawful abbess. Her tenure in office was marred by discontent over her high taxes and alleged immoral lifestyle. She was succeeded by Margareta IV van Brederode.
