= Thorn, Netherlands =

Thorn
- City
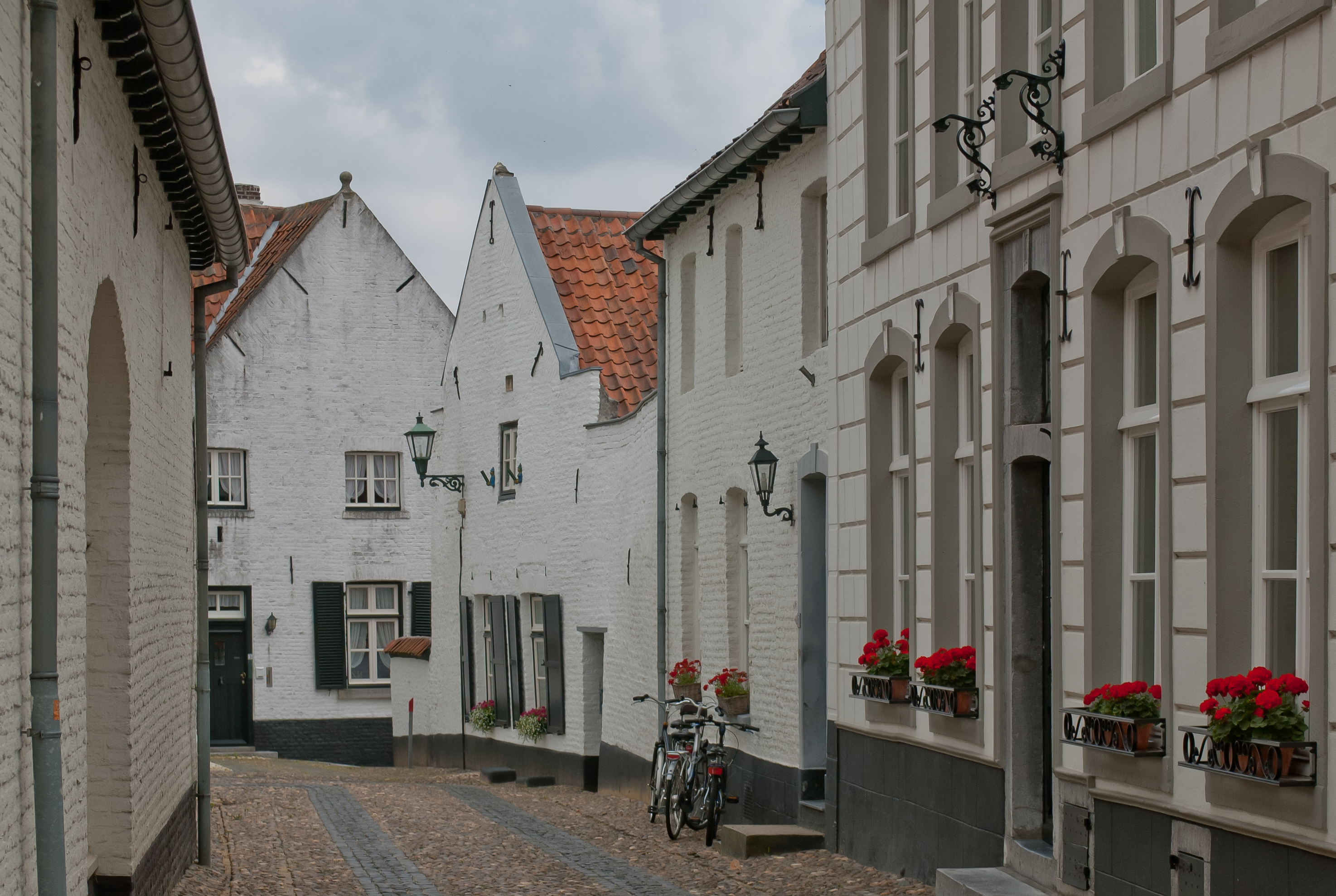
- The Daalstraat (daalstreet) in Thorn

- Flag Coat of arms

- Location in the Netherlands Location in the province of Limburg in the Netherlands
- Coordinates: 51°10′N 5°50′E
- Country: Netherlands
- Province: Limburg
- Municipality: Maasgouw

Area
  - Total: 6.69 km^{2} (2.58 sq mi)
- Elevation: 24 m (79 ft)

Population (2021)
  - Total: 2,490
  - Density: 372/km^{2} (964/sq mi)
- Time zone: UTC+1 (CET)
  - Summer (DST): UTC+2 (CEST)
- Postal code: 6017
- Dialing code: 0475

Thorn (Dutch: [tɔr(ə)n]; Limburgish: Toear or Thoear) is a city in the municipality of Maasgouw, in the Dutch province of Limburg. It lies on the rivers Meuse and Witbeek. It is known as 'the white city' for its white-washed brick houses in the centre of town. It used to be part of the Imperial Abbey of Thorn.

== History ==
The region of Thorn was originally a swamp nearby the Roman road between Maastricht and Nijmegen. But the region was drained and about 975, Bishop Ansfried of Utrecht founded a Benedictine nunnery. This monastery developed since the 12th century into a secular stift or convent. The principal of the stift was the abbess. She was assisted by a chapter of at most twenty ladies of the nobility.

Previously the abbess and the chapter were endowed with religious tasks but, since the 12th century, they served secular matters and formed the government of a truly sovereign miniature principality, a smaller independent state in the German Holy Roman Empire, approximately 250 x 250 metres. Besides Thorn, Ittervoort, Grathem, Baexem, Stramproy, Ell, Haler and Molenbeersel belonged to this principality. After the French invasion in the winter of 1794–95 and the formal abolition in 1797 made an end to the existence of the abbey and the principality of Thorn; Thorn was first part of the department of Meuse-Inférieure, and after the Vienna Congress it became a municipality of the United Kingdom of the Netherlands.

== Gallery ==
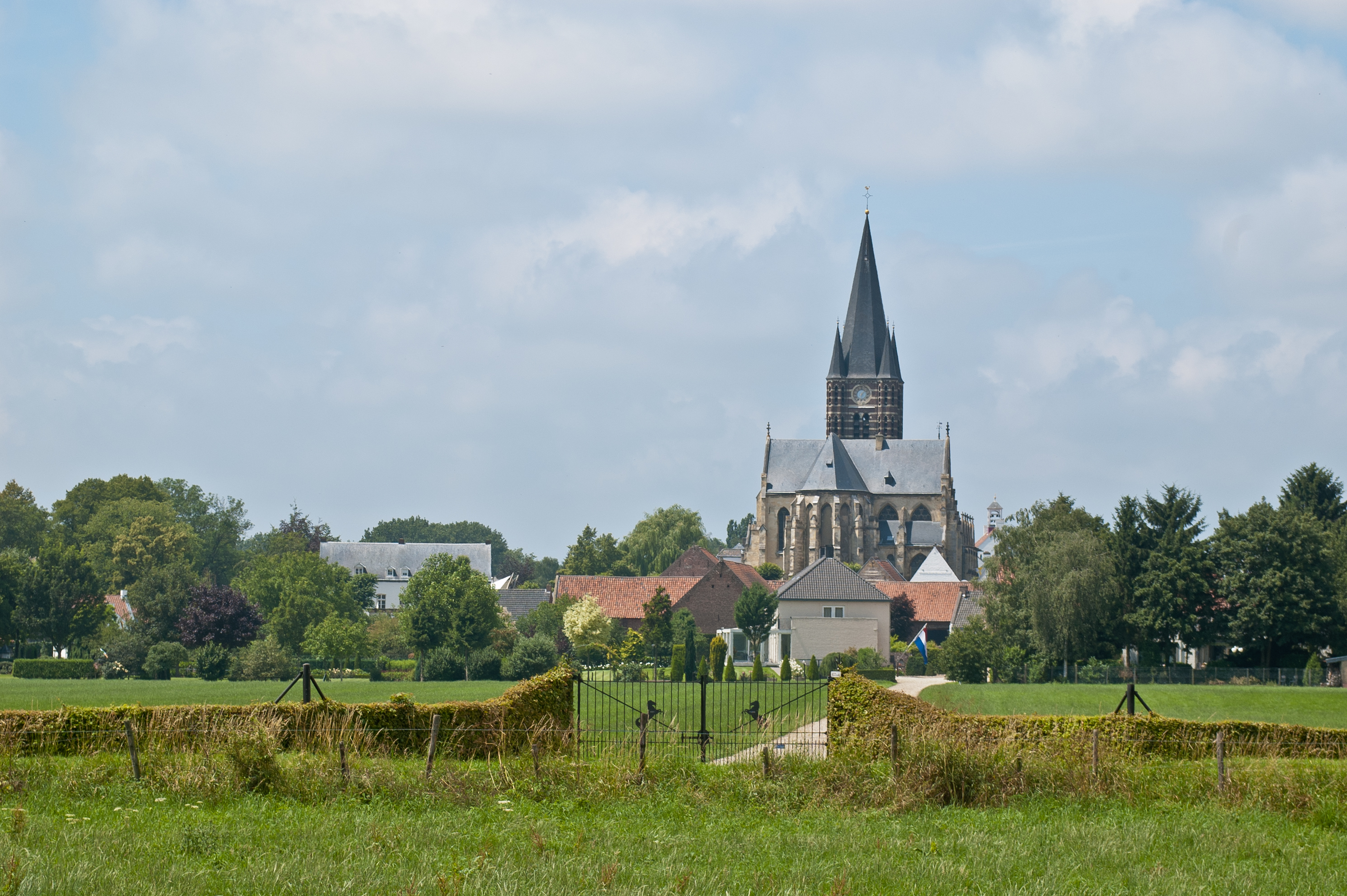
The abbey church of Thorn

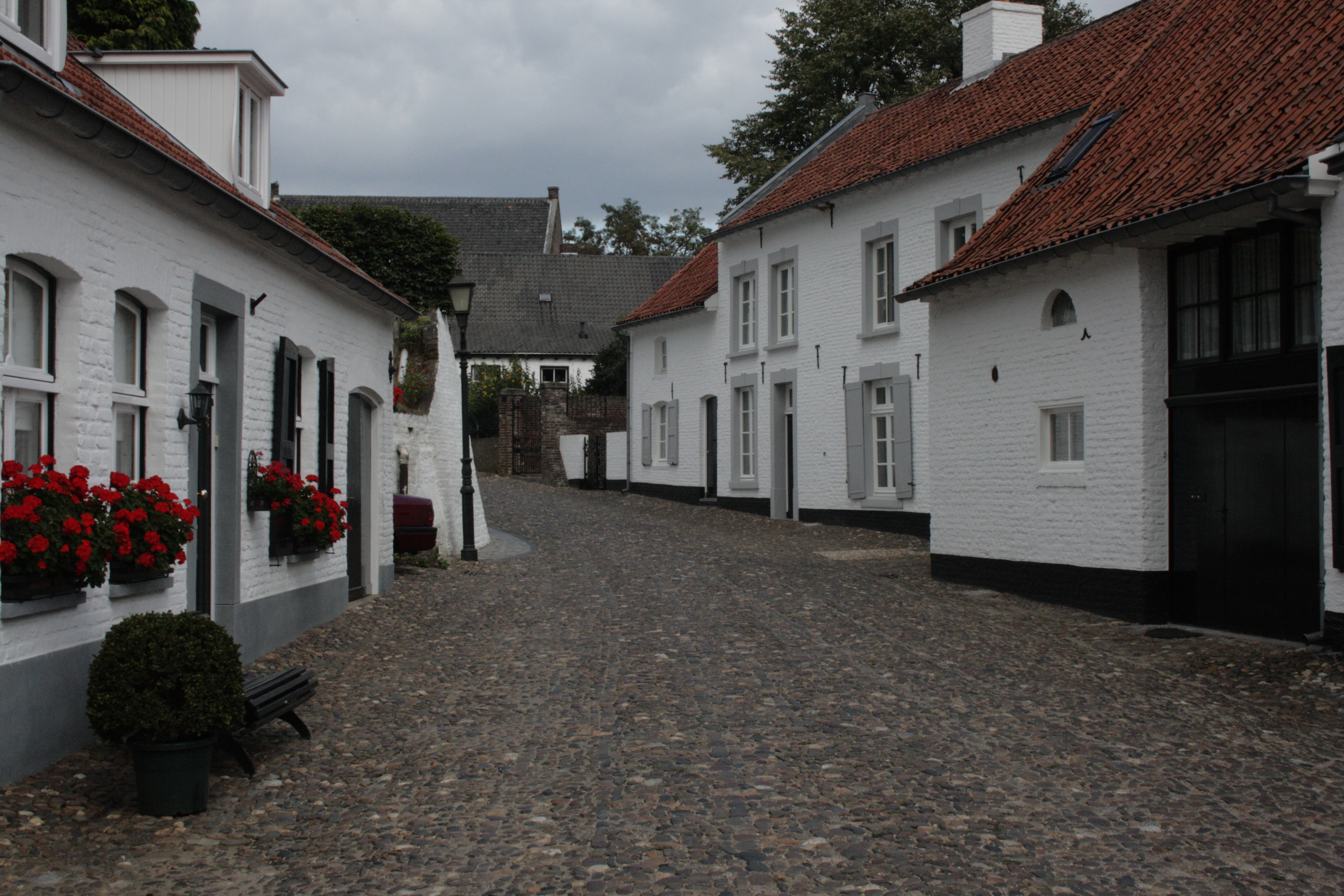
Street view of Thorn

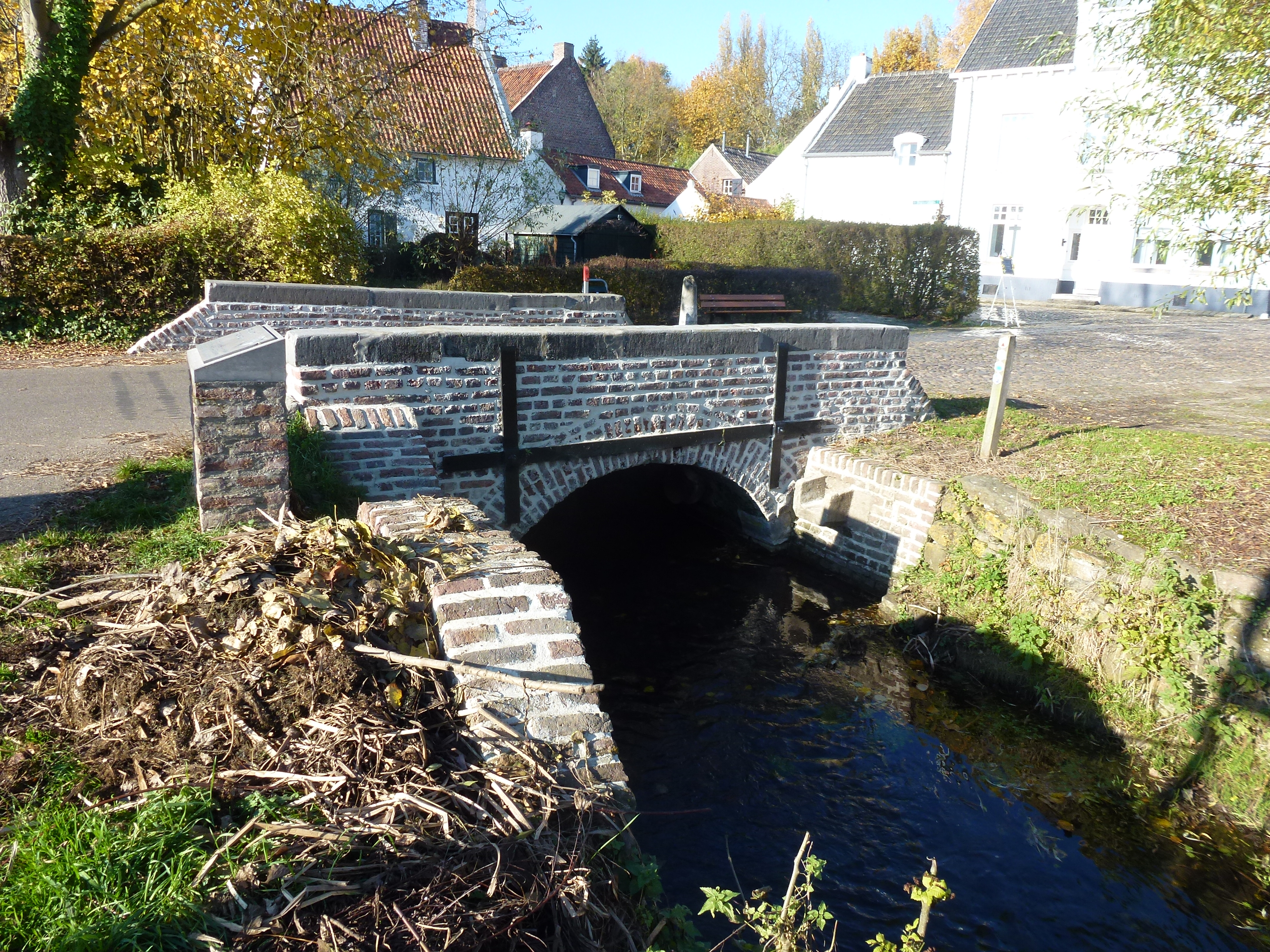
Brigade Piron Bridge

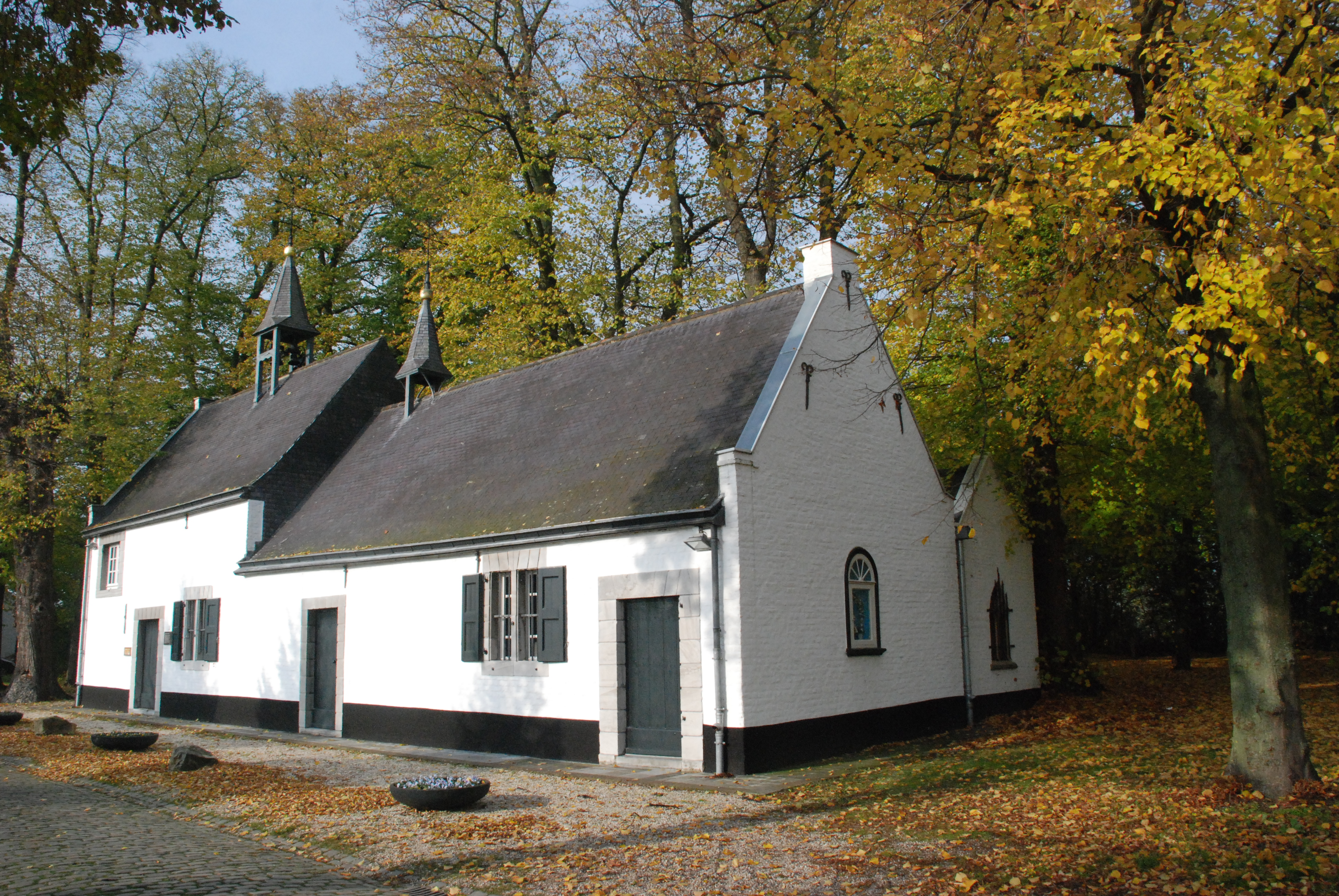
Chapel

== See also ==
- Thorn Abbey
