= Thorn Abbey =

Monastery in Thorn, the Netherlands

Coordinates: 50°10′N 5°50′E

Imperial Abbey of Thorn Reichsstift Thorn (de) Rieksstif van Thoear (li) Rijksabdij van Thorn (nl)
- 1292–1794
- Coat of arms

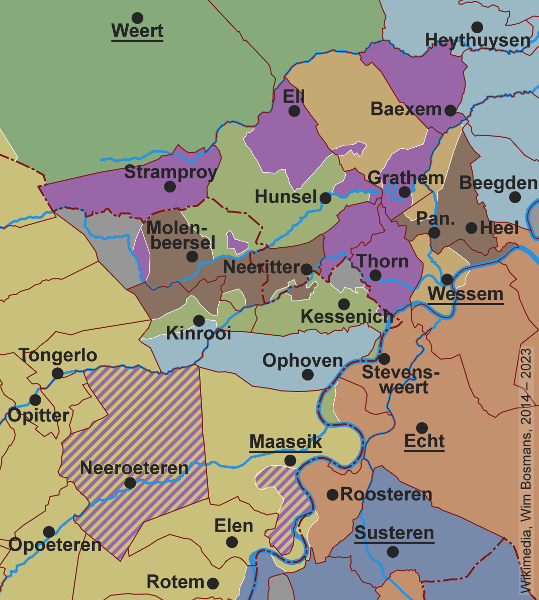
- Territory of the Abbey of Thorn (purple), around 1700.
- Status: Imperial Abbey
- Capital: Thorn
- Common languages: Dutch
- Government: Elective principality
- Abbess
- Historical era: Middle Ages
  - Founded: c. 975
  - Gained Imperial immediacy: 1292
  - Joined Council of Princes: 1793
  - Occupied by France: 1794
  - Awarded to Netherlands: June 9, 1815
Preceded by	Succeeded by
Bishopric of Liège / Bishopric of Liège	Meuse-Inférieure

Thorn Abbey or the Imperial Abbey of Thorn was an imperial abbey of the Holy Roman Empire in what is now the Netherlands. It was founded in the 10th century and remained independent until 1794, when it was occupied by French troops. The self-ruling abbey enjoyed imperial immediacy and belonged to the Lower Rhenish-Westphalian Circle.

At the time Thorn Abbey was invaded by the French revolutionaries in 1794, its territory was composed of three non-contiguous parts totaling 52.1 km^{2}. In addition, the abbess shared rule over nearby areas totaling 35 km^{2}. The abbey's territory was divided into four "quarters", each administered by two mayors. The population in 1796 was 2,975 inhabitants.

In 1797, the abbey was officially dissolved by the French. The Baroque interior survived the restoration but the spire was replaced with a massive neo-Gothic bell tower.

== Foundation ==
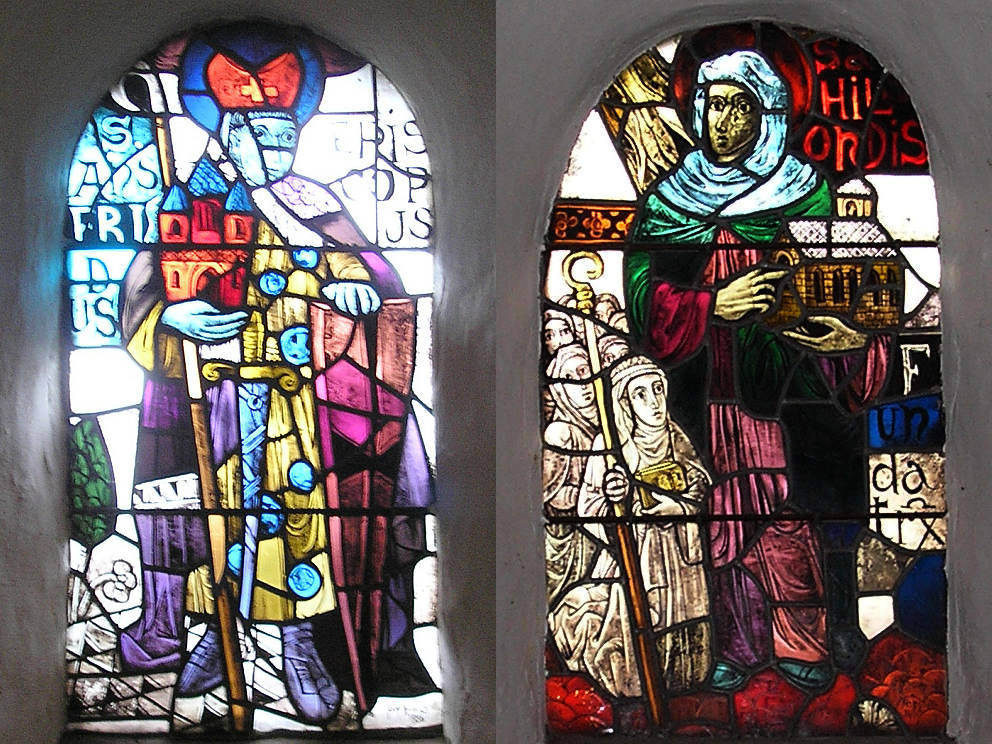
Ansfried of Utrecht and his wife Hereswint are regarded as the founders of the Abbey of Thorn

A Benedictine double monastery was founded by Count Ansfried of Utrecht and his wife Hereswint, countess of Strijen, in the late tenth century on land owned by Hereswint at Thorn. Hereswint was to be the first abbess but died on her way there; and Benedicta took her place.

== Abbey structure ==
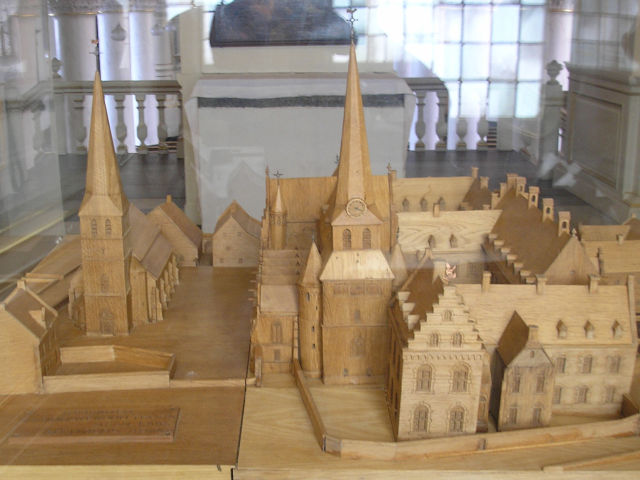
Model of the abbey district

The community of women came only from the high nobility. The Abbey served as a convent school for daughters of the nobility. It is likely that Thorn had belonged to the Benedictine order originally. It probably changed, however, in the 12th century, to a free community of secular canonesses (Damenstift). In 1310, the members of the abbey stressed their secular status and claimed never to have been Benedictine.

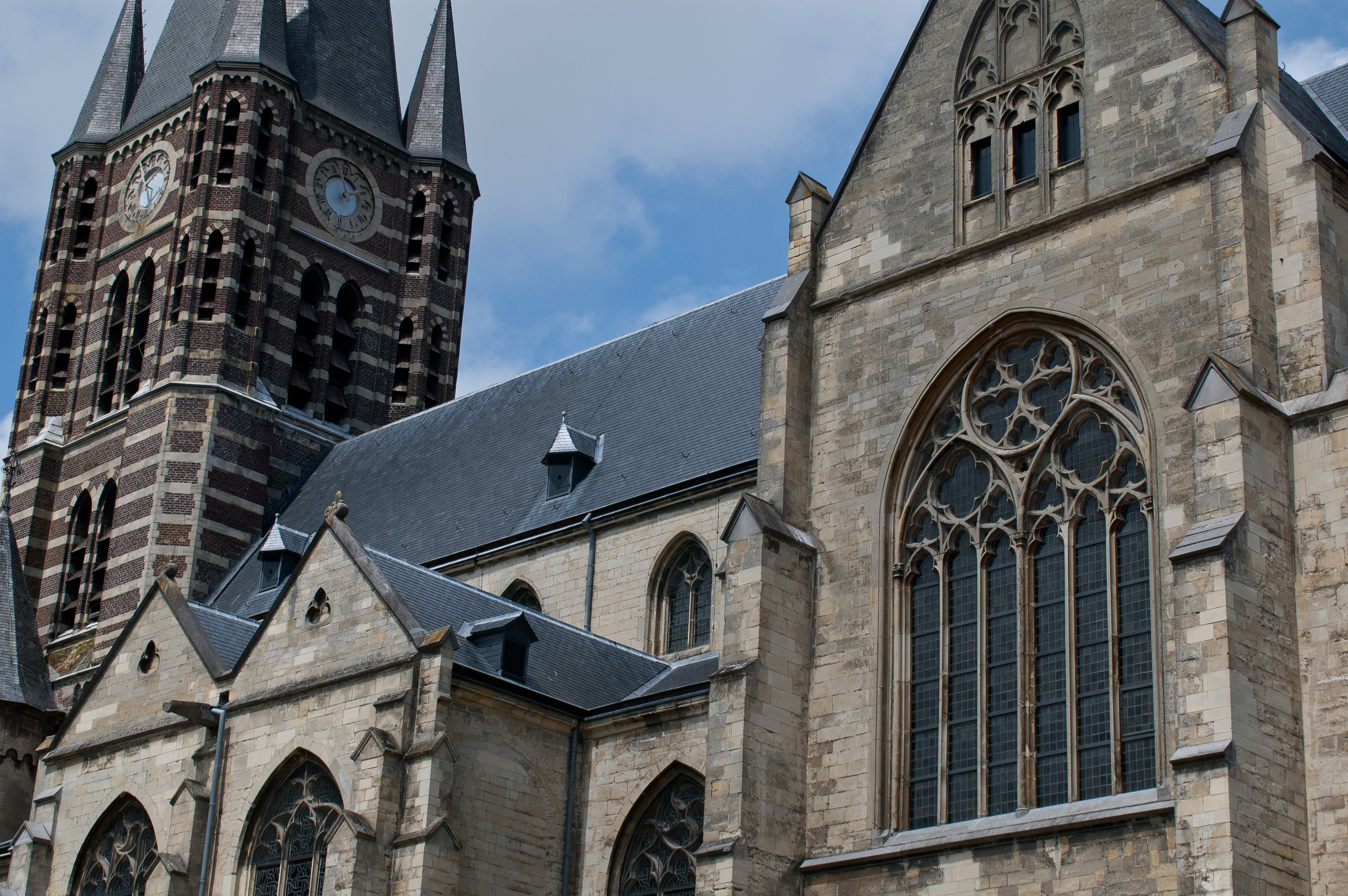
View of the south side of St. Michael's Church

In the 18th century, the collegiate ladies, or canonesses, were, in principle, required to reside in the abbey all year, except for at most six weeks per year. However, for 600 florins, ladies could buy themselves freedom; although in theory they were still required to provide six weeks of choral service, this was not always observed in practice. This possibility of buying freedom appears to have been used frequently. Some ladies belonged to several abbeys. Maria Josepha of Hatzfeld and Gleichen, for example, was a member of the abbeys at Thorn and Essen for 46 years. During this time, she resided in Essen Abbey for four years, but never in Thorn.

The abbey district contained a curia building for the deaconess and five houses for the ladies; some built themselves houses outside the abbey precincts. In the 14th century, a new Gothic church was built.

== History ==
The imperial immediacy of the abbey was confirmed in 1292 by King Adolf of Nassau. Under Emperor Maximilian I, the abbey was under the special imperial protection. In the imperial matriculation register at Worms, the abbey was recorded as reichsunmittelbar. The matriculation duties, however, were transferred to the Counts of Lippe.

The abbey was a member the Lower Rhenish-Westphalian Circle and the Rhenish College of Imperial Prelates.

In the 17th century the governorship of the Spanish Netherlands sought to restrict the imperial immediacy. The abbesses resisted these attempts successfully. In the 18th century, the abbess held the title of Princess. Several abbesses were concurrently heads of Essen Abbey.

The territory was occupied by French troops in 1794 and later annexed by France. In 1815, the Congress of Vienna awarded the territory to the Kingdom of the United Netherlands. The abbey property, the monastery, the palace of the abbess and the other buildings were confiscated and sold to the highest bidders and usually demolished for construction material, with only the abbey church surviving. The abbey Church of St. Michael became a parish church.

== Abbesses ==
- 982–?: Hilsondis (or Hilswinde?)
- 1010–?: Benedicta
- ?–?: Godchildis
- ?–?: Adelaide
- Before 1217: Elizabeth
- 1217–?: Jutta
- 1231–1269: Hildegond de Born
- 1273–1304: Guda von Rennenberg
- 1310–1337: Margaret of Bautersheim I.
- 1337: Isonde of Wied
- 1337–1378: Margaret II of Heinsberg
- 1389–1397: Margaretha III of Horne Perwez
- 1404–1446: Mechtilde of Horne
- 1446-1454: Jacoba of Loon-Heinsberg
- 1454–1473: Else of Buren
- 1473–1486: Gertrude de Sombreffe
- 1486–1531: Eva of Isenburg
- Disputed claim during this period
- 1531–1577: Margaretha IV of Brederode
- 1577–1579: Josina I of Manderscheid
- 1579–1604: Josina II of the Mark
- 1604–1631: Anna of the Mark
- 1631–1632: Josina Walburgis of Löwenstein-Rochefort
- 1632–1646: Anna Eleonora of Staufen (simultaneously also Abbess of Essen)
- 1646–1647: Anna Catherina of Salm-Reifferscheid
- 1647–1690: Anna Salome of Manderscheid-Blankenheim (from 1690 to 1691 she was abbess of Essen)
- 1690–1706: Eleanor of Löwenstein-Rochefort
- 1706–1717: Anna Juliana of Manderscheid-Blankenstein
- 1717–1776: Countess Palatine Francisca Christina of Sulzbach (she was also Abbess of Essen)
- 1776–1795: Maria Kunigunde of Saxony (she was also Abbess of Essen)
