= Borbeck Castle =

Coordinates: 51°28′06″N 06°56′32″E

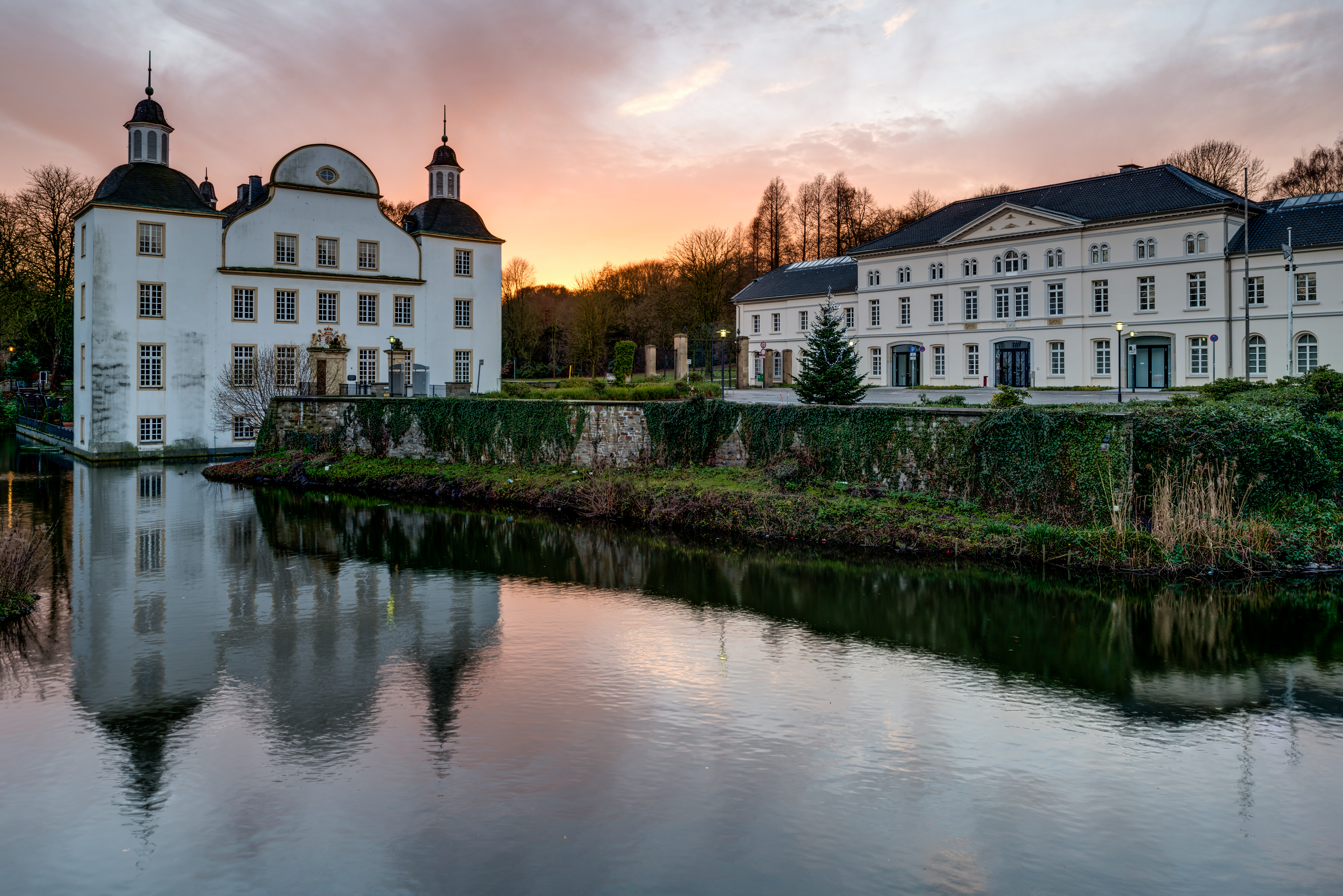
Borbeck Castle and its inner bailey

Borbeck Castle is a Baroque moated castle in the Essen district of Borbeck. From the 14th century onward it served as the preferred residence of the prince-abbesses of the Essen Abbey, and it acquired its present external appearance during the 18th century. Since the 1980s it has been used as a venue for continuing education and cultural events.

== Description ==
The Borbeck Castle complex consists of a main building and a long former inner bailey (Wirtschaftsgebäude) situated to the north-east of the manor house. Both buildings are surrounded by a 42-hectare castle park designed in the style of an English landscape garden.
