= Uder (Verwaltungsgemeinschaft) =

Coordinates: 51.367°N 10.067°E

Uder is a former Verwaltungsgemeinschaft ("collective municipality") in the district Eichsfeld, in Thuringia, Germany. The seat of the Verwaltungsgemeinschaft was in Uder. It was disbanded in January 2024, when most of its members became part of the municipality Uder.

The Verwaltungsgemeinschaft Uder consisted of the following municipalities:

1. Asbach-Sickenberg
2. Birkenfelde
3. Dietzenrode-Vatterode
4. Eichstruth
5. Lenterode
6. Lutter
7. Mackenrode
8. Röhrig
9. Schönhagen
10. Steinheuterode
11. Thalwenden
12. Uder
13. Wüstheuterode
