= Meinhard =

- Municipality
- Coat of arms

- Location of Meinhard within Werra-Meißner-Kreis district
- Interactive map of Meinhard
- Location within Germany Location within Hesse
- Coordinates: 51°01′N 10°10′E
- Country: Germany
- State: Hesse
- Admin. region: Kassel
- District: Werra-Meißner-Kreis
- Subdivisions: 11 districts

Government
  - Mayor (2020–26): Gerhold Brill

Area
  - Total: 39.62 km^{2} (15.30 sq mi)
- Elevation: 363 m (1,191 ft)

Population (2025-12-31)
  - Total: 2,582
  - Density: 65.17/km^{2} (168.8/sq mi)
- Time zone: UTC+01:00 (CET)
  - Summer (DST): UTC+02:00 (CEST)
- Postal codes: 37276
- Dialling codes: 05651
- Vehicle registration: ESW
- Website: www.meinhard.de

Meinhard (German pronunciation: [ˈmaɪnhaʁt]) is a municipality in the Werra-Meißner-Kreis in Hesse, Germany.

== Geography ==
=== Location ===
The community lies in the North Hesse Low Mountain Range landscape on the edge of the Werra valley, 3 km from the district seat of Eschwege.

Near Meinhard-Frieda, the Frieda empties into the Werra. After heavy rainfall, it can swell into a fast-running river that can wash the bank of the Werra away. On the bank facing Meinhard-Jestädt, the Wehre empties into the Werra.

=== Neighbouring communities ===
Meinhard borders in the northeast and the east on the communities of Volkerode, Pfaffschwende, Kella and Geismar (all four in Thuringia’s Eichsfeld district), in the southeast on the town of Wanfried, in the south and west on the town of Eschwege and in the northwest on the town of Bad Sooden-Allendorf (all three in the Werra-Meißner-Kreis).

=== Constituent communities ===
The community’s seven Ortsteile are Frieda, Grebendorf (administrative seat), Hitzelrode, Jestädt, Neuerode, Motzenrode and Schwebda.

== Politics ==
=== Community council ===
The municipal election held on 26 March 2006 yielded the following results:

Parties and voter communities		% 2006	Seats; 2006	% 2001	Seats; 2001
CDU	Christian Democratic Union of Germany	18.5	6	16.7	5
SPD	Social Democratic Party of Germany	58.2	18	60.6	19
F.D.P./ÜWG	F.D.P./ÜWG	23.3	7	22.7	7
Total		100.0	31	100.0	31
Voter turnout in %		62.1		64.3	

=== Mayor ===
- 2002–2013: Hans Giller (SPD)
- 2013–incumbent: Gerhold Brill

== Culture and sightseeing ==
=== Buildings ===
- Ruins of Schwebda Castle (moated)

== Economy and infrastructure ==
=== Transport ===
Through Bundesstraße 249 (Eschwege-Mühlhausen), which runs right through the community, Meinhard is linked to the highway network.

== Famous people ==
- Friedrich Rudolf Ernst Freiherr von Feilitzsch (b. 14 July 1858 in Jestädt; d. 23 January 1942 in Bückeburg), politician in the Principality of Schaumburg-Lippe and its first Prime Minister.
- Heinz Fromm (b. 10 July 1948 in Meinhard-Frieda) has been since June 2000 President of the Federal Office for Constitutional Protection
