= Dieterode =

- Municipality
- Coat of arms

- Location of Dieterode within Eichsfeld district
- Interactive map of Dieterode
- Location within Germany Location within Thuringia
- Coordinates: 51°17′51″N 10°6′6″E
- Country: Germany
- State: Thuringia
- District: Eichsfeld
- Municipal assoc.: Ershausen/Geismar

Government
  - Mayor (2022–28): Uwe Günther

Area
  - Total: 2.79 km^{2} (1.08 sq mi)
- Elevation: 403 m (1,322 ft)

Population (2025-12-31)
  - Total: 76
  - Density: 27/km^{2} (71/sq mi)
- Time zone: UTC+01:00 (CET)
  - Summer (DST): UTC+02:00 (CEST)
- Postal codes: 37318
- Dialling codes: 036082
- Vehicle registration: EIC
- Website: www.ershausen- geismar.de

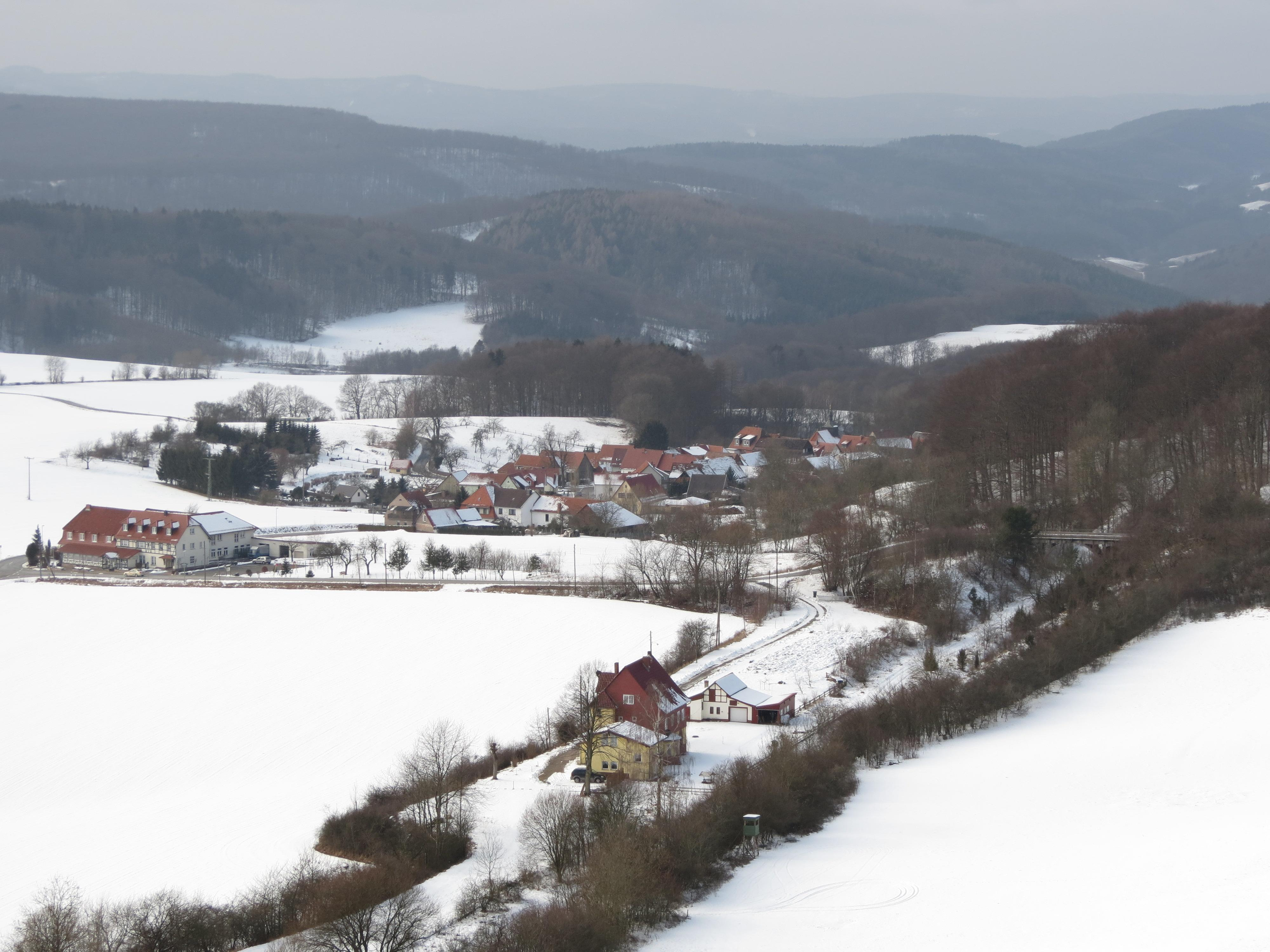
View of 'Dieterode and its former railway station'

Dieterode is a municipality in the district Eichsfeld, Thuringia, Germany. It is part of the municipal association Ershausen/Geismar.

== Situation ==
Dieterode, is situated eight kilometers south west of Heilbad Heiligenstadt between Höheberg and Rachelsberg. Neighbouring communities are Kalteneber (north east), Rüstungen, Schwobfeld (to the south) and Eichstruth (to the west).

== History ==
The place is said to be firstly mentioned 1184 or 1251 as "Diethenroth". The church, built in 1520, was newly built in 1785. In 1914, railway reached Dieterode. (Schwebda). Due to Inner German border closing, railway traffic ended in 1947. The rails were dismantled.

=== Demography ===
Population (31. December):

Year	Inhabitants
1994	100
1995	100
1996	100
1997	102
1998	107
1999	107
2000	104

Year	Inhabitants
2001	105
2002	105
2003	104
2004	103
2005	104
2006	99
2007	94

Year	Inhabitants
2008	93
2009	92
2010	92
2011	76
2012	74
2013	75
2014	74

Source: Thüringian Statistics Office

== Politics ==
=== Community council ===
The Dieterode community council comprises 6 members.

The election proposal list of FFw (FFw = Voluntary Fire brigade) won all 6 seats (Date: 7. Juni 2009)

=== Mayor ===
The (voluntary) mayor Uwe Günther (FFw) was first elected in 1994, and re-elected in 1999, 2004, 2010 and 2016.

== Tourist attractions ==
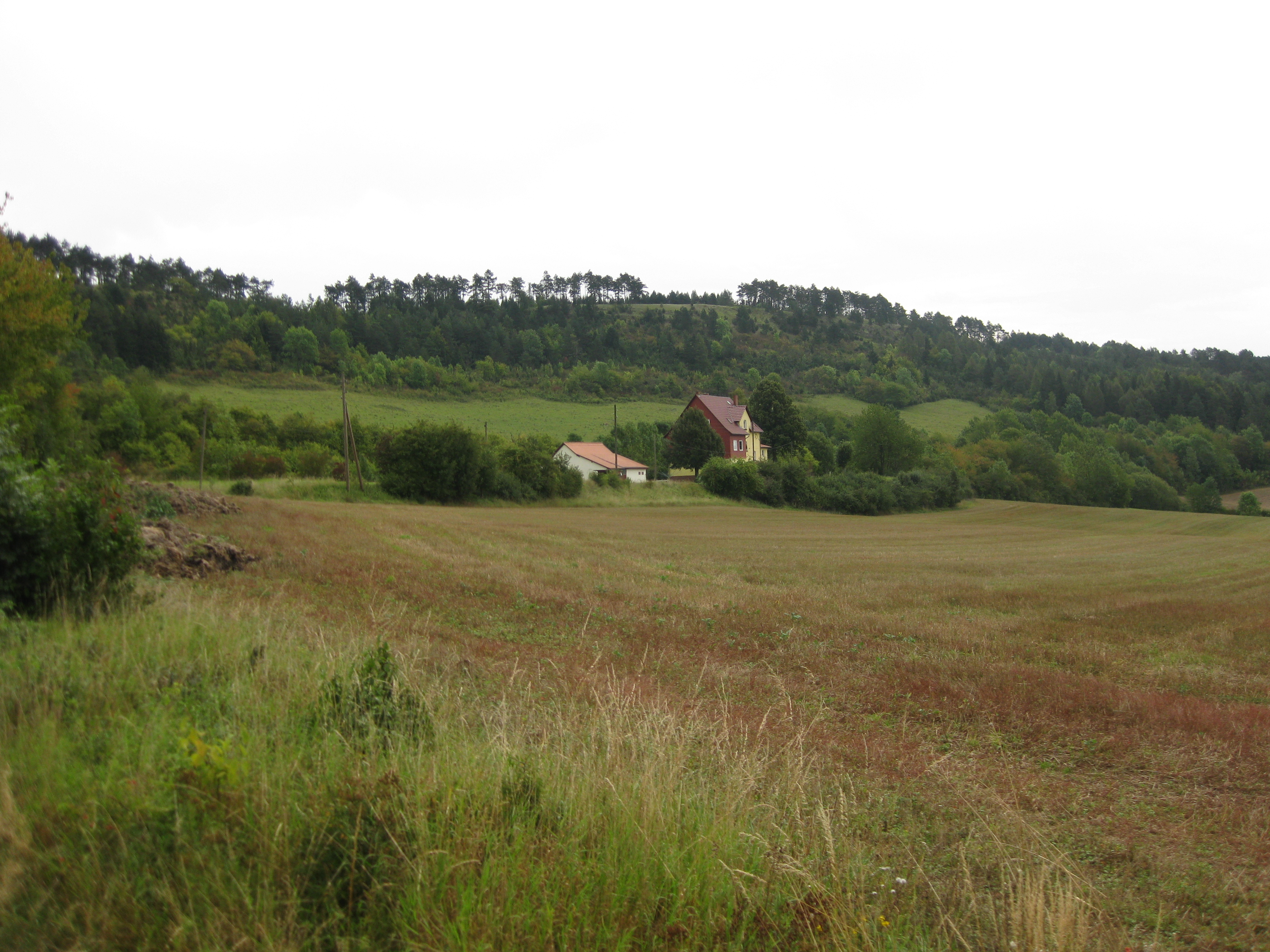
Höheberg and Dieteröder Klippen seen from Dieterode

- Catholic church „St. Georg“, built 1785
- Former railway station Dieterode; almost originally status
