= Lutter (Frieda) =

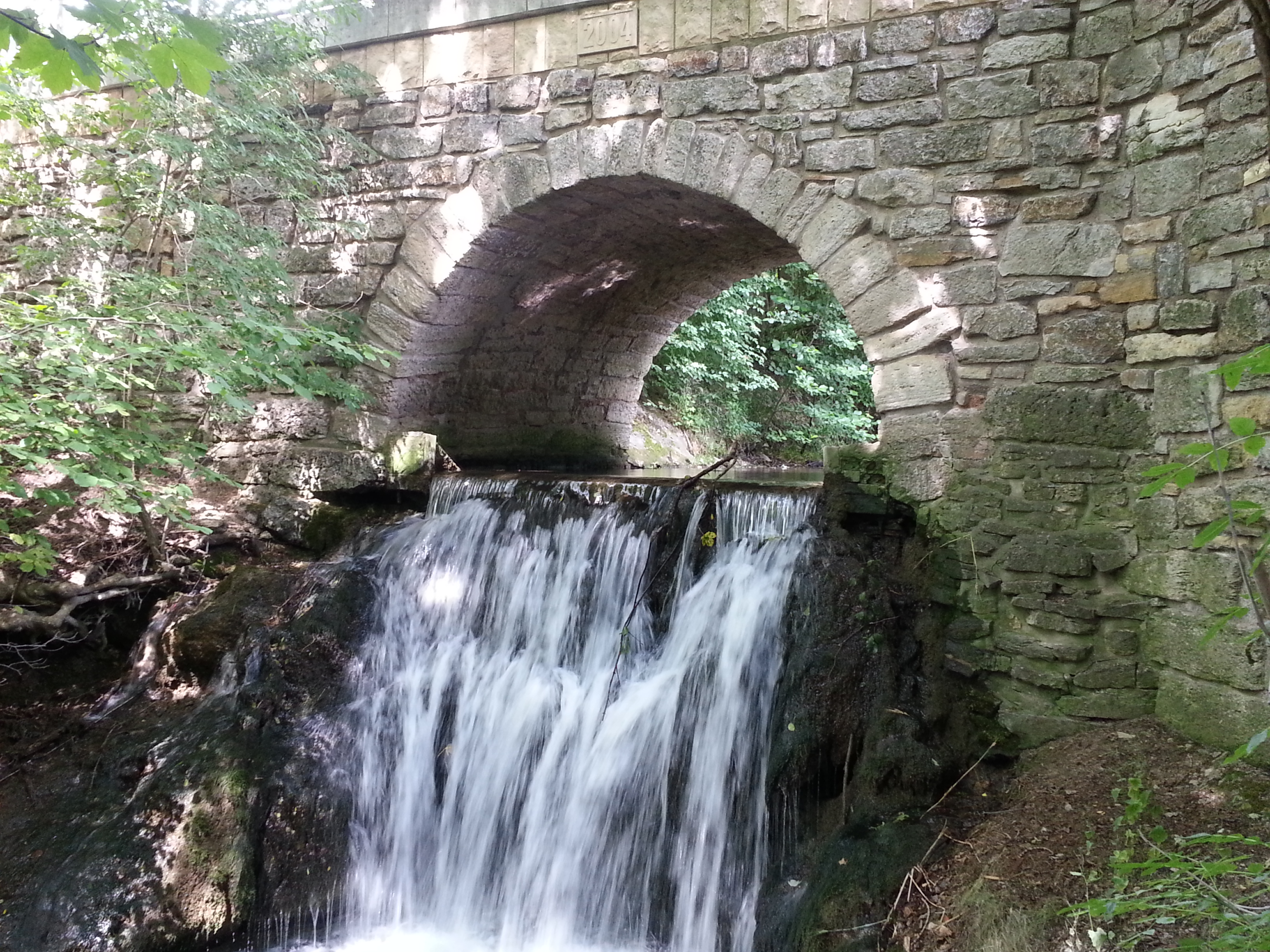

Location
- Country: Germany
- States: Thuringia

Physical characteristics
- Mouth
  - location: Frieda
  - coordinates: 51.2233°N 10.1843°E

Basin features
- Progression: Frieda→ Werra→ Weser→ North Sea

Lutter (German pronunciation: [ˈlʊtɐ]) is a river of Thuringia, Germany. It joins the Frieda near Geismar.

== See also ==
- List of rivers of Thuringia
