= Schönhagen =

Schönhagen may refer to:

== Germany ==
- Schönhagen, Thuringia, in the Eichsfeld district, Thuringia
- Schönhagen, Trebbin, in the Teltow-Fläming district, Brandenburg
- A locality in Uslar, Lower Saxony
- A locality in Brodersby, Rendsburg-Eckernförde, Schleswig-Holstein
- Schönhagen Airport, Brandenburg

== Poland ==
- the former German name of Osina, Goleniów County, Poland
