= Jewish Cemetery of Jestädt =

Cemetery in Meinhard, Germany

Coordinates: 51°13′13″N 10°00′56″E

The Jestädt Jewish Cemetery (German: Jüdische Friedhof Jestädt) is a Jewish cemetery in Jestädt, in the Municipality of Meinhard in the Werra-Meißner-Kreis in the State of Hesse of Germany. A protected cultural monument, it is one of the oldest of its kind in Hesse.

== Description ==
The cemetery is located north of Jestädt, on the east side of the Motzenroder Straße [ "Motzenrod Road" ], about 547 yards ( 500 meters ) from the outskirts of the village. It runs along the slope to the edge of the forest. There are 170 graves in the cemetery.

== History ==
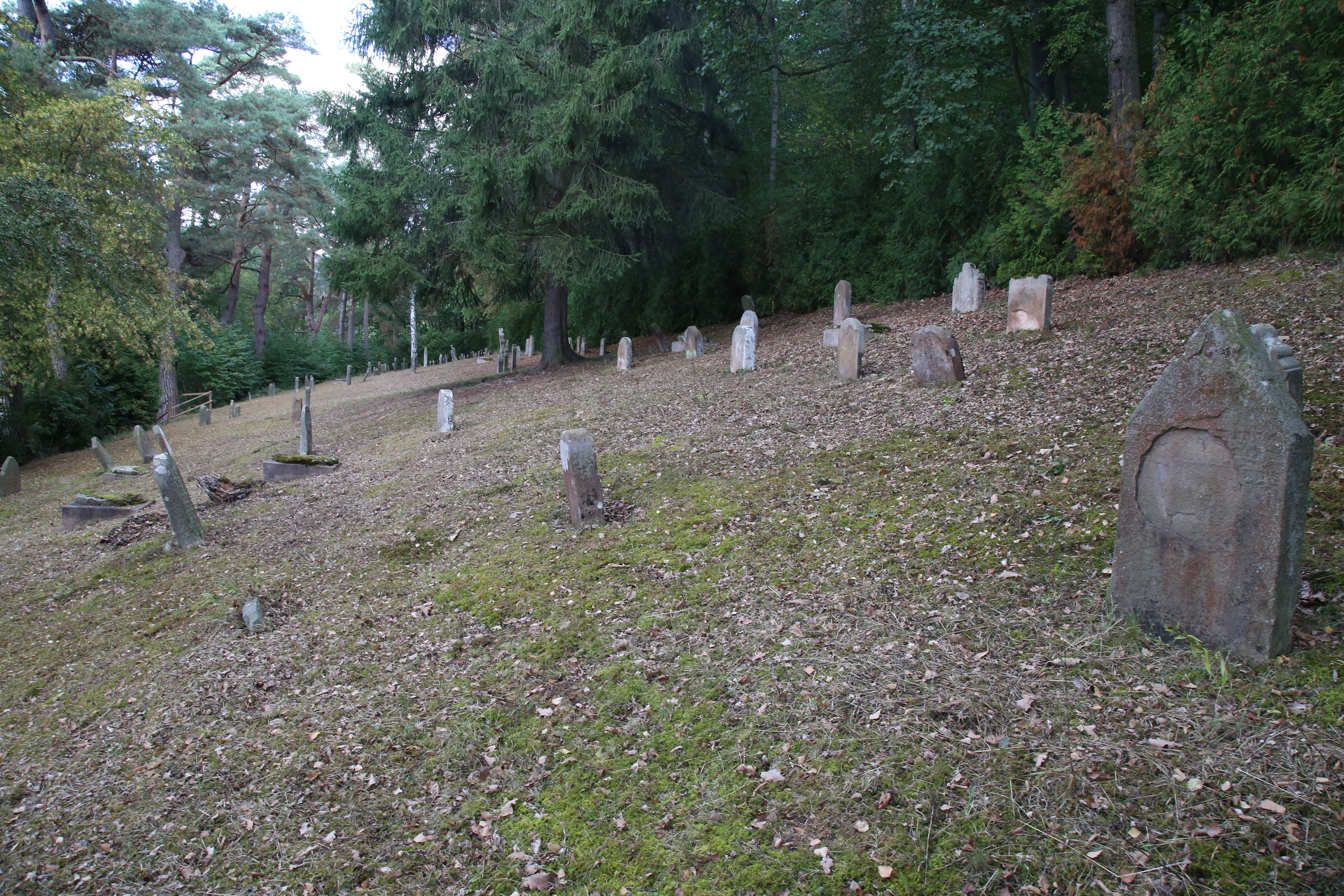
Jestädt Jewish Cemetery

The cemetery was occupied at least from 1642 and until 1855, as long as the Jews had lived in Jestädt, but it might have already been used as early as 1501. The village, with an average population of 550 Christians, was barely big enough to support even a minyan. In the middle of the 17th Century, for example, there were only two Jewish families. One of them was headed by the overseer of the cemetery, who had to pay protection money to the Herren [ Lords ] von Boyneburg-Hohenstein, and the other, under the protection of the local authorities, was a woman "who earned her daily bread with dirty work". In those days, the Jews were not allowed to own land. But, between 1724 and 1800, they managed to buy 27 Ruthen ( rods ) of arable land from the Herren von Boysenburg-Hohenstein to officially establish their own cemetery, which had already been in use for more than 75 years. They still had to pay them a quit-rent of three florins a year and the Schultheiß [ village mayor ] the protection money but the Jews had a cemetery that can be properly called Jewish.

The cemetery was used as the burial ground for the Jews of nearby Abterode ( until 1660 ), Reichensachsen ( until 1700 ) and Sontra ( until 1710 ), which all later established their own cemeteries, and also for Netra and Eschwege. The oldest of the surviving tombstones dates from 1642 and the last of them marked the grave of Salomon Kugelmann, who died on 11 April 1855 ( 23 Nisan 5615, according to the Jewish calendar ). Two years later, in 1857, the cemetery was closed when the Jews of Eschwege opened their own cemetery but it opened for one more time on 28 April 1861 ( 18 Iyar 5621, according to the Jewish calendar ) for the burial of the last remaining Jew of Jestädt, a penniless old man who had died childless at the age of 73.

An "Historischer Plan von 1780 [ Historical Plan of 1780 ]" shows two orthogonal parts of the cemetery. One of them was the "Alter Juden-Todtenhoff" [ Old Jewish Graveyard ], and the other was the "Juden Todten Hoff" [ Jewish Graveyard ]. Of the older half, no traces remain today.
