= Mackenrode =

Mackenrode may refer to the following places in Germany:

- Mackenrode, Thuringia, in the Eichsfeld district, Thuringia
- Mackenrode (Hohenstein), a locality in Hohenstein, in the Nordhausen district, Thuringia
- Mackenrode (Landolfshausen), a locality in Landolfshausen, in the Göttingen district, Lower Saxony
