= Ershausen/Geismar =

- Verwaltungsgemeinschaft
- Map of Eichsfeld highlighting Ershausen/Geismar
- Interactive map of Ershausen/Geismar
- Location within Germany Location within Thuringia
- Coordinates: 51°15′N 10°10′E
- Country: Germany
- State: Thuringia
- District: Eichsfeld
- Seat: Schimberg
- Subdivisions: 10 municipalities

Area
  - Total: 83.88 km^{2} (32.39 sq mi)

Population (2025-12-31)
  - Total: 4,906
  - Density: 58.49/km^{2} (151.5/sq mi)
- Time zone: UTC+01:00 (CET)
  - Summer (DST): UTC+02:00 (CEST)
- Website: www.ershausen-geismar.de

Ershausen/Geismar is a municipal association (German: Verwaltungsgemeinschaft) in the district of Eichsfeld, in Thuringia, Germany. The seat of the municipal association is in Schimberg.

The association consists of the following municipalities:

1. Dieterode
2. Geismar
3. Kella
4. Krombach
5. Pfaffschwende
6. Schimberg
7. Schwobfeld
8. Sickerode
9. Volkerode
10. Wiesenfeld
