= Jestädt =

- Ortsteil of Meinhard
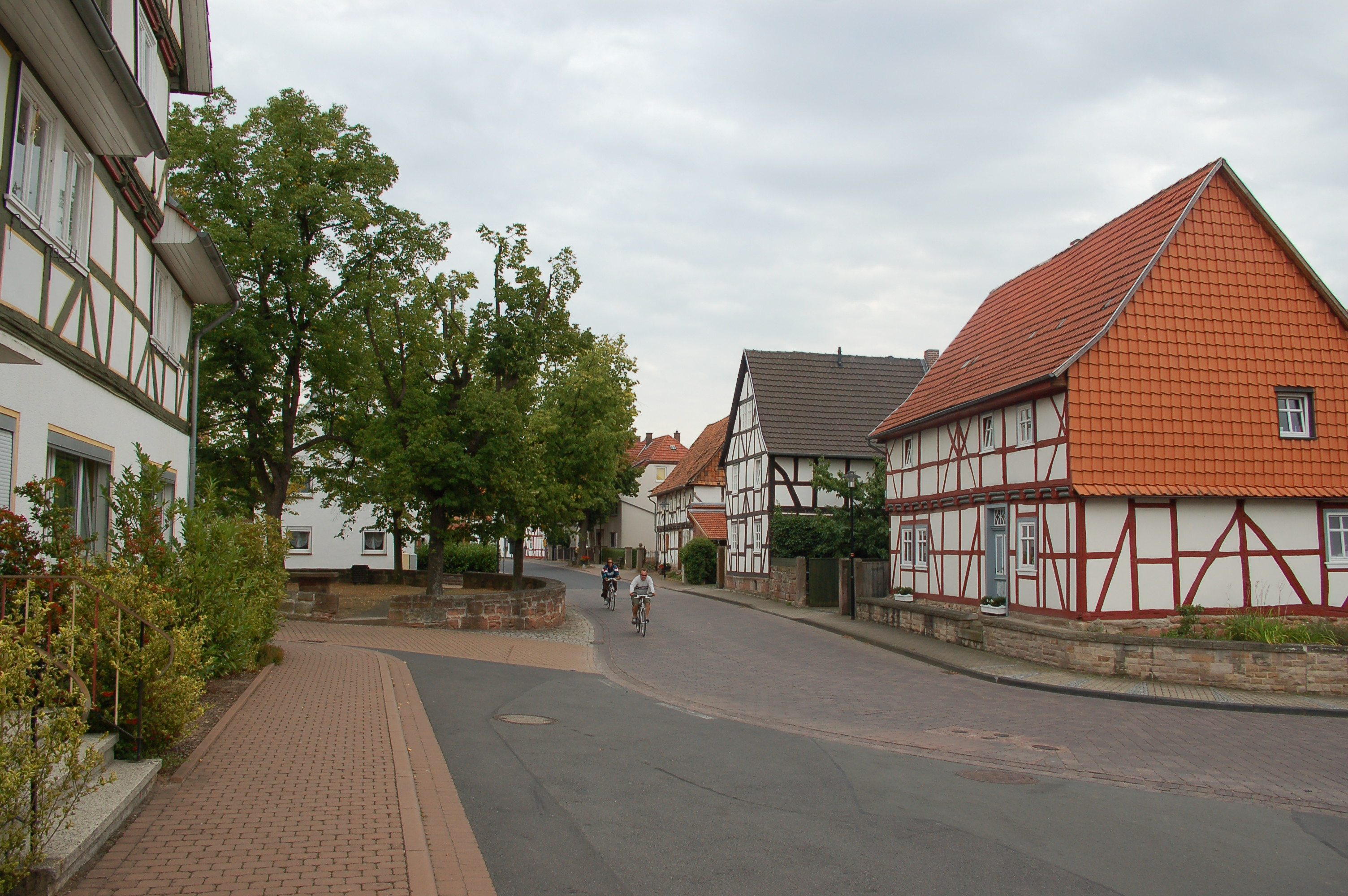
- Village green (left) and the oldest timber house in the region (right)
- Interactive map of Jestädt
- Location within Germany Location within Hesse
- Coordinates: 51°01′N 10°10′E
- Country: Germany
- State: Hesse
- District: Werra-Meißner-Kreis
- Municipality: Meinhard

Area
  - Total: 19.61 km^{2} (7.57 sq mi)
- Elevation: 163 m (535 ft)

Population (2014)
  - Total: 788
  - Density: 40.2/km^{2} (104/sq mi)
- Time zone: UTC+01:00 (CET)
  - Summer (DST): UTC+02:00 (CEST)
- Postal codes: 37276
- Dialling codes: 05651
- Vehicle registration: ESW
- Website: www.meinhard-jestaedt.de

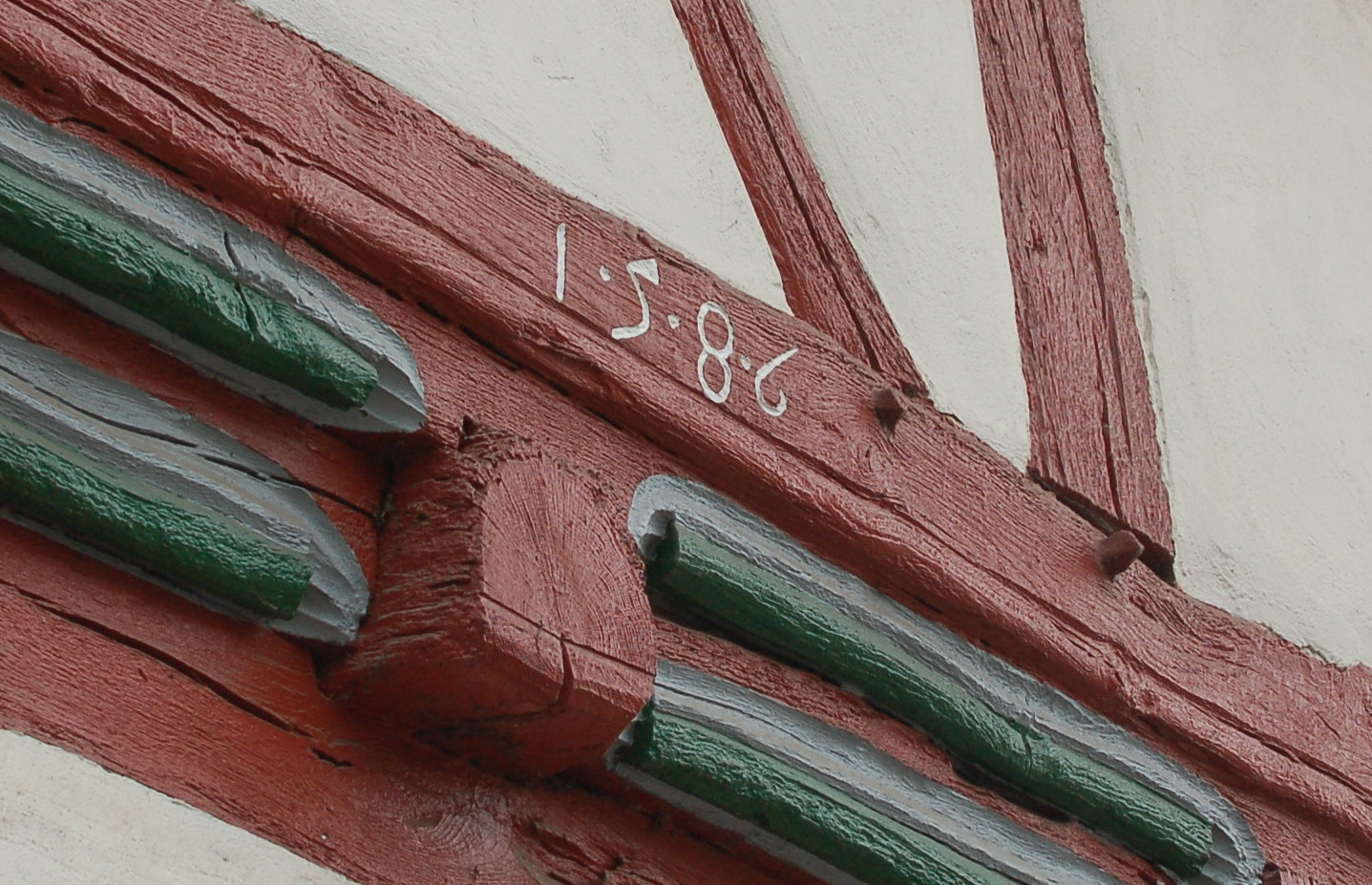
Oldest timber house in the region, built in 1586

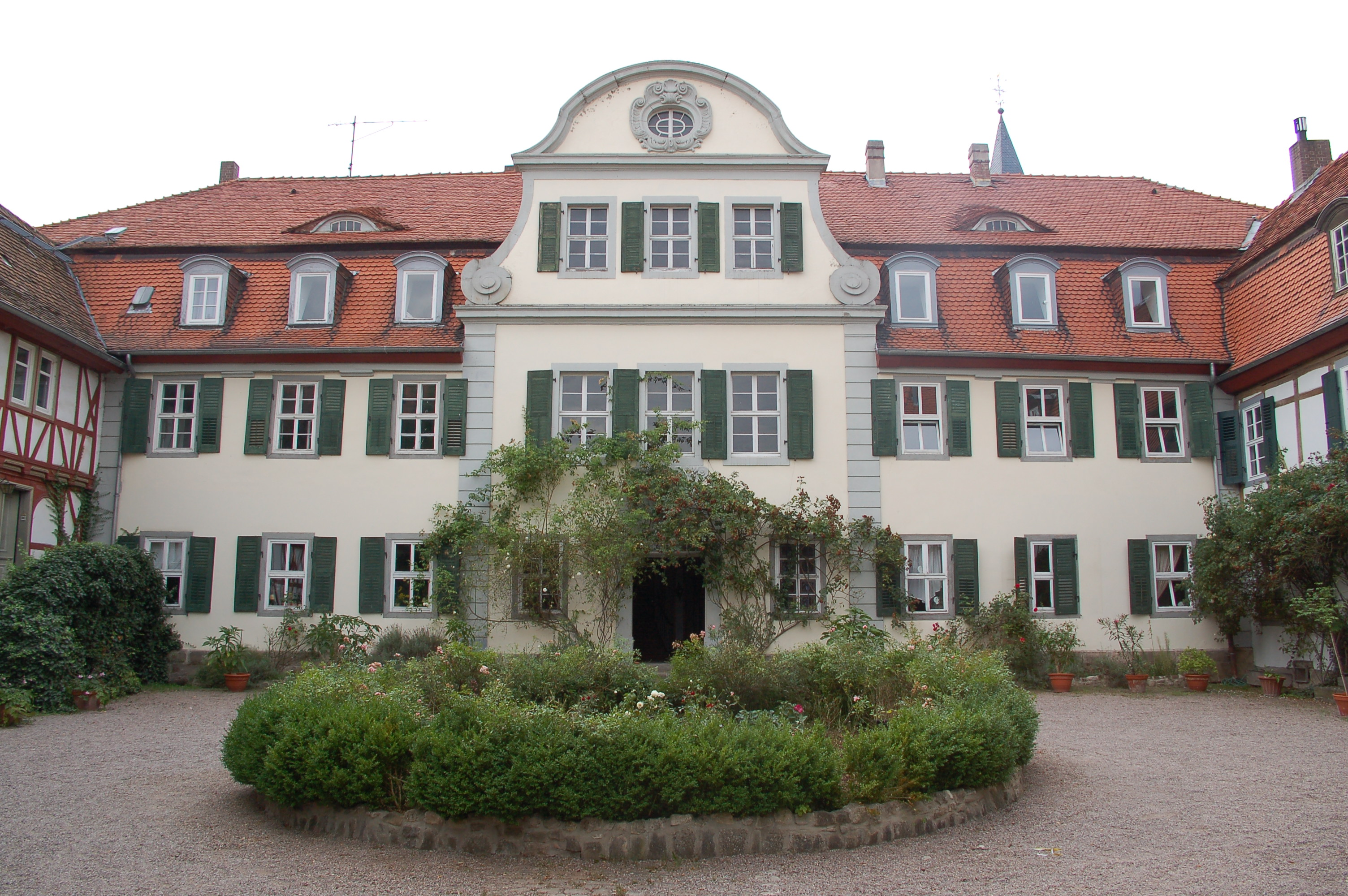
Schloss Jestädt in 2008

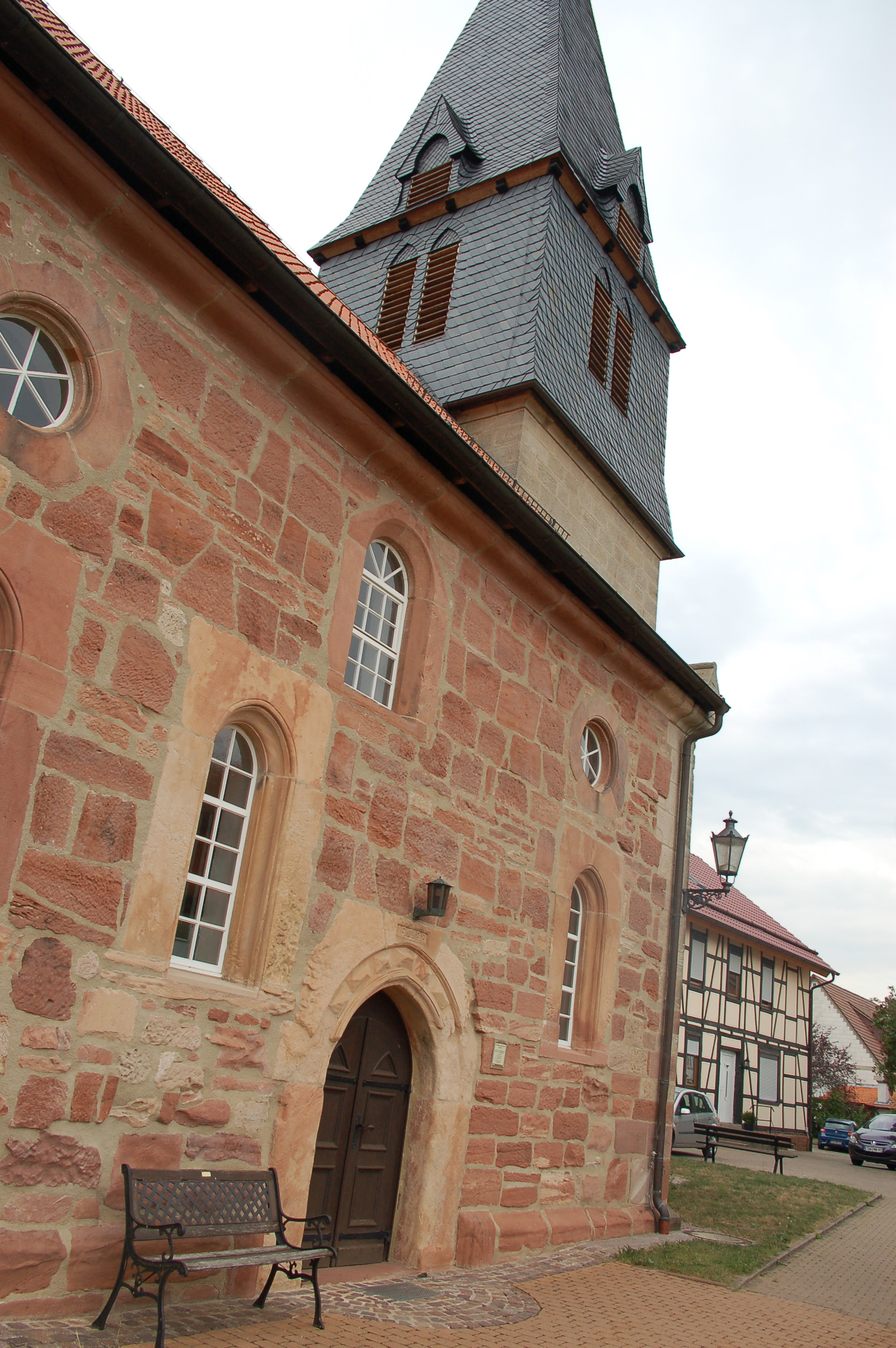
Village church, whose nave was built in 1588

Jestädt is a borough of the Municipality (German: Gemeinde) of Meinhard in the Werra-Meißner-Kreis in the State of Hesse of Germany.

== Geography ==
Jestädt lies at the far southwestern foothills of the Gobert mountain range in the Werratal – the valley of the Werra River in the Kaufungen Forest – and on the north side of the Werra River, 2.7 miles ( 4.5 kilometers ) northwest of Eschwege. This river flows south of Jestädt. The Mühlbach [ "Mill Brook" ] runs through the middle of the village to one side of the Werra and the Wehre River empties into the other side in the west-south-west of the village. The neighboring places are Motzenrode in the north, Neuerode in the northeast, Grebendorf in the southeast, Niederhone in the south and Albungen in the northwest. Two main roads running through Jestädt are the Landesstraße [ State Route ] 3403 and the Kreisstraße [ District Route ] 3.

== History ==
Mentioned for the first time in the records in 876, Jestädt is one of the oldest settlements in the ancient district of Eschwege. It was originally built as a fortified village to defend a Ford across the Werra River.

The village's name, according to Professor Theodor Haas of Fulda, is composed of two words. One of them is an adjective, either gahi from Old High German or gaehe or gah from Middle High German, both meaning "sudden" and "suddenly", with the connotation of "steep slope". The other is the word Stätte, the German word for "place". Gahesteti or Jestaedt therefore means a place on a steep slope, which describes the actual location of Jestädt today. It was spelled as "Gestede" in 1324 and "Jestade" in 1414 but its present spelling did not come until 1664.

Wine was already cultivated in the 10th century in Jestädt. The vineyard north of the village might be one of the possessions mentioned in 994 by the Holy Roman Emperor, Otto III, in his deed of gift to his sister Sophia, the Abbess of Gandersheim. It flourished until the 18th century. In 1738 there were eight wineries in Jestädt, all working in the vineyards of the Lords von Boyneburg-Hohenstein. The vineyards, all 165.5 acres ( 67 hectares ) of them, have been preserved since 1978 as a local nature reserve.

In the 11th century, the Werratal was the boundary between the Electorate of Mainz and the Guelph dukes and therefore contested. Jestädt itself belonged to the Counts of Everstein but it later passed to the Northeim Counts von Northeim. Its new owner, Otto von Northeim, the Duke of Bavaria, however, died in 1083 before he could take formal possession. His son, Siegfried III, Graf [ Count ] von Boyneburg, finally gained the control of Jestädt.

In 1410 Bernhard I of the Boyneburg-Hohensteins was given the hereditary ownership and authority of the village of Jestädt by the Duke of Brunswick-Göttingen, Otto II. But, at least since 1567, the Boyneburg-Hohensteins had had to work for the Landgraves of Hesse-Kassel ( except for the years of the French occupation ) until 1866, when the entire landgraviate was annexed by Prussia after the Seven Weeks War.

During the Thirty Years War, Jestädt, like the rest of the Werratal, suffered. At first, because the Lords von Boyneburg-Hohenstein had bought letters of protection, it was left alone by the Imperial armies of Generals von Tilly in 1623 and von Wallenstein in 1625. But, in 1637, when the Croats came, they torched the village, burning 17 houses to the ground, and many of the residents fled to the Eichsfeld. Next came the Swedish and French troops in 1646, when they were withdrawing through the Werratal. In Jestädt, they used the village church as their barn for their horses and burned all its benches and pews. It got so bad that, in the church, "one could see through the roof and count the stars [ man von unten durch das Dach sehen und die Sterne zählen konnte ]." It was just as bad for the residents. In 1638 only one child was born and the next birth did not come until 1643, when twelve more were born.

But Jestädt had always been small. It had only 66 households in 1586 and 68 in 1747. Its population was only 502 people in 86 houses for 1822 and 584 in 87 houses for 1843 but it was enough to support a leather factory, beekeeping, tobacco and fruit farms, a grounding mill, a forester's office, and a gypsum quarry. Averaging about 573 residents every year since 1834, Jestädt did not reach 900 until 1946, a year after the end of World War II.

On 31 December 1971 the previously independent municipality of Jestädt was incorporated into the new municipality of Meinhard.

=== Political Administration ===
- 1567–1803 : Landgraviate of Hesse-Kassel, (since 1585) Amt [ County of ] Eschwege
- 1803–1807 : Electorate of the Hesse, Amt Eschwege
- 1807–1814 : ( French Occupation ) Kingdom of Westphalia, District of Heiligenstadt, Canton of Allendorf
- 1814–1821 : Electorate of the Hesse, Amt Eschwege
- 1821–1848 : Electorate of the Hesse, Province of Niederhessen, Kreis [ District of ] Eschwege, Amt Eschwege
- 1848–1852 : Electorate of the Hesse, Bezirk [ District of ] Eschwege, Amt Eschwege
- 1852–1866 : Electorate of the Hesse, Province of Niederhessen, Kreis Eschwege, Amt Eschwege
- 1866–1918 : Kingdom of Prussia, Province of Hesse-Nassau, Regierungsbezirk [ Administrative Region of ] Kassel, Landkreis [ District of ] Eschwege
- 1918–1945 : Germany, Province of Hessen-Nassau, Regierungsbezirk Kassel, Kreis ( since 1939, Landkreis ) Eschwege
- 1945–1946 : ( American Occupation ) Germany, State of Greater Hesse, Regierungsbezirk Kassel, Landkreis Eschwege
- 1946–1971 : Germany, State of Hesse, Regierungsbezirk Kassel, Landkreis Eschwege
- 1971–1974 : Germany, State of Hesse, Regierungsbezirk Kassel, Landkreis Eschwege, Gemeinde [ Municipality of ] Meinhard
- 1974–2013 : Germany, State of Hesse, Regierungsbezirk Kassel, Werra-Meißner-Kreis, Gemeinde Meinard

== Politics ==
The Ortsvorsteher ( Village Mayor ) of Jestädt is Gerhold Brill (Independent), as of June 2013.

== Schloss Jestädt ==
The Schloss [Castle] Jestädt was built on the walls of an old Talburg [ "valley castle" ], west of the village of Jestädt, by Walrab von Boyneburg-Hohenstein between 1558 and 1561 after he retired as a colonel from the French Army. His son Friedrich Hermann von Boyneburg-Hohenstein (1564–1631) expanded the castle in 1612. During the Thirty Years War, the castle was plundered and destroyed. However it was renovated in 1637 and became the family estate of the Boyneburg noble family.

When the Jestädt branch of the family died out in 1792, the castle and its surroundings fell to the Lords of Eschwege. The transfer of these properties was confirmed in 1802 with a deed of gift from the Elector of Brunswick-Lüneburg, King George III of the United Kingdom.

Later on, the prison tower and the east wing of the castle were removed. The castle was remodelled for the last time in 1906. The mill, on the south side of the castle, was demolished in the 1960s.

After World War II, refugees from Eschwege and their relatives stayed in the castle, but in the 1970s and 1980s, the castle was temporarily uninhabited.

The castle was bought in 1990 and restored by 1998. Since 1999 four apartments in the castle are inhabited. In the courtyard, as well as the hall, concerts are held.

== Other Sights ==
- Round village green
- Village church, whose oldest part, the nave, dates from 1588
- Burg Fürstenstein, a private residence
- Oldest timber house in the Werratal, built in 1586
- Oldest Jewish cemetery in Hesse, with the first tombstones dating from 1645

== Sons and Daughters of the Village ==
- Friedrich Rudolf Ernst Freiherr von Feilitzsch, first Minister-President of the Principality of Schaumburg-Lippe, was born on 14 July 1858 in Jestädt.
