= Steinheuterode =

- Ortsteil of Uder
- Coat of arms
- Interactive map of Steinheuterode
- Location within Germany Location within Thuringia
- Coordinates: 51°22′51″N 10°4′6″E
- Country: Germany
- State: Thuringia
- District: Eichsfeld
- Municipality: Uder

Area
  - Total: 2.53 km^{2} (0.98 sq mi)
- Elevation: 275 m (902 ft)

Population (2022-12-31)
  - Total: 293
  - Density: 116/km^{2} (300/sq mi)
- Time zone: UTC+01:00 (CET)
  - Summer (DST): UTC+02:00 (CEST)
- Postal codes: 37318
- Dialling codes: 036083

Steinheuterode (German pronunciation: [ʃtaɪnhɔʏtəˈʁoːdə]) is a village and a former municipality in the district of Eichsfeld in Thuringia, in the center of Germany. On 1 January 2024 it became part of the municipality Uder.

== Location ==
It is located at an altitude of 316 m at the foot of the Steinberg hill, and is surrounded by forest. The houses are arranged around the St. Alban church and a community center.

== Coat of arms ==
In the center of Steinheuterode's coat of arms is a billygoat, which refers to the nickname of the inhabitants: Steintreeder Zeggenböcke. There is a golden oak leaf on the left, representing the location of the municipality in Eichsfeld. The stump in the foreground is symbolic of the establishment of the village as a clearance village. The mountain at the bottom represents the location of Steinheuterode, at the foot of the Steinberg.

== History ==
The first time the village was documented was in 1228, when it was called Hauwerterode. To distinguish it from the Eichsfeldian village Wüstheuterode, the prefix Stein was added. A manor was built in 1575 and in 1732 the fountain Regine was constructed in the courtyard of the manor, which today serves as a community center.
