= Krombach, Thuringia =

Krombach
- Municipality
- Location of Krombach within Eichsfeld district
- Interactive map of Krombach
- Location within Germany Location within Thuringia
- Coordinates: 51°17′25″N 10°8′5″E
- Country: Germany
- State: Thuringia
- District: Eichsfeld
- Municipal assoc.: Ershausen/Geismar

Government
  - Mayor (2022–28): Markus Kitsche

Area
  - Total: 4.19 km^{2} (1.62 sq mi)
- Elevation: 350 m (1,150 ft)

Population (2025-12-31)
  - Total: 166
  - Density: 39.6/km^{2} (103/sq mi)
- Time zone: UTC+01:00 (CET)
  - Summer (DST): UTC+02:00 (CEST)
- Postal codes: 37308
- Dialling codes: 036082
- Vehicle registration: EIC
- Website: www.ershausen-geismar.de

Krombach is a municipality in the district of Eichsfeld in Thuringia, Germany.
