= Lutter, Thuringia =

Lutter
- Ortsteil of Uder
- Coat of arms
- Interactive map of Lutter
- Location within Germany Location within Thuringia
- Coordinates: 51°19′56″N 10°6′55″E
- Country: Germany
- State: Thuringia
- District: Eichsfeld
- Municipality: Uder

Area
  - Total: 9.86 km^{2} (3.81 sq mi)
- Elevation: 325 m (1,066 ft)

Population (2022-12-31)
  - Total: 719
  - Density: 72.9/km^{2} (189/sq mi)
- Time zone: UTC+01:00 (CET)
  - Summer (DST): UTC+02:00 (CEST)
- Postal codes: 37318
- Dialling codes: 036083

Lutter (German pronunciation: [ˈlʊtɐ]) is a village and a former municipality in the district of Eichsfeld in Thuringia, Germany. On 1 January 2024 it became part of the municipality Uder.
