= Birkenfelde =

- Ortsteil of Uder
- Coat of arms
- Interactive map of Birkenfelde
- Location within Germany Location within Thuringia
- Coordinates: 51°21′13″N 10°0′54″E
- Country: Germany
- State: Thuringia
- District: Eichsfeld
- Municipality: Uder

Area
  - Total: 8.39 km^{2} (3.24 sq mi)
- Elevation: 285 m (935 ft)

Population (2022-12-31)
  - Total: 529
  - Density: 63.1/km^{2} (163/sq mi)
- Time zone: UTC+01:00 (CET)
  - Summer (DST): UTC+02:00 (CEST)
- Postal codes: 37318
- Dialling codes: 036083

Birkenfelde (German pronunciation: [bɪʁkn̩ˈfɛldə]) is a village and a former municipality in the district of Eichsfeld, in Thuringia, Germany. On 1 January 2024 it became part of the municipality Uder.
