= Schönhagen Airfield =

Schönhagen Airfield Flugplatz Schönhagen

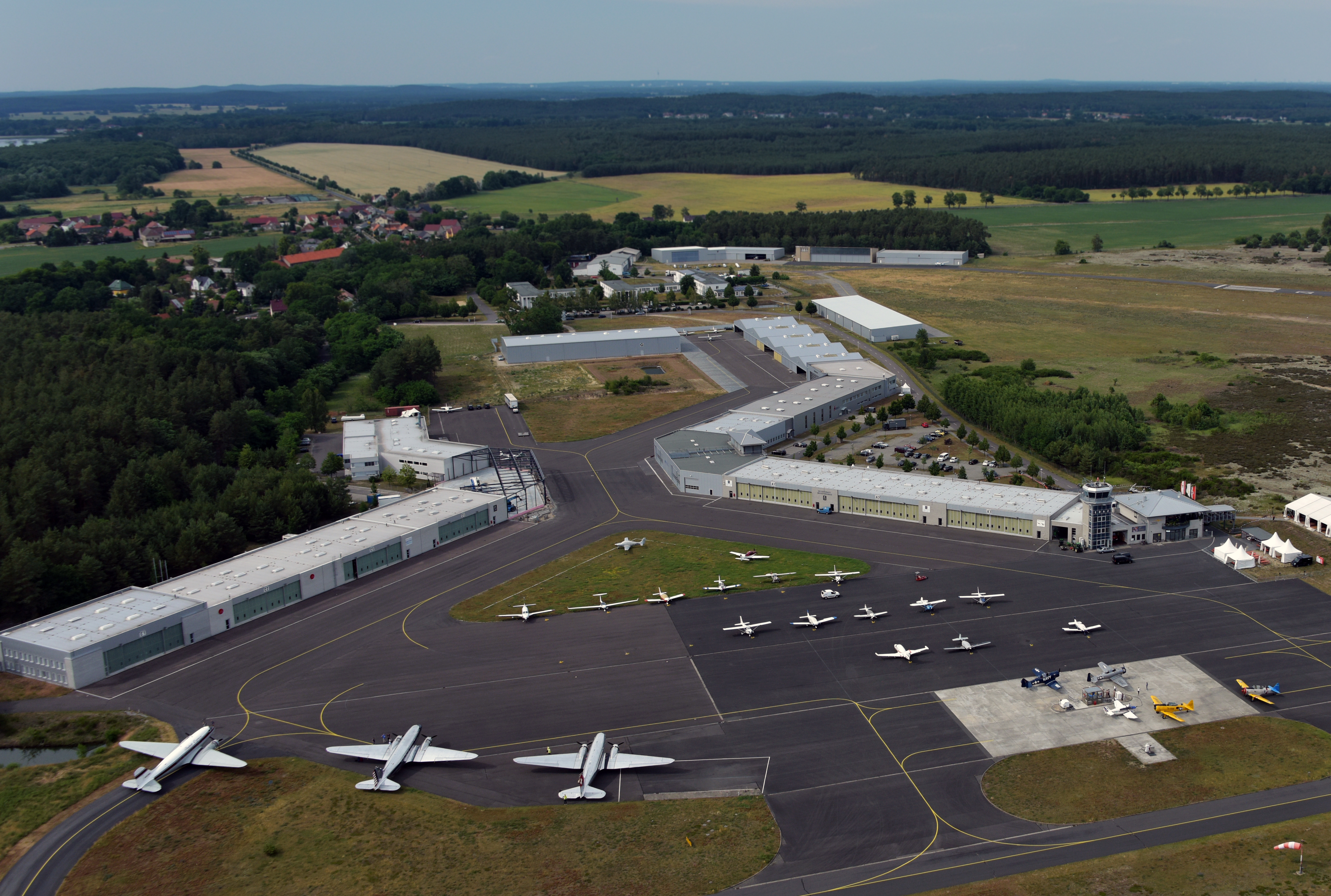
- IATA: QXH; ICAO: EDAZ

Summary
- Airport type: Public
- Operator: Flugplatzgesellschaft Schönhagen mbH
- Serves: Berlin, Germany
- Location: Schönhagen
- Elevation AMSL: 135 ft (41 m)
- Coordinates: 52°12′14″N 013°09′36″E
- Website: flugplatz-schoenhagen.aero

Map
- Location of airfield in Brandenburg, Germany

Runways
Direction	Length		Surface
Direction	m	ft	Surface
07/25	1,510	4,954	Asphalt

Schönhagen Airfield (German: Flugplatz Schönhagen) (IATA: QXH, ICAO: EDAZ) is a general aviation aerodrome near Trebbin, in the German state of Brandenburg. It is located approximately 45 km (28 mi) southwest of Berlin.

== History ==
Since 1928 the area around Löwendorfer Berg has been used for gliding. The Luftwaffe der Wehrmacht, which expanded the area from 1936, used Trebbin Air Base as an emergency landing site, no flying units were stationed there. Between 1937 and 1945 a "Reichsschule für Segelflug" of the National Socialist Flyers Corps was located at Schönhagen, operating gliders.

In GDR times the site was home to the school combine named "Ernst Schneller" of the Gesellschaft für Sport und Technik which among other things provided basic pilot training in preparation for military pilot training with the NVA. On 31 January 1952 Karl Liebeskind performed the first take-off of an aircraft in the GDR with a SG 38 in Schönhagen.

After the fall of the Iron Curtain, the airfield was and is being continuously expanded. Both runways were asphalted, the main runway was extended and equipped with a navigation light system.

On 24 November 2008, the last aircraft taking off from Tempelhof landed in Schönhagen

Most traffic these days is from helicopters and private business planes.

== Facilities ==
The airfield is licensed for aeroplanes up to 14.000 kilograms (30.865 lb) maximum takeoff weight. It has one runway designated 07/25 with an asphalt surface measuring 1,510 by 30 metres (4,954 ft × 98 ft), one runway designated 12/30 with an asphalt surface measuring 700 by 30 metres (2,297 ft × 98 ft) and one runway designated 12/30 with a grass surface measuring 760 by 45 metres (2,493 ft × 148 ft).

== See also ==
- Transport in Germany
- List of airports in Germany
