= Volkerode =

- Municipality
- Coat of arms

- Location of Volkerode within Eichsfeld district
- Interactive map of Volkerode
- Location within Germany Location within Thuringia
- Coordinates: 51°15′29″N 10°4′37″E
- Country: Germany
- State: Thuringia
- District: Eichsfeld
- Municipal assoc.: Ershausen/Geismar

Government
  - Mayor (2019–25): Andreas Pudenz

Area
  - Total: 6.88 km^{2} (2.66 sq mi)
- Elevation: 330 m (1,080 ft)

Population (2025-12-31)
  - Total: 236
  - Density: 34.3/km^{2} (88.8/sq mi)
- Time zone: UTC+01:00 (CET)
  - Summer (DST): UTC+02:00 (CEST)
- Postal codes: 37308
- Dialling codes: 036082
- Vehicle registration: EIC
- Website: www.ershausen-geismar.de

Volkerode is a municipality in the district of Eichsfeld in Thuringia, Germany.
