= Uder =

- Municipality
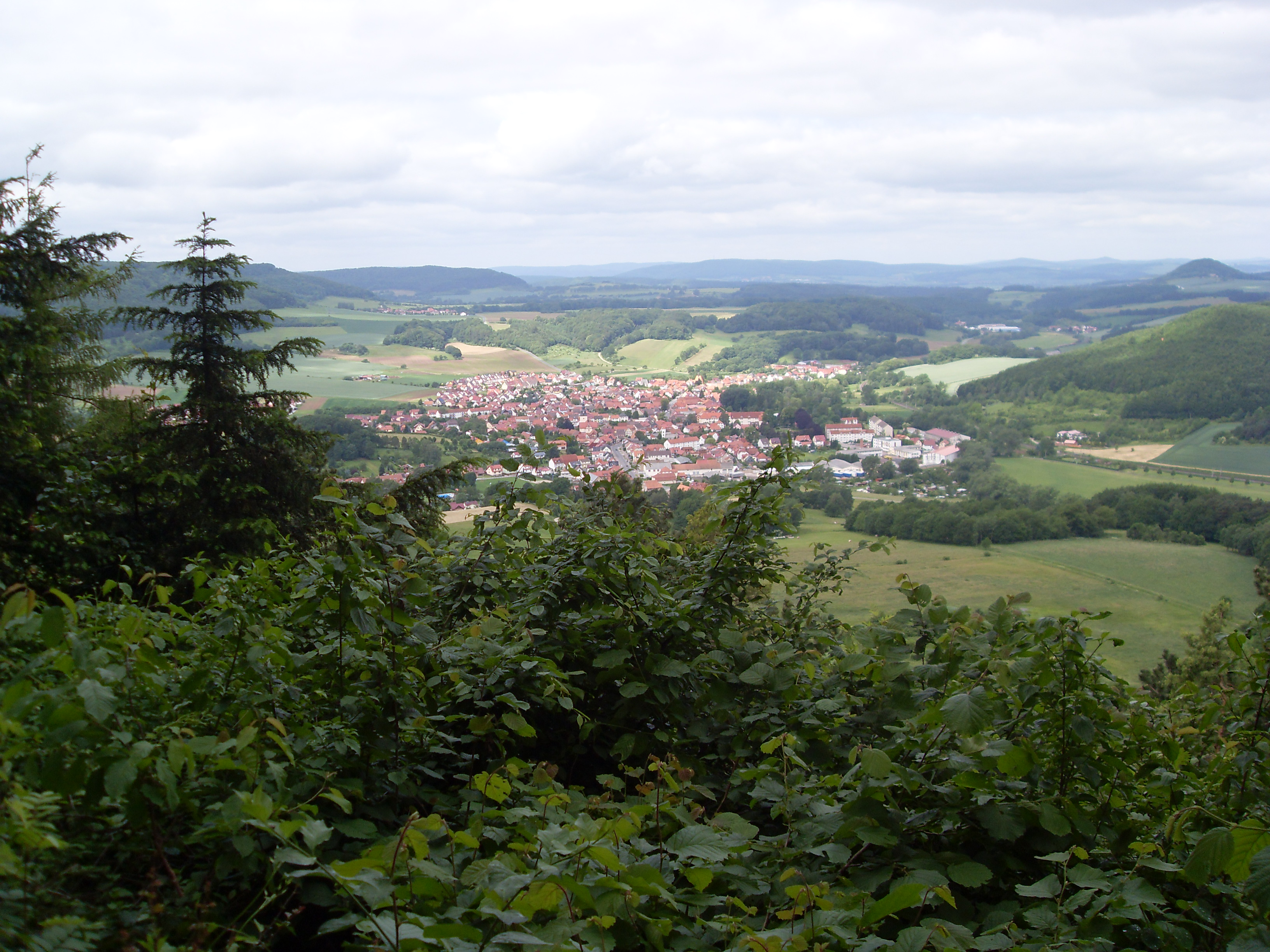

- Coat of arms

- Location of Uder within Eichsfeld district
- Interactive map of Uder
- Location within Germany Location within Thuringia
- Coordinates: 51°21′45″N 10°4′17″E
- Country: Germany
- State: Thuringia
- District: Eichsfeld

Government
  - Mayor (2024–30): Rita Spies (CDU)

Area
  - Total: 57.8 km^{2} (22.3 sq mi)
- Elevation: 230 m (750 ft)

Population (2025-12-31)
  - Total: 6,134
  - Density: 106/km^{2} (275/sq mi)
- Time zone: UTC+01:00 (CET)
  - Summer (DST): UTC+02:00 (CEST)
- Postal codes: 37318
- Dialling codes: 036083, 036087
- Vehicle registration: EIC
- Website: www.lg-uder.de

Uder (German pronunciation: [ˈuːdɐ]) is a municipality in the district of Eichsfeld in Thuringia, Germany. On 1 January 2024, the former municipality Uder was merged with the former municipalities Birkenfelde, Eichstruth, Lenterode, Lutter, Mackenrode, Röhrig, Schönhagen, Steinheuterode, Thalwenden and Wüstheuterode to form the current municipality Uder.
