= Röhrig =

- Ortsteil of Uder
- Interactive map of Röhrig
- Location within Germany Location within Thuringia
- Coordinates: 51°20′4″N 10°2′33″E
- Country: Germany
- State: Thuringia
- District: Eichsfeld
- Municipality: Uder

Area
  - Total: 2.8 km^{2} (1.1 sq mi)
- Elevation: 350 m (1,150 ft)

Population (2022-12-31)
  - Total: 221
  - Density: 79/km^{2} (200/sq mi)
- Time zone: UTC+01:00 (CET)
  - Summer (DST): UTC+02:00 (CEST)
- Postal codes: 37318
- Dialling codes: 036087

Röhrig (German pronunciation: [ˈʁøːʁɪç]) is a village and a former municipality in the district of Eichsfeld in Thuringia, Germany. On 1 January 2024 it became part of the municipality Uder.
