= Schwobfeld =

- Municipality
- Coat of arms

- Location of Schwobfeld within Eichsfeld district
- Interactive map of Schwobfeld
- Location within Germany Location within Thuringia
- Coordinates: 51°17′13″N 10°5′31″E
- Country: Germany
- State: Thuringia
- District: Eichsfeld
- Municipal assoc.: Ershausen/Geismar

Government
  - Mayor (2022–28): Andreas Müller

Area
  - Total: 2.50 km^{2} (0.97 sq mi)
- Elevation: 355 m (1,165 ft)

Population (2025-12-31)
  - Total: 106
  - Density: 42.4/km^{2} (110/sq mi)
- Time zone: UTC+01:00 (CET)
  - Summer (DST): UTC+02:00 (CEST)
- Postal codes: 37318
- Dialling codes: 036082
- Vehicle registration: EIC
- Website: www.ershausen-geismar.de

Schwobfeld is a municipality in the district of Eichsfeld in Thuringia, Germany.
