= Frieda (Werra) =

River in Germany

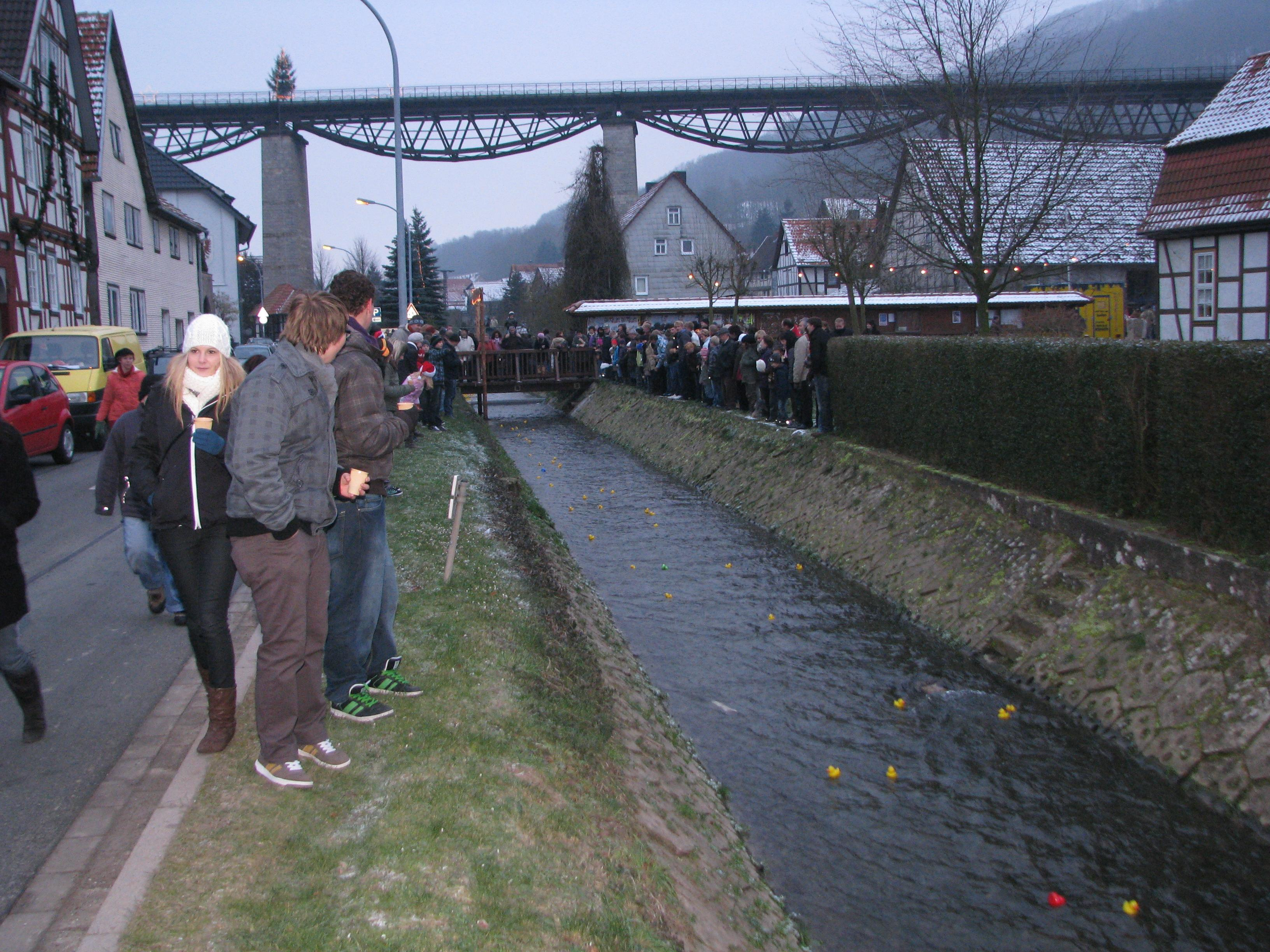

Location
- Country: Germany
- States: Thuringia and Hesse

Physical characteristics
- Mouth
  - location: Werra
  - coordinates: 51.1880°N 10.1289°E
- Basin size: 173 km^{2} (67 sq mi)

Basin features
- Progression: Werra→ Weser→ North Sea

The Frieda is a river of Thuringia and Hesse, in Germany. It joins the Werra in the village Frieda. After heavy rainfall, it can swell into a fast-running river that can erode the bank of the Werra.

== See also ==
- List of rivers of Hesse
- List of rivers of Thuringia
