= Lenterode =

- Ortsteil of Uder
- Interactive map of Lenterode
- Location within Germany Location within Thuringia
- Coordinates: 51°20′28″N 10°4′4″E
- Country: Germany
- State: Thuringia
- District: Eichsfeld
- Municipality: Uder

Area
  - Total: 4.26 km^{2} (1.64 sq mi)
- Elevation: 275 m (902 ft)

Population (2022-12-31)
  - Total: 312
  - Density: 73.2/km^{2} (190/sq mi)
- Time zone: UTC+01:00 (CET)
  - Summer (DST): UTC+02:00 (CEST)
- Postal codes: 37318
- Dialling codes: 036083

Lenterode (German pronunciation: [lɛntəˈʁoːdə]) is a village and a former municipality in the district of Eichsfeld in Thuringia, Germany. On 1 January 2024 it became part of the municipality Uder.
