= Pfaffschwende =

- Municipality
- Coat of arms

- Location of Pfaffschwende within Eichsfeld district
- Interactive map of Pfaffschwende
- Location within Germany Location within Thuringia
- Coordinates: 51°14′53″N 10°5′52″E
- Country: Germany
- State: Thuringia
- District: Eichsfeld
- Municipal assoc.: Ershausen/Geismar

Government
  - Mayor (2022–28): Mario Kaufhold

Area
  - Total: 4.03 km^{2} (1.56 sq mi)
- Elevation: 350 m (1,150 ft)

Population (2025-12-31)
  - Total: 291
  - Density: 72.2/km^{2} (187/sq mi)
- Time zone: UTC+01:00 (CET)
  - Summer (DST): UTC+02:00 (CEST)
- Postal codes: 37308
- Dialling codes: 036082
- Vehicle registration: EIC
- Website: www.pfaffschwende.de

Pfaffschwende is a municipality in the district of Eichsfeld in Thuringia, Germany.
