= Mackenrode, Thuringia =

Mackenrode
- Ortsteil of Uder
- Coat of arms
- Interactive map of Mackenrode
- Location within Germany Location within Thuringia
- Coordinates: 51°18′19″N 10°4′5″E
- Country: Germany
- State: Thuringia
- District: Eichsfeld
- Municipality: Uder

Area
  - Total: 3.8 km^{2} (1.5 sq mi)
- Elevation: 280 m (920 ft)

Population (2022-12-31)
  - Total: 305
  - Density: 80/km^{2} (210/sq mi)
- Time zone: UTC+01:00 (CET)
  - Summer (DST): UTC+02:00 (CEST)
- Postal codes: 37318
- Dialling codes: 036087
- Website: lg-uder.de

Mackenrode (German pronunciation: [makn̩ˈʁoːdə]) is a village and a former municipality in the district of Eichsfeld in Thuringia, Germany. On 1 January 2024 it became part of the municipality Uder.
