= Geismar =

- Municipality
- Location of Geismar within Eichsfeld district
- Interactive map of Geismar
- Location within Germany Location within Thuringia
- Coordinates: 51°13′53″N 10°9′59″E
- Country: Germany
- State: Thuringia
- District: Eichsfeld
- Municipal assoc.: Ershausen/Geismar

Government
  - Mayor (2022–28): Martin Kozber (CDU)

Area
  - Total: 19.32 km^{2} (7.46 sq mi)
- Elevation: 210 m (690 ft)

Population (2025-12-31)
  - Total: 1,045
  - Density: 54.09/km^{2} (140.1/sq mi)
- Time zone: UTC+01:00 (CET)
  - Summer (DST): UTC+02:00 (CEST)
- Postal codes: 37308
- Dialling codes: 036082
- Vehicle registration: EIC
- Website: www.ershausen-geismar.de

Geismar is a municipality in the district of Eichsfeld in Thuringia, Germany.
