= Eichstruth =

- Ortsteil of Uder
- Interactive map of Eichstruth
- Location within Germany Location within Thuringia
- Coordinates: 51°18′18″N 10°4′54″E
- Country: Germany
- State: Thuringia
- District: Eichsfeld
- Municipality: Uder

Area
  - Total: 1.33 km^{2} (0.51 sq mi)
- Elevation: 345 m (1,132 ft)

Population (2022-12-31)
  - Total: 83
  - Density: 62/km^{2} (160/sq mi)
- Time zone: UTC+01:00 (CET)
  - Summer (DST): UTC+02:00 (CEST)
- Postal codes: 37318
- Dialling codes: 036087

Eichstruth (German pronunciation: [ˈaɪçstʁuːt]) is a village and a former municipality in the district of Eichsfeld in Thuringia, Germany. By area, it was the smallest municipality in what was East Germany. On 1 January 2024 it became part of the municipality Uder.
