= Wüstheuterode =

- Ortsteil of Uder
- Coat of arms
- Interactive map of Wüstheuterode
- Location within Germany Location within Thuringia
- Coordinates: 51°19′14″N 10°3′38″E
- Country: Germany
- State: Thuringia
- District: Eichsfeld
- Municipality: Uder

Area
  - Total: 4.93 km^{2} (1.90 sq mi)
- Elevation: 395 m (1,296 ft)

Population (2022-12-31)
  - Total: 565
  - Density: 115/km^{2} (297/sq mi)
- Time zone: UTC+01:00 (CET)
  - Summer (DST): UTC+02:00 (CEST)
- Postal codes: 37318
- Dialling codes: 036087

Wüstheuterode (German pronunciation: [vyːsthɔʏtəˈʁoːdə]) is a village and a former municipality in the district of Eichsfeld in Thuringia, Germany. On 1 January 2024 it became part of the municipality Uder.
