= Schönhagen, Thuringia =

Schönhagen
- Ortsteil of Uder
- Coat of arms
- Interactive map of Schönhagen
- Location within Germany Location within Thuringia
- Coordinates: 51°20′24″N 10°1′13″E
- Country: Germany
- State: Thuringia
- District: Eichsfeld
- Municipality: Uder

Area
  - Total: 2.54 km^{2} (0.98 sq mi)
- Elevation: 325 m (1,066 ft)

Population (2022-12-31)
  - Total: 143
  - Density: 56.3/km^{2} (146/sq mi)
- Time zone: UTC+01:00 (CET)
  - Summer (DST): UTC+02:00 (CEST)
- Postal codes: 37318
- Dialling codes: 036083

Schönhagen (German pronunciation: [ʃøːnˈhaɡn̩]) is a village and a former municipality in the district of Eichsfeld in Thuringia, Germany. On 1 January 2024 it became part of the municipality Uder.
