= Marie Joséphine of Savoy =

- Countess of Provence
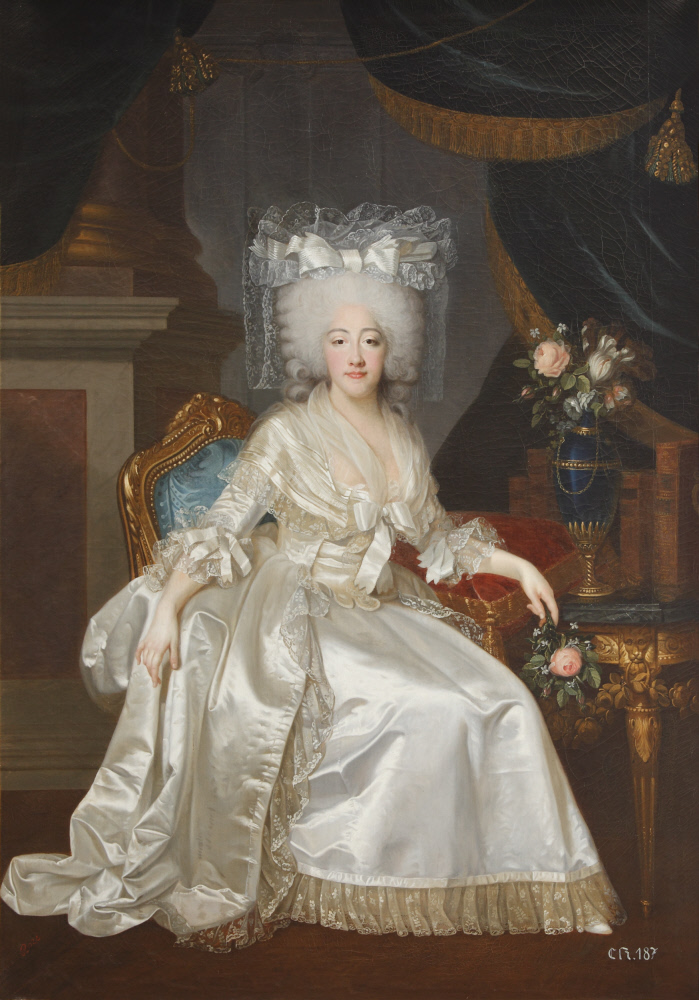
- Portrait by Joseph Boze, 1786

Titular queen consort of France (wife of claimant)
- Tenure: 8 June 1795 (Note: In his official acts as king, Louis XVIII dated the years of his reign from 1795, when his nephew Louis XVII died.) – 13 November 1810
- Born: 2 September 1753; Royal Palace of Turin, Turin
- Died: 13 November 1810 (aged 57); Hartwell House, Buckinghamshire, England
- Burial: Lady Chapel, Westminster Abbey, London (1810–1811); Cagliari Cathedral, Cagliari (since 1811)
- Spouse: Louis XVIII (m. 1771)
Names
- Italian: Maria Giuseppina Luisa; French: Marie Joséphine Louise
- House: Savoy
- Father: Victor Amadeus III of Sardinia
- Mother: Maria Antonia Ferdinanda of Spain

Marie Joséphine of Savoy (Italian: Maria Giuseppina Luisa; 2 September 1753 – 13 November 1810) was a princess of France and Countess of Provence by marriage to the future King Louis XVIII of France. She was regarded by Bourbon royalist Legitimists as the titular 'Queen of France' when her husband assumed the title of king in 1795 upon the death of his nephew, the titular King Louis XVII of France, until her death. She was never practically queen, as she died before her husband actually became king in 1814.

== Early life and marriage (1753–1773) ==
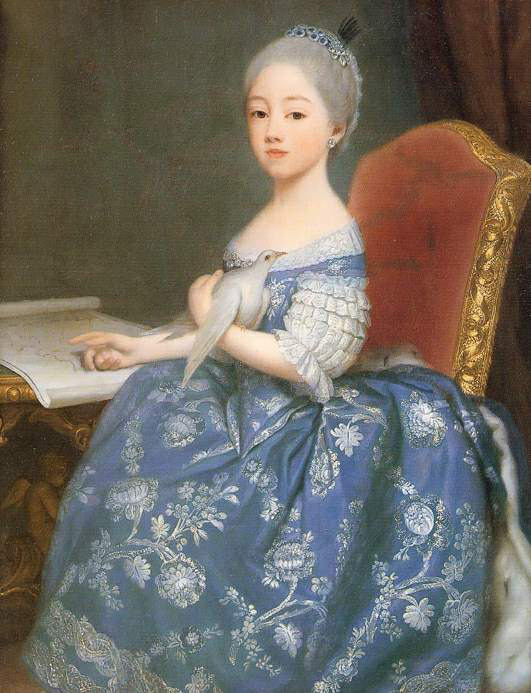
Marie Joséphine as a child (by Giuseppe Duprà)

Marie Joséphine was born at the Royal Palace of Turin on 2 September 1753 as the third child and second daughter of Prince Victor Amadeus of Savoy and Infanta Maria Antonia Ferdinanda of Spain. At the time of her birth, her paternal grandfather, Charles Emmanuel III, was the King of Sardinia, thus her parents were styled Duke and Duchess of Savoy. Her brothers included the last three kings of Sardinia from the senior line of the House of Savoy: the future Charles Emmanuel IV, Victor Emmanuel I, and Charles Felix.

=== Marriage ===
Marie Joséphine was engaged to the French prince Louis Stanislas, the Count of Provence. Her aunts, Maria Luisa of Savoy and Eleonora of Savoy, were once proposed as brides for Louis Stanislas's father Louis Ferdinand.

Marie Joséphine was by view of rank and connections deemed very suitable for a marriage to a French prince, and she had been regarded as a suitable bride of the dauphin prior to his marriage in 1770. The marriage was supported by Madame du Barry, who wished to create an ally within the royal family and who the king allowed to form the household of the new princess with her allies, notably the Countess de Valentinois as the principal lady-in-waiting.

Marie Joséphine was married on 16 April 1771 by proxy in the Kingdom of Sardinia, then again in person on 14 May 1771 at the Palace of Versailles. The wedding ceremony by proxy, followed by a bedding ceremony and a banquet, was held at the Sardinian royal court in Turin, after which the bride crossed the Bridge of Beauvoisin between Savoy and France, where she left her Sabaudian entourage and was welcomed by her new French retinue. She was introduced to the French royal family and court at the Palace of Fontainebleau, where she was met by her cousin, the Princesse de Lamballe. A ball followed the wedding on 20 May.

The marriage was arranged as a part of a series of Franco-Sardinian dynastic marriages taking place in a time span of eight years: after the wedding between her first cousin the Princesse de Lamballe and Louis Alexandre de Bourbon, Prince of Lamballe, and the wedding between Marie Joséphine and Louis Stanislas, her younger sister Maria Theresa was married to her younger brother-in-law, the Count of Artois (future King Charles X of France) in 1773, and her eldest brother Prince Charles Emmanuel of Savoy (the future king of Sardinia) was married to her sister-in-law Princess Clotilde of France in 1775. Her eldest brother-in-law, Dauphin Louis Auguste (the future Louis XVI of France), had married Marie Antoinette one year earlier.

Her marriage to a Petit-fils de France (Grandson of France) allowed her to assume the rank of petite-fille de France (Granddaughter of France). At the death of her husband's grandfather Louis XV in 1774, her brother-in-law succeeded as Louis XVI; as the eldest brother of the king, her spouse took on the style Monsieur, and Marie Joséphine was thus under the reign of her brother-in-law known under the style of Madame.

== Countess of Provence (1773–1791) ==
Marie Joséphine in 1772 (by François-Hubert Drouais)

The marriage of Marie Joséphine had been deemed necessary by Louis XV because the dauphin had not consummated his marriage, and there may thus prove to be necessary to leave the task to provide the next heir to the throne to the Count of Provence, who was second in line in succession after his brother. The Franco-Sardinian marriage alliance was greatly disliked by Austria and Empress Maria Theresa, who feared that Marie Joséphine might gain influence upon Louis XV in France in favour of Sardinia, (which was the rival of Austria) in Northern Italy, and that she would undermine the position of the childless Marie Antoinette if she gave birth to an heir to the French throne while the marriage of the dauphin was still unconsummated.

Marie Joséphine received 300,000 livres' worth of jewels from Louis XV, three-quarters of the dauphine's casket, and from the Count of Provence his portrait as "a pledge of the sentiments that are engraved in my heart for you."

She did not make a good impression upon her arrival in France, and was described as small, plain, with sallow skin and what Louis XV called “a villainous nose”, and as a person as timid, gauche and "ill educated in all those graces considered so important at Versailles", coming from the more strict Sardinian court, where rouge was found repugnant. It was alleged that she never brushed her teeth, plucked her eyebrows, or used any perfumes. In order to rectify the bad impression of her appearance, the ambassador to France from Sardinia was required to ask her father to tell her about the necessity for a careful toilette, in particular with regard to her teeth and hair: “It is embarrassing for me to discuss such things, but these mere details to us are vital matters in this country”. After Madame du Barry told Marie-Josephine rouge would please her husband, she bought an ample supply and told her chief lady-in-waiting, the Countess de Valentinois, to apply it copiously, agreeing to adjust herself to the customs in France.

Her spouse Louis Stanislas, aware of the gossip surrounding the unconsummated marriage of his elder brother the dauphin, made a point of boasting of vigorous conjugal relations between him and his spouse, so as to avoid the widespread suspicions that their marriage was not consummated. Later in his life Louis Stanislas suffered from obesity—all existing painted portraits and engravings of him in 1771 show him to be of normal weight, and the idea that he was too obese to consummate his marriage is without historical supporting evidence. Marie Antoinette did dismiss the Count of Provence's boasting, and assured her mother that a consummation of his marriage “would need a miracle.” Some contemporaries thought Louis Stanislas reportedly proclaimed his wife to be pregnant merely to spite Louis Auguste and Marie Antoinette, who had not yet consummated their marriage. Years later the Sardinian ambassador to France reported that there was never a question of a physical union between them. Marie Joséphine herself reported in February 1772 that she was quite sure she was not pregnant “and it’s not my fault.” The first of two confirmed pregnancies occurred in 1774, indicating consummation between the years 1772 and 1774. Marie Joséphine reportedly suffered a miscarriage in 1774. A second pregnancy in 1781 also miscarried, and the marriage remained childless. During these first years of their marriage, the couple lived together in some affection, and Marie Antoinette commissioned a sketch by Jean-Honoré Fragonard where a couple sits in front of a fireplace with cotton caps and muffs in their laps: the sketch was meant to mock the Count and Countess with a motive which hinted that they preferred to live secluded together.

During her first years in France, the three royal couples - the count and countess of Provence, the count and countess of Artois, the Dauphin and Dauphine - as well as the princesse de Lamballe, who was the favorite of Marie Antoinette, formed a circle of friends and acted in amateur theater plays together, before an audience only consisting of the dauphin. During these years, the count and countess of Provence are frequently mentioned as accompanying the crown prince couple on sleigh rides, masquerades, opera performances and other entertainments. As the second lady of the French court after the queen, she alternated with the Mesdames de France in accompanying Marie Antoinette on official representational assignments.

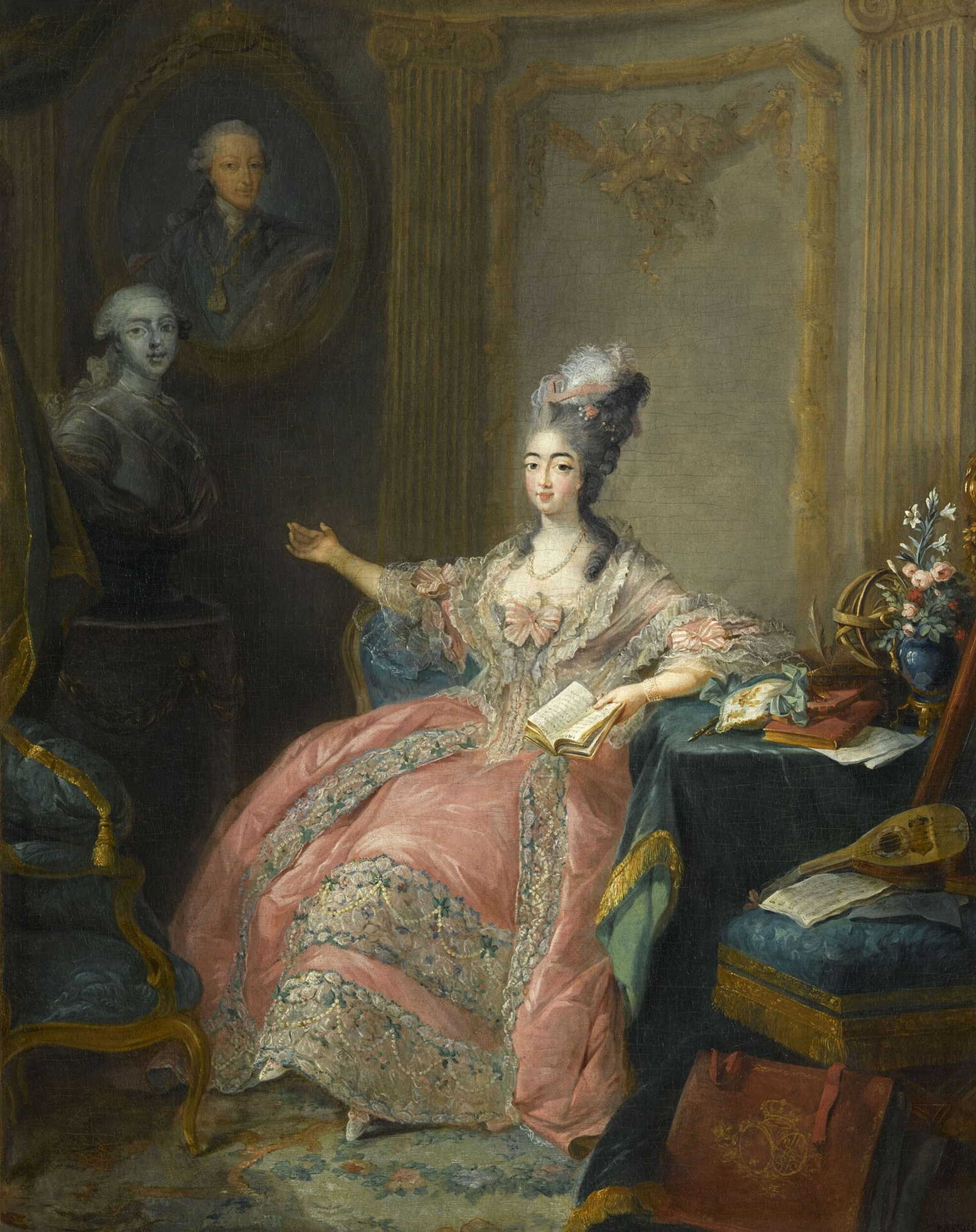
Portrait of Marie Joséphine in 1777, pointing to a bust of her husband

The seemingly good relationship between the four couples somewhat deteriorated, however, after the succession of Louis XVI to the throne in 1774.

Louis XVI and Louis Stanislas did not enjoy a harmonious relationship. They often quarreled, as did their wives. The Count of Provence actually challenged the legitimacy of Marie Antoinette's first child, and until the birth of a male heir by Marie Antoinette, he did everything in his power to promote himself and his wife as better fitted to be next-in-line for the throne. Without children or political influence, Marie Joséphine intrigued against the Queen, but without much success, while her spouse orchestrated a true country-wide opposition against her. She was well educated in literature - she had her own library installed in her apartments - and was estimated to have been of no small intelligence and with a good ability to accustom to court intrigues. The brother of Marie Antoinette, Emperor Joseph II, said of her during his visit to France in 1777 that she was "ugly and vulgar, not a Piedmontese for nothing, a mess of intrigues." After the first few years, the Count and countess of Provence lived largely separate lives. Louis Stanislas was reputed to have a romantic relationship with his favorite courtier, the Duke d'Avaray (other biographers, like Mansel and Sanders, believe it was a friendship and nothing more). Marie Joséphine for her part was reputed to have a romantic relationship with her favorite lady-in-waiting Marguerite de Gourbillon. She preferred to spend most of her time in her private retreat villa, the Pavillon Madame in Montreuil, on which she spent lavishly and constructed a fashionable model village with a pavilion of music, and a model village with twelve houses, dovecotes and windmills, a dairy made of marble with silver vessels, as well as allegorical temples consecrated to love and friendship, a hermitage and a belvedere.

Prior to the meeting of the Estates General, every member of the royal family was publicly mocked by libelous verses, in which Marie Joséphine was satirized for her alleged alcoholism.

=== Revolution ===
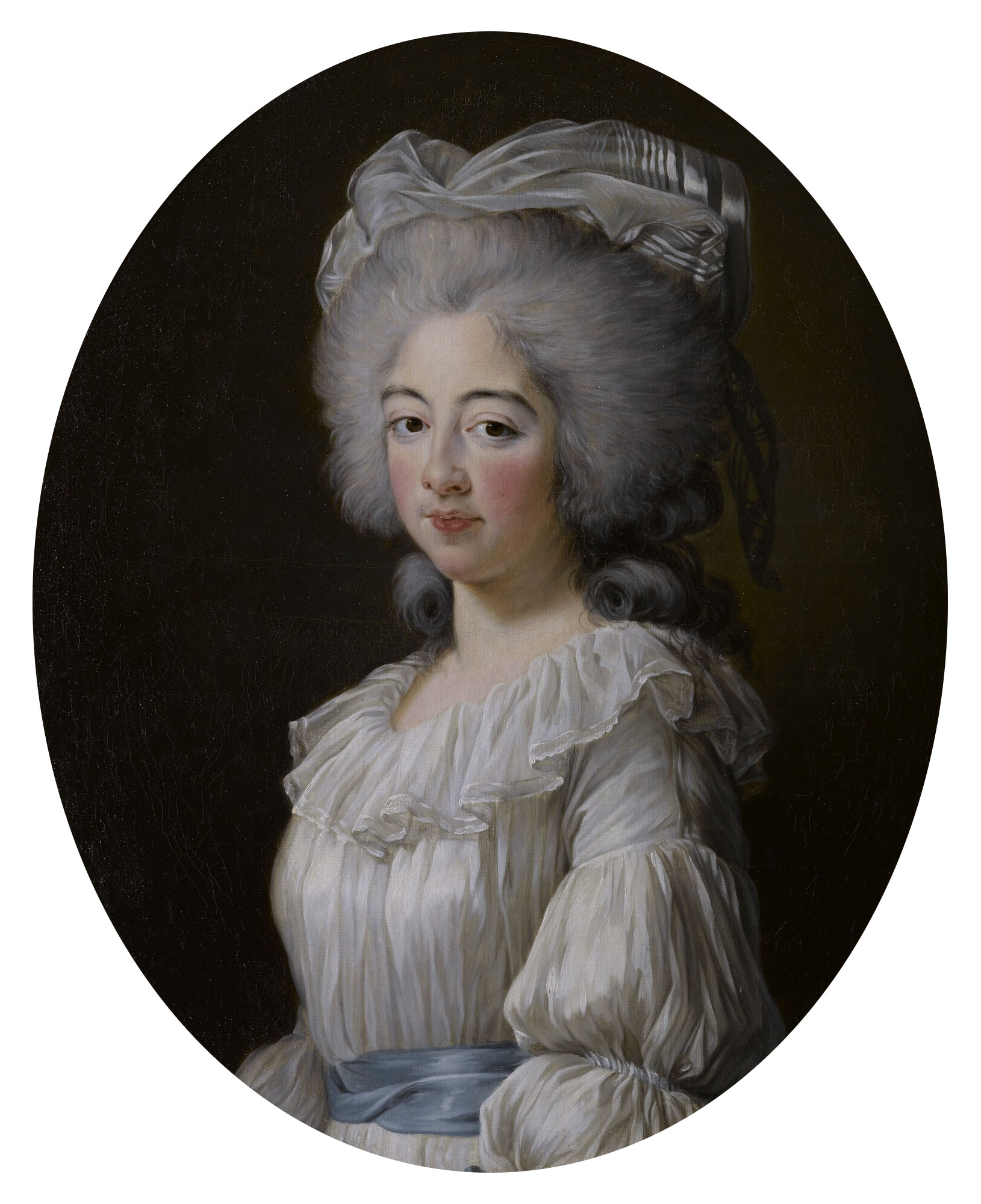
Marie Joséphine in 1782 (by Élisabeth Vigée Le Brun)

In contrast to her sister and brother-in-law the count and countess of Artois, who left France soon after the Storming of the Bastille in July 1789, the count and countess of Provence remained in France after the outbreak of the revolution. They were present at the Palace of Versailles during The Women's March on Versailles, which took place on 5 October 1789.

After the Women's March, they were forced to move to Paris along with Louis XVI and Marie Antoinette. However, while the rest of the royal family stayed in the Tuileries Palace, Marie Joséphine and her spouse lodged in the Luxembourg Palace, which was their normal city residence in Paris. They regularly attended court in the Tuileries and were also present at the evening family suppers, where Marie Joséphine was described as humorous and entertained with character reading of people's faces. Their presence was welcomed by the queen at this point, as Marie Antoinette came to distrust strangers for political reasons and turned to her family for company.

Already in November 1790, the count of Provence made plans for him and his spouse to leave France, but the plans were complicated because it was deemed necessary to leave at the same time as the king and queen, as it was considered dangerous to remain in France after their departure, but risky for the king and queen if the Provence party were to leave before them. Therefore, Provence made sure to ascertain the time plan for the departure of the king, although the escape plans of the two parties were otherwise made separately. Provence planned the escape in cooperation with his favorites Anne de Balbi and d'Avaray; Marie Joséphine was not informed of the plans because she was considered to lack self-control, but her favorite Gourbillon was informed so as to make all arrangements around her departure. In February 1791, a crowd gathered outside the Luxembourg, alarmed by rumours of a planned escape, and a delegation of women were sent in, to which Provence assured that he had no such plans. On 2 June, de Balbi left for Brussels, leaving an English passport issued for a Monsieur and Mademoiselle Foster, which would be altered by d'Avaray to suit their purpose. When the queen informed Provence of the date of the departure of the king's party, their escape plan could be set in action.

In June 1791, the Provence couple successfully escaped to the Austrian Netherlands in the same operation that led to the royal family's failure, the Flight to Varennes. On the 20 June, Marie Joséphine attended a dinner with the royal family at the Tuileries with her spouse. On that night, she was awoken in her bed by Gourbillon who announced that she was ordered by the king and her husband to leave the country at once, and swiftly taken to her designed rented carriage by Gourbillon, while Louis Stanislas left with d'Avaray to a different carriage. The escape of the Provence couple was more successful than the royal couple's, as they left separately and more discreetly. Louis Stanislas left dressed as an English merchant only accompanied by his favorite d'Avraye and travelled by route of Soissons, Laon and Maubeuge to Madame de Balbi in Mons, while Marie Joséphine travelled via the northerly road by Douai and Orchies with her favorite Gourbillon. They each passed the border with no difficulty whatsoever, and reunited in Namur.

== Exile and death (1791–1810) ==
From Namur, Marie Joséphine followed Louis Stanislas to Brussels in the Austrian Netherlands, where they reunited with the count of Artois. Provence and Artois unsuccessfully asked the governor of the Austrian Netherlands, Maria Christina, Duchess of Teschen, to intervene with military force across the border before the king and queen, whose party had been arrested, could be brought back to Paris, but she refused as she needed the permission from the emperor to do so, by which time it was already too late.

After a meeting with Gustav III of Sweden at Aachen, they continued via Bonn to Koblenz, where they were welcomed by their uncle, the Archbishop-Elector Clemens Wenceslaus of Saxony, who gave them the Palace of Schönbornslust to their disposal, and where they installed their émigrée court in exile. Louis Stanislas, who proclaimed himself regent, installed a court life regulated by the court etiquette of the ancien régime, in which Marie Joséphine had a ceremonial role to play. Koblenz was full of French royalist émigrés, and the social life was described as hectic and extravagant, with regular receptions by the Elector and the Princes. However, though formally the first lady of the emigree court, Marie Joséphine seems to have been eclipsed by the aristocratic female émigrés termed as the 'Queens of the Emigration', namely the Prince of Condé's mistress, Maria Caterina Brignole, her brother-in-law's mistress, Louise de Polastron, and the mistress of her own husband, her lady-in-waiting Countess Anne de Balbi, who was courted for her influence over Louis Stanislas.

Early on, Marie Joséphine prepared to separate from her husband and return to her birth country. Already on 25 July 1791 the Duke of Genevois wrote in his journal that she was coming home to the court of her father in Turin:

"Piedmont has told me, that Madame is coming here, but that the King insists on her coming alone.... Anyhow, one thing is certain — where she is at present, she is starving and without a penny."

She was asked to come without her spouse, as her father was already in a difficult diplomatic situation with the French government due to the great number of aristocratic émigrés in Sardinia. She was duly welcomed in her former home country in early 1792.

Her husband, who had lived in Hamm in Westphalia since the émigré court had been dissolved after the Battle of Valmy, visited her in Turin between December 1793 to May 1794 before continuing to Verona, but she did not join him there. On 8 June 1795, the only surviving son of Louis XVI and Marie Antoinette, referred to by the legitimists as 'Louis XVII of France', died while imprisoned in the Temple, and on 16 June, the exiled French royalists proclaimed the count of Provence king of France as Louis XVIII. Thus, Marie Joséphine became regarded as titular queen consort of France by the legitimists. In the court of Turin, Marie Joséphine came to be regarded as queen and her sister Maria Theresa as 'Madame', but to avoid provocation of the diplomatic relations between France and Sardinia, she officially stayed in Turin incognito as 'countess of Lille'.

In April 1796, when Sardinia was defeated by France under Napoleon Bonaparte during the Italian campaigns of the French Revolutionary Wars, Marie Joséphine and her sister Maria Theresa left Turin for Novara, in parallel with the departure of Marie Joséphine's husband from Verona. While her sister returned to Turin after the peace between France and Sardinia in May, Marie Joséphine continued to Austria and settled with Marguerite de Gourbillon in Budweis in August 1796, while Louis Stanislas moved to Blankenburg.

During this period of exile, the count and countess fought constantly, though they did keep regular correspondence. Some historians have suggested Marie Joséphine's possible relationship with Marguerite de Gourbillon was the primary cause, while others have named Louis Stanislas' relationship with Anne de Balbi.

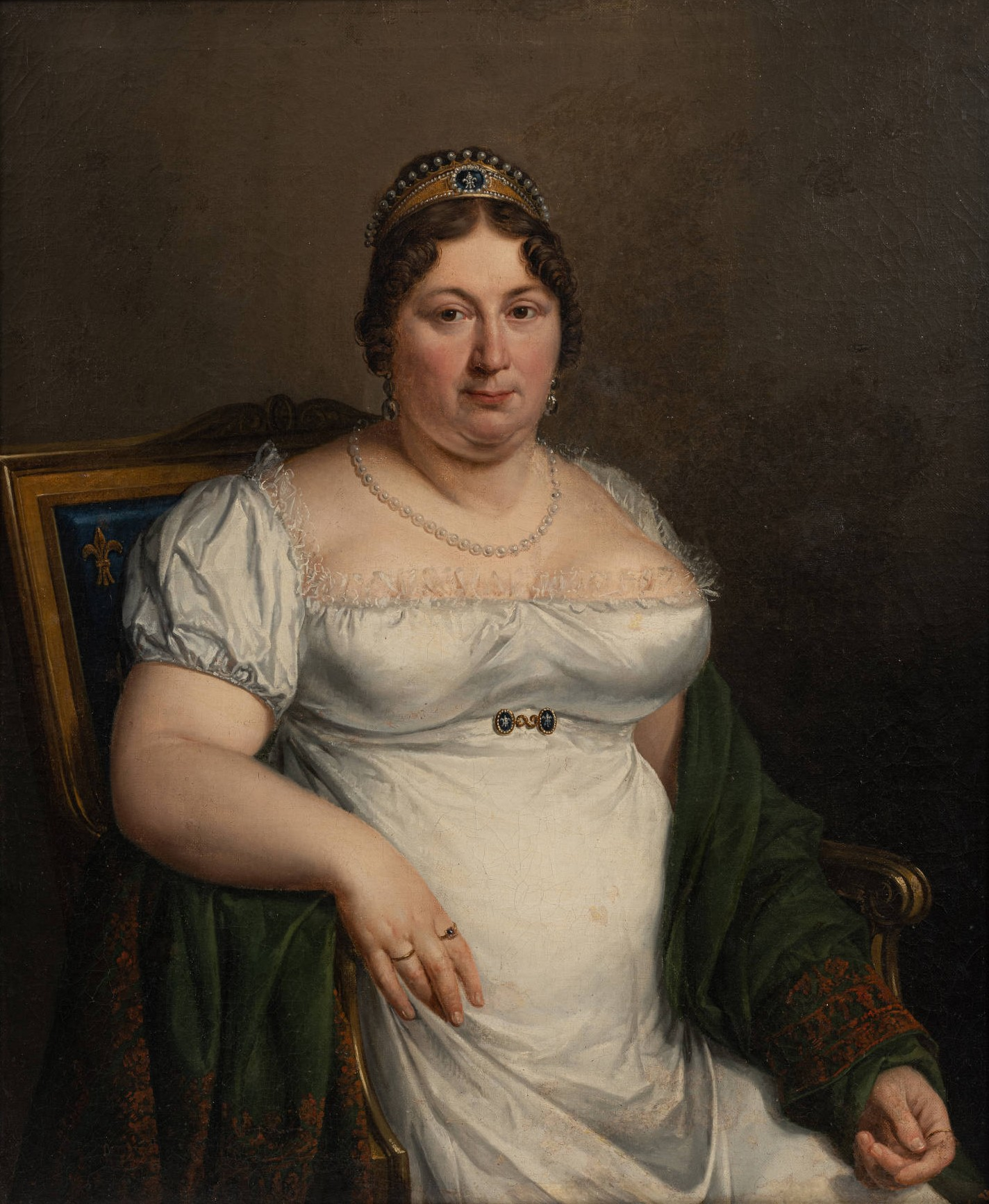
Marie Joséphine in later life (attributed to Marie-Éléonore Godefroid, early 1800s)

In 1799, Marie Joséphine was asked by Louis to join him in Mitau in Russian Courland to attend the wedding between her husband's niece Marie Thérèse, the only remaining child of Louis XVI and Marie Antoinette, to her nephew Louis-Antoine, Duke of Angoulême, at the French court-in-exile, which operated under the protection of Tsar Paul I of Russia. Louis demanded that she leave Gourbillon behind. Louis Stanislas accused Marguerite de Gourbillon of extorting jewels and money from Marie Joséphine and of wearing her clothes, and stated that the kind of relationship she had with Marie Joséphine made her company unsuitable for the new role as queen that Marie Joséphine was expected to play in Mitau. After having written to the Tsar to ask him to intervene on Gourbillon's behalf, and having received no reply, they travelled there together. When Marie Joséphine arrived with Gourbillon, travelling in two separate carriages, the carriage containing Gourbillon was separated from the rest and directed to the Governor's house, where she was arrested. When Marie Joséphine arrived and noticed the absence of Gourbillon, she reacted with a public protest in front of the whole court. She created a public scandal by a scene in which openly declared that she would refuse to change out of her clothes or install herself in her quarters before Gourbillon was given permission to join her. This tactic was unsuccessful, as her husband stated that he forbade her from leaving Mitau, and instead she thereafter refused to leave her rooms, where she isolated herself with a bottle of liquor. Gourbillon, in alliance with Michelle de Bonneuil, later managed to have her revenge by convincing the tsar to expel Louis from Russia in January 1801. Marie Joséphine did participate in the welcoming of Marie Thérèse and the following wedding, but the relationship between her and Louis did not improve and it was noticed that she refused to speak with him.

In 1800, Marie Joséphine left for the health resort of Bad Pyrmont in Germany where she remained for several years under the name comtesse de Lille, with the support of doctors, who deemed the cold climate in Russia as well as the journey there unsuitable for her health.

In 1804, Marie Joséphine was forced to return to Louis against her will, since his deteriorating finances could no longer afford two separate households. In 1808, Marie Joséphine left Mitau in the company of Marie Thérèse to join her spouse in England, where they were allowed to set up a French exile court in Hartwell House, the English residence of the exiled French royal family. She was ill with edema upon her arrival in England and lived very discreetly until her death two years later.

=== Death ===
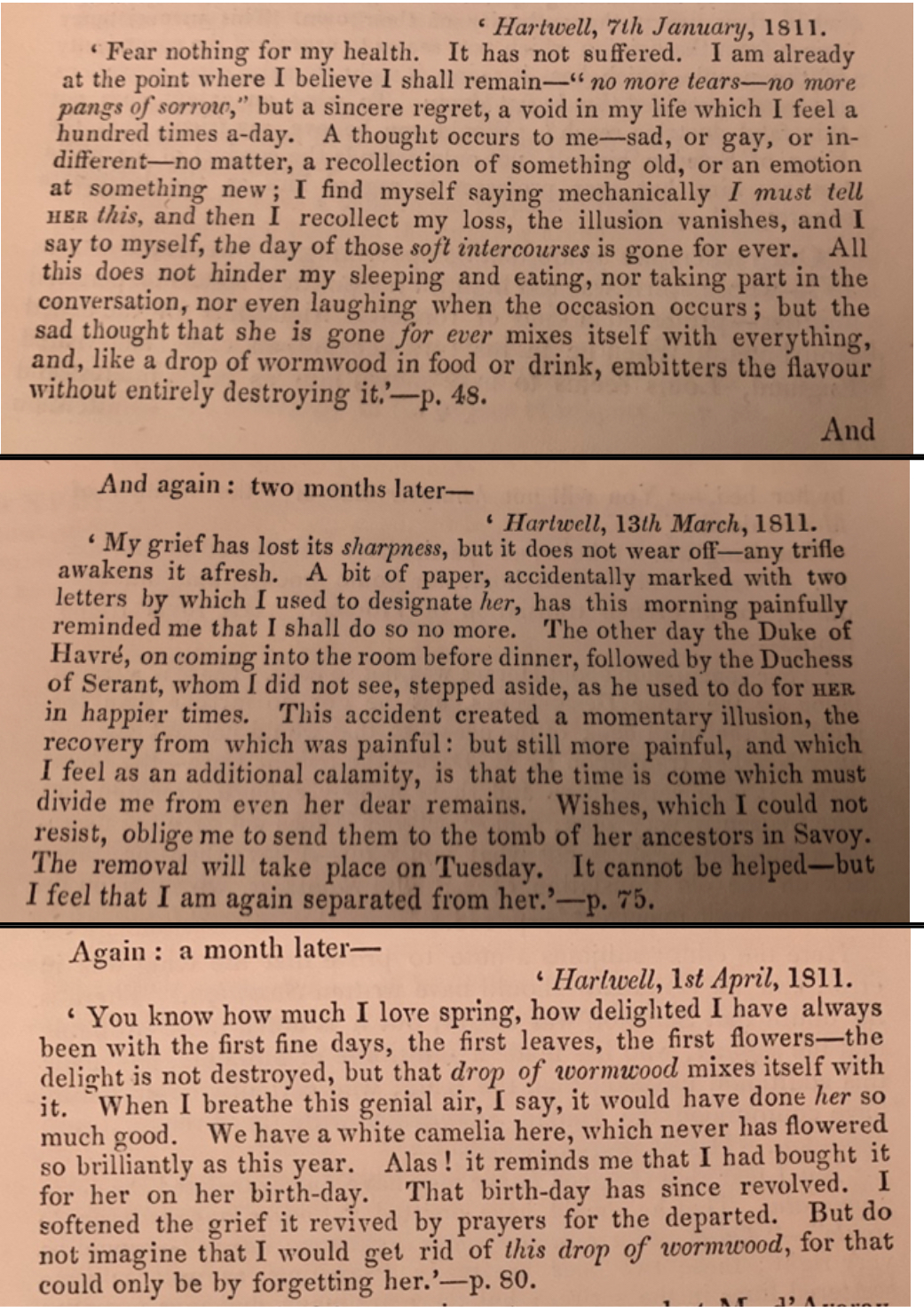
Private letters of Louis Stanislas regarding the death of Marie Joséphine

Marie Joséphine died on 13 November 1810 of that edema. Surrounded in her final days by most of the French court, she begged for forgiveness for any wrongs she might have done them, especially Louis; she assured him that she harboured no ill will toward him. Her funeral was a magnificent occasion attended by all the members of the court-in-exile, whose names were recorded by police spies and reported back to Napoleon. The funeral cortege was followed by the carriage of the British royal family, and Marie Joséphine was laid to rest in the Lady Chapel of Westminster Abbey.

After her death, Louis Stanislas in several letters, talks of the fact he loves and misses his recently departed wife. He wrote this in his private letters to his close companion Duke d’Avray, so the letters were not meant for public effect, but are regarded by some historians as true to his feelings.

Her body was removed a year later on Louis's orders and buried in the Kingdom of Sardinia; today it lies in Cagliari Cathedral. There, her brother King Charles Felix of Sardinia had an imposing monument erected over her grave, whereon she is described personally as "sapiens, prudens, pientissima" ("wise, prudent, kindest") and as "Galliarum Regina", literally "Queen of the Gauls", i.e. of France.

== Ancestry ==
Ancestors of Marie Joséphine of Savoy

8. Victor Amadeus II of Sardinia
4. Charles Emmanuel III of Sardinia
9. Anne Marie of Orléans
2. Victor Amadeus III of Sardinia
10. Ernest Leopold, Landgrave of Hesse-Rotenburg
5. Polyxena of Hesse-Rotenburg
11. Eleonore of Löwenstein-Wertheim-Rochefort
1. Marie Joséphine of Savoy
12. Louis, Dauphin of France
6. Philip V of Spain
13. Maria Anna Victoria of Bavaria
3. Maria Antonia Ferdinanda of Spain
14. Odoardo Farnese, Hereditary Prince of Parma
7. Elisabeth Farnese
15. Dorothea Sophie of the Palatinate

== In fiction and film ==
The Countess of Provence was played by French actress Clémentine Poidatz in the 2006 motion picture Marie Antoinette directed by Sofia Coppola. The film portrays her as the mother of the Duke of Angoulême (Louis XIX), who was really the son of her sister Princess Maria Theresa of Savoy.

In the 2022 TV series Marie Antoinette, she is portrayed by Roxane Duran.

== Notes ==
Marie Joséphine of Savoy House of Savoy Born: 2 September 1753 Died: 13 November 1810
Titles in pretence
Vacant Title last held by Marie Antoinette of Austria	— TITULAR — Queen consort of France; 8 June 1795 – 13 November 1810; Reason for succession failure: French Revolution (1789–1799)	Vacant Title next held by Marie Thérèse of France
