= Anne de Balbi =

French aristocrat

Anne Jacobée Nompar
- Countess de Balbi
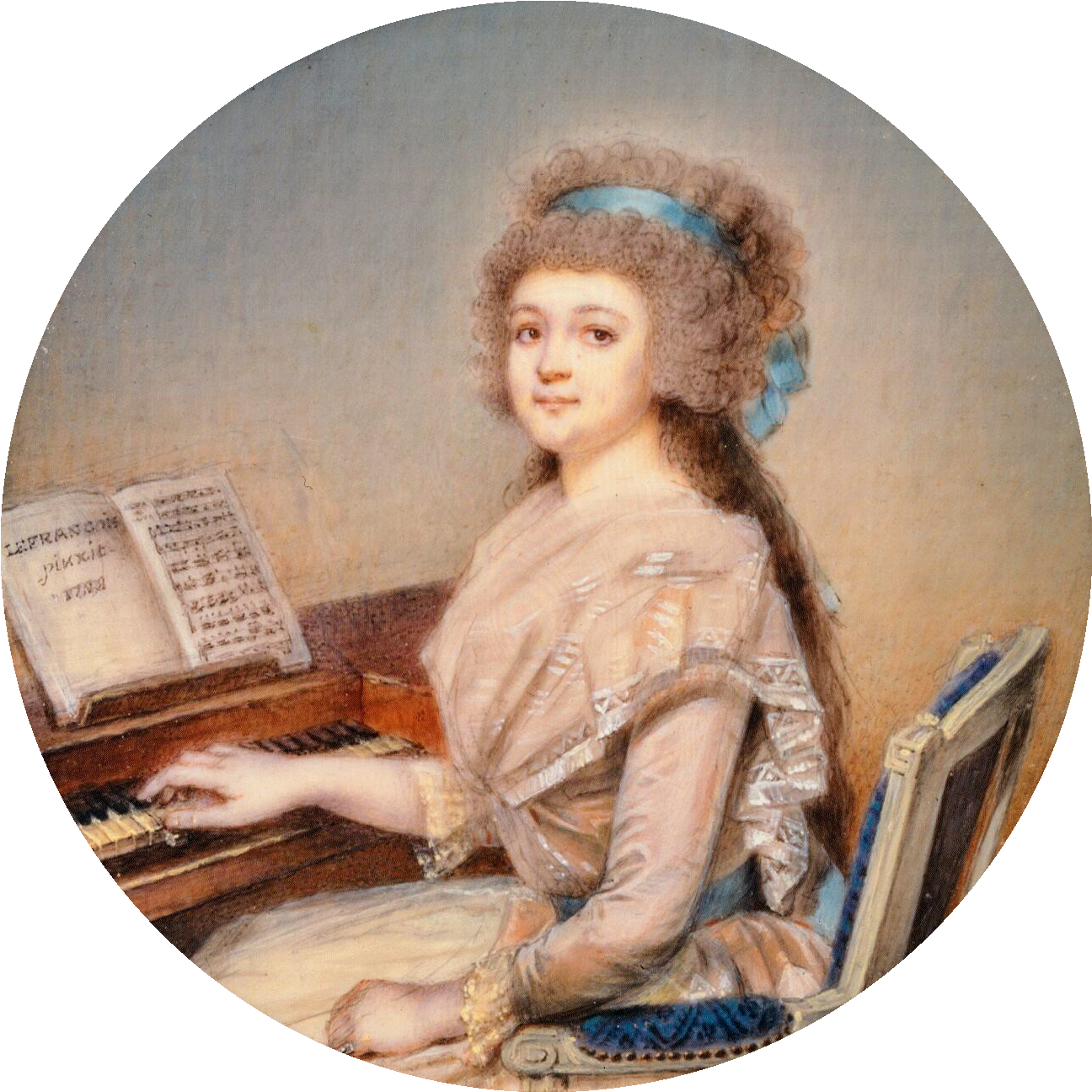
- Miniature by Nicolas Le François, 1788
- Full name: Anne Jacobée Nompar de Caumont
- Born: 19 August 1753; Chateau La Force, France
- Died: 3 April 1842 (aged 88); Paris, France
- Noble family: Caumont
- Occupation: Lady-in-waiting; Royal mistress

Anne, Countess de Balbi (19 August 1753 – 3 April 1842) was a French aristocrat and lady-in-waiting. She is foremost known as a mistress of the Count of Provence from 1780 to 1791, who later became Louis XVIII.

== Life ==
=== Family ===
Anne was born in the Chateau La Force, as the daughter of the Duke Bertrand Nompar de Caumont de la Force (1724–1773), an official at the court of King Louis XV and First Gentleman of the Bedchamber for the Count of Provence, and his wife Adelaide-Luce-Madeleine de Galard de Brassac de Béarn (1739-1829), governess of the children of the Count of Artois. She was married to Count Francesco Marie Armand de Balbi (1752-1835), with whom she had four daughters.

=== Mistress of the Count of Provence ===
Anne was described as a witty and humorous beauty, but also attracted enemies with her relentlessness. In 1779, she became the lady-in-waiting (dame d’atours) of the Countess of Provence, allegedly because she wanted to become the count's lover. It is alleged that the count made Anne his mistress because of his anger over his wife's love for Marguerite de Gourbillon. Anne's husband, who protested against their relationship, was declared insane and imprisoned in a mental asylum by the count. Provence created a garden at Versailles in 1785, named Balbi after her.

=== Separation and final years ===
Anne de Balbi was together with the other favorite of the count of Provence, Duke d'Avaray. Anne participated in the planning of the Flight to Varennes, and left for the Austrian Netherlands on 2 June, where she welcomed Provence after his successful escape on 21 June.

Anne de Balbi played a leading role in the French emigree court of Koblenz as one of the women termed as the 'Queens of the Emigration' alongside the Princess of Monaco and Louise de Polastron, and was courted for her influence over Louis Stanislaus, who was proclaimed French regent in exile. She gave regular receptions in the house she was provided near the residence of Louis, and because it was well known that he confided in her and that she acted as his political advisor, she was courted by foreign diplomats, and reportedly had particularly closed connections with the Russian envoy.

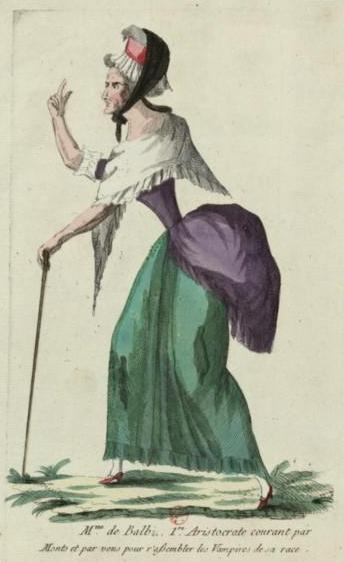
Caricature of Anne Jacobée, from 1791

The Comte de Neuilly described her in this period:

"Every evening, after the Comtesse de Balbi had performed her duties to Madame, she returned home, and her guests began to assemble. But first she changed her dress; her hair was arranged in front of a little table which was brought from another room; her dress and even her chemise was put on in our presence; it was the received thing, and it seemed to us so natural that we never even thought about it. I must say that, in spite of pretty quick eyes, I never saw more than if she had had ten screens round her. We were there, Pir6, Balbi, and I, young fellows of no importance, although we wore uniform, and were already men; but Monsieur was also present, and he paid no more attention than we did. Generally, he remained with his back turned, seated in an armchair in front of the fireplace, his hand resting on his crooked stick, the shadow of which thrown in silhouette, made the profile of Louis XVI. He had a habit of pushing the end of his stick into his shoe. During Madame de Balbi's toilette, which hardly lasted ten minutes, the conversation pursued its course. It continued in the same gay familiar tone, after the arrival of M. d'Avaray, of the Comte de Verac, and of the very small number of guests who were admitted to these evenings. We talked of theatres, music, news from Paris, songs, nonsense, gossip. Monsieur told anecdotes to perfection, and knew how to gloss over what might sometimes be broad in them. Games were played, rhymes were made, sometimes there was reading aloud . . . occasionally we had to make verses, and his Royal Highness condescended to give us lessons in prosody."

Reportedly, she had a fierce temperament and resented rivals over her influence with the count of Provence, and her rivalry with his other favorite, Duke d'Avaray, was well-known and caused scenes on some occasions.

In April 1792, she was forced to follow the countess of Provence to Savoy, since she was officially her lady-in-waiting. She eventually left Savoy and settled in Brussels, where she kept in contact with the count of Provence. During the separation, she gave birth to twins, which was reported to the count of Provence by his other favorite, d'Avaray, when she stated her plans to join the Provence party in Verona. Because of the time chronology, they could not have been the children of the count of Provence, which made him end the relationship. The father of the twins was reportedly a Comte Archambaud de Talleyrand-Périgord.

She lived in England until 1802, when her name was removed from the list of émigrées. She returned to France, where she laid claims on the fortune of her spouse, and lived with her brother in the countryside until her death.

She died in Paris in 1842, three years before her husband.
