= Marguerite de Gourbillon =

French noble and lady-in-waiting (1737–1817)

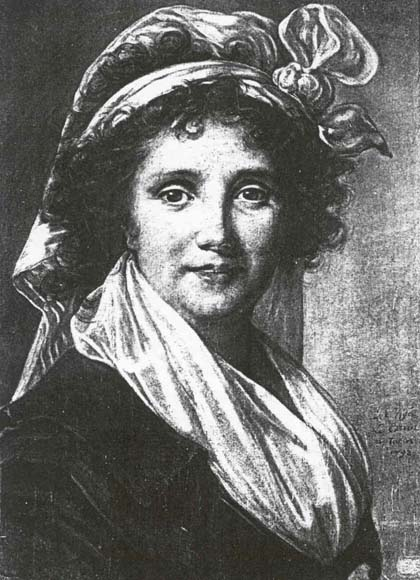
Marguerite de Gourbillon

Jeanne-Marguerite de Gourbillon, née Gallois (1737 in Gray, Haute-Saône – 1817), was a French noble and lady-in-waiting. She was the lady in waiting, lectrice, and favorite of the Countess of Provence, Marie Joséphine of Savoy, consort of the future king Louis XVIII.

== Life ==
She was born in a merchant family in Gray, Haute-Saône as Jeanne-Marguerite Gallois, and married to the noble Charles-Florent de Gourbillon, who was an post official at Lille, in 1763.

=== Court life ===
In 1785, she was appointed lectrice (reader) to the Princess Marie Joséphine, consort of Prince Louis, Count de Provence, brother of king Louis XVI. Marguerite de Gourbillon formed a very close and intimate relationship with Marie Joséphine, which may or may not have been physical. Already in 1780, there had been rumors in libels that Marie Josephine was lesbian, as her lady-in-waiting Anne de Balbi was said to play the same role for her that Madame de Polignac played for the queen (indicating a sexual relationship, as de Polignac was alleged to be the lover of the queen).

After the Count de Provence started his relationship with Anne de Balbi, Marie Josephine isolated herself with her women courtiers, and Gourbillon came to have such an intimate relationship to her that it attracted attention. Gourbillon was reportedly so certain of Marie Josephine's affection that she became provocative and was said to dominate Marie Josephine and her household, and it was noted that they spent late nights together alone. Gourbillon was suspected of "corrupting" Marie Josephine, and to inducing her to drink or, at least, to provide her with alcohol.

Prince Louis disliked the influence she had over his wife. In February 1789, Provence successfully asked his brother, Louis XVI, to issue a lettre de cachet, which expelled Gourbillon to join her husband in Lille. This took place after an incident which convinced the king that Gourbillon had a corrupting influence upon Marie Josephine. One evening, the king and the Count de Provence met Gourbillon in a passageway carrying a pot which she was trying to hide, and which was discovered to contain alcohol.

Her banishment was only temporary, however, and in 1790, she was allowed to return to her position.

In June 1791, Gourbillon accompanied Marie Joséphine into exile to Germany during the French Revolution. During the period of exile, the Count and Countess fought constantly. Some historians have suggested Marie Joséphine's possible lesbian relationship with a lady-in-waiting as the primary cause for discord between the couple.

=== Exile ===
During the exile, Gourbillon lived with Marie Joséphine first in Savoy and then in Kiel in Germany.

In 1799, Marie Joséphine was asked by Louis to join him in Mitau in Russian Courland to attend the wedding between her husband's niece Marie-Thérèse Charlotte to her husband's nephew Louis Antoine d'Artois, duc d'Angoulême at the French exile court. The court was there under the protection of the Russian Tsar. However, Louis demanded that she leave Gourbillon behind. After having written to the Tsar to ask him to intervene on Gourbillon's behalf, and having received no reply, they traveled there together. When Marie Joséphine arrived with Gourbillon, their carriage was stopped before they reached the palace in Mitau, and Gourbillon was forcibly separated from Marie Joséphine. Upon her arrival, Marie Joséphine staged a public protest in front of the whole court, openly declaring that she refused to change out of her clothes or install herself in her quarters before Gourbillon was given permission to join her. This was unsuccessful, and she thereafter refused to leave her rooms, where she isolated herself with a bottle of whiskey. This scene caused a public scandal. Gourbillon later managed to have her revenge by convincing the Tsar to expel Prince Louis and his court from Russia in 1801.

When Louis and Marie Joséphine left for Great Britain in 1808, Gourbillon followed them there and settled in London, where she made repeated attempts to reunite with Marie Joséphine. Louis, however, refused to allow it and would not receive her.
