= Louis XVIII =

King of France from 1814 to 1824

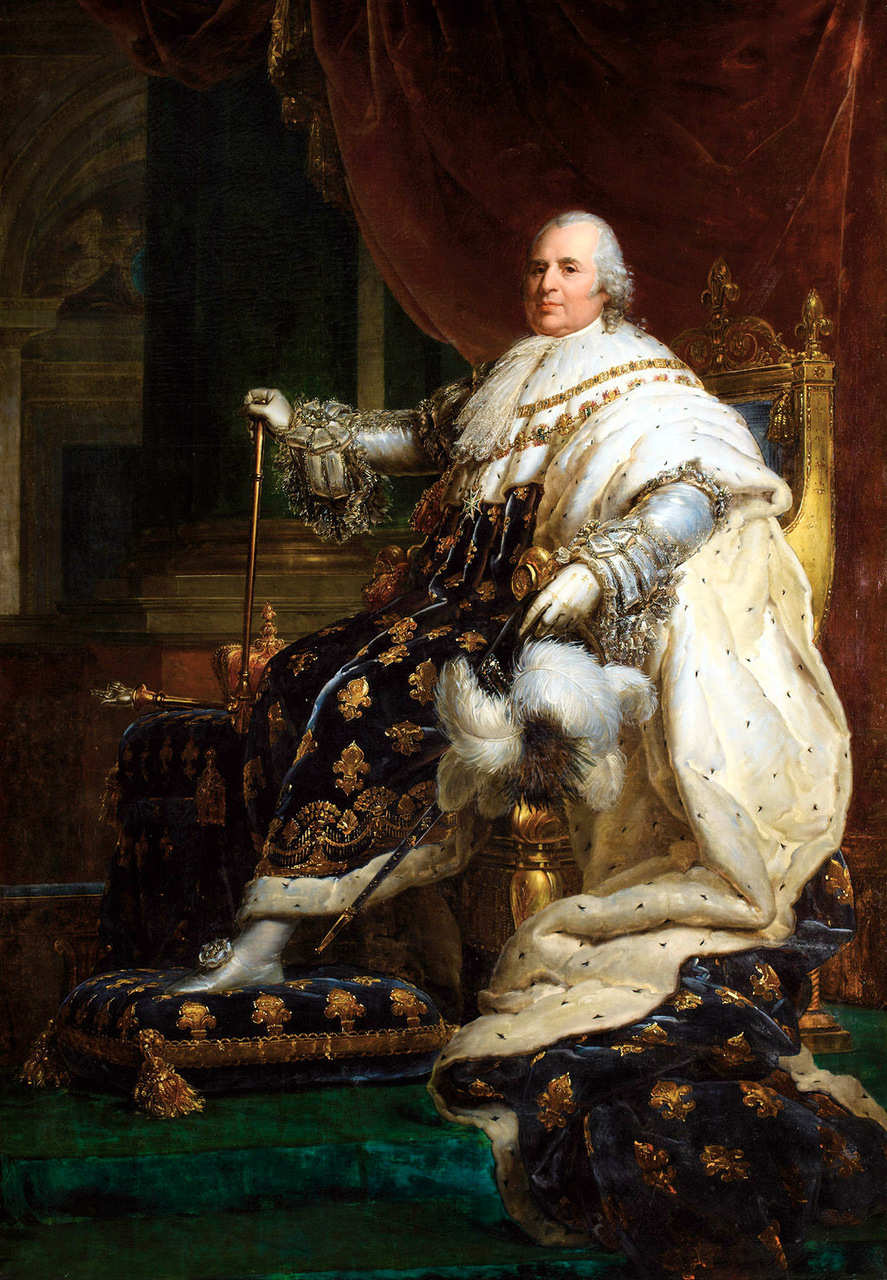
- Portrait of Louis XVIII by François Gérard, 1814

King of France
- 1st reign: 3 May 1814 – 20 March 1815 (Note: Claimant from 8 June 1795 to 3 May 1814, and from 20 March to 8 July 1815. In his official acts as king, Louis XVIII dated the years of his reign from 1795, when his nephew Louis XVII died.)
- 2nd reign: 8 July 1815 – 16 September 1824
- Predecessor: Napoleon I (as emperor)
- Successor: Charles X
- Prime ministers: See list: The Prince of Talleyrand (1814); The Duke of Blacas (1814–1815); The Prince of Talleyrand (1815); The Duke of Richelieu (1815–1818); Jean-Joseph Dessolles (1818–1819); The Duke of Decazes (1819–1820); The Duke of Richelieu (1820–1821); The Count of Villèle (1821–1824)
- Born: Louis Stanislas Xavier, Count of Provence; 17 November 1755; Palace of Versailles, France
- Died: 16 September 1824 (aged 68); Tuileries Palace, Paris, France
- Burial: 24 September 1824; Basilica of Saint Denis
- Spouse: Marie Joséphine of Savoy (m. 1771; died 1810)
- House: Bourbon
- Father: Louis, Dauphin of France
- Mother: Maria Josepha of Saxony
- Religion: Catholicism

Louis XVIII (Louis Stanislas Xavier; 17 November 1755 – 16 September 1824), known as the Desired (French: le Désiré), was King of France from 1814 to 1824, except for a brief interruption during the Hundred Days in 1815. Before his reign, he spent 23 years in exile from France beginning in 1791, during the French Revolution and the First French Empire.

Until his accession to the throne of France, he held the title of Count of Provence as brother of King Louis XVI, the last king of the Ancien Régime. On 21 September 1792, the National Convention abolished the monarchy and deposed Louis XVI, who was later executed by guillotine. When his young nephew Louis XVII died in prison in June 1795, the Count of Provence claimed the throne as Louis XVIII.

Following the French Revolution and during the Napoleonic era, Louis XVIII lived in exile in Prussia, Great Britain, and Russia. When the Sixth Coalition first defeated Napoleon in 1814, Louis XVIII was placed in what he, and the French royalists, considered his rightful position. However, Napoleon escaped from his exile in Elba and restored the Napoleonic Empire. Louis XVIII fled, and a Seventh Coalition declared war on the French Empire, defeated Napoleon again, and again restored Louis XVIII to the French throne.

Louis XVIII ruled as king for slightly more than a decade with his combined reigns. His Bourbon Restoration government was a constitutional monarchy, unlike the absolutist Ancien Régime in France before the Revolution. As a constitutional monarch, Louis XVIII's royal prerogative was reduced substantially by the Charter of 1814, France's new constitution. His return in 1815 led to a second wave of White Terror headed by the Ultra-royalist faction. The following year, Louis dissolved the unpopular parliament (the Chambre introuvable), giving rise to the liberal Doctrinaires. His reign was further marked by the formation of the Quintuple Alliance and a military intervention in Spain. Louis had no children, and upon his death the crown passed to his brother, Charles X. Louis XVIII was the last king or emperor of France to die a reigning monarch: his successor, Charles X (r. 1824–1830), abdicated; and both Louis Philippe I (r. 1830–1848) and Napoleon III (r. 1852–1870) were deposed.

== Youth ==
Louis Stanislas Xavier, styled Count of Provence from birth, was born on 17 November 1755 in the Palace of Versailles, a younger son of Louis Ferdinand, Dauphin of France, and his wife Maria Josepha of Saxony. He was the grandson of the reigning King Louis XV. As a son of the Dauphin, he was a Fils de France. He was christened Louis Stanislas Xavier six months after his birth, in accordance with Bourbon family tradition, being nameless before his baptism. By this act, he also became a Knight of the Order of the Holy Spirit. The name of Louis was bestowed because it was typical of a prince of France; Stanislas was chosen to honour his great-grandfather King Stanislaus I of Poland who was still alive at the time; and Xavier was chosen for Saint Francis Xavier, whom his mother's family held as one of their patron saints.

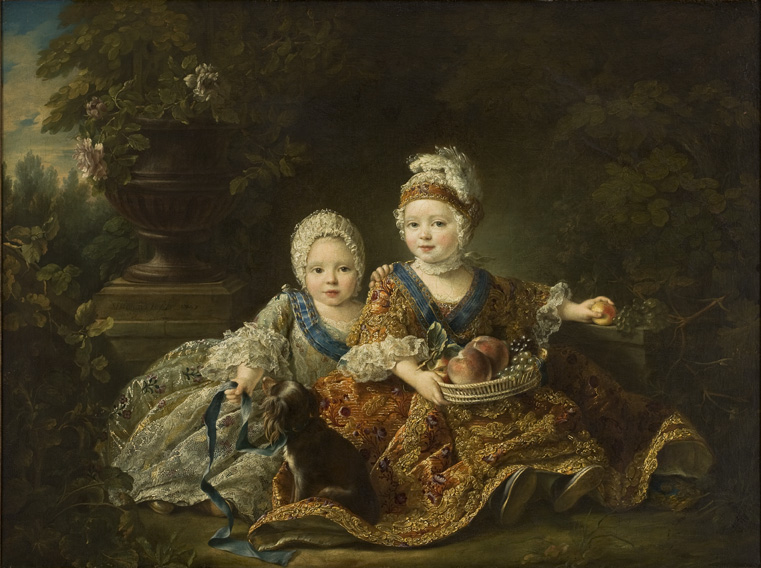
The Count of Provence and his brother Louis Auguste, Duke of Berry (later Louis XVI), depicted in 1757 by François-Hubert Drouais

At the time of his birth, Louis Stanislas was fourth in line to the throne of France, behind his father and his two elder brothers: the Duke of Burgundy, and the Duke of Berry. The former died in 1761, leaving Louis Auguste as heir to their father until the Dauphin's own premature death in 1765. The two deaths elevated Louis Stanislas to second in the line of succession, while his brother Louis Auguste acquired the title of Dauphin.

Louis Stanislas found comfort in his governess, Madame de Marsan, Governess of the Children of France, as he was her favourite among his siblings. Louis Stanislas was taken away from his governess when he turned seven, the age at which the education of boys of royal blood and of the nobility was turned over to men. Antoine de Quélen de Stuer de Caussade, Duke of La Vauguyon, a friend of his father, was named as his governor.

Louis Stanislas was an intelligent boy, excelling in the classics. His education was of the same quality and consistency as that of his older brother, Louis Auguste, despite the fact that Louis Auguste was heir and Louis Stanislas was not. Louis Stanislas's education was quite religious in nature; several of his teachers were priests, such as Jean-Gilles du Coëtlosquet, Bishop of Limoges; the Abbé Jean-Antoine Nollet; and the Jesuit Guillaume-François Berthier. La Vauguyon drilled into young Louis Stanislas and his brothers the way he thought princes should "know how to withdraw themselves, to like to work," and "to know how to reason correctly".

In April 1771, when he was 15, Louis Stanislas's education was formally concluded, and his own independent household was established, which astounded contemporaries with its extravagance: in 1773, the number of his servants reached 390 In the same month his household was founded, Louis was granted several titles by his grandfather, Louis XV: Duke of Anjou, Count of Maine, Count of Perche, and Count of Senoches. During this period of his life he was often known by the title Count of Provence.

On 17 December 1773, he was inaugurated as a Grand Master of the Order of St. Lazarus.

== Marriage ==
Marie Joséphine in 1772 (by François-Hubert Drouais)

On 16 April 1771, Louis Stanislas was married by proxy to Princess Maria Giuseppina of Savoy. The in-person ceremony was conducted on 14 May at the Palace of Versailles. Marie Joséphine (as she was known in France) was the daughter of Victor Amadeus, Duke of Savoy (later King Victor Amadeus III of Sardinia), and Maria Antonia Ferdinanda of Spain.

A luxurious ball followed the wedding on 20 May. Louis Stanislas found his wife repulsive; she was considered ugly, tedious, and ignorant of the customs of the court of Versailles. The marriage remained unconsummated for years. Biographers disagree about the reason. The most common theories propose Louis Stanislas' alleged impotence (according to biographer Antonia Fraser) or his unwillingness to sleep with his wife due to her poor personal hygiene. She never brushed her teeth, plucked her eyebrows, or used any perfumes. At the time of his marriage, Louis Stanislas was obese and waddled instead of walked. He never exercised and continued to eat enormous amounts of food.

Despite the fact that Louis Stanislas was not infatuated with his wife, he boasted that the couple enjoyed vigorous conjugal relations – but such declarations were held in low esteem by courtiers at Versailles. He also proclaimed his wife to be pregnant merely to spite Louis Auguste and his wife Marie Antoinette, who had not yet consummated their marriage. The Dauphin and Louis Stanislas did not enjoy a harmonious relationship and often quarrelled, as did their wives. Louis Stanislas did impregnate his wife in 1774, having conquered his aversion. However, the pregnancy ended in a miscarriage. A second pregnancy in 1781 also miscarried and the marriage remained childless.

== At his brother's court ==
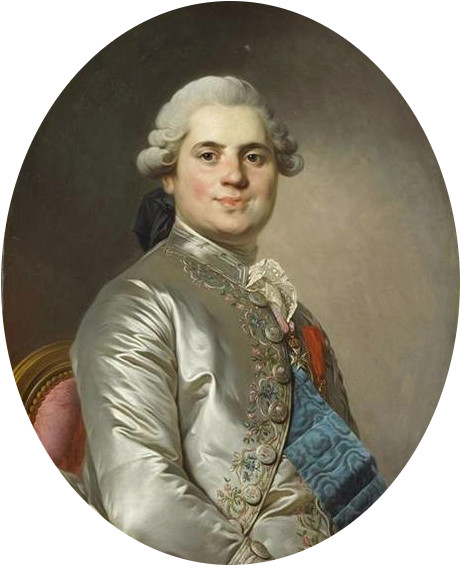
Louis Stanislas, Count of Provence, during the reign of Louis XVI

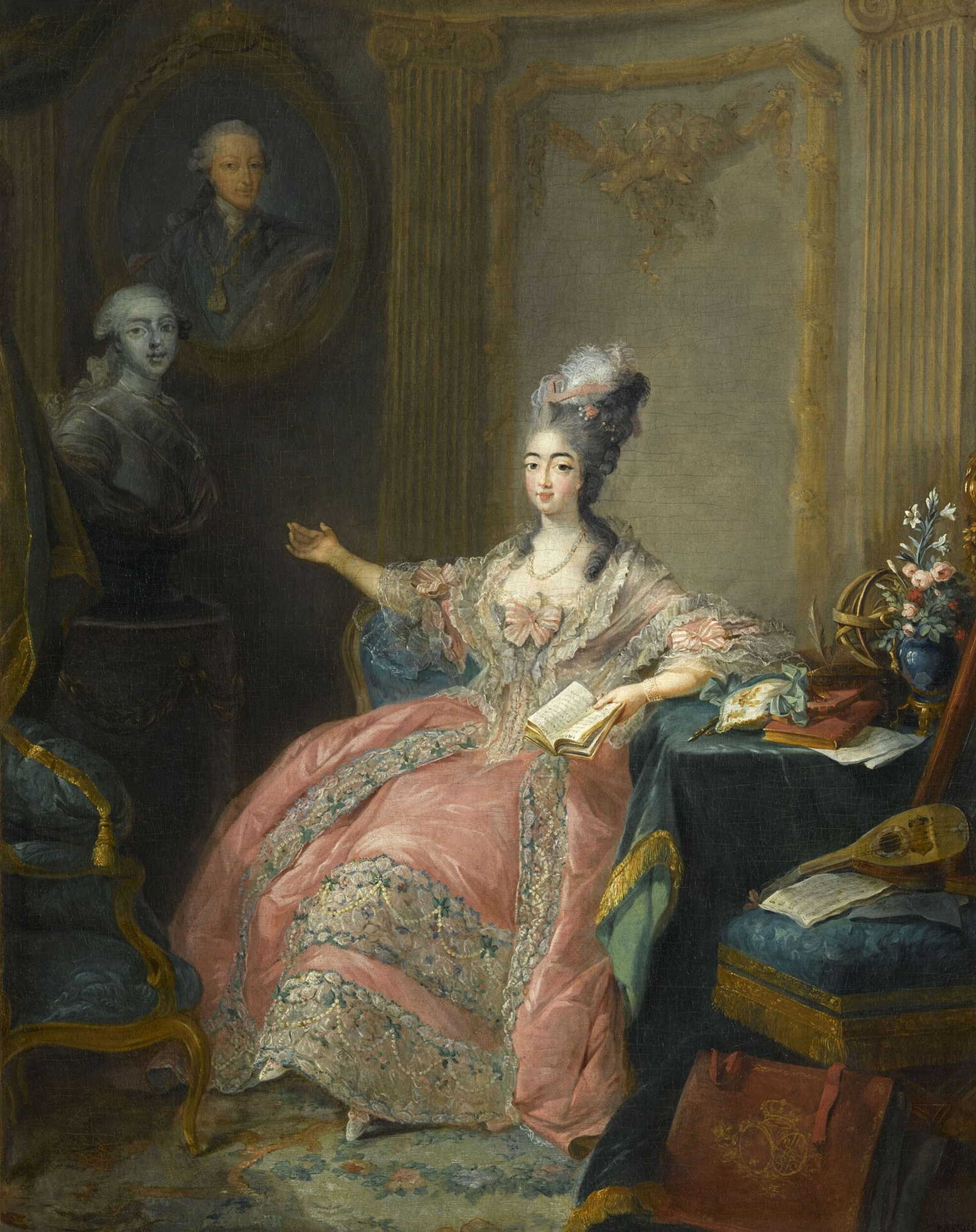
Marie Joséphine, Countess of Provence, Louis Stanislas' wife, by Jean-Baptiste André Gautier-Dagoty, 1775

On 27 April 1774, Louis XV fell ill after contracting smallpox and died a few days later on 10 May, aged 64. Louis Stanislas' elder brother, the Dauphin Louis Auguste, succeeded their grandfather as King Louis XVI. As eldest brother of the King, Louis Stanislas received the title Monsieur. Louis Stanislas longed for political influence. He attempted to gain admittance to the King's council in 1774, but failed. Louis Stanislas was left in a political limbo that he called "a gap of 12 years in my political life". Louis XVI granted Louis Stanislas revenues from the Duchy of Alençon in December 1774. The duchy was given to enhance Louis Stanislas's prestige. However, the appanage generated only 300,000 livres a year, an amount much lower than it had been at its peak in the fourteenth century.

Louis Stanislas travelled about France more than other members of the Royal Family, who rarely left the Île-de-France. In 1774, he accompanied his sister Clotilde to Chambéry on the journey to meet her bridegroom Charles Emmanuel, Prince of Piedmont, heir to the throne of Sardinia. In 1775, he visited Lyon and also his spinster aunts Adélaïde and Victoire while they were taking the waters at Vichy. The four provincial tours that Louis Stanislas took before the year 1791 amounted to a total of three months.

On 5 May 1778, Dr. Lassonne, Marie Antoinette's private physician, confirmed her pregnancy. On 19 December 1778, the Queen gave birth to a daughter, who was named Marie-Thérèse Charlotte de France and given the honorific title Madame Royale. That the baby was a girl came as a relief to the Count of Provence, who kept his position as heir to Louis XVI, since Salic Law excluded women from acceding to the throne of France. However, Louis Stanislas did not remain heir to the throne much longer. On 22 October 1781, Marie Antoinette gave birth to the Dauphin Louis Joseph. Louis Stanislas and his brother, the Count of Artois, served as godfathers by proxy for Joseph II, Holy Roman Emperor, the Queen's brother. When Marie Antoinette gave birth to her second son, Louis Charles, in March 1785, Louis Stanislas slid further down the line of succession.

In 1780, Anne Nompar de Caumont, Countess of Balbi, entered the service of Marie Joséphine. Louis Stanislas soon fell in love with his wife's new lady-in-waiting and installed her as his mistress, which resulted in the couple's already limited affection for each other cooling entirely. Louis Stanislas commissioned a pavilion for his mistress on a parcel of land at Versailles which became known as the Parc Balbi.

Louis Stanislas lived a quiet and sedentary lifestyle at this point, not having a great deal to do since his self-proclaimed political exclusion in 1774. He kept himself occupied with his vast library of over 11,000 books at Balbi's pavilion, reading for several hours each morning. In the early 1780s, he also incurred huge debts totalling 10 million livres, which his brother Louis XVI paid.

An Assembly of Notables (the members consisted of magistrates, mayors, nobles and clergy) was convened in February 1787 to ratify the financial reforms sought by the Controller-General of Finance Charles Alexandre de Calonne. This provided the Count of Provence, who abhorred the radical reforms proposed by Calonne, his long-awaiting opportunity to establish himself in politics. The reforms proposed a new property tax, and new elected provincial assemblies which would have a say in local taxation. Calonne's proposition was rejected outright by the notables, and, as a result, Louis XVI dismissed him. The Archbishop of Toulouse, Étienne Charles de Loménie de Brienne, acquired Calonne's ministry. Brienne attempted to salvage Calonne's reforms, but ultimately failed to convince the notables to approve them. A frustrated Louis XVI dissolved the assembly.

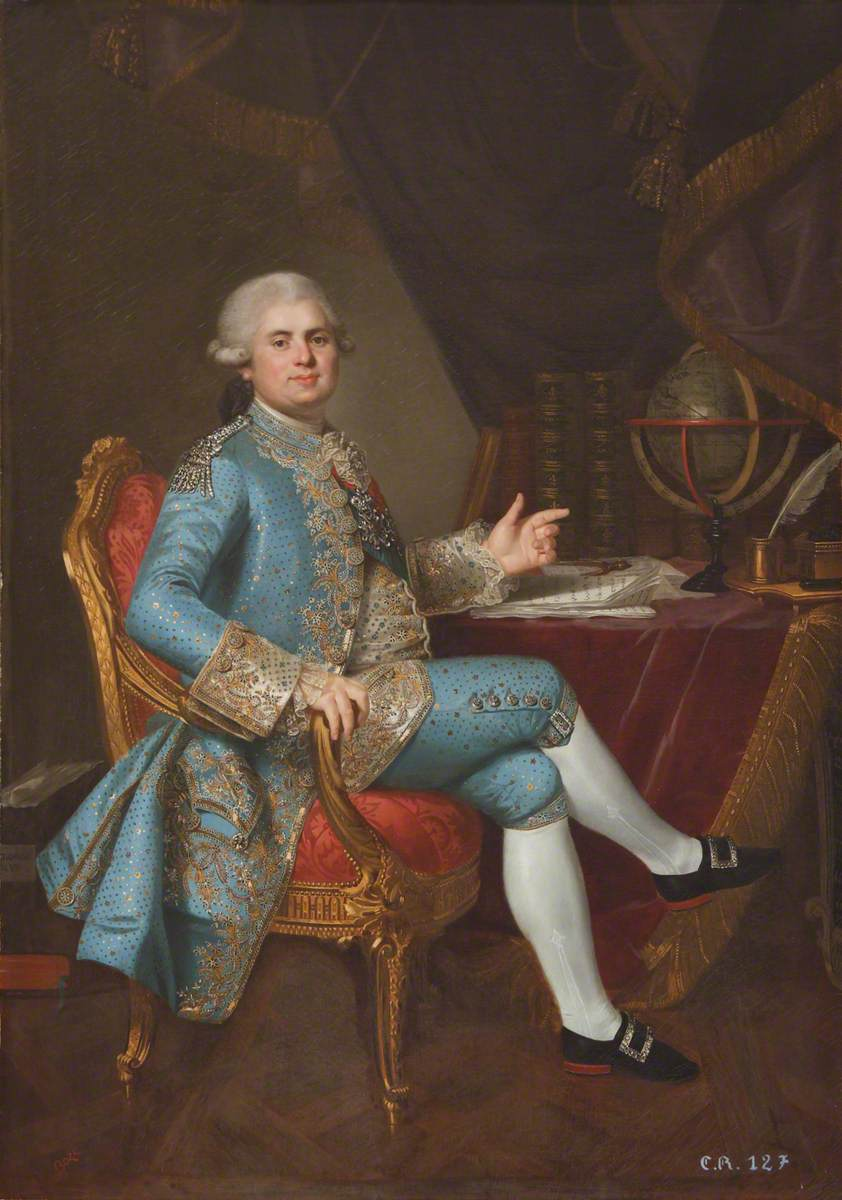
Louis-Stanislas-Xavier, comte de Provence by Joseph Boze

Brienne's reforms were then submitted to the Parlement of Paris in the hopes that they would be approved. (A parlement was responsible for ratifying the King's edicts; each province had its own parlement, but the Parlement of Paris was the most significant of all.) The Parlement of Paris refused to accept Brienne's proposals and declared that any new taxation would have to be approved by an Estates-General (the nominal parliament of France). Louis XVI and Brienne took a hostile stance against this rejection, and Louis XVI had to implement a "bed of justice" (Lit de justice), which automatically registered an edict in the Parlement of Paris, to ratify the desired reforms. On 8 May, two of the leading members of the Parlement of Paris were arrested. There was rioting in Brittany, Provence, Burgundy and Béarn in reaction to their arrest. This unrest was engineered by local magistrates and nobles, who enticed the people to revolt against the Lit de Justice, which was quite unfavourable to the nobles and magistrates. The clergy also joined the provincial cause, and condemned Brienne's tax reforms. Brienne conceded defeat in July and agreed to a convocation of the Estates-General to meet in 1789. He resigned from his post in August and was replaced by the Swiss magnate Jacques Necker.

In November 1788, a second Assembly of Notables was convened by Jacques Necker, to consider the makeup of the next Estates-General. The Parlement of Paris recommended that the Estates should be the same as they were at the last assembly, in 1614 (this would mean that the clergy and nobility would have more representation than the Third Estate). The notables rejected the "dual representation" proposal. Louis Stanislas was the only notable to vote to increase the size of the Third Estate. Necker disregarded the notables' judgment, and convinced Louis XVI to grant the extra representation. The king duly obliged on 27 December.

=== Outbreak of the French Revolution ===
The Estates-General were convened in May 1789 to ratify financial reforms. The Count of Provence favoured a stalwart position against the Third Estate and its demands for tax reform. On 17 June, the Third Estate declared itself a National Assembly, an Assembly not of the Estates, but of the people.

The Count of Provence urged the King to act strongly against the declaration, while the King's popular minister Jacques Necker aimed at reaching a compromise with the new assembly. Louis XVI was characteristically indecisive. On 9 July, the assembly declared itself a National Constituent Assembly that would give France a Constitution. On 11 July, Louis XVI dismissed Necker, which led to widespread rioting across Paris. On 12 July, the sabre charge of the Régiment Royal–Allemand Cavalerie (Royal German Cavalry Regiment) of Charles-Eugène de Lorraine, Prince de Lambesc, against a crowd gathered at the Tuileries gardens, sparked the Storming of the Bastille two days later.

On 16 July, the King's brother, Charles, Comte d'Artois, left France with his wife and children, along with many other courtiers. Artois and his family took up residence in Turin, the capital city of his father-in-law's (Carlo Emanuele IV) Kingdom of Sardinia, with the family of Louis Joseph, Prince de Condé.

The Count of Provence decided to remain at Versailles. When the Royal Family plotted to abscond from Versailles to Metz, Provence advised the King not to leave, a suggestion he accepted.

The Royal Family was forced to leave the palace at Versailles on the day after the Women's March on Versailles, 5 October 1789. They were taken to Paris. There, the Count of Provence and his wife lodged in the Luxembourg Palace, while the rest of the Royal Family stayed in the Tuileries Palace. In March 1791, the National Assembly created a law outlining the regency of Louis Charles in case his father died while he was still too young to reign. This law awarded the regency to Louis Charles' nearest male relative in France (at that time the Count of Provence), and after him, the Duke of Orleans, thus bypassing the Count of Artois. If Orleans were unavailable, the regency would be submitted to election.

The Count of Provence and his wife fled to the Austrian Netherlands in conjunction with the royal family's failed Flight to Varennes in June 1791.

== Exile ==
=== Early years ===
When the Count of Provence arrived in the Low Countries, he proclaimed himself regent of France. He exploited a document that he and Louis XVI had written before the latter's failed escape to Varennes-en-Argonne. The document gave him the regency in the event of his brother's death or inability to perform his role as king. He would join the other princes-in-exile at Coblenz soon after his escape. It was there that he, the Count of Artois, and the Condé princes proclaimed that their objective was to invade France. Louis XVI was greatly annoyed by his brothers' behaviour. Provence sent emissaries to various European courts asking for financial aid, soldiers, and munition. Artois secured a castle for the court in exile in the Electorate of Trier (or "Treves"), where their maternal uncle, Clemens Wenceslaus of Saxony, was the Archbishop-Elector. The activities of the émigrés bore fruit when the rulers of Prussia and the Holy Roman Empire gathered at Dresden. They released the Declaration of Pillnitz in August 1791, which urged Europe to intervene in France if Louis XVI or his family were threatened. Provence's endorsement of the declaration was not well received in France, either by the ordinary citizens or by Louis XVI himself.

In January 1792, the Legislative Assembly declared that all of the émigrés were traitors to France. Their property and titles were confiscated. The monarchy of France was abolished by the National Convention on 21 September 1792.

Louis XVI was executed in January 1793. This left his young son, Louis Charles, as the titular King. The princes-in-exile proclaimed Louis Charles "King Louis XVII". The Count of Provence now unilaterally declared himself regent for his nephew, who was too young to be head of the House of Bourbon.

Louis XVII, still a minor, died in prison in June 1795. His only surviving sibling was his sister Marie-Thérèse, who was not considered a candidate for the throne because of France's traditional adherence to Salic law. Thus on 16 June, the princes-in-exile declared the Count of Provence "King Louis XVIII". The new king accepted their declaration soon after and busied himself drafting a manifesto in response to Louis XVII's death. The manifesto, known as the "Declaration of Verona", was Louis XVIII's attempt to introduce the French people to his politics. The Declaration of Verona beckoned France back into the arms of the monarchy, "which for fourteen centuries was the glory of France".

Louis XVIII negotiated the release of Marie-Thérèse from her Paris prison in 1795. He desperately wanted her to marry her first cousin, Louis Antoine, Duke of Angoulême, the son of the Count of Artois. Louis XVIII deceived his niece by telling her that her parents' last wishes were for her to marry Louis-Antoine, and she duly agreed to Louis XVIII's wishes.

Louis XVIII was forced to abandon Verona when Napoleon Bonaparte invaded the Republic of Venice in 1796.

=== 1796–1807 ===
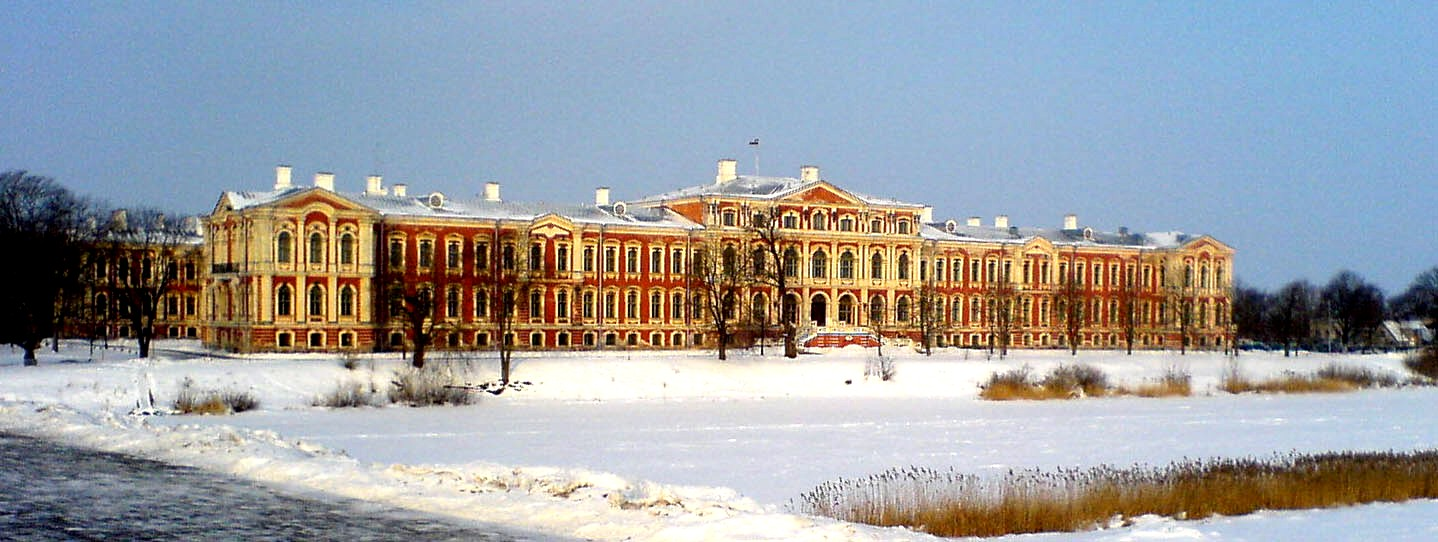
Jelgava Palace, Louis XVIII's residence in 1798–1801; 1804–1807

Louis XVIII had been vying for the custody of his niece Marie-Thérèse since her release from the Temple Tower in December 1795. He succeeded when Francis II, Holy Roman Emperor, agreed to relinquish his custody of her in 1796. She had been staying in Vienna with her Habsburg relatives since January 1796. Louis XVIII moved to Blankenburg in the Duchy of Brunswick after his departure from Verona. He lived in a modest two-bedroom apartment over a shop. Louis XVIII was forced to leave Blankenburg when King Frederick William II of Prussia died. In light of this, Marie-Thérèse decided to wait a while longer before reuniting with her uncle.

In 1798, Tsar Paul I of Russia offered Louis the use of Jelgava Palace in Courland (now Latvia). The Tsar also guaranteed Louis' safety and bestowed on him a generous pension, though later discontinued payment. Marie-Thérèse finally joined Louis XVIII at Jelgava in 1799. In the winter of 1798–1799, Louis XVIII wrote a biography of Marie Antoinette titled Réflexions historiques sur Marie Antoinette. Moreover, being surrounded at Jelgava with many old courtiers, he attempted to recreate the court life of Versailles, re-establishing various of the former court ceremonies, including the lever and coucher (ceremonies that accompanied waking and bedding, respectively).

On 9 June 1799, Marie-Thérèse married her cousin Louis-Antoine at the Jelgava Palace. Desperate to display to the world a united family, Louis XVIII ordered his wife Queen Marie Joséphine, who at the time was living apart from her husband in Schleswig-Holstein, to attend the wedding. Furthermore, she was to come without her long-time friend (and rumoured lover) Marguerite de Gourbillon. The Queen refused to leave her friend behind, creating an unpleasant situation that rivalled the wedding in notoriety. Louis XVIII knew that his nephew Louis-Antoine was not compatible with Marie-Thérèse. Despite this, he still pressed for the marriage, which proved to be quite unhappy and produced no children.

In 1800, Louis XVIII attempted to strike up a correspondence with Napoleon Bonaparte (by then First Consul of France), urging him to restore the Bourbons to their throne, but the future emperor was impervious to this idea and continued to consolidate his own position as ruler of France.

Louis XVIII encouraged his niece to write her memoirs, as he wished them to be used as Bourbon propaganda. In 1796 and 1803, Louis also used the diaries of Louis XVI's final attendants in the same way. In January 1801, Tsar Paul told Louis XVIII that he could no longer live in Russia. The court at Jelgava was so low on funds that it had to auction some of its possessions to afford the journey out of Russia. Marie-Thérèse even sold a diamond necklace that the Emperor Paul had given her as a wedding gift.

Marie-Thérèse persuaded Queen Louise of Prussia to give her family refuge on Prussian territory. Though Louise consented, the Bourbons were forced to assume pseudonyms. With Louis XVIII using the title Comte d'Isle, named after his estate in Languedoc and at times spelt as Comte de Lille. After an arduous journey from Jelgava, he and his family took up residence in the years 1801–1804 at the Łazienki Palace in Warsaw, which after the partitions of Poland became part of the province of South Prussia. According to Wirydianna Fiszerowa, a contemporary living there at the time, the Prussian local authorities, wishing to honour the arrivals, had music played, but trying to give this a national and patriotic character, unwittingly chose La Marseillaise, the hymn of the French Republic with unflattering allusions to both Louis XVI and Louis XVIII. They later apologised for their mistake.

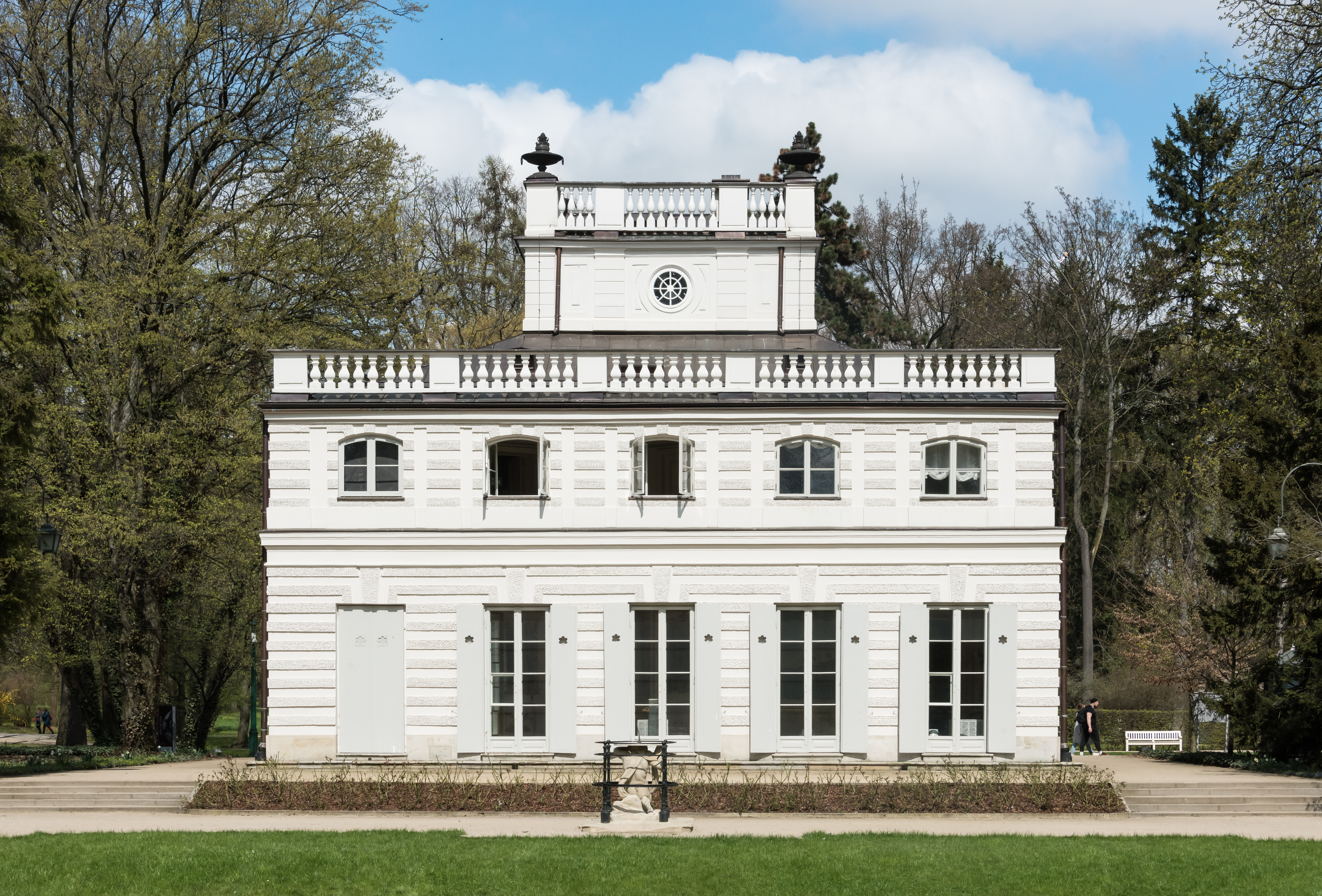
White House in the Łazienki Park, summer residence of Louis XVIII in Warsaw

Initially, Louis resided in the Wasilewski's House, located right next to the Castle Square. However, it soon proved to be too small. In this situation, Ludwika Maria Zamoyska, the sister of the Polish king Stanisław August Poniatowski, offered Louis her nearby palace on the Krakowskie Przedmieście street. Right next to the palace was a church and a monastery of the Discalced Carmelite nuns, where, thanks to the foundation of Louis's aunts, Sophie and Louise, sermons were held in French, which members of the court listened to daily. During the winter, Louis lived in there, while in the summer, he was moving to the so-called White House, small villa-type building in the Łazienki Park, which had been granted to him by the Prussian government.

It was very soon after their arrival that Louis and Marie-Thérèse learned of the death of Tsar Paul I. Louis hoped that Paul's successor, Alexander I, would repudiate his father's banishment of the Bourbons, which he later did. Louis then intended to set off to the Kingdom of Naples. The Count of Artois asked Louis to send his son, Louis-Antoine, and daughter-in-law, Marie-Thérèse, to him in Edinburgh, but the King did not do so at that time. Artois had an allowance from King George III of Great Britain and he sent some money to Louis, whose court-in-exile was not only being spied on by Napoleonic agents but was also being forced to make significant economies, financed as it was mainly from interest owed by the Emperor Francis II on valuables his aunt, Marie Antoinette, had removed from France.

In 1803, Napoleon tried to force Louis XVIII to renounce his right to the throne of France, but Louis refused. In May the following year, 1804, Napoleon declared himself Emperor of the French. In July, Louis XVIII and his nephew departed for Sweden for a Bourbon family conference, where Louis XVIII, the Count of Artois, and the Duke of Angoulême issued a statement condemning Napoleon's move. When the King of Prussia decreed that Louis XVIII would have to leave Prussian territory, and hence Warsaw, Tsar Alexander I invited Louis XVIII to resume residence in Jelgava, which he did. However, having to live under less generous conditions than those enjoyed under Paul I, Louis XVIII decided to embark for England as soon as possible.

As time went on, Louis XVIII realised that France would never accept an attempt to return to the Ancien Régime. Accordingly, in 1805 he reformulated his public policies with a view to reclaiming his throne, issuing a declaration that was far more liberal than his earlier pronouncements. This repudiated his Declaration of Verona, promised to abolish conscription, retain the Napoleonic administrative and judicial system, reduce taxes, eliminate political prisons, and guarantee amnesty to everyone who did not oppose a Bourbon Restoration. The opinions expressed in the declaration were largely those of Antoine de Bésiade, Count of Avaray, Louis's closest advisor in exile.

Louis XVIII was forced once again to leave Jelgava when Tsar Alexander informed him that his safety could not be guaranteed in continental Europe. In July 1807, Louis boarded a Swedish frigate bound for Stockholm, bringing with him only the Duke of Angoulême. This stay in Sweden was short-lived since in November 1807 he disembarked at Great Yarmouth, on the Eastern coast of England. He then took up residence in Gosfield Hall in Essex, leased to him by the Marquess of Buckingham.

=== England, 1807–1814 ===
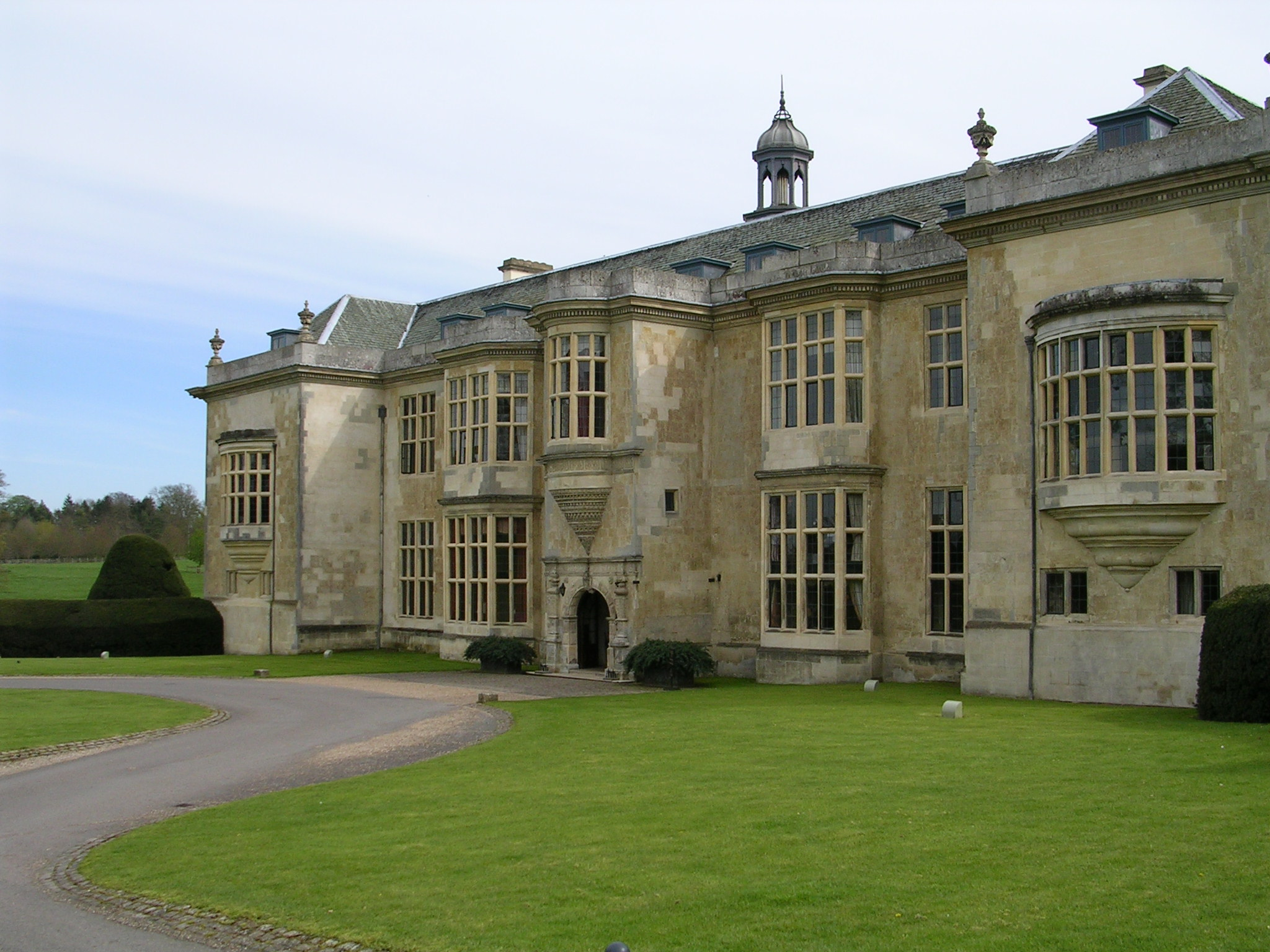
Hartwell House, Buckinghamshire, Louis XVIII's court-in-exile from 1808 until the Restoration

In 1808, Louis brought his wife and queen, Marie Joséphine, to join him in England. His stay at Gosfield Hall did not last long; he soon moved to Hartwell House in Buckinghamshire, where over one hundred courtiers were housed. The King paid £500 in rent each year to the owner of the estate, Sir George Lee. The Prince of Wales (the future George IV) was very charitable to the exiled Bourbons. As Prince Regent, he granted them permanent right of asylum and extremely generous allowances.

The Count of Artois did not join the court-in-exile in Hartwell, preferring to continue his frivolous life in London. Louis's friend the Count of Avaray left Hartwell for Madeira in 1809, and died there in 1811. Louis replaced Avaray with the Comte de Blacas as his principal political advisor. Queen Marie Joséphine died on 13 November 1810. That same winter, Louis had a particularly severe attack of gout, which was a recurring problem for him at Hartwell, and he had to take to a wheelchair.

In 1812, Napoleon I embarked on an invasion of Russia, initiating a war which would prove to be the turning point in his fortunes. The expedition failed miserably, and Napoleon was forced to retreat with an army in tatters.

In 1813, Louis XVIII issued another declaration from Hartwell. The Declaration of Hartwell was even more liberal than his Declaration of 1805, asserting that those who had served Napoleon or the Republic would not suffer repercussions for their acts, and that the original owners of the biens nationaux (lands confiscated from the nobility and clergy during the Revolution) would be compensated for their losses.

Allied troops entered Paris on 31 March 1814. Louis, unable to walk, had sent the Count of Artois to France in January 1814 and issued letters patent appointing Artois Lieutenant-General of the Kingdom in the event of his being restored as king. On 11 April, five days after the French Senate had invited Louis to resume the throne of France, Napoleon I abdicated.

== Bourbon Restoration ==
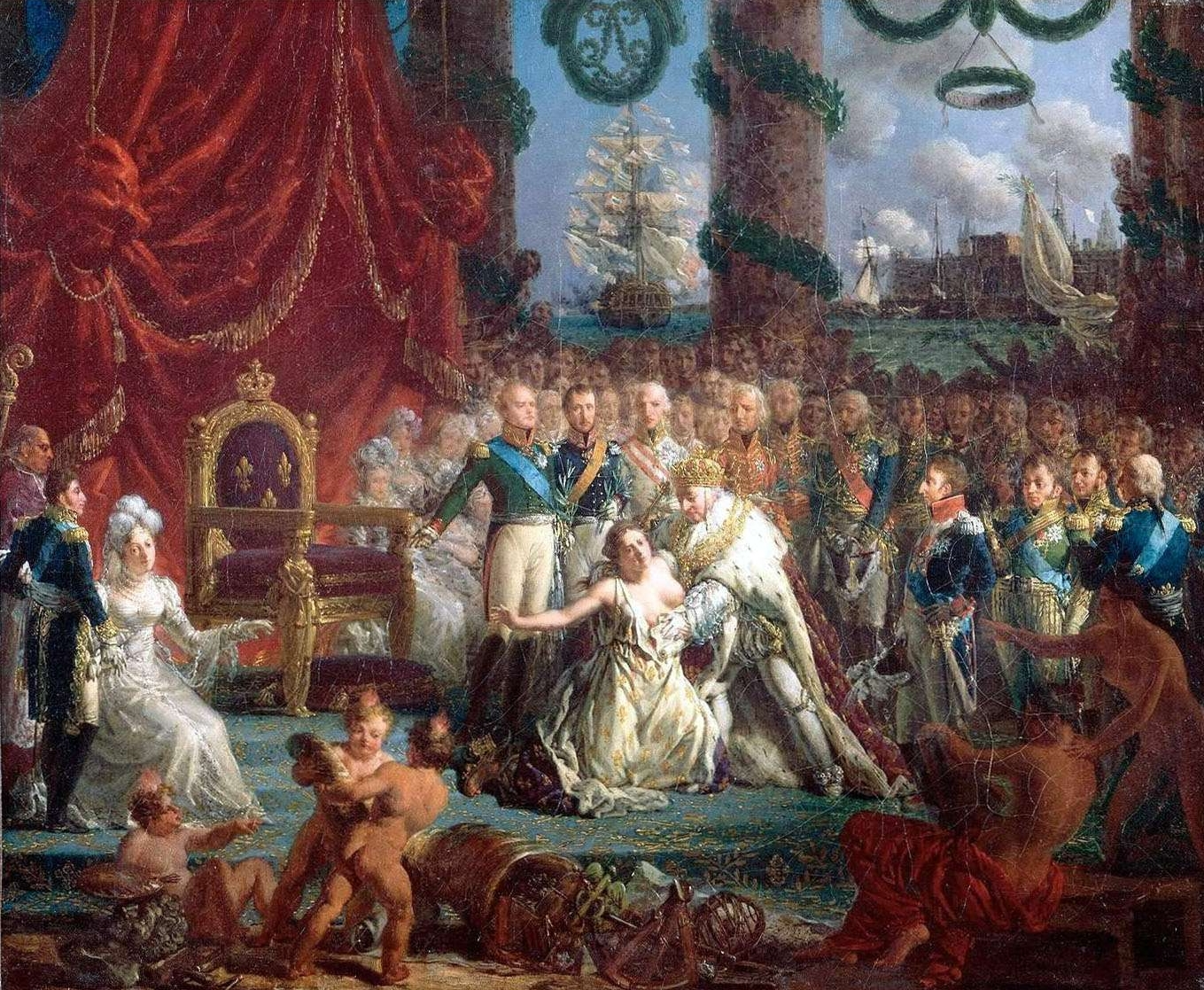
Louis XVIII Raising France from Its Ruins by Louis-Philippe Crépin, 1814

=== First Restoration (1814–1815) ===
The Count of Artois ruled as Lieutenant-General of the Kingdom until his brother's arrival in Paris on 3 May. Upon his return, the King displayed himself to his subjects by staging a procession through the city. He took up residence in the Tuileries Palace the same day. His niece, the Duchess of Angoulême, fainted at the sight of the Tuileries, where she had been imprisoned during the time of the French Revolution.

Napoleon's senate called Louis XVIII to the throne on the condition that he would accept a constitution that entailed recognition of the Republic and the Empire, a bicameral parliament elected every year, and the tri-colour flag of the aforementioned regimes. Louis XVIII opposed the senate's constitution and stated that he was "disbanding the current senate in all the crimes of Bonaparte, and appealing to the French people". The senatorial constitution was burned in a theatre in royalist Bordeaux, and the Municipal Council of Lyon voted for a speech that defamed the senate.

The Great Powers occupying Paris demanded that Louis XVIII implement a constitution. Louis responded with the Charter of 1814, which included many progressive provisions: freedom of religion, a legislature composed of a lower house styled the Chamber of Deputies (Note: Suffrage for the Chamber of Deputies was granted to adult males who paid 300 francs a year in tax.) and an upper house, styled the Chamber of Peers. The press would enjoy a degree of freedom, and there would be a provision that the former owners of the Biens nationaux, confiscated during the Revolution, would be compensated. The constitution had 76 articles. Taxation was to be voted on by the chambers. Catholicism was to be the official religion of France. To be eligible for membership in the Chamber of Deputies, one had to pay over 1,000 francs per year in tax, and be over the age of forty. The King would appoint peers to the Chamber of Peers on a hereditary basis, or for life at his discretion. Deputies would be elected every five years, with one fifth of them up for election each year. There were 90,000 citizens eligible to vote.

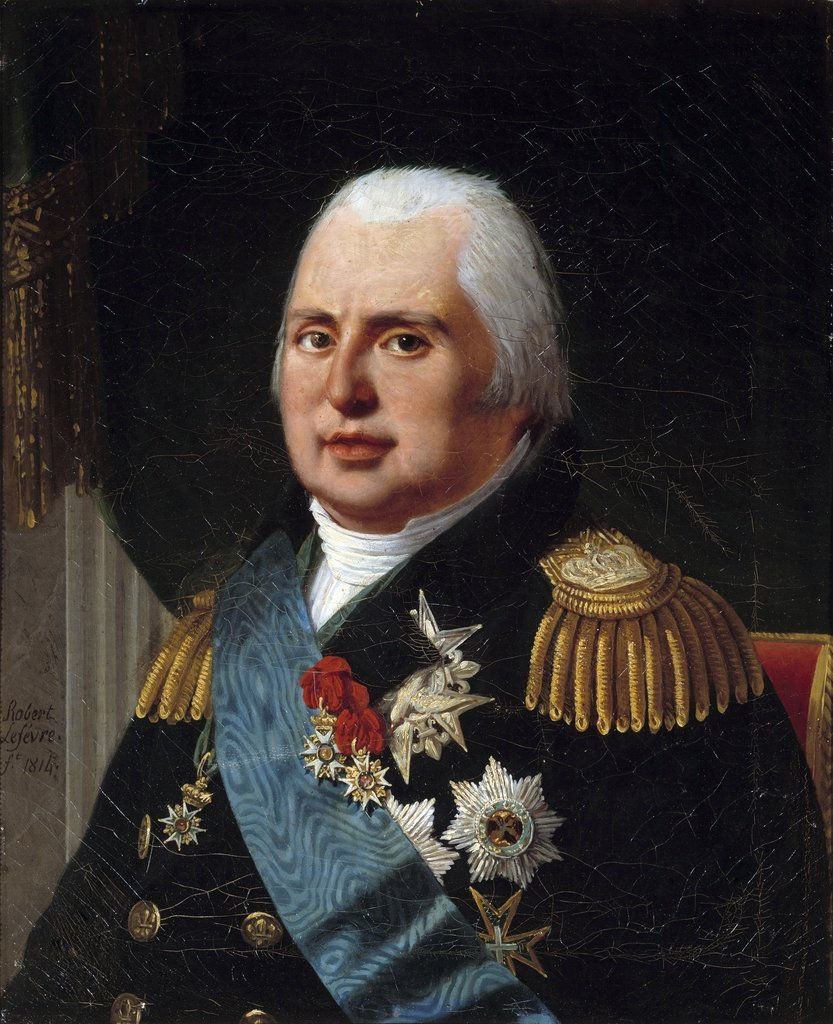
Louis XVIII in 1814

Louis XVIII signed the Treaty of Paris on 30 May 1814. The treaty gave France her 1792 borders, which extended east of the Rhine. She had to pay no war indemnity, and the occupying armies of the Sixth Coalition withdrew immediately from French soil. These generous terms would be reversed in the next Treaty of Paris after the Hundred Days (Napoleon's return to France in 1815).

It did not take Louis XVIII long to go back on one of his many promises. He and his Comptroller-General of Finance Baron Louis were determined not to let the exchequer fall into deficit (there was a 75 million franc debt inherited from Napoleon I), and took fiscal measures to ensure this. Louis XVIII assured the French that the unpopular taxes on tobacco, wine and salt would be abolished when he was restored, but he failed to do so, which led to rioting in Bordeaux. Expenditure on the army was slashed in the 1815 budget – in 1814, the military had accounted for 55% of government spending.

Gold coin of Louis XVIII, struck 1815
First side of the image: Obverse: (French) LOUIS XVIII, ROI DE FRANCE, in English: "Louis XVIII, King of France"
Second side of the image: Reverse: (French) PIECE DE 20 FRANCS, 1815, in English: "20 Franc Piece, 1815"

Louis XVIII admitted the Count of Artois and his nephews the Dukes of Angoulême and of Berry to the Royal Council in May 1814, upon its establishment. The council was informally headed by Prince Talleyrand. Louis XVIII took a large interest in the goings-on of the Congress of Vienna (set up to redraw the map of Europe after Napoleon's demise). Talleyrand represented France at the proceedings. Louis was horrified by Prussia's intention to annex the Kingdom of Saxony, to which he was attached because his mother was born a Saxon princess, and he was also concerned that Prussia would dominate Germany. He also wished the Duchy of Parma to be restored to the Parma branch of the Bourbons, and not to the former Empress Marie-Louise of France, as was being suggested by the Allies. Louis also protested at the Allies' inaction in Naples, where he wanted the Napoleonic usurper Joachim Murat removed in favour of the Neapolitan Bourbons.

On behalf of the Allies, Austria agreed to send a force to the Kingdom of Naples to depose Murat in February 1815, when it was learned that Murat corresponded with Napoleon, which was explicitly forbidden by a recent treaty. In fact, Murat never did actually write to Napoleon, but Louis, intent on restoring the Neapolitan Bourbons at any cost, had taken care to have such a correspondence forged, and subsidised the Austrian expedition with 25 million francs.

Louis XVIII succeeded in getting the Neapolitan Bourbons restored immediately. Parma, however, was bestowed upon Empress Marie-Louise for life, and the Parma Bourbons were given the Duchy of Lucca until the death of Marie-Louise.

=== Hundred Days ===
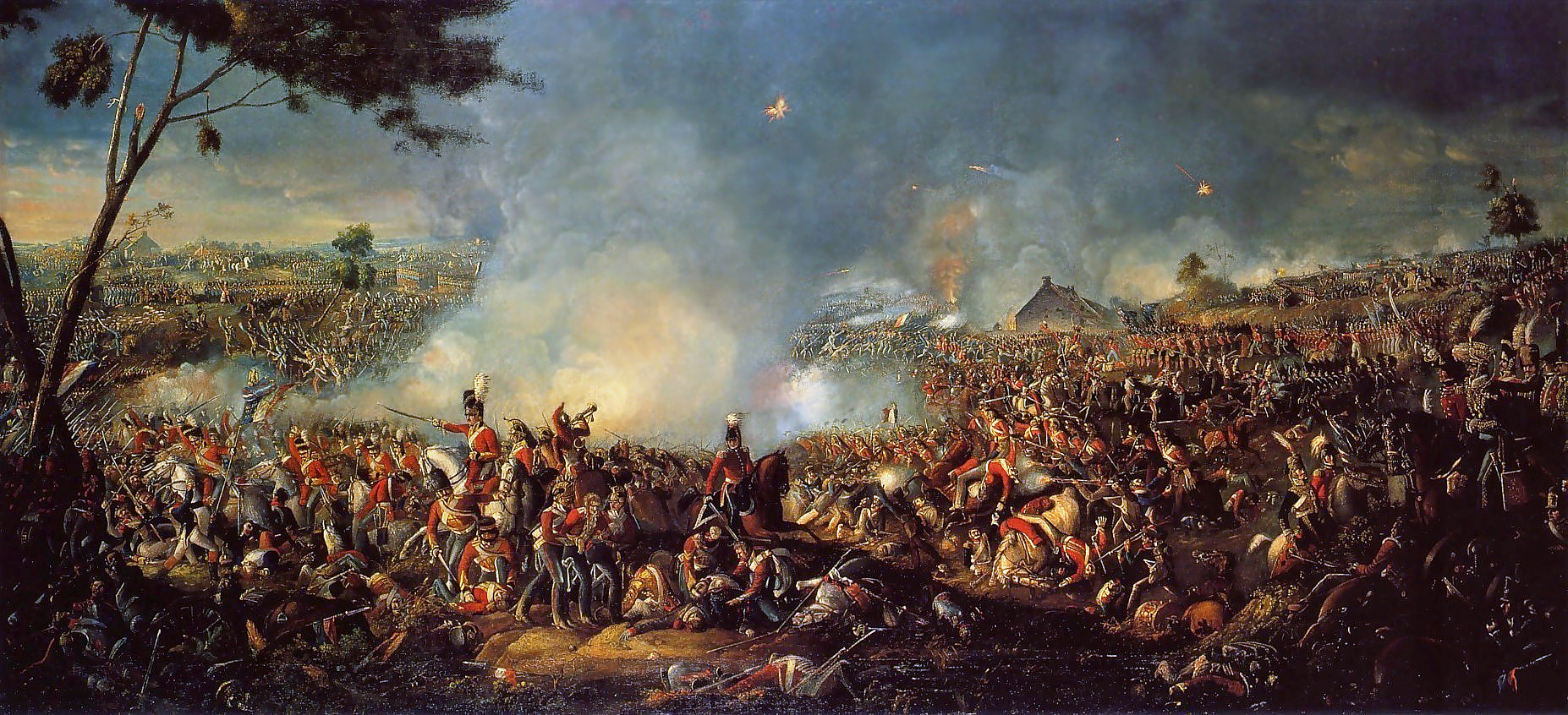
The Battle of Waterloo put a definite end to Napoleon Bonaparte's attempt to return to France and thus secured the Bourbon restoration.

On 26 February 1815, Napoleon Bonaparte escaped his island prison of Elba and embarked for France. He arrived with about 1,000 troops near Cannes on 1 March. Louis XVIII was not particularly worried by Bonaparte's excursion, as such small numbers of troops could be easily overcome. There was, however, a major underlying problem for the Bourbons: Louis XVIII had failed to purge the military of its Bonapartist troops. This led to mass desertions from the Bourbon armies to Bonaparte's. Furthermore, Louis XVIII could not join the campaign against Napoleon in Southern France, because he was having another case of gout. Minister of War Marshal Jean-de-Dieu Soult dispatched Louis Philippe, Duke of Orléans (later King Louis Philippe I), the Count of Artois, and Marshal Étienne MacDonald to apprehend Napoleon.

Louis XVIII's underestimation of Bonaparte proved disastrous. On 19 March, the army stationed outside Paris defected to Bonaparte, leaving the city vulnerable to attack. That same day, Louis XVIII quit the capital with a small escort at midnight, first travelling to Lille, and then crossing the border into the United Kingdom of the Netherlands, halting in Ghent. Other leaders, most prominently Tsar Alexander I, debated whether in the case of a second victory over the French Empire, the Duke of Orléans should be proclaimed king instead of Louis XVIII.

However, Napoleon did not rule France again for very long, suffering a decisive defeat at the hands of the armies of the Duke of Wellington and Field Marshal Blücher at the Battle of Waterloo on 18 June. The Allies came to the consensus that Louis XVIII should be restored to the throne of France.

=== Second Restoration (from 1815) ===
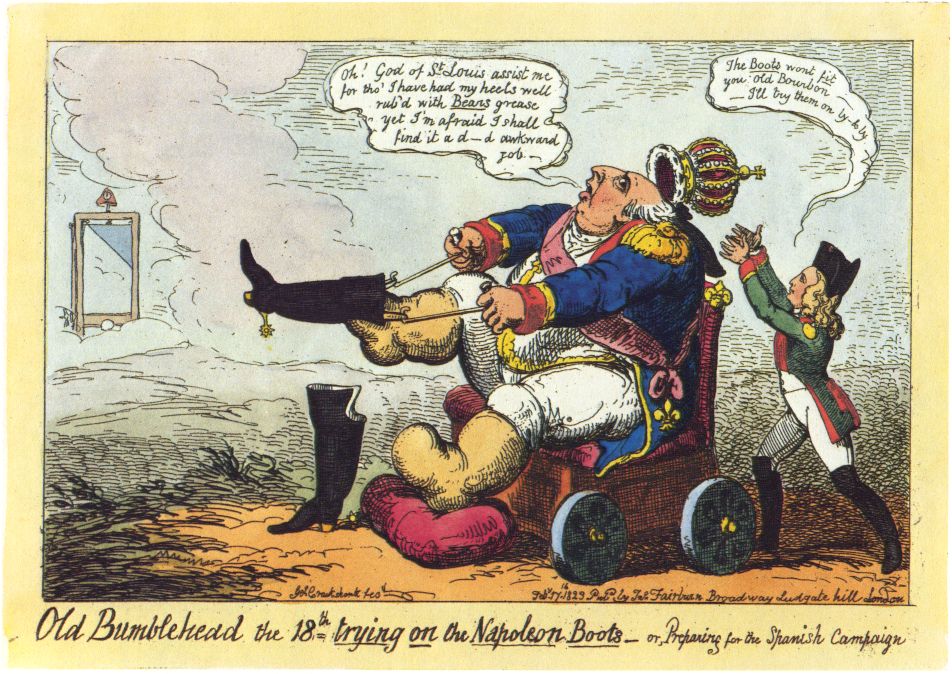
Old Bumblehead the 18th trying on the Napoleon Boots – or, Preparing for the Spanish Campaign, by George Cruikshank, mocking the French intervention in Spain

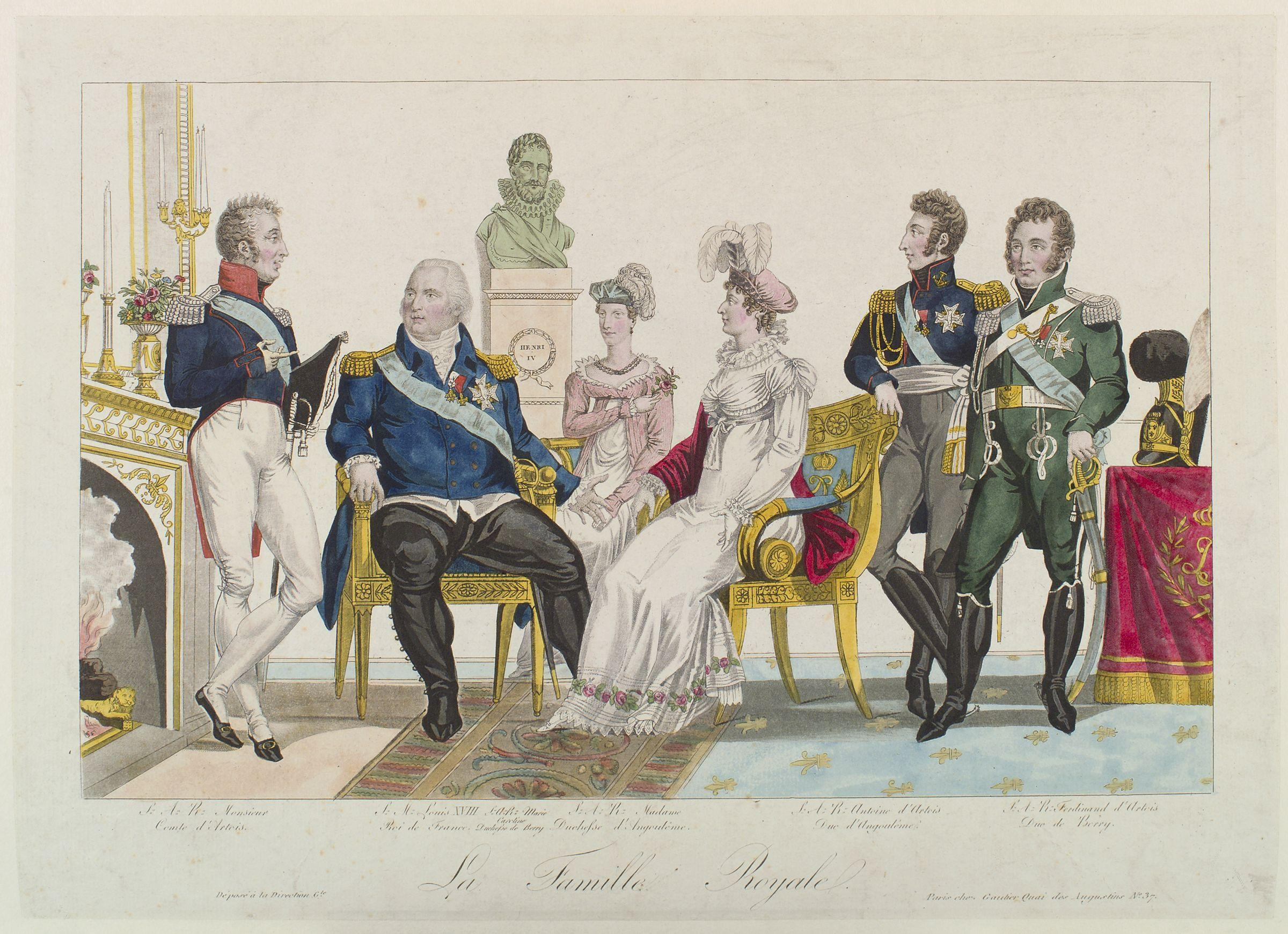
The royal family. From left to right: Charles, Count of Artois, Louis XVIII, Marie Caroline, Duchesse of Berry, Marie Thérèse, Duchesse of Angoulême, Louis Antoine, Duke of Angoulême and Charles Ferdinand, Duke of Berry

Louis returned to France promptly after Napoleon's defeat to ensure his second restoration "in the baggage train of the enemy", i.e. with Wellington's troops. The Duke of Wellington used King Louis' person to open up the route to Paris, as some fortresses refused to surrender to the Allies, but agreed to do so for their king. King Louis arrived at Cambrai on 26 June, where he released a proclamation stating that those who served the Emperor in the Hundred Days would not be persecuted, except for the "instigators". It was also acknowledged that Louis's government might have made mistakes during the First Restoration. King Louis was worried that the counter-revolutionary element sought revenge. He promised to grant a constitution that would guarantee the public debt, freedom of the press and of religion, and equality before the law. It would guarantee the full property rights of those who had purchased national lands during the revolution. He kept his promises.

On 29 June, a deputation of five from among the members of the Chamber of Deputies and the Chamber of Peers approached Wellington about putting a foreign prince on the throne of France. Wellington rejected their pleas outright, declaring that "[Louis is] the best way to preserve the integrity of France" and ordered the delegation to espouse King Louis' cause. The King entered Paris on 8 July to a boisterous reception: the Tuileries Palace gardens were thronged with bystanders, and, according to the Duke of Wellington, the acclamation of the crowds there were so loud during that evening that he could not converse with the King.

Although the Ultra faction of returning exiles wanted revenge and were eager to punish the usurpers and restore the old regime, the new king rejected that advice. He instead called for continuity and reconciliation, and a search for peace and prosperity. The exiles were not given back their lands and property, although they eventually received repayment in the form of bonds. The Catholic Church was favoured. The electorate was limited to the richest men in France, most of whom had supported Napoleon. In foreign policy he removed Talleyrand, and continued most of Napoleon's policies in peaceful fashion. He kept to the policy of minimizing Austria's role but reversed Napoleon's friendly overtures to Spain and the Ottomans.

The King's role in politics was voluntarily diminished; he assigned most of his duties to his council. During the summer of 1815, he and his ministry embarked on a series of reforms. The Royal Council, an informal group of ministers that advised Louis, was dissolved and replaced by a tighter knit privy council, the "Ministère du Roi". Artois, Berry and Angoulême were purged from the new "ministère", and Talleyrand was appointed as the first Président du Conseil, i.e. Prime Minister of France. On 14 July, the ministry dissolved the units of the army deemed "rebellious". Hereditary peerage was re-established by the ministry at Louis' behest.

In August, elections for the Chamber of Deputies returned unfavourable results for Talleyrand. The ministry hoped for moderate deputies, but the electorate voted almost exclusively for ultra-royalists, resulting in what King Louis called the Chambre introuvable. The Duchess of Angoulême and the Count of Artois pressured King Louis for the dismissal of his obsolete ministry. Talleyrand tendered his resignation on 20 September. Louis chose the Duke of Richelieu to be his new Prime Minister. Richelieu was chosen because he was acceptable to Louis' family and to the reactionary Chamber of Deputies. Louis dissolved the Chambre introuvable on 5 September 1816, after a rise in anti-monarchical sentiments.

Anti-Napoleonic sentiment was high in Southern France, and this was prominently displayed in the White Terror, which saw the purge of all important Napoleonic officials from government, along with the execution or assassination of others. Popular vengeance led to barbarous acts against some of these officials. Guillaume Marie Anne Brune (a Napoleonic marshal) was savagely assassinated, and his remains thrown into the Rhône River. Louis publicly deplored such illegal acts, but vehemently supported the prosecution of those marshals of the army who had helped Napoleon in the Hundred Days. Louis's government executed Napoleon's Marshal Michel Ney in December 1815 for treason. The King's confidants Charles François, Marquis de Bonnay, and Louis, duc de La Chastre advised him to inflict firm punishments on the "traitors".

The King was reluctant to shed blood, and this greatly irritated the ultra-reactionary Chamber of Deputies, who felt that Louis was not executing enough. The government issued a proclamation of amnesty to the "traitors" in January 1816, but such trials as had already begun took their course. That same declaration also banned any member of the House of Bonaparte from owning property in, or entering, France. It is estimated that between 50,000 – 80,000 officials were purged from the government during what was known as the Second White Terror.

In November 1815, Louis's government had to sign another Treaty of Paris that formally ended Napoleon's Hundred Days. The previous treaty had been quite favourable to France, but this one took a hard line. France's borders were now less extensive, being drawn back to their 1790 extent. France had to pay for an army to occupy her, for at least five years, at a cost of 150 million francs per year. France also had to pay a war indemnity of 700 million francs to the Allies.

In 1818, the Chambers passed a military law that increased the size of the army by over 100,000. In October of the same year, Louis's foreign minister, the Duke of Richelieu, succeeded in convincing the Allied Powers to withdraw their armies early in exchange for a sum of over 200 million francs.

Louis chose many centrist cabinets, as he wanted to appease the populace, much to the dismay of his brother, the ultra-royalist Count of Artois. Louis always dreaded the day he would die, believing that his brother, and heir, Artois, would abandon the centrist government for an ultra-royalist autocracy, which would not bring favourable results.

King Louis disliked the premier prince du sang, Louis-Philippe d'Orléans, and took every opportunity to snub him, denying him the title of "Royal Highness", partly out of resentment for the Duke's father's role in voting for Louis XVI's execution. Louis XVIII's nephew, Charles Ferdinand, Duke of Berry, was assassinated at the Paris Opera on 14 February 1820. The royal family was grief-stricken and Louis broke an ancient tradition by attending his nephew's funeral, whereas previous kings of France could not have any association with death. The death of the Duke of Berry meant that the House of Orléans was more likely to succeed to the throne.

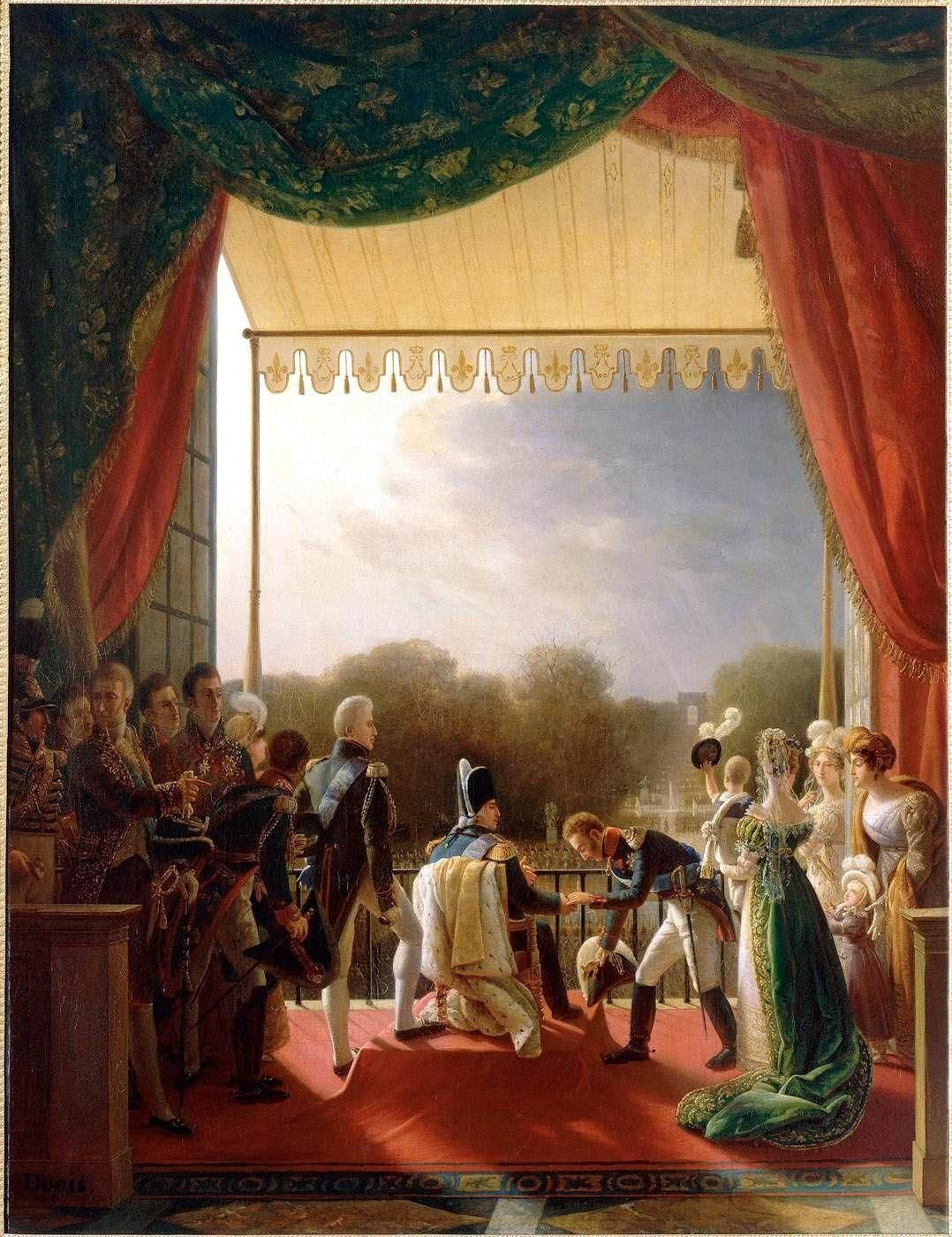
Louis XVIII on a balcony of the Tuileries Palace receiving the Duke of Angoulême after his successful military campaign in Spain

Berry was the only member of the family thought to be able to beget children. His wife gave birth to a posthumous son in September, Henry, Duke of Bordeaux, nicknamed Dieudonné (God-given) by the Bourbons because he was thought to have secured the future of the dynasty. However the Bourbon succession was still in doubt. The Chamber of Deputies proposed amending Salic law to allow the Duchess of Angoulême to accede to the throne. On 12 June 1820, the Chambers ratified legislation that increased the number of deputies from 258 to 430. The extra deputies were to be elected by the wealthiest quarter of the population in each département. These individuals now effectively had two votes. Around the same time as the "law of the two votes", Louis began to receive visits every Wednesday from a lady named Zoé Talon, and ordered that nobody should disturb him while he was with her. It was rumoured that he inhaled snuff from her breasts, which earned her the nickname of tabatière (snuffbox). In 1823, France embarked on a military intervention in Spain, where a revolt had occurred against King Ferdinand VII. France succeeded in crushing the rebellion, in a campaign headed by the Duke of Angoulême.

=== Death ===
Louis XVIII's health began to fail in the spring of 1824. He was experiencing obesity, gout and gangrene, both dry and wet, in his legs and spine. Louis died on 16 September 1824 surrounded by the extended royal family and some government officials. He was succeeded by his youngest brother, the Count of Artois, as Charles X. As a historical footnote, the young science of disinfection had advanced in the early 1820s to the point where it was recognized that chlorides of lime could be used to both eliminate smells and slow decomposition. The body of Louis XVIII was washed with chlorides by a French scientist, Antoine Germain Labarraque, permitting his corpse to be "presented to the public without any odour" (emphasis in the original) in 1824.

== Honours ==
- Kingdom of France:
  - Knight of the Order of the Holy Spirit, 2 February 1767
  - Grand Master and Knight of the Order of Saint Michael
  - Grand Master and Grand Croix of the Legion of Honour
  - Grand Master and Grand Croix of the Order of Saint Louis
  - Grand Master and Grand Croix of the Order of Saint Lazarus
- Austrian Empire: Grand Cross of the Order of St. Stephen, 31 August 1815
- Denmark: Knight of the Order of the Elephant, 25 January 1818
- Kingdom of Portugal: Grand Cross of the Sash of the Three Orders, 10 October 1823
- Kingdom of Prussia:
  - Knight of the Order of the Black Eagle, 17 July 1815
  - Grand Cross of the Order of the Red Eagle, 31 August 1815
- Russian Empire:
  - Knight of the Order of St. Andrew, 5 March 1800
  - Knight of the Order of St. Alexander Nevsky, 5 March 1800
- Spain: Knight of the Order of the Golden Fleece, 22 May 1767
- United Kingdom: Stranger Knight of the Order of the Garter, 21 April 1814

Louis XVIII was the last French monarch, and the only one after 1774, to die while still ruling. He was interred at the Basilica of St Denis, the necropolis of French kings.

=== Succession ===
The French line of succession upon the death of Louis XVIII in 1824.

- Louis XV (1710–1774)
  - Louis, Dauphin of France (1729–1765)
    - Louis, Duke of Burgundy (1751–1761)
    - Louis XVI (1754–1793)
      - Louis Joseph, Dauphin of France (1781–1789)
      - Louis XVII (1785–1795)
    - Louis XVIII (1755–1824)
    - (1) Charles, Count of Artois (b. 1757)
      - (2) Louis Antoine, Duke of Angoulême (b. 1775)
      - Charles Ferdinand, Duke of Berry (1778–1820)
        - (3) Henri, Duke of Bordeaux (b. 1820)

== Ancestors ==
8. Louis, Duke of Burgundy
4. Louis XV of France
9. Marie Adélaïde of Savoy
2. Louis, Dauphin of France
10. Stanisław I Leszczyński
5. Marie Leszczyńska
11. Katarzyna Opalińska
1. Louis XVIII of France
12. Augustus II of Poland
6. Augustus III of Poland
13. Christiane Eberhardine of Bayreuth
3. Maria Josepha of Saxony
14. Joseph I, Holy Roman Emperor
7. Maria Josepha of Austria
15. Wilhelmine Amalia of Brunswick

== See also ==
- List of works by James Pradier

== Notes ==
Louis XVIII House of Bourbon Cadet branch of the Capetian dynasty Born: 17 November 1755 Died: 16 September 1824
Regnal titles
Vacant Napoleon I as emperor Himself as titular king Title last held by Louis XVI	King of France; 11 April 1814 – 20 March 1815	Vacant Napoleon I as emperor Himself as titular king
Vacant Napoleon II as emperor Himself as titular king	King of France; 7 July 1815 – 16 September 1824	Succeeded by Charles X
French nobility
Vacant Title last held by Philippe	Duke of Anjou; 1771 – 1790	Vacant Title next held by Jacques
Royal titles
Preceded by Philippe de France	Monsieur; 1774–1793	Succeeded by Charles Philippe de France
Titles in pretence
Loss of title	— TITULAR — King of France; 20 March 1815 – 7 July 1815; Reason for succession failure: Hundred Days	Succeeded by Himself
Preceded by Louis XVII	— TITULAR — King of France; 8 June 1795 – 11 April 1814; Reason for succession failure: Monarchy abolished in 1792	Succeeded by Himself
