= Esparbès de Lussan family =

French noble family

Coat of arms of the Esparbès de Lussan family

The Esparbès de Lussan family is an ancient French noble house from Armagnac in France. Its name is mentioned in a number of 12th, 13th, and 14th century charters. One of its most notable members is Louise d'Esparbès de Lussan, mistress to the future Charles X of France.
