= White House, Warsaw =

White House
- Biały Dom
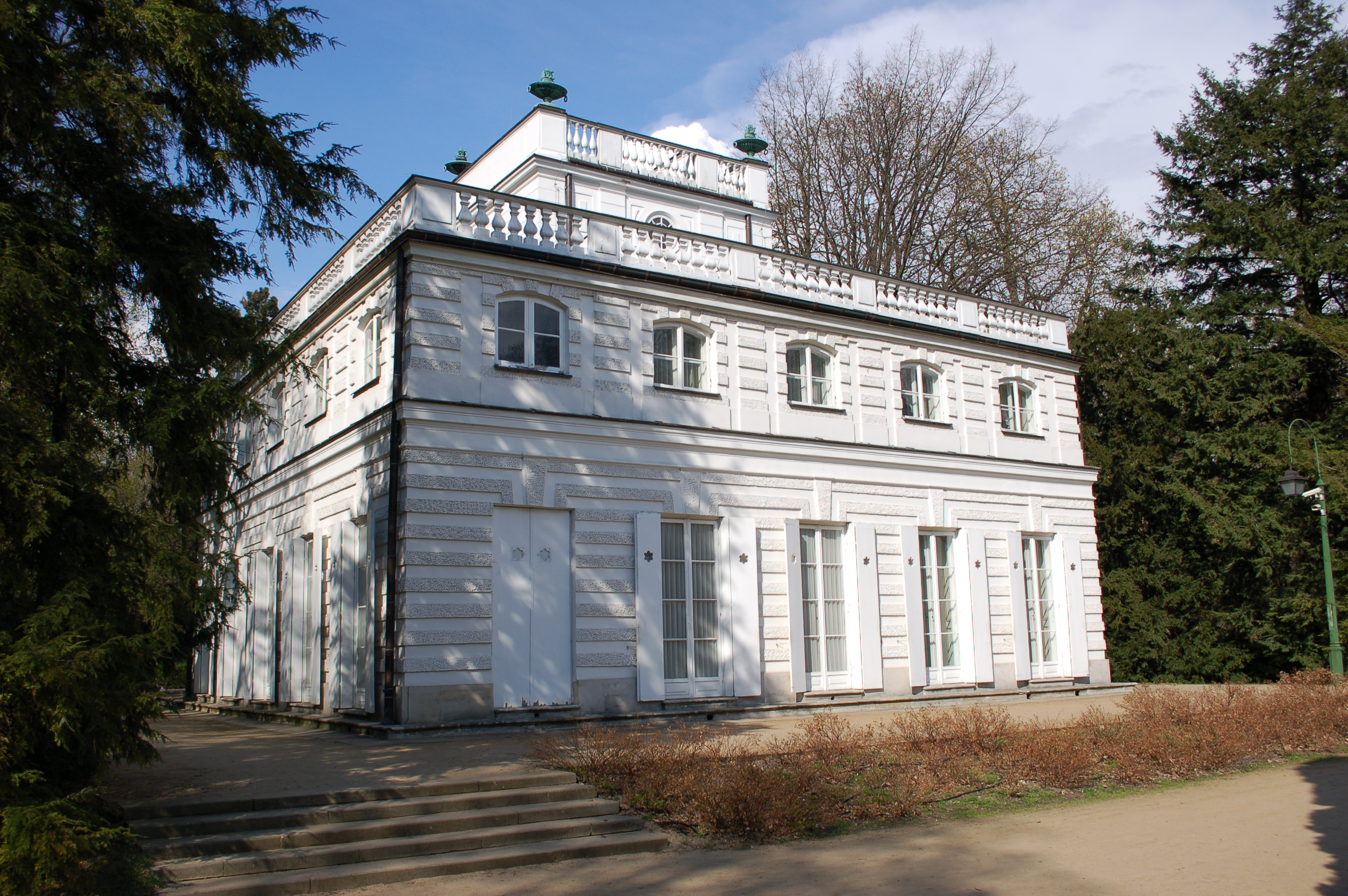
- White House from the Royal Promenade
- Interactive map of the White House area

General information
- Type: Villa
- Architectural style: Neoclassical
- Location: Łazienki Park, Warsaw, Poland
- Coordinates: 52°12′55″N 21°01′53″E
- Completed: 1774
- Renovated: 2017-2019

Technical details
- Floor count: 2

Design and construction
- Architect: Domenico Merlini

The White House (Polish: Biały Dom) or the Little White House (Polish: Biały Domek) is a historic villa-style building located in the Łazienki Park in Warsaw. It was the first structure on the site to be built in 1774 by order of the Polish king Stanisław August as part of the construction of the royal residence complex known as the Royal Baths.

== History ==
Stanisław August acquired the Łazienki estate, along with Ujazdów and its castle, from the Lubomirski family even before ascending the throne. Soon after, he began transforming the Łazienki grounds into an English landscape garden, with the first completed building being the White House, erected in 1774 and most likely designed by Domenico Merlini. The decoration of the interiors continued until 1777. Due to the marshy nature of the terrain, a canal was dug around the house, and in 1778, an annex was built nearby, where the kitchen was relocated from the basement.

It was conceived as a royal summer residence, as evidenced by its lavish furnishings and exquisite interior decorations. However, the king rarely stayed there, and the primary residents were his sisters, Izabella Branicka and Ludwika Zamoyska, as well as Teresa née Kinsky, the mother of Prince Józef Poniatowski.

After the king's death in 1798, the White House, along with the entire Łazienki estate, became the property of his nephew, Józef Poniatowski, and later his sister, Maria Teresa Tyszkiewicz. In 1817, the Tsar of Russia and the King of Congress Poland, Alexander I, purchased the entire Łazienki estate, and it remained the property of the Romanov family for the next one hundred years.

Between 1801 and 1804, the building served as the summer residence of the future King of France, Louis XVIII, who lived in Warsaw under the name Comte de Lille. With the permission of the Prussian government, he resided there with his family and court.

The White House has survived almost intact to the present day. In the 19th century, the canal was filled in, and in 1932, the kitchen building was demolished. During World War I, retreating Russian troops took part of the furnishings with them. During World War II, the White House avoided major destruction, and most of its rooms retained their original appearance.

Between 2017 and 2019, the building underwent a thorough renovation and interior decoration conservation.

== Architecture and decorations ==
The building has a perfectly symmetrical design—each side featured five identical window-doors on the ground floor and five windows on the upper floor. The building has thick brick walls, is built on a square plan, and is topped with a wooden balustrade on the roof and a squat belvedere at the summit. In front of the White House, a statue of a satyr, created by Étienne Maurice Falconet, was placed. The satyr carried a sundial plate crafted in 1777 by Józef Hegel. The interiors were designed by Jan Bogumił Plersch and Jan Ścisło, with dominant Oriental motifs, particularly Chinese landscapes and decorative wallpapers.

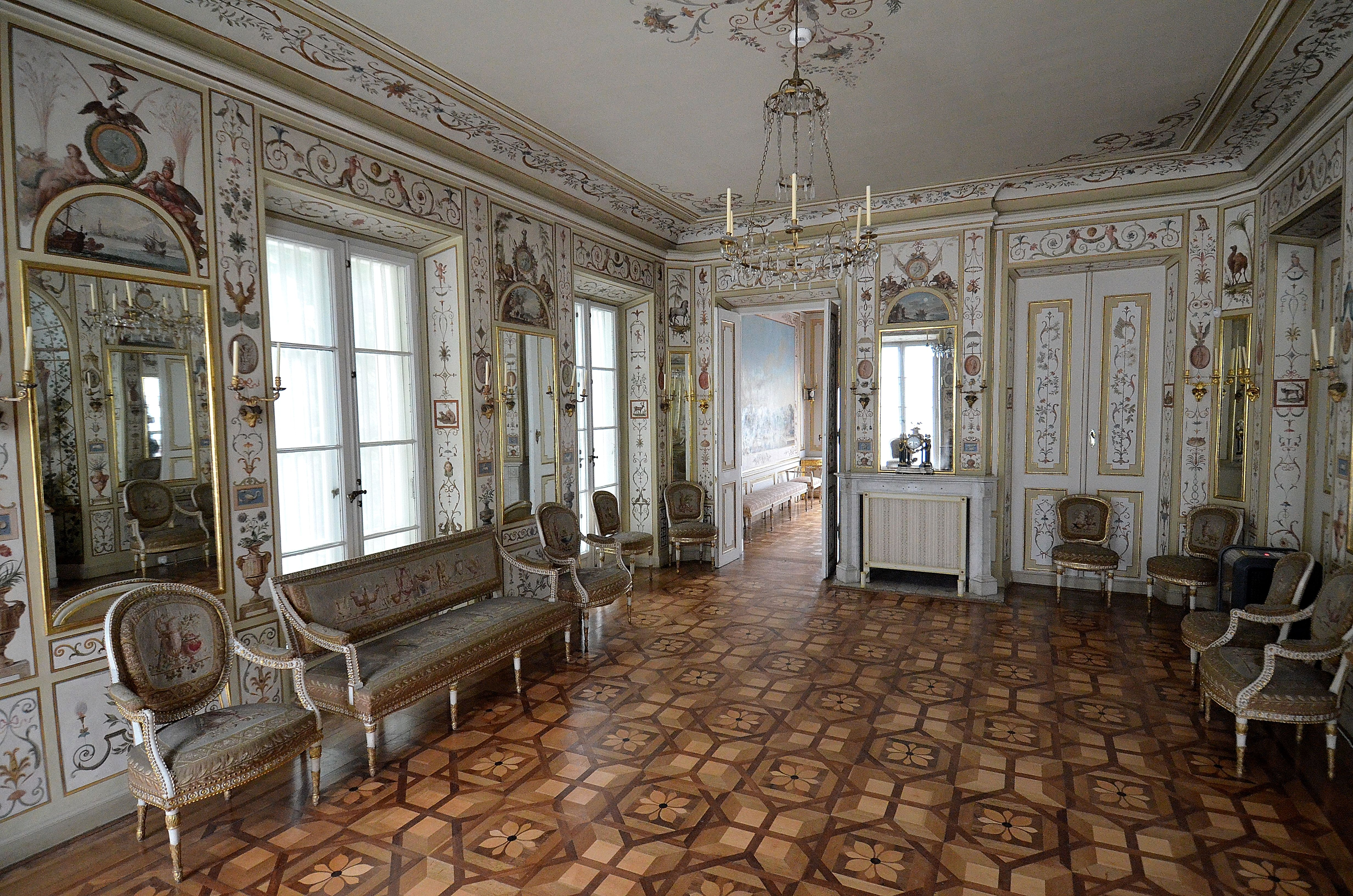
Dining Room with grotesque decorations

On the eastern side of the building are its two most impressive rooms: the Dining Room and the Play Room. The Dining Room is adorned with grotesques styled after ancient motifs, inspired by the originally antique statue of Venus Anadyomene, a work attributed to Praxiteles, purchased for the king by André-Jean Lebrun. The interior decoration is structured along a north-south axis, marked by the personifications of the Sun and Moon (Apollo and Diana), as well as symbols of the continents and depictions of their inhabitants. In the corners of the northern wall (facing south) are representations of Africa and America, while on the opposite side, Europe and Asia are depicted in the same manner. The room’s décor also includes personifications of the winds, representations of ancient deities, and their corresponding zodiac signs. The room's decoration includes numerous Masonic elements and references to the Rosicrucian movement, which the king supported. In 1777, during the decoration of the house, he joined the Rosicrucian lodge Stricte Observantia. As a result, the room's décor is dominated by roses, while Masonic symbols include beehives with flying bees and five-pointed stars.

== Bibliography ==
- Dobrowolski, Witold (2012). "Program ikonograficzny Sali Jadalnej Białego Domu w Łazienkach Królewskich w Warszawie. Wenus - Izyda - Masoneria" (PDF). Rocznik Historii Sztuki (37).
- Kraushar, Aleksander (1899). Burboni na wygnaniu w Mitawie i Warszawie. Szkic historyczny (1798-1805) [The Bourbons in Exile in Mitau and Warsaw: A Historical Sketch (1798-1805)] (in Polish).
