= Louise de Polastron =

French noblewoman

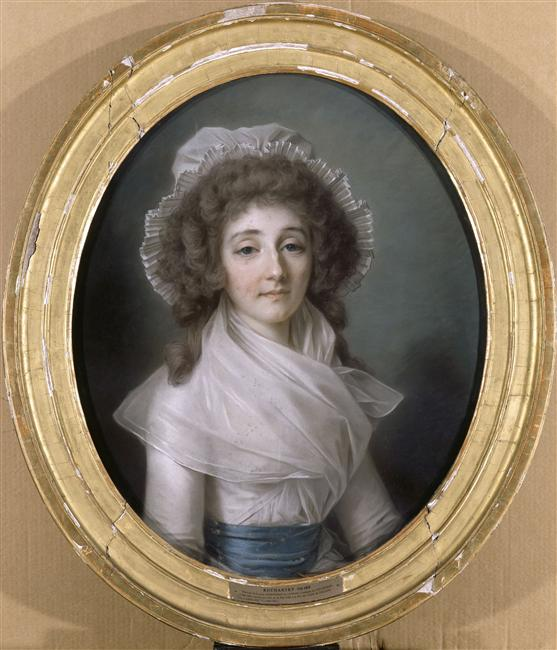
Pastel of Louise d'Esparbès de Lussan by Alexandre Kucharski

Marie Louise d’Esparbès de Lussan, by marriage vicomtesse then comtesse de Polastron (Bardigues, 19 October 1764 – London, 27 March 1804) was a French lady-in-waiting, known as the mistress of the comte d’Artois, who later reigned as Charles X of France.

== Life ==
A member of the Esparbès de Lussan family as the daughter of Louis François d’Esparbès de Lussan and Marie Catherine Julie Rougeot (1746–1764). She was educated at the Pentemont Abbey alongside many other daughters of the aristocracy.

In 1780, she married Denis de Polastron (1758–1821), half-brother to Yolande de Polastron, duchess of Polignac, governess of the royal children and intimate friend of the queen. In 1782, she was appointed dame du palais (lady-in-waiting) to queen Marie Antoinette, and served as such until the outbreak of the French Revolution in 1789.

The comte d’Artois first saw Louise at the Versailles court, and they initiated a lifelong relationship in 1785. She was described as "a gentle and retiring woman". He became so lastingly attached to her that he made her his "favorite" in title. They had no children.

Immediately after the outbreak of the French Revolution in July 1789, Louise de Polastron left France along with the comte d’Artois and the entire Polignac family. She and Artois continued to live together in exile. In 1791, she lived with Artois in Koblenz, where she was termed as one of the 'Queens of the Emigration' of the French exile emigree court along with the mistress of the prince of Condé, the Princess of Monaco, and the mistress of the count of Provence, Anne de Balbi. In 1792, Louise de Polastron accompanied Artois to Edinburgh in Scotland, where she lived with him in Holyrood.

During the stay of the count of Provence in Warsaw, when he was contemplating a move to Naples, the duke and the duchess of Angoulême answered that they would in that case be forced to join Artois in Scotland instead, as Artois considered Italy too dangerous, which caused the plans to be aborted, as the count of Provence pointed out that it would be impossible (because of contemporary social standards) for the duchess of Angoulême to live in Holyrood because of the position there of Louise de Polastron.

When she died of tuberculosis in 1804, the comte d’Artois was so deeply attached to her that he decided to swear a vow of perpetual chastity. He kept the vow after her death, and also became devoted to religion, often enthusiastically supporting the Ultramontanist movement within France's Roman Catholic Church.

== Sources ==
- (in French) Georges Bordonove, Charles X : dernier roi de France et de Navarre, Paris, Pygmalion, coll. "Les Rois qui ont fait la France", 1990 ISBN 978-2-85704-323-2
- (in French) André Castelot, Charles X : La fin d’un monde, Paris, Perrin, 1988 ISBN 978-2-262-00545-0
- (in French) Yves Griffon, Charles X : roi méconnu, Paris, Rémi Perrin, 1999 ISBN 978-2-913960-00-8
- (in French) Éric Le Nabour, Charles X : le dernier roi, preface by Alain Decaux, Paris, Éditions Jean-Claude Lattès

== Bibliography ==
- (in French) Jules Bertaut, Les Belles Émigrées, Paris, Club du meilleur livre, 1953
- (in French) Monique de Huertas, Louise de Polastron : le grand amour du comte d’Artois, Paris, Perrin, 1983 – ISBN 2-262-00301-7
- (in French) Frédéric de Reiset, Louise d’Esparbès, comtesse de Polastron, Paris, Émile Paul, 1907
