= Antoine Louis François de Bésiade =

French nobleman

Antoine Louis François de Bésiade (1759–1811) was a French nobleman and favourite of the future Louis XVIII.
