= Prince Maurizio, Duke of Montferrat =

Maurizio of Savoy
- Duke of Montferrat
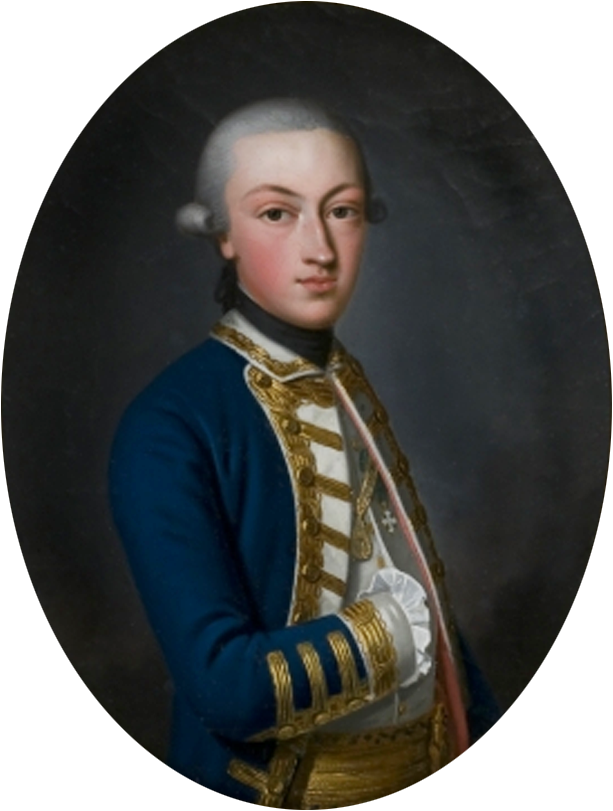
- Born: 13 December 1762; Royal Palace of Turin, Turin
- Died: 1 September 1799 (aged 36); Palazzo Carcassona, Sardinia
- Burial: Cathedral of Alghero, Sardinia
Names
- Maurizio Giuseppe Maria di Savoia
- House: House of Savoy
- Father: Victor Amadeus III
- Mother: Maria Antonia Ferdinanda of Spain

Prince Maurizio of Savoy, Duke of Montferrat (Maurizio Giuseppe Maria; 13 December 1762 – 1 September 1799) was a member of the Royal House of Savoy.

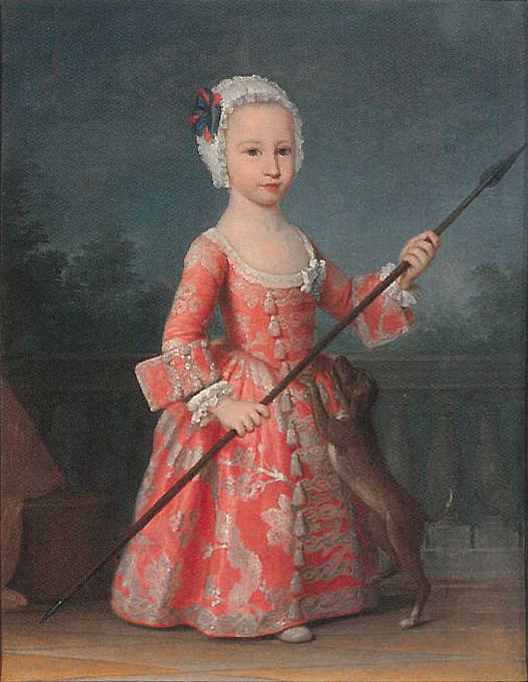
Prince Maurizio as a young child, portrait by Giuseppe Duprà.

He was born at the Royal Palace of Turin in 1762. Maurizio was the ninth child but the fourth son of King Victor Amadeus of Savoy (then styled the "Duke of Savoy") and Queen Maria Antonia Ferdinanda of Spain. He was styled the Duke of Montferrat from birth. The capital of Montferrat, Casale Monferrato, was the scene of great celebration at his birth in his honour. As a royal prince, he received an appanage of 20 Million Piedmont scudo.

To escape the threat of Napoleon I, the duke of Montferrat fled to Sardinia with his brothers Victor Emmanuel and Charles Felix where the trio lived in the Palazzo Carcassona.

His oldest brother Charles Emmanuel fled to Rome. In June 1799 his brother Charles Emmanuel created him Governor of the province of Sassari. Montferrat died on the island in 1799. He died of malaria and was buried at the Cathedral of Alghero. His younger brother Giuseppe, Count of Asti also died of malaria in 1802.

== Ancestry ==
Ancestors of Prince Maurizio, Duke of Montferrat

8. Victor Amadeus II of Sardinia
4. Charles Emmanuel III of Sardinia
9. Anne Marie of Orléans
2. Victor Amadeus III of Sardinia
10. Ernest Leopold, Landgrave of Hesse-Rotenburg
5. Polyxena of Hesse-Rotenburg
11. Eleonore of Löwenstein-Wertheim-Rochefort
1. Maurizio of Savoy
12. Louis, Dauphin of France
6. Philip V of Spain
13. Maria Anna Victoria of Bavaria
3. Maria Antonia Ferdinanda of Spain
14. Odoardo Farnese, Hereditary Prince of Parma
7. Elisabeth Farnese
15. Dorothea Sophie of the Palatinate
