= Maria Antonia Ferdinanda of Spain =

Queen of Sardinia from 1773 to 1785

Maria Antonia Ferdinanda
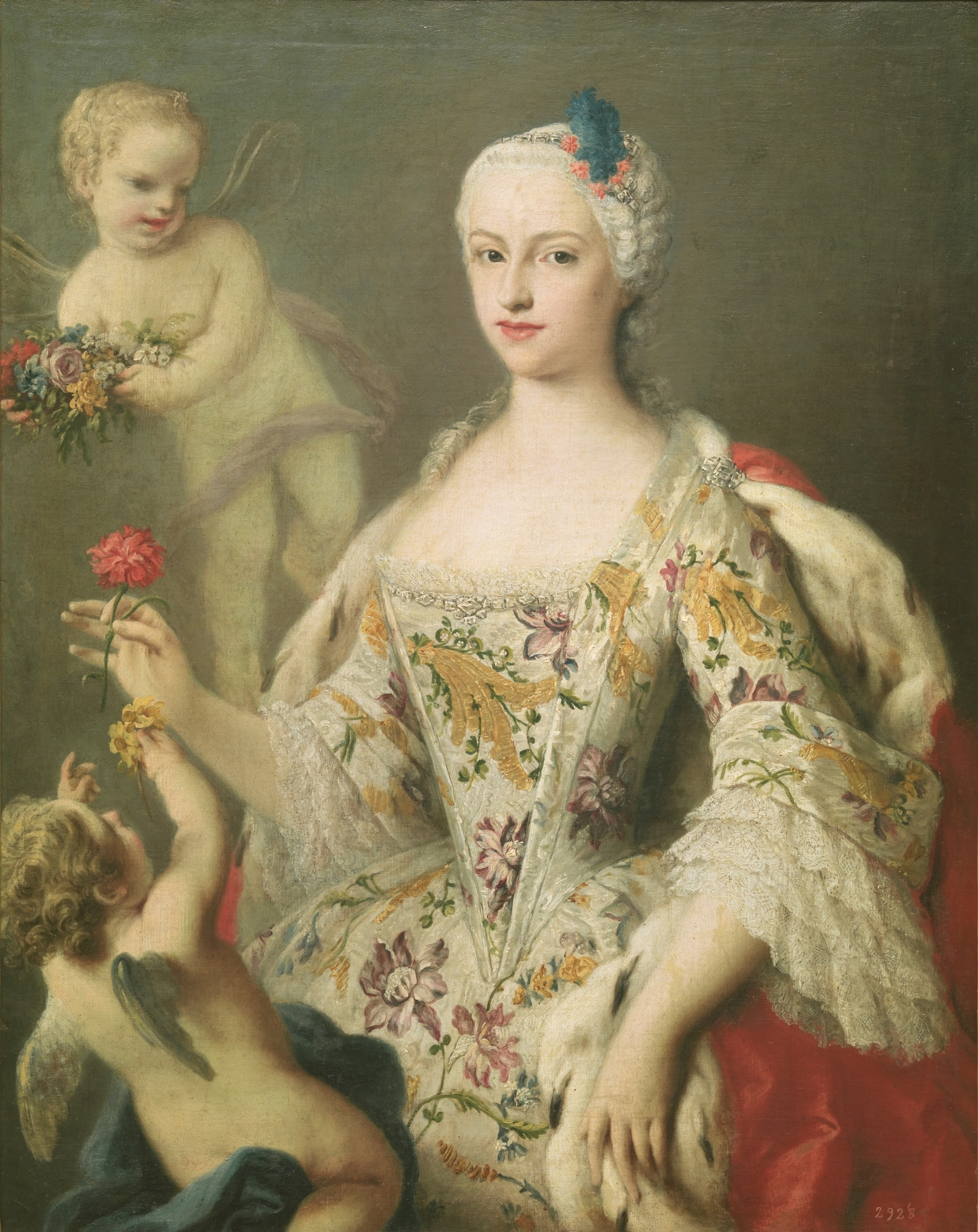
- Portrait by Jacopo Amigoni, 1750

Queen consort of Sardinia
- Tenure: 20 February 1773 – 19 September 1785
- Born: 17 November 1729; Alcázar of Seville, Spain
- Died: 19 September 1785 (aged 55); Castle of Moncalieri, Turin, Kingdom of Sardinia
- Burial: September 1785; Basilica of Superga, Turin
- Spouse: Victor Amadeus III of Sardinia (m. 1750)
- Issue Detail: Charles Emmanuel IV, King of Sardinia; Princess Maria Elisabetta Carlotta; Marie Joséphine, Countess of Provence; Marie Thérèse, Countess of Artois; Maria Anna, Duchess of Chablais; Victor Emmanuel I, King of Sardinia; Princess Maria Cristina Ferdinanda; Maurizio, Duke of Montferrat; Maria Carolina, Electoral Princess of Saxony; Charles Felix, King of Sardinia; Giuseppe, Count of Asti
Names
- Spanish: María Antonia Fernanda de Borbón y Farnesio
- House: Bourbon
- Father: Philip V of Spain
- Mother: Elisabeth Farnese

Maria Antonia Ferdinanda of Spain (María Antonia Fernanda; 17 November 1729 – 19 September 1785) was Queen of Sardinia by marriage to King Victor Amadeus III. She was the youngest daughter of Philip V of Spain and Elisabeth Farnese. She was the mother of the last three mainline kings of Sardinia.

== Life ==
=== Early years ===
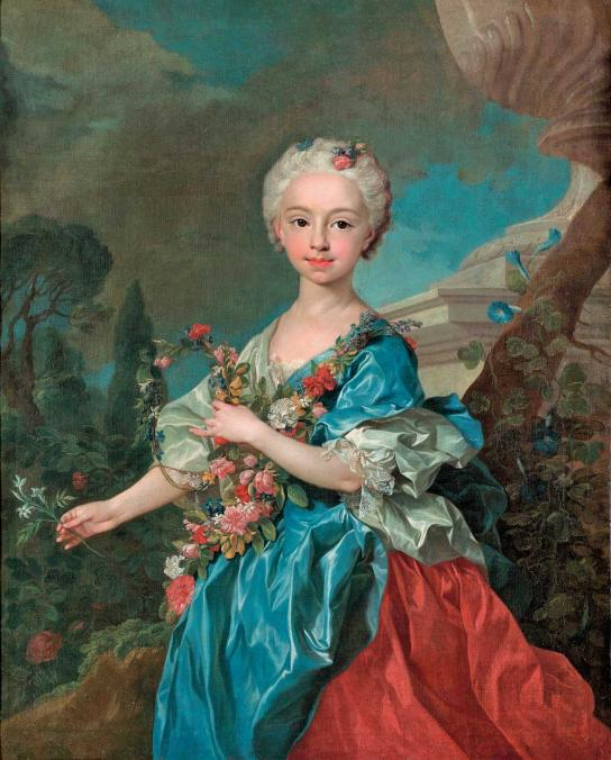
Maria Antonia as a child, by Louis-Michel van Loo.

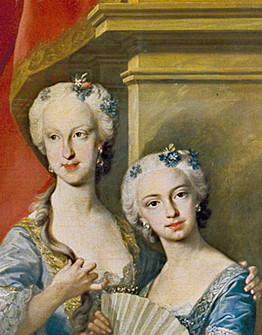
Maria Antonia (right) with her sister Maria Teresa

She was born at the Royal Alcázar of Seville in Seville and was the youngest daughter of Philip V of Spain and of his second wife Elisabeth Farnese. She was born in Seville during the signing of the Treaty of Seville which ended the Anglo-Spanish War. She spent her infancy in the city of her birth before moving to Madrid in 1733. She was baptised with the names María Antonia along with Fernanda in honour of her half brother, then the heir to the throne. Variations in her name range from "Antonia Fernanda" and "Antonietta Ferdinanda". As a daughter of the King of Spain, she held the title of Infanta of Spain and style of Royal Highness.

In a double marriage plan she would marry Louis, Dauphin of France, and her brother, Infante Philip, would marry the Dauphin's sister Louise Élisabeth of France. Her mother consented to the latter union, but insisted on waiting for Maria Antonia Ferdinanda to reach a more mature age. The Infanta's hand was also sought by the Electoral Prince of Saxony. The marriage between Infante Philip and Louise Élisabeth occurred in 1739 and eventually her older sister Infanta Maria Teresa Rafaela married the Dauphin in 1745. However, in 1746, two weeks after Philip V died, Maria Teresa Rafaela died giving birth to a daughter. Her half-brother Ferdinand VI, who had just taken the throne, tried to engage Maria Antonia Ferdinanda, his only half-sister that was still unmarried, to the Dauphin, but the idea was snubbed by Louis XV as "incest". Instead, he chose Polish princess Maria Josepha of Saxony, who was Maria Antonia's sister-in-law: her brother, the future Charles III, had married Maria Josepha's older sister, Maria Amalia.

=== Duchess of Savoy ===
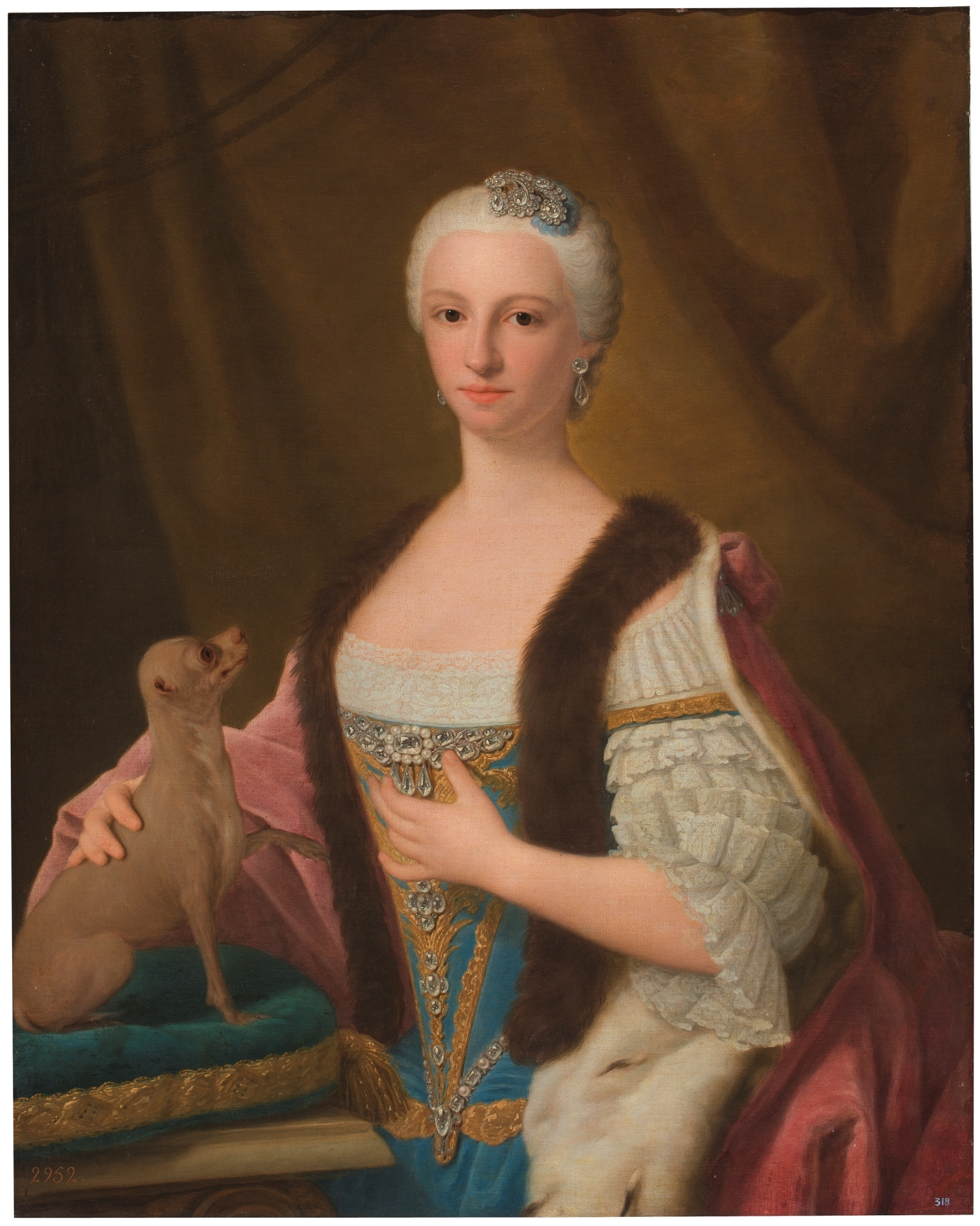
Portrait by Domenico Duprà, c. 1750

Having married by proxy in Madrid on 12 April 1750, she was married in person at Oulx on 31 May 1750 to Victor Amadeus, Duke of Savoy, the eldest son of Charles Emmanuel III of Sardinia and his late wife Polyxena of Hesse-Rotenburg. The marriage had been arranged by Maria Antonia Ferdinanda's half brother to strengthen relations between Madrid and Turin, as the two courts had fought on opposing sides during the War of the Austrian Succession, and Charles Emmanuel III was Ferdinand's uncle, as he was his mother's brother. The Treaty of Aix-la-Chapelle ended the war. As a wedding gift, the apartments of the new Duchess of Savoy at the Royal Palace of Turin were remodelled by the architect Benedetto Alfieri. Maria Antonia Ferdinanda was given a dowry of three-and-a-half million Piedmontese lires as well as Spanish possessions in Milan. In Italy she was known as Maria Antonietta Ferdinanda. Operas by Baldassare Galuppi were specially composed for her marriage to the Duke of Savoy.

The match was seen as unpopular, but the two remained close until her death. From marriage until her husband's accession she was styled as the Duchess of Savoy. The couple surrounded themselves with modern thinkers and various politicians. The first lady of the land, she brought a rigid etiquette from her native Spain to the court of Savoy. She was very religious and was said to have a cold, shy personality. She was the mother of twelve children, three of whom died in childhood. Two of her children had issue.

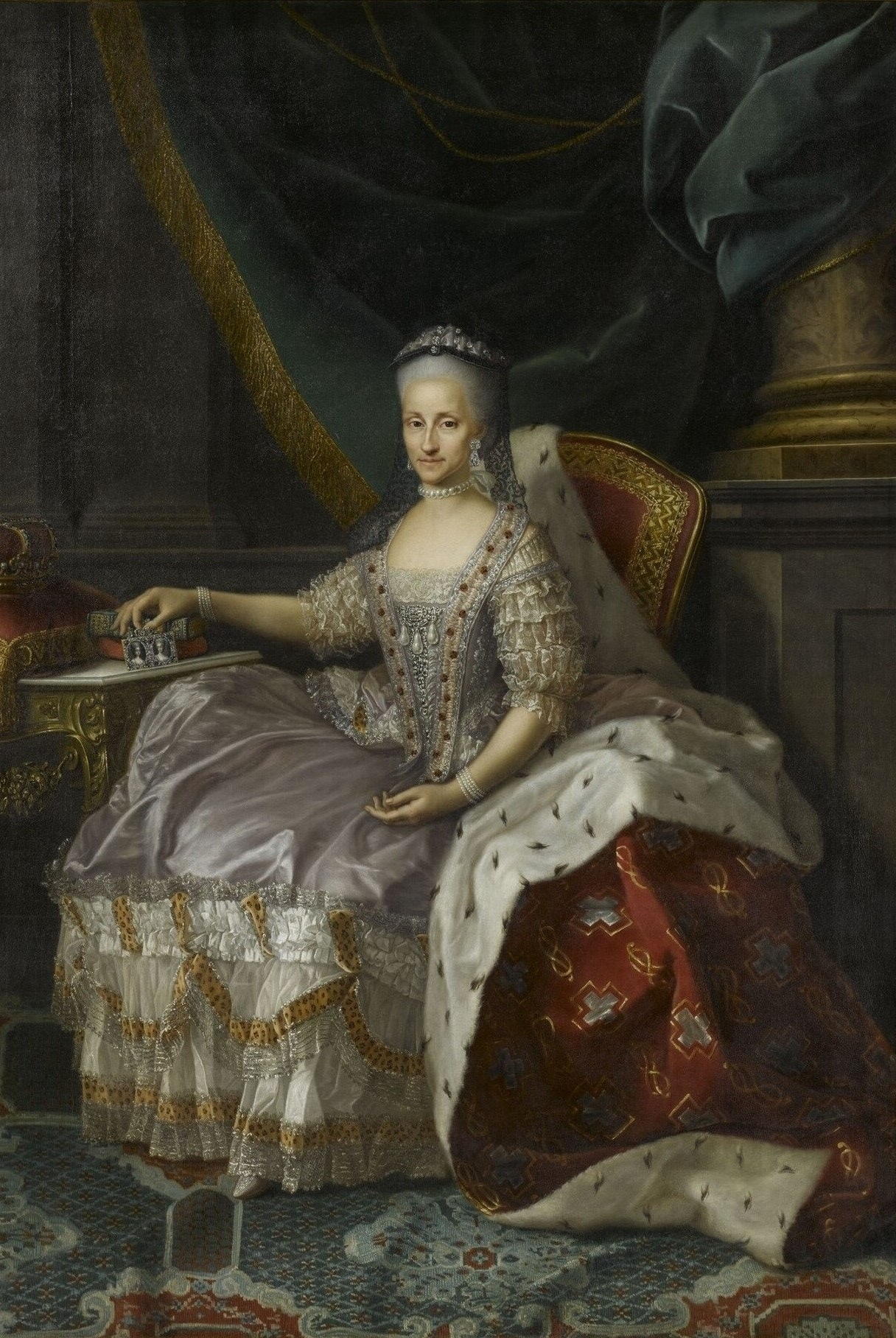
Portrait of Queen Maria Antoinetta by Anton Raphael Mengs. She is holding portrait miniatures of her daughters Marie Joséphine and Maria Theresa.

=== Queen of Sardinia ===
At the death of her father-in-law Charles Emmanuel III of Sardinia in 1773, her husband succeeded him as Victor Amadeus III. She was the first queen of Sardinia in over thirty years since the death of Elisabeth Therese of Lorraine in 1741.

Her oldest son Charles Emmanuel, Prince of Piedmont married Clotilde of France, sister of Louis XVI in 1775. Marie Clotilde and Maria Antonia Ferdinanda would become very close.

Queen Maria Antonia Ferdinanda died in September 1785 at the Castle of Moncalieri. She was buried at the Royal Basilica of Superga. Her husband outlived her by eleven years.

== Issue ==
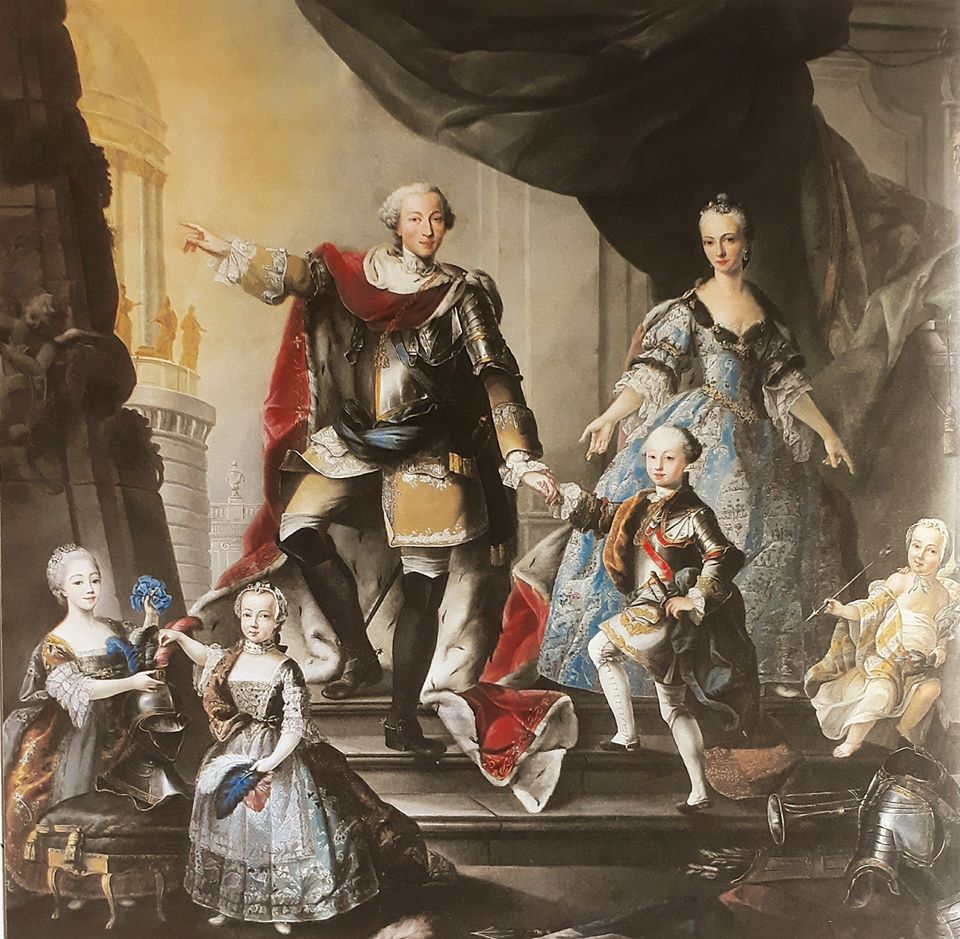
The Family of the King of Sardinia in 1760, Giuseppe Duprà

1. King Charles Emmanuel IV of Sardinia (24 May 1751 – 6 October 1819) married Princess Marie Clotilde of France in 1773, no issue.
2. Princess Maria Elisabetta Carlotta of Savoy (16 July 1752 – 17 April 1753) died in infancy.
3. Marie Joséphine of Savoy (2 September 1753 – 13 November 1810) married Louis XVIII, King of France in 1771, no issue.
4. Prince Amadeus Alexander of Savoy (5 October 1754 – 29 April 1755) died in infancy.
5. Princess Maria Theresa of Savoy (31 January 1756 – 2 June 1805) married Charles X, King of France in 1773, had issue.
6. Princess Maria Anna of Savoy (17 December 1757 – 11 October 1824) married her half-uncle Prince Benedetto of Savoy in 1775, no issue.
7. King Victor Emmanuel I of Sardinia(24 July 1759 – 10 January 1824) married Archduchess Maria Theresa of Austria-Este in 1789, had issue.
8. Maria Cristina Ferdinanda of Savoy (21 November 1760 – 19 May 1768), died in childhood.
9. Prince Maurizio of Savoy, Duke of Montferrat (13 December 1762 – 1 September 1799) died unmarried of malaria.
10. Princess Maria Carolina of Savoy (17 January 1764 – 28 December 1782) married Anthony, Electoral Prince of Saxony in 1781, no issue.
11. King Charles Felix of Sardinia (6 April 1765 – 27 April 1831) married Princess Maria Cristina of Naples and Sicily in 1807, no issue.
12. Prince Giuseppe of Savoy, Count of Asti (5 October 1766 – 29 October 1802) died unmarried of malaria.

Maria Antonia Ferdinanda of Spain House of Bourbon Cadet branch of the Capetian dynasty Born: 17 November 1729 Died: 17 September 1785
Italian royalty
Vacant Title last held by Elisabeth Therese of Lorraine	Queen consort of Sardinia; 20 February 1773 – 19 September 1785	Vacant Title next held by Marie Clotilde of France
