= Prince Giuseppe, Count of Asti =

Prince Giuseppe
- Count of Asti
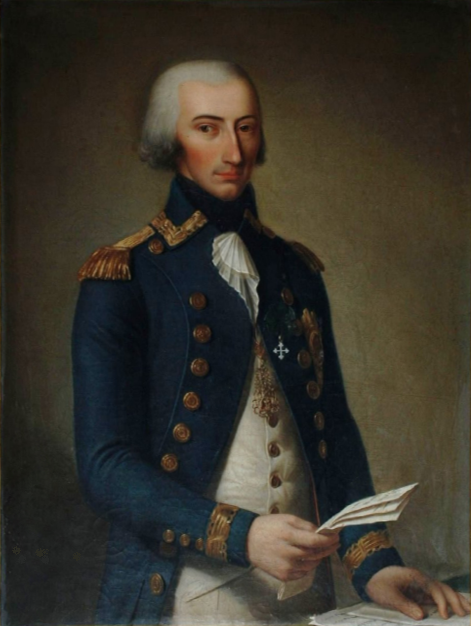
- Prince Giuseppe, Count of Asti.
- Born: 5 October 1766; Royal Palace of Turin, Turin
- Died: 29 October 1802 (aged 36); Palazzo Carcassona, Sardinia
- Burial: Cathedral of Alghero, Sardinia
Names
- Giuseppe Benedetto Maria Placido di Savoia
- House: House of Savoy
- Father: Victor Amadeus III
- Mother: Maria Antonia Ferdinanda of Spain

Giuseppe of Savoy (Giuseppe Benedetto Maria Placido; 5 October 1766 – 29 October 1802) was a prince of Savoy. He was styled the Count of Moriana from birth but was later created the Count of Asti.

== Biography ==
Prince Giuseppe born at the Royal Palace of Turin, he was styled the Count of Moriana from birth. He was the youngest child of Victor Amadeus of Savoy (then styled as the "Duke of Savoy") and his wife, Maria Antonia Ferdinanda of Spain. To escape the threat of Napoleon I, Montferrat fled to Sardinia with his brothers the Duke of Aosta and Duke of Genoa where the trio lived in the Palazzo Carcassona.

In June 1799 his brother Charles Emmanuel IV created his brother Maurice, the Governor of the province of Sassari but he later died of malaria on the island in 1799. At the death of Montferrat, Asti became governor of Sassari in his brother's place. Catching malaria in 1802, Asti died of the disease having had a fit of convulsions and was buried at the Cathedral of Alghero. His other brother Genoa later became the viceroy of Sardinia.

== Ancestry ==
Ancestors of Prince Giuseppe, Count of Asti

8. Victor Amadeus II of Sardinia
4. Charles Emmanuel III of Sardinia
9. Anne Marie of Orléans
2. Victor Amadeus III of Sardinia
10. Ernest Leopold, Landgrave of Hesse-Rotenburg
5. Polyxena of Hesse-Rotenburg
11. Eleonore of Löwenstein-Wertheim-Rochefort
1. Giuseppe of Savoy
12. Louis, Dauphin of France
6. Philip V of Spain
13. Maria Anna Victoria of Bavaria
3. Maria Antonia Ferdinanda of Spain
14. Odoardo Farnese, Hereditary Prince of Parma
7. Elisabeth Farnese
15. Dorothea Sophie of the Palatinate
