= Accademia di Agricoltura di Torino =

The Accademia di Agricoltura di Torino (academy of agriculture) of Turin was founded as the Società Agraria di Torino on 24 May 1785, by edict of Victor Amadeus III, King of Sardinia,

"to promote for the public advantage the cultivation of lands mainly in His Majesty's felicitous dominions in accordance with rules both appropriate and in keeping with their varied natures."

The organisation was later granted royal status, becoming the Reale Società Agraria, and today is known as the Accademia di Agricoltura di Torino (Turin Academy of Agriculture).

The impetus to establish the society came from the aristocratic landowners of Piedmont who provided its leadership. During this period they were anxious to embrace the results of scientific research into new and more productive farming methods in order to maximise the profitability of their estates. This they achieved through such means as developing the network of irrigation canals, extending the cultivation of rice, introducing new animal breeds, and establishing new business arrangements: sharecropping was replaced by large-scale leasing agreements.
