= Sardinian lira =

Currency of the Kingdom of Sardinia from 1816 to 1861

lira (Italian)
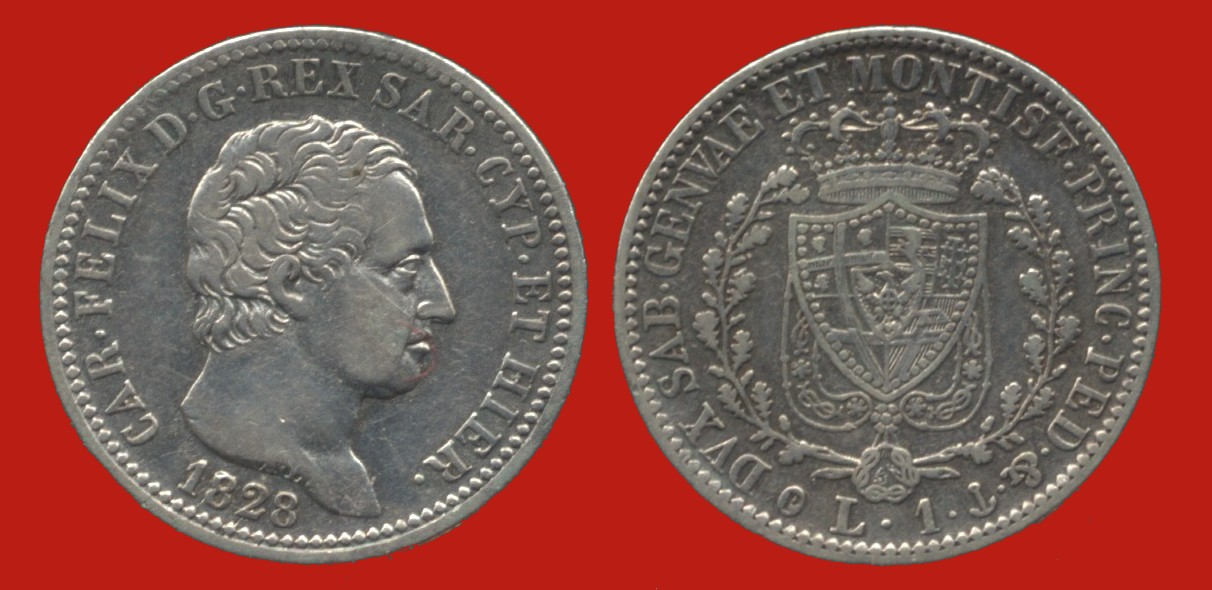
- £1 coin depicting Charles Felix

Unit
- Symbol: £
- Nickname: franc

Denominations
- Subunit
- 1/100: centesimo (c.)
- Coins: c.1, c.3, c.5 c.25, c.50, £1, £2, £5
- Rarely used: £10, £20, £40, £50, £80, £100

Demographics
- Official user(s): Savoy and Sardinia
- Unofficial users: Monaco, France, Parma, Andorra

Issuance
- Mint: Turin Mint, Genoa Mint, Milan Mint

Valuation
- Pegged by: French franc
- This infobox shows the latest status before this currency was rendered obsolete.

The lira (pl.: lire) was the currency of the Kingdom of Sardinia between August 6, 1816, and March 17, 1861.

== History ==
It was subdivided into 100 centesimi (singular centesimo) and was equal in value to the French franc (4.5 grams of silver), which had previously been used as the currency of the Kingdom of Sardinia, having replaced the Piedmontese scudo by 1801. Since the Sardinian lira was little more than another version of the French franc, it could circulate also in France, and the French coins could circulate in Piedmont (the mainland part of the Kingdom of Sardinia). The Sardinian lira was replaced at par by the Italian lira in 1861, as a consequence of the process of Italian unification. Similar to the majority of 19th century currencies, the Sardinian lira was not affected by significant episodes of inflation during all its existence.

== Coins ==
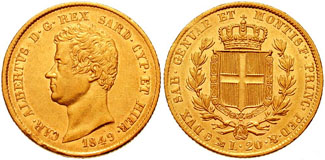
£20 coin depicting Charles Albert

In 1816, King Victor Emmanuel I issued silver £5 and gold £20 coins. Before his abdication in 1821, he also issued a new gold £80 coin.

King Charles Felix followed in 1821 and 1822 minting gold £40 and £80, respectively. He also expanded the new currency in Sardinia which, not having been conquered by Napoleon, had retained its Sardinian scudo. Silver c.50, £1 and £2 were added in 1823, followed by copper c.1, c.3 and c.5 in 1826, and silver c.25 in 1829.

Finally, King Charles Albert added new gold £10, £50 and £100 in 1832, while King Victor Emmanuel II continued his father's coinage.

On each coin, the ruling monarch was styled in Latin as King of Sardinia, Cyprus and Jerusalem by the Grace of God on the front side, and Duke of Savoy, Genoa and Montferrat, Prince of Piedmont et cetera on the back side.

== See also ==
- Latin Monetary Union
- History of coins in Italy
