= Moncalieri Castle =

Castle of Moncalieri
- Castello di Moncalieri
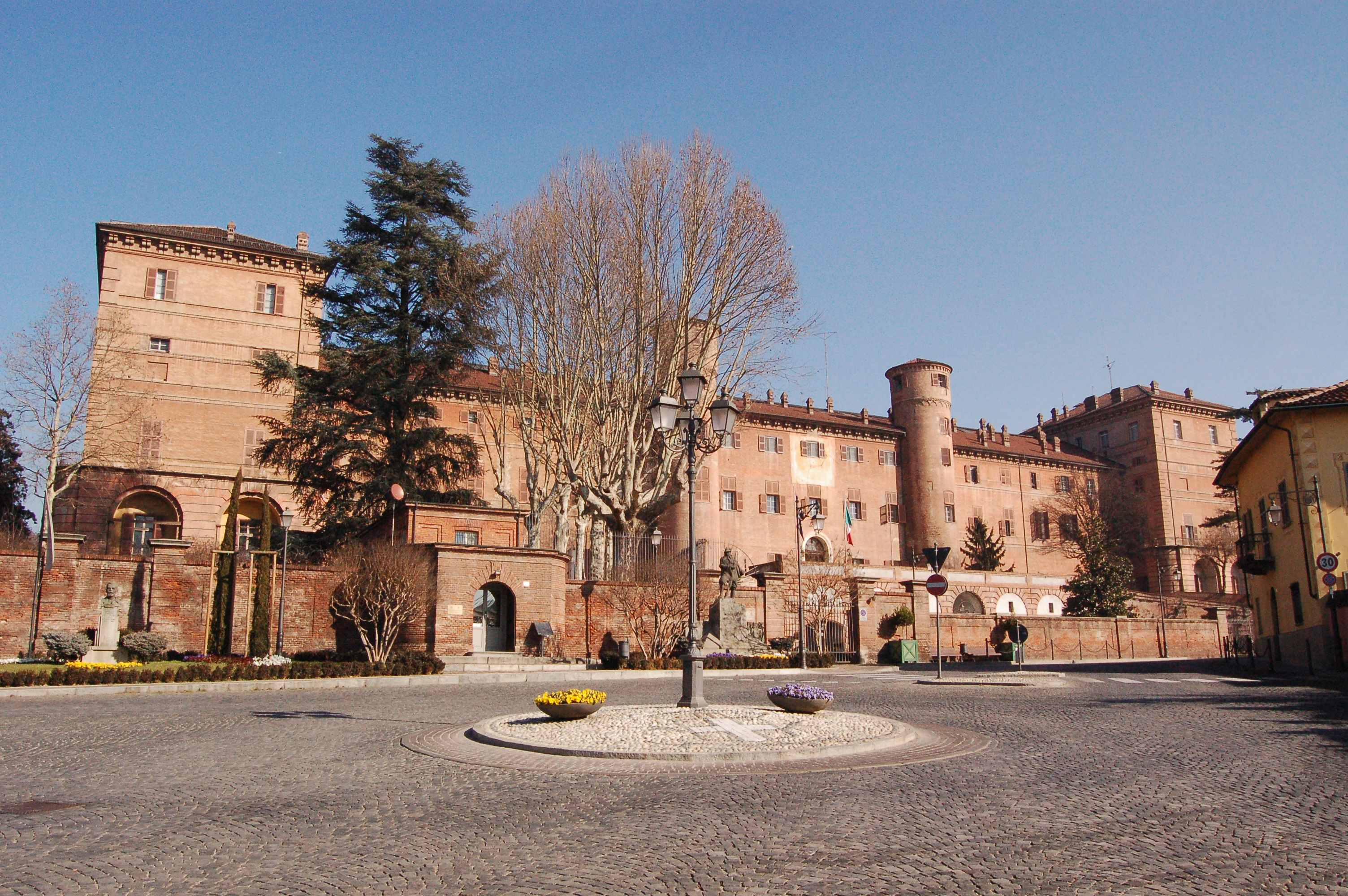

- Location within Piedmont Location within Italy

General information
- Location: Moncalieri, Italy
- Coordinates: 45°00′08.1″N 7°41′12.5″E

UNESCO World Heritage Site
- Criteria: Architectural: C (i) (ii) (iv) (v)
- Reference: 823bis
- Inscription: 1997 (21st Session)

The Castle of Moncalieri (Italian: Castello di Moncalieri) is a palace in Moncalieri (Metropolitan City of Turin), Piedmont, in northern Italy. It is one of the Residences of the Royal House of Savoy listed by UNESCO as World Heritage Sites in 1997.

== History ==
The first structure was a fortress built by Thomas I of Savoy around 1100 on a hill, to command the main southern access to Turin. In the mid-15th century Yolanda of Valois, wife of Duke Amadeus IX, turned it into a pleasure residence. Architect Carlo di Castellamonte enlarged the construction substantially, and the interiors were redesigned by him and other local artists.

The castle was the site of the marriage between Maria Vittoria Francesca of Savoy to the Prince of Carignano. It was also the place where Maria Carolina of Savoy married Anthony of Saxony by proxy in 1781.

It was the scene of the death of Maria Antonietta of Spain in 1785; she was the wife of Victor Amadeus III of Sardinia. Victor Amadeus later died there in 1796.

The castle was used extensively by the Savoyards, and was the first castle occupied in 1798 by the French army, who retained it until 1814. Returned to Victor Emmanuel I and later to his distant nephew Charles Albert of Sardinia, Prince of Carignano, it became the residence of young family princes who studied here. King Victor Emmanuel II preferred it to the Royal Palace of Turin, and had numerous apartments furnished according to his tastes. In 1849, it was from this palace that emerged the famous Proclamation of Moncalieri, written by Massimo d'Azeglio and signed by the King.

The palace was later used by the queen mothers and royal princesses. Since 1921 it has been the home of the 1st Battalion of the Carabinieri, but the historical rooms can be freely visited.

On April 5, 2008, a fire broke out in the castle, damaging one of the towers and the hall of the proclaim.

== Overview ==
The current structure of the castle is in the shape of a horseshoe facing south, with four massive square towers at each angle. The side sections have five floors, brick walls and robust buttresses. Two other minor buildings parallel the side sections and create two courts. The southern façade has a giardino all'italiana and two small cylindrical towers, last remains of the 15th-century castle. The northern entrance has also a notable belvedere.
