= Alghero Cathedral =

Cathedral in Alghero, Italy

Coordinates: 40.5592°N 8.31278°E

Location of Alghero Cathedral

Alghero Cathedral, otherwise the Cathedral of St. Mary the Immaculate (Italian: Duomo di Alghero; Cattedrale di Santa Maria Immacolata Catalan: Catedral de l'Alguer; Catedral de Santa Maria Immaculada), is a Roman Catholic cathedral in Alghero in the province of Sassari, Sardinia, Italy. It is located in the historic center of the city. It was the seat of the Bishop of Alghero from 1503 to 1986, and since 1986 has been that of the Bishop of Alghero-Bosa.

== History ==
Alghero was designated as a diocesan seat in 1503 but construction work on the cathedral did not begin until 1567. It was inaugurated in 1593 but was not finished. After several restorations it was consecrated in 1730.

The church was originally in Catalan-Gothic style, as can be seen in the five chapels and ambulatory of the presbytery, which also includes the octagonal base of the bell tower. The nave and the two aisles are however in Late Renaissance style. The main altar was designed by the Genovese artist Giuseppe Massetti (1727): the sculpture shows Mary the Immaculate flanked by angels. He also designed the ambulatory and the pulpit. In 1862 a Neo-Classical narthex was added to the façade, which dramatically changed its appearance.

The first chapel on the right side is dedicated to the Blessed Sacrament. Its imposing, marble altar was inaugurated in 1824. It is located inside a circular temple, reminding the Temple of Vesta in Rome.

The cathedral is the burial site of the Italian-born Duke of Montferrat (1762-1799) and his brother Count of Asti (1766-1802) who died on the island having caught malaria. The marble mausoleum was sculpted by Felice Festa in the early 19th century.

== Gallery ==
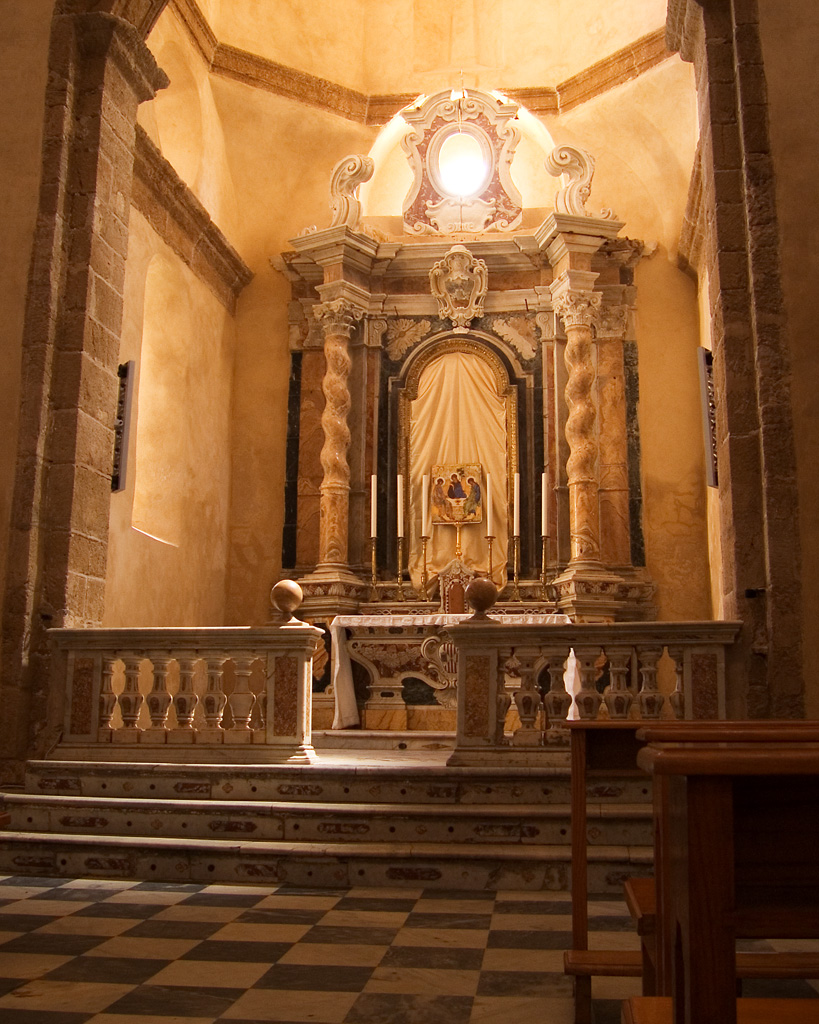
Altar

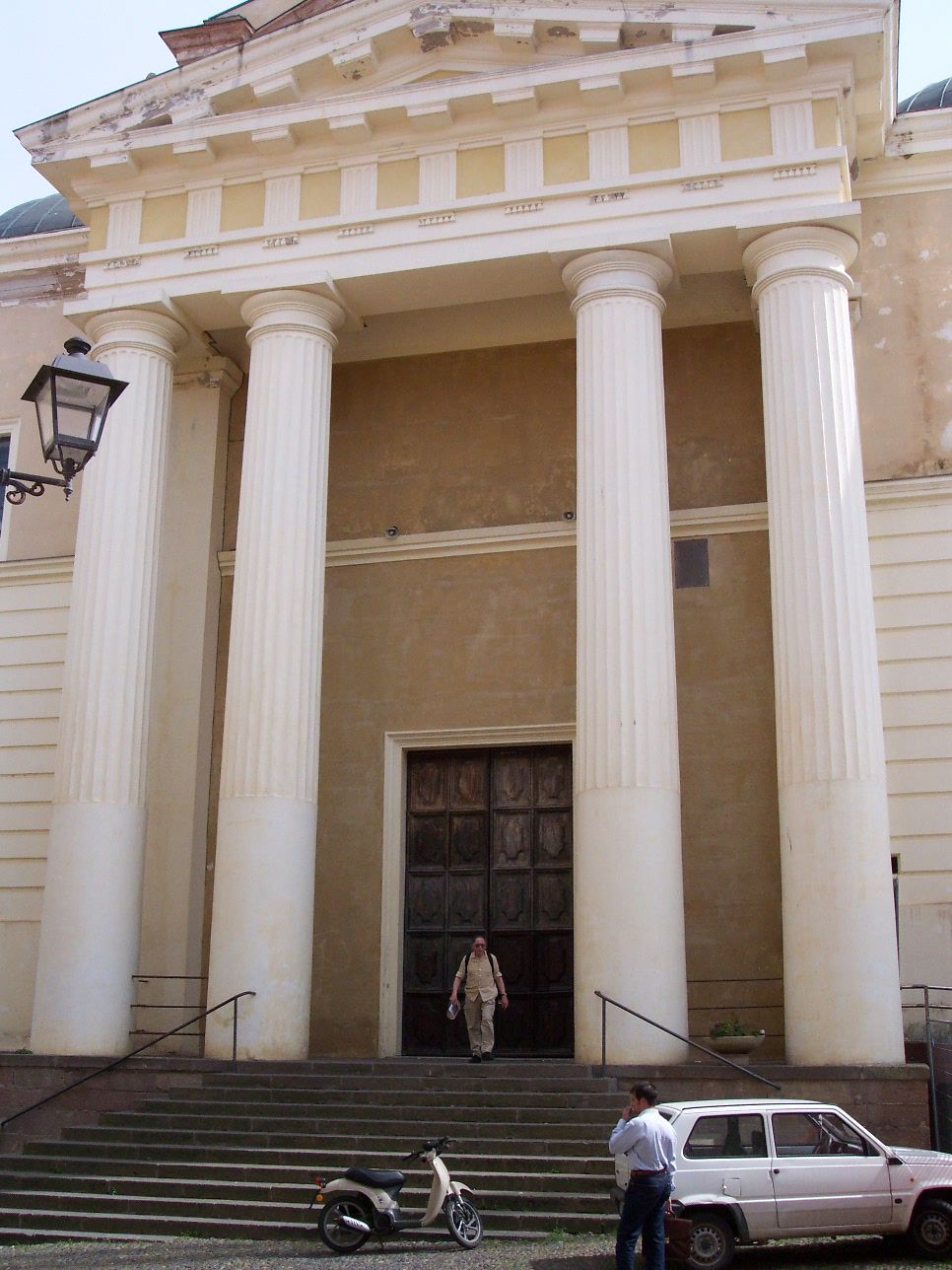
Alghero Cathedral: 19th century Neo-Classical addition to west front

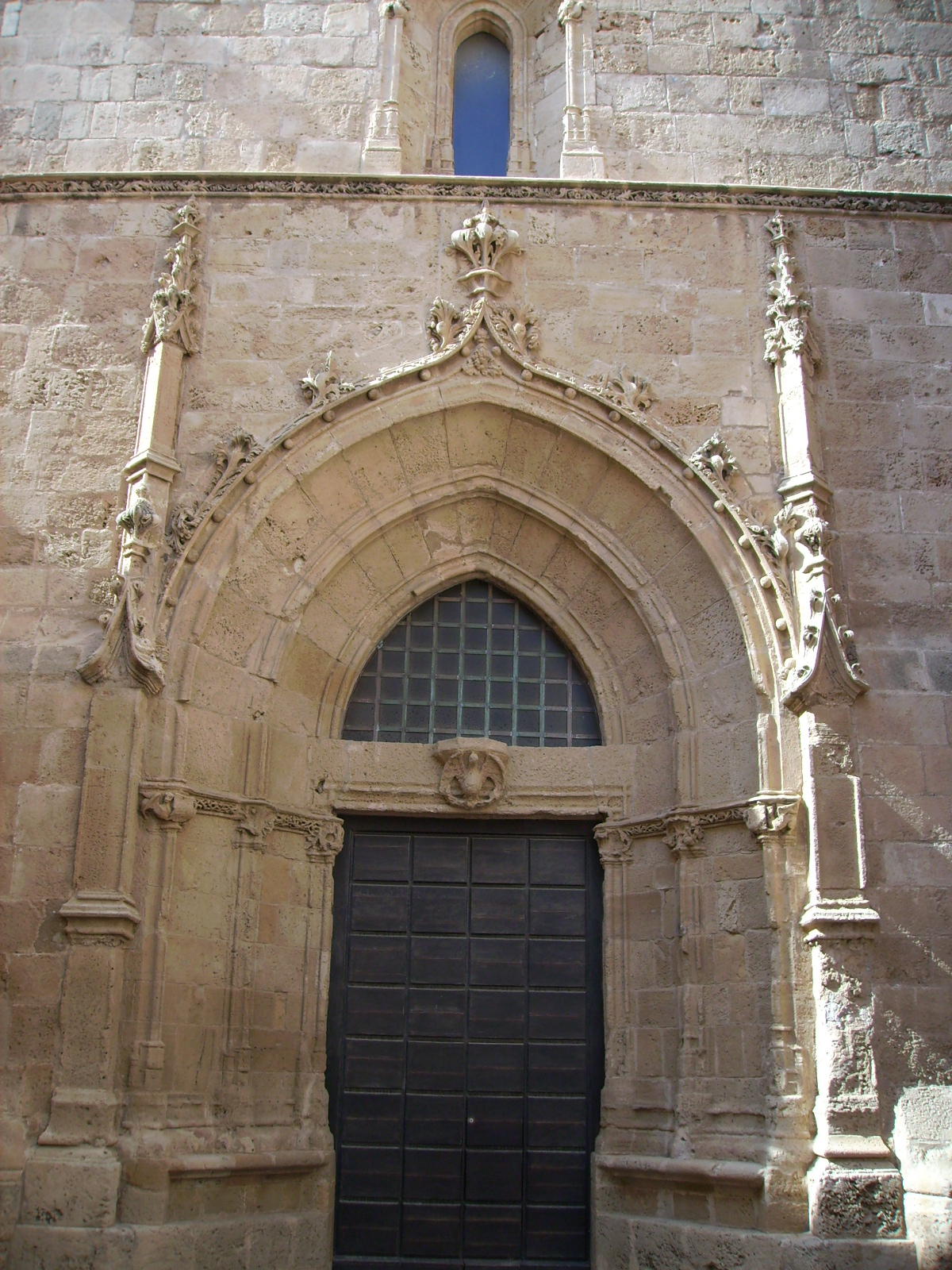
Original Gothic portal

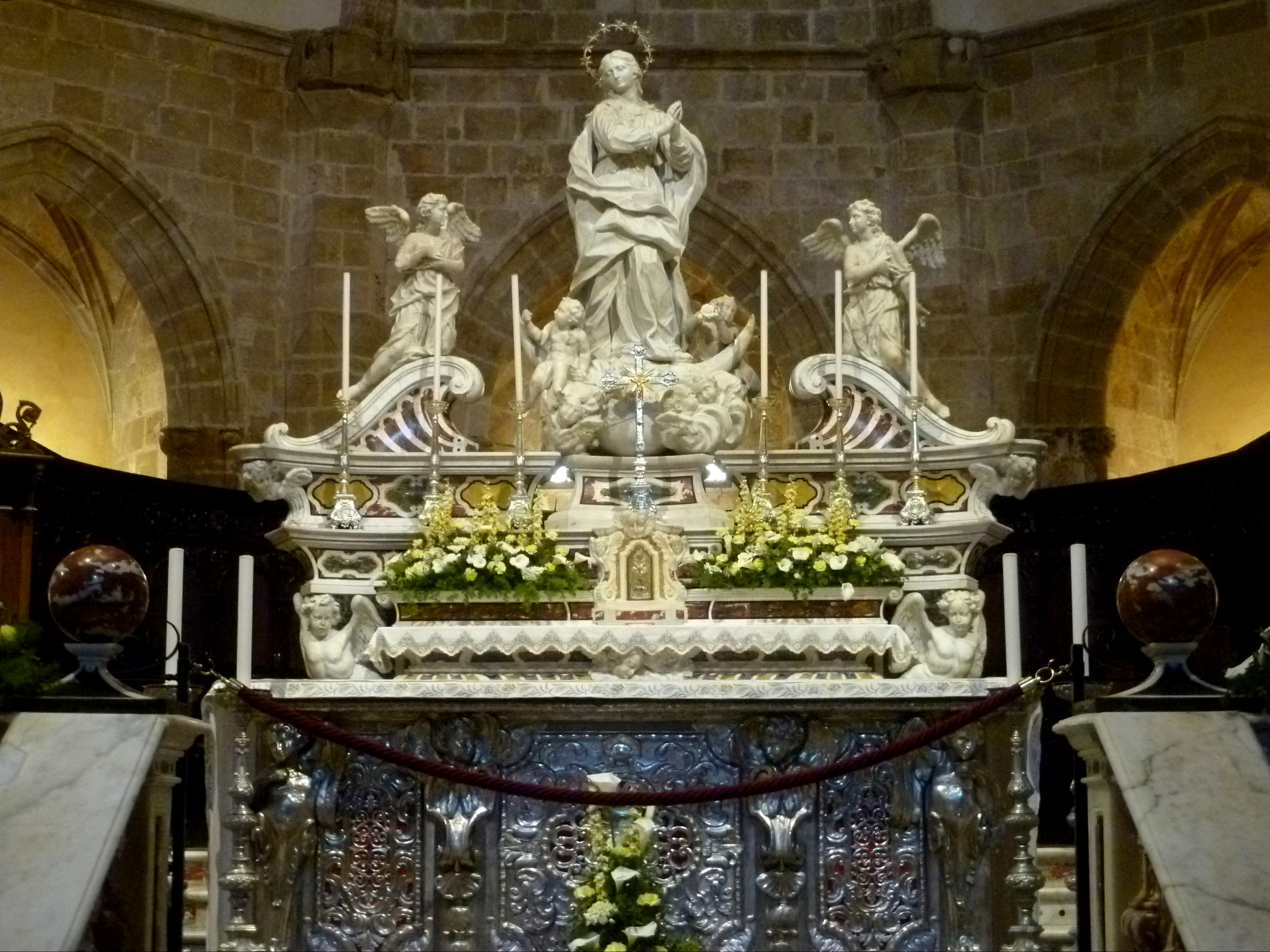
Main altar by Giuseppe Massetti

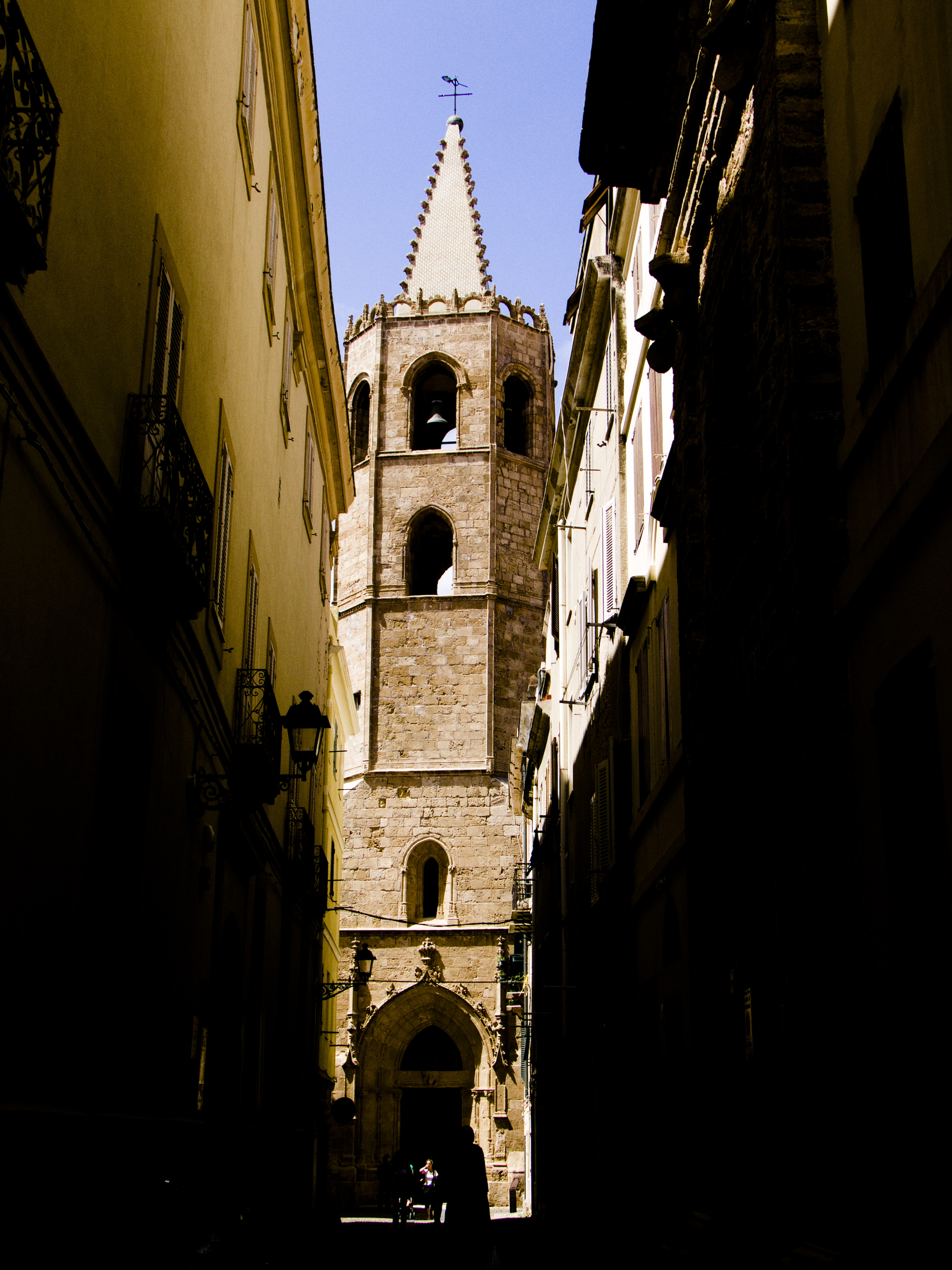
Alghero Cathedral Catalan Gothic

== Sources ==
- Francesca Segni Pulvirenti, Aldo Sari. Architettura tardogotica e d'influsso rinascimentale. Nuoro, Ilisso, 1994. ISBN 88-85098-31-2
- Salvatore Naitza. Architettura dal tardo '600 al classicismo purista. Nuoro, Ilisso, 1992. ISBN 88-85098-20-7
- Maria Grazia Scano. Pittura e scultura dell'Ottocento. Nuoro, Ilisso, 1997. ISBN 88-85098-56-8

=== External links ===
- Catholic Encyclopedia: Alghero
- Catholic Hierarchy: Diocese of Alghero-Bosa
- Website of Diocese of Alghero-Bosa (in Italian)
