= Charles Emmanuel IV =

King of Sardinia from 1796 to 1802

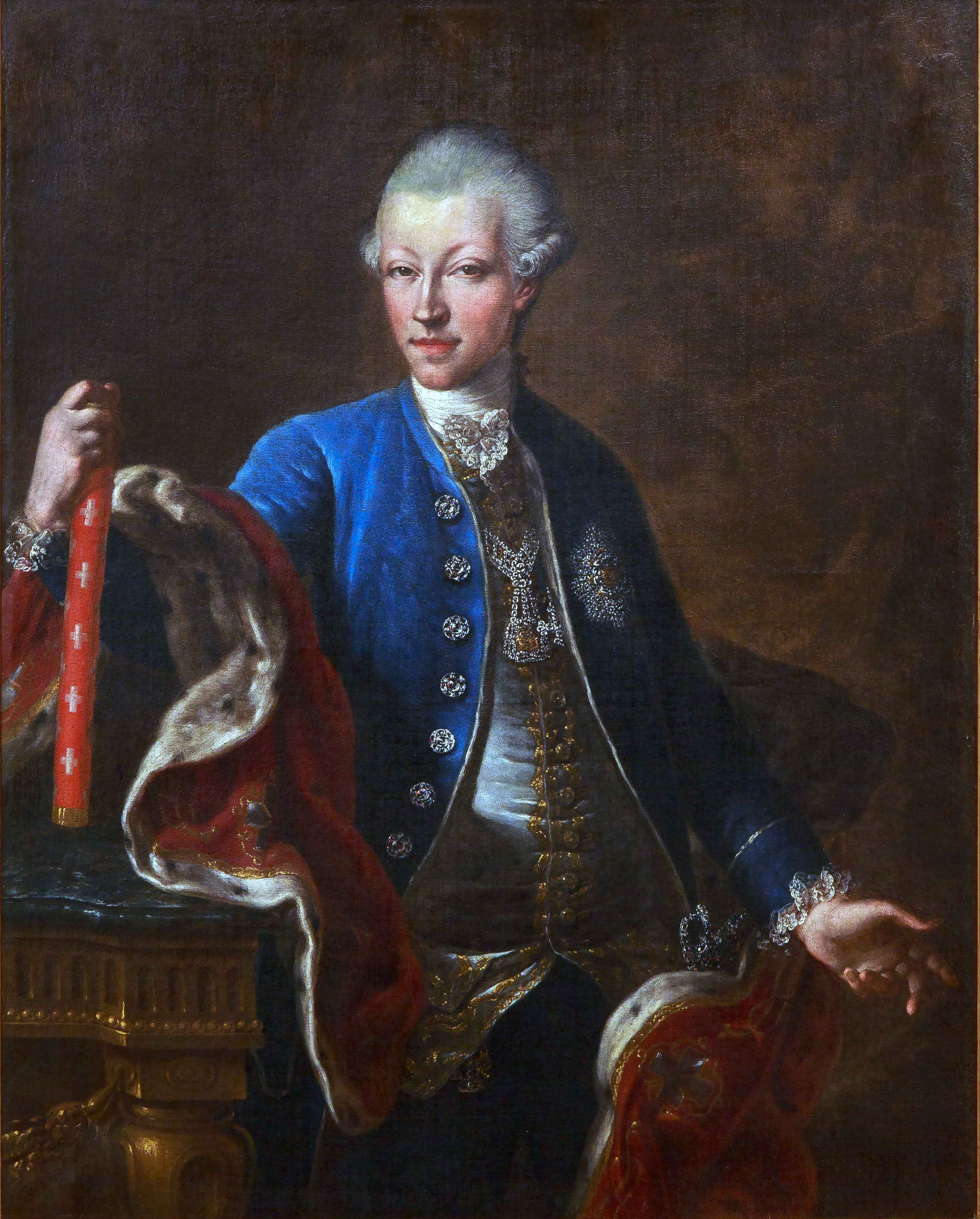
- Portrait attributed to Giovanni Panealbo, 1796–1799

King of Sardinia Duke of Savoy
- Reign: 16 October 1796 – 4 June 1802
- Predecessor: Victor Amadeus III
- Successor: Victor Emmanuel I
- Born: 24 May 1751; Royal Palace of Turin, Turin, Kingdom of Sardinia
- Died: 6 October 1819 (aged 68); Palazzo Colonna, Rome, States of the Church
- Burial: Church of Sant'Andrea al Quirinale
- Spouse: Marie Clotilde of France (m. 1775; died 1802)
Names
- Italian: Carlo Emanuele Ferdinando Maria di Savoia
- House: Savoy
- Father: Victor Amadeus III
- Mother: Maria Antonia Ferdinanda of Spain
- Religion: Catholic Church

Charles Emmanuel IV (Carlo Emanuele Ferdinando Maria; 24 May 1751 – 6 October 1819) was King of Sardinia and ruler of the Savoyard states from 16 October 1796 until 1802, when he abdicated in favour of his brother Victor Emmanuel I.

== Early life ==
Charles Emmanuel was born in Turin, the eldest son of Victor Amadeus III, the future King of Sardinia, and of his wife Infanta Maria Antonia Ferdinanda of Spain. From his birth to his succession to the throne of Sardinia in 1796, Charles Emmanuel was styled "Prince of Piedmont".

In 1773, Victor Amadeus III became king of Sardinia and began to organise a political marriage for his son. Two of Charles Emmanuel's sisters were married to younger brothers of king Louis XVI of France: Marie Joséphine to the count of Provence, who was later king Louis XVIII, and Maria Theresa to the count of Artois, who was later king Charles X. On 21 August 1775, after two years of negotiations, Charles Emmanuel was engaged to Clotilde of France, a sister of Louis XVI. The wedding took place on 6 September 1775 at Chambéry. Although the union was arranged for political reasons, Charles Emmanuel and his wife became devoted to each other. They shared a very strict and sober Catholic faith. Their attempts to have children, however, were unsuccessful.

Charles Emmanuel was profoundly affected by the French Revolution, which saw his brother-in-law Louis XVI and his wife Marie Antoinette executed in 1793. From 1794, troops of the French First Republic raided the Savoyard domains. Charles Emmanuel sought solace in his faith and became a member of the Third Order of Saint Dominic in 1794.

== Reign ==
At the death of his father on 16 October 1796 Charles Emmanuel succeeded as King of Sardinia. The kingdom included not only the island of Sardinia but also significant territories in northwest Italy including all of Piedmont.

In March 1796, Sardinia had been forced to conclude the disadvantageous Treaty of Paris (1796) with the French Republic, giving the French army free passage through Piedmont. On 4 April 1797, Charles Emmanuel decided to make a preliminary deal with France under which he would renounce control of Sardinia in exchange for an equivalent territory in Italy. The treasury of the kingdom was empty, the army was disabled and disorganised, and revolutionary feeling was strong among the populace. Between 1796 and 1798, two conspiracies against the monarchy were foiled and the conspirators condemned to death. On 6 December 1798 the French, under Joubert, occupied Turin and forced Charles Emanuel to abdicate all his territories on the Italian mainland and restrict his realm to the island of Sardinia, which stayed out of the reach of the French army. After this, Piedmont became a French military region. Charles Emmanuel and his wife left Turin for Parma and then Florence. In February 1799, security concerns forced Charles Emmanuel to retire to Sardinia. The following month, the French occupied Florence and expelled the Grand-Duke of Tuscany from his domains.

In Sardinia, Charles Emmanuel issued a formal protest against the confiscation of his mainland territories, announced numerous reforms for the island, and closed his ports to the English fleet. In the meanwhile, the Russian army had liberated Turin from the French. At the invitation of tsar Paul I of Russia, who had instructed General Suvorov to send count Alessandro de Rege di Gifflenga to Sardinia to restore the Sardinian throne, Charles Emmanuel decided to leave the island and return to the mainland. When he disembarked at Livorno with his wife on 22 September 1799, he discovered that the Russian army had left Piedmont in Austrian hands and that the latter were not inclined to support his restoration. He then decided to establish himself at the Villa del Poggio Imperiale near Florence, where he met with one of his subjects, Vittorio Alfieri.

Between 1800 and 1802, Charles Emmanuel and his wife stayed at Rome, Frascati, Naples, and Caserta.

== Post-abdication ==
On 7 March 1802, Charles Emmanuel's wife, Clotilde of France, died, he was so moved by her death that he decided to abdicate, on 4 June 1802, in favour of his brother Victor Emmanuel I. Charles Emmanuel retained the personal title of king. He lived in Rome and in the nearby town of Frascati.

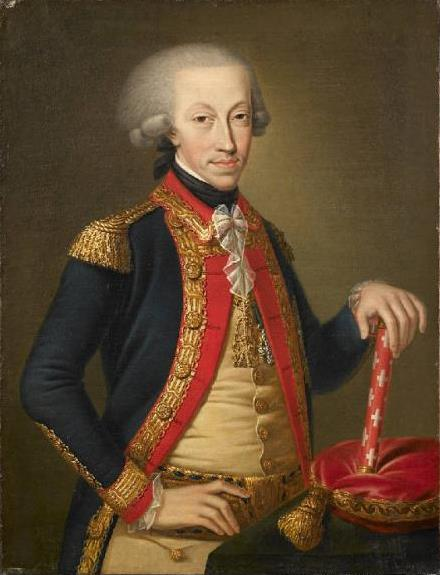
c. 1796 portrait of Charles Emmanuel IV

In Frascati he was a frequent guest of his cousin Henry Benedict Stuart, Cardinal Duke of York, last member of the royal House of Stuart. Charles was descended from Henrietta Anne Stuart, the youngest daughter of King Charles I of England, whereas Henry Benedict Stuart was descended from Henrietta Anne's brother James II. When Henry died in 1807, Charles Emmanuel became the heir-general of Charles I, and thus inherited the Jacobite claim to the British thrones. Unlike his three predecessors, however, neither he nor his successors ever made any attempt to claim the throne.

In 1815, at the age of sixty-four, Charles Emmanuel took simple vows in the Society of Jesus (the Jesuits). He was never ordained to the priesthood but lived the rest of his life at the Jesuit novitiate in Rome.

Charles Emmanuel died at the Palazzo Colonna in Rome on 6 October 1819. He is buried in the Church of Sant'Andrea al Quirinale.

Charles Emmanuel IV House of Savoy Born: 24 May 1751 Died: 6 October 1819
Regnal titles
Preceded by Victor Amadeus III	King of Sardinia; 1796–1802	Succeeded by Victor Emmanuel I
Titles in pretence
Preceded by Henry Benedict Stuart	— TITULAR — King of England, Scotland, and Ireland; 1807–1819	Succeeded by Victor Emmanuel I
