= List of Sardinian monarchs =

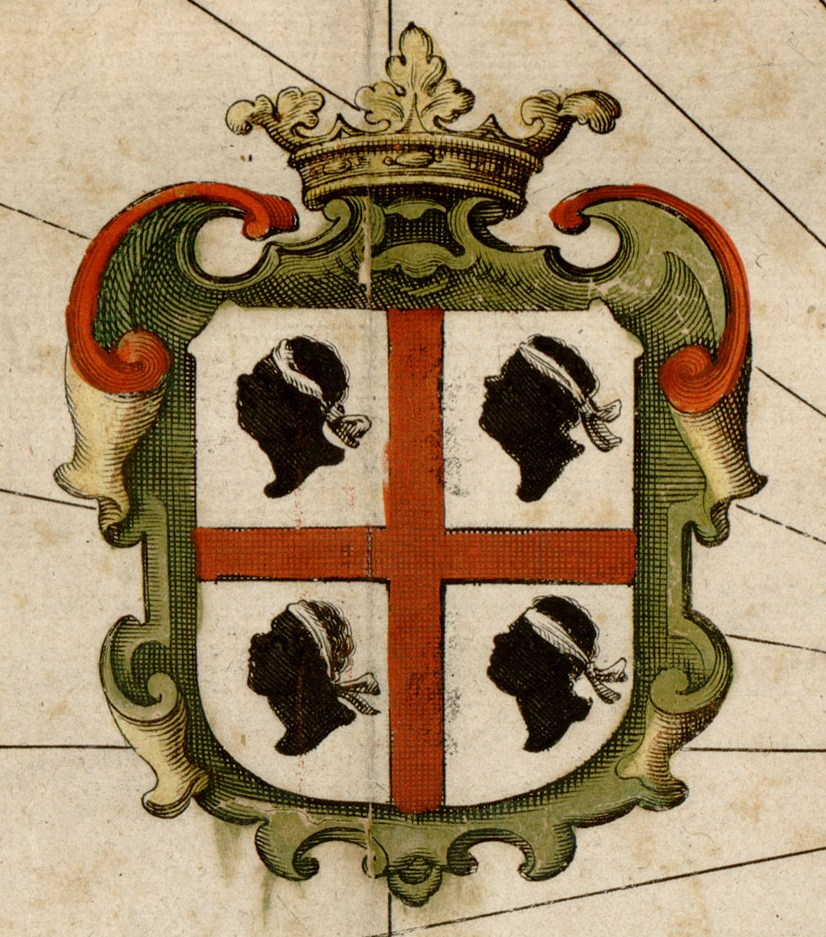
Coat of arms of the Kingdom of Sardinia from the 14th century

Sardinia is traditionally known to have been initially ruled by the Nuragic civilization, which was followed by Greek colonization, conquest by the Carthaginians, and occupied by the Romans for around a thousand years, including the rule of the Vandals in the 5th and 6th centuries AD. Before the foundation of the Kingdom of Sardinia, Sardinia was ruled by judices, and some rulers obtained the title of King of Sardinia by the Holy Roman Emperor but did not gain effective authority to rule it.

The title of as Rex Sardiniae et Corsicae (King of Sardinia and Corsica) was first established in 1297, when Pope Boniface VIII gave a royal investiture to James II of Aragon. The Crown of Aragon started effectively ruling Sardinia in 1323. Until 1479, when Ferdinand II of Aragon acknowledged Corsica as part of the Republic of Genoa, rulers of Sardinia used the nominal title of Rex Corsicae (King of Corsica). Corsica had been effectively ruled by Genoa since 1284 and the Kingdom of Sardinia and Corsica had been renamed simply Kingdom of Sardinia in 1460, when it was incorporated into a sort of confederation of states, each with its own institutions, called the Crown of Aragon, and united only in the person of the king.

Monarchs of the Kingdom of Sardinia and Corsica from 1323 and then of the Kingdom of Sardinia from 1479 to 1861 included the House of Barcelona (1323–1410) and the House of Trastámara (1412–1516), the Spanish branch of the House of Habsburg (1516–1700) and the House of Bourbon (1700–1708), and the Austrian branch of the House of Habsburg (1708–1720). In 1720, the Kingdom of Sardinia was ceded to the House of Savoy, which ruled Sardinia–Piedmont until 1861, when it changed its name to the Kingdom of Italy (1861–1946). During its existence from 1297 to 1861, 24 sovereigns from seven different dynasties succeeded one another on the throne of the kingdom.

== Early history ==
Owing to the absence of written sources, little is known of the history of the Nuraghic civilization, which constructed impressive megalithic structures between the 18th and the 12th centuries BCE. The first accounts of Sardinia are from Greek sources but relate more to myth than to historical reality. An African or Iberian hero, Norax, named the city of Nora; Sardus, a son of Hercules, gave the island its name; and one of his nephews, Iolaus, founded the city of Olbia. Greek colonization of the city of Olbia has been confirmed by recent archaeological excavations. Towards the end of the 6th century BC, Sardinia was conquered by the Carthaginians and in 238 BC it was occupied by the Romans for c. 1,000 years, with a period under the dominion of the Vandals in the 5th and 6th centuries CE.

== Early medieval rulers ==
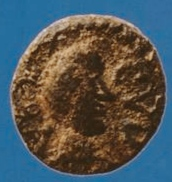
Vandal coin found in Sardinia depicting Godas (inscribed REX CVDA)

- Godas (Died 533)

According to Procopius, Godas was a Vandal governor of Sardinia who rebelled against his king, Gelimer, who ruled northern Africa, Sardinia and Corsica. Procopius wrote that Godas behaved like a king but that it was a short-lived kingdom. Godas was defeated and killed in 533 by an expedition from Carthage led by Gelimer's brother, Tzazo. Shortly afterwards, Roman troops sent by Byzantine emperor Justinian I and led by his general Belisarius totally annihilated the Vandal kingdom and Sardinia returned to Roman administration.

== Judges ==
Before the Kingdom of Sardinia was founded, the rulers of the island were known as archons (ἄρχοντες in Greek) or "judges" (iudices in Latin, judices in Sardinian, giudici in Italian). The island was organized into one "judicatus" from the 9th century. After the Muslim conquest of Sicily in the 9th century, the Byzantines (who ruled Sardinia) could no longer defend their isolated far western province. In all likelihood a local noble family came to power, still identifying themselves as vassals of the Byzantines but in reality independent since communication with Constantinople was very difficult. Of those rulers, only two names are known: Salusios (Σαλούσιος) and the protospatharios Turcoturios (Tουρκοτούριος), who probably reigned some time in the 10th and 11th centuries. They were still closely linked to the Byzantines, both by a pact of ancient vassalage and culturally, with the use of the Greek language (in a country of the Romance language) and Byzantine art. In the early 11th century, Muslims based in Spain attempted to conquer the island. The only records of that war are from Pisan and Genoese chronicles. The Christians won but afterwards the previous Sardinian kingdom had been undermined and was divided into four small judicati: Cagliari (Calari), Arborea (Arbaree), Gallura, Torres or Logudoro.

- List of judges of Arborea, c. 1070–1410
- List of judges of Cagliari, c. 1060–1258
- List of judges of Gallura, c. 1070–1288
- List of judges of Logudoro, c. 1060–1259

Occasionally, these rulers took the style of king (rex):

- 1113–1128 Constantine I, Judge of Torres
- 1128–1150 Gonario II, Judge of Torres

== Nominal kings ==
Some rulers obtained the title King of Sardinia (Rex Sardiniae) by grant of the Holy Roman Emperor, despite the emperor itself not having any sovereignty over the island, which made this a mere title with no effective authority over Sardinia:

- Barisone II of Arborea, who was the crowned King of Sardinia (1164–1165) by Emperor Frederick I but officially renounced his title in a peace treaty with the other judices in 1172.
- Enzo of Sardinia from the Hohenstaufen (1238–1245), who was the illegitimate son of Emperor Frederick II and was appointed by his father as King of Sardinia (1238–1245). In 1249, he was captured by his enemies and imprisoned in Bologna, where he died 23 years later.
- Philip of Sicily, second son of Charles I of Anjou and his first wife Beatrice, was elected king of Sardinia by the local Guelphs in 1269, but without the pope's consent. He died childless in 1278.

== Kings of Sardinia and Corsica ==
In 1297, James II of Aragon received royal investiture from Pope Boniface VIII and obtained the title King of Sardinia and Corsica (Rex Sardiniae et Corsicae); however, the Aragonese did not take possession of the island until 1323, after a victorious military campaign against the Pisans. The Sardinian royal title did not have a specific line of succession and all kings used their own primary title. The kingdom was initially called Regnum Sardiniae et Corsicae (Kingdom of Sardinia and Corsica), changed in 1460 to Regnum Sardiniae (Kingdom of Sardinia), in that it was originally meant to also include the neighbouring island of Corsica, which had been effectively ruled by Genoa since 1284 until its status as a Genoese land was eventually acknowledged by Ferdinand II of Aragon, who dropped the last original bit mentioning Corsica in 1479; since then, the coinage minted since the establishment of the kingdom also bore the reference to Sardinia only. From 1297 until 1861, there were 24 kings through seven dynasties that ruled Sardinia.

=== House of Barcelona (Aragon), 1323–1410 ===
Name	Portrait	Birth	Marriage(s)	Death
James II of Aragon; 1323–1327	James I	10 August 1267; Valencia son of Peter I and Constance of Sicily	Isabella of Castile; 1 December 1291; No children Blanche of Anjou; 29 October 1295; 10 children Marie de Lusignan; 15 June 1315; No children Elisenda de Montcada; 25 December 1322; No children	5 November 1327; Barcelona aged 60
Alfonso IV of Aragon; 1327–1336	Alfonso I	1299; Naples son of James II of Aragon and Blanche of Anjou	Teresa d'Entença; 1314; 7 children Eleanor of Castile; 2 children	27 January 1336; Barcelona aged 37
Peter IV of Aragon; 1336–1387	Peter	5 October 1319; Balaguer son of Alfonso IV and Teresa d'Entença	Maria of Navarre; 1338; 2 children Leonor of Portugal; 1347; No children Eleanor of Sicily; 27 August 1349; 4 children	5 January 1387; Barcelona aged 68
John I of Aragon; 1387–1396	Peter IV	27 December 1350; Perpignan son of Peter IV of Aragon and Eleanor of Sicily	Martha of Armagnac; 27 March 1373; 1 child Yolande of Bar; 1380; 3 children	19 May 1396; Foixà aged 46
Martin of Aragon; 1396–1410	Martin I	1356; Girona son of Peter IV of Aragon and Eleanor of Sicily	Maria de Luna; 13 June 1372; 4 children Margarita of Aragon-Prades; 17 September 1409; No children	31 May 1410; Barcelona aged 54

==== Coat of arms ====
Arms of the House of Barcelona

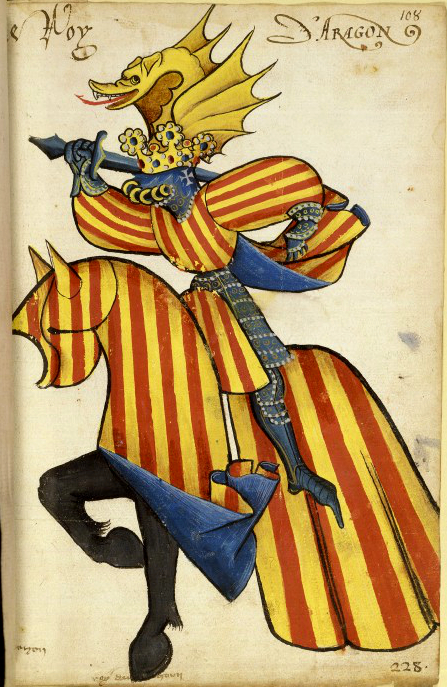
The king of Aragon in Le grand armorial équestre de la Toison d'or

=== House of Trastámara, 1412–1516 ===
Name	Portrait	Birth	Marriage(s)	Death
Ferdinand I of Aragon; 1412–1416	Ferdinand I	27 November 1380; Medina del Campo son of John I of Castile and Eleanor of Aragon	Eleanor of Alburquerque; 1394; 8 children	2 April 1416; Igualada aged 36
Alfonso V of Aragon; 1416–1458	Alfonso V	1396; Medina del Campo son of Ferdinand I and Eleanor of Alburquerque	Maria of Castile; 1415; No children	27 June 1458; Naples aged 52

==== Coat of arms ====
Arms of the Aragonese House of Trastámara

== Kings of Sardinia ==
=== House of Trastámara, 1412–1516 ===
Name	Portrait	Birth	Marriage(s)	Death
John II of Aragon; 1458–1479	John II	29 June 1398; Medina del Campo son of Ferdinand I and Eleanor of Alburquerque	Blanche I of Navarre; 6 November 1419; 4 children Juana Enríquez; April 1444; 2 children	20 January 1479; Barcelona aged 80
Ferdinand II of Aragon; 1479–1516	Ferdinand II	10 March 1452 son of John II of Aragon and Juana Enriquez	Isabella I of Castile; 19 October 1469; 5 children Germaine of Foix; 1505; No children	23 January 1516; Madrigalejo aged 63
Joanna of Castile; 1516–1555	Joanna	6 November 1479 daughter of Ferdinand II of Aragon and Isabella I of Castile	Philip IV of Burgundy, 1496; 6 children	12 April 1555; Madrigalejo aged 75

Nominally co-monarch of her son Charles, Joanna was kept imprisoned almost during her whole reign.

=== House of Habsburg (Spanish branch), 1516–1700 ===
Name	Portrait	Birth	Marriage(s)	Death
Charles I of Spain co-king with his mother Joanna; 1516–1556	Charles IV	24 February 1500; Ghent son of Philip I of Castile and Joanna of Castile	Isabella of Portugal; 10 March 1526; 3 children	21 September 1558; Yuste aged 58
Philip II of Spain; 1556–1598	Philip I	21 May 1527; Valladolid son of Charles IV and Isabella of Portugal	Maria of Portugal; 1543; 1 child Mary I of England; 1554; No children Elisabeth of Valois; 1559; 2 children Anna of Austria; 4 May 1570; 5 children	13 September 1598; Madrid aged 71
Philip III of Spain; 1598–1621	Philip II	14 April 1578; Madrid son of Philip I and Anna of Austria	Margaret of Austria; 18 April 1599; 5 children	31 March 1621; Madrid aged 42
Philip IV of Spain; 1621–1665	Philip III	8 April 1605; Valladolid son of Philip II and Margaret of Austria	Elisabeth of Bourbon; 1615; 7 children Mariana of Austria; 1649; 5 children	17 September 1665; Madrid aged 60
Charles II of Spain; 1665–1700	Charles V	6 November 1661; Madrid son of Philip III and Mariana of Austria	Marie Louise d'Orléans; 19 November 1679; No children Maria Anna of Neuburg; 14 May 1690; No children	1 November 1700; Madrid aged 38

==== Coat of arms ====
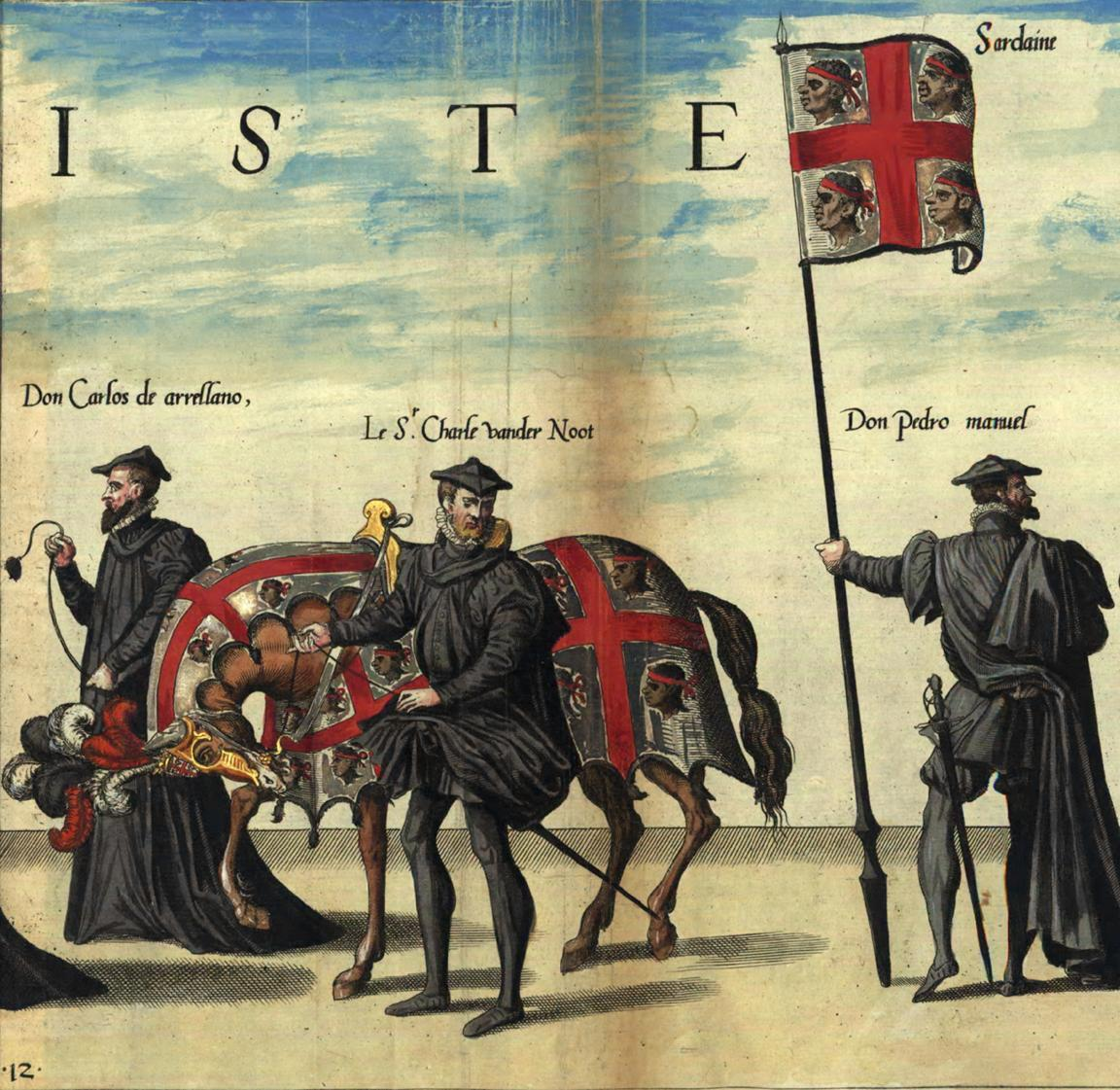
Flag of the Kingdom of Sardinia, middle of 16th century

Coat of arms of Emperor Charles V

Coat of arms of the House of Habsburg, Spanish branch (Sardinian variant)

=== House of Bourbon (Spanish branch) 1700–1708 ===
Name	Portrait	Birth	Marriage(s)	Death
Philip V of Spain; 1700–1708	Charles V	19 December 1683; Versailles son of Louis, Dauphin of France and Maria Anna of Bavaria	Maria Luisa of Savoy; 2 November 1701; 4 children Elisabeth of Parma; 24 December 1714; 7 children	9 July 1746; Madrid aged 62

Sardinia was taken over by Habsburg troops in 1708 during the War of the Spanish Succession in the name of the Habsburg claimant to the Spanish throne, "Charles III". At the end of the war, Sardinia remained in Charles' possession and, by the Treaty of Rastatt, was ceded to him.

==== Coat of arms ====
Coat of arms of Philip V of Spain

=== House of Habsburg (Austrian branch), 1708–1720 ===
Name	Portrait	Birth	Marriage(s)	Death
Emperor Charles VI; 1708–1720	Charles VI	1 October 1685; Vienna son of Leopold I, Holy Roman Emperor and Eleonore-Magdalena of Pfalz-Neuburg	Elisabeth Christine; 1 August 1708; 4 children	20 October 1740; Vienna aged 55

Spanish forces invaded the kingdom in 1717 during the War of the Quadruple Alliance. The island was under Spanish military occupation until 1720, when it was given back to Emperor Charles VI, who in turn ceded it to the Duke of Savoy by the Treaty of The Hague.

==== Coat of arms ====
Coat of arms of Archduke Charles of Austria

=== House of Savoy, 1720–1861 ===
The monarchs of the House of Savoy ruled from their mainland capital of Turin but styled themselves primarily with the royal title of Sardinia as superior to their original lesser dignity as Dukes of Savoy; however, their numeral order continued the Savoyard list.

Name	Portrait	Birth	Marriage(s)	Death
Victor Amadeus II of Savoy; 17 February 1720 - 3 September 1730	Victor Amadeus	14 May 1666; Turin son of Charles Emmanuel II, Duke of Savoy, and Marie Jeanne of Savoy	Anne Marie d'Orléans, Princess of France; 10 April 1684; 6 children	31 October 1732; Moncalieri aged 66
Charles Emmanuel III of Savoy; 3 September 1730 – 20 February 1773	Charles Emmanuel III	27 April 1701; Turin son of Victor Amadeus II of Sardinia and Anne Marie d'Orléans, Princess of France	Anne Christine of Sulzbach; 15 March 1722; 1 child Polyxena of Hesse-Rotenburg; 20 August 1724; 6 children Elisabeth Therese of Lorraine; 5 March 1737; 3 children	20 February 1773; Turin aged 72
Victor Amadeus III of Savoy; 20 February 1773 – 16 October 1796	Victor Amadeus III	26 June 1726; Turin son of Charles Emmanuel III of Sardinia and Polyxena of Hesse-Rotenburg	Maria Antonia Ferdinanda of Spain; 31 May 1750; 12 children	16 October 1796; Moncalieri aged 70
Charles Emmanuel IV of Savoy; 16 October 1796 – 4 June 1802	Charles Emmanuel IV	24 May 1751; Turin son of Victor Amadeus III of Sardinia and Maria Antonia Ferdinanda of Spain	Clotilde of France; 27 August 1775; No children	6 October 1819; Rome aged 68
Victor Emmanuel I of Savoy; 4 June 1802 – 12 March 1821	Victor Emmanuel I	24 July 1759; Turin son of Victor Amadeus III of Sardinia and Maria Antonia Ferdinanda of Spain	Maria Teresa of Austria-Este; 21 April 1789; 7 children	10 January 1824; Moncalieri aged 64
Charles Felix of Savoy; 12 March 1821 – 27 April 1831	Charles Felix	6 April 1765; Turin son of Victor Amadeus III of Sardinia and Maria Antonia Ferdinanda of Spain	Maria Cristina of Naples and Sicily; 7 March 1807; No children	27 April 1831; Turin aged 66
Charles Albert of Savoy; 27 April 1831 – 23 March 1849	Charles Albert	2 October 1798; Turin son of Charles Emmanuel, Prince of Carignan and Maria Cristina of Saxony	Maria Theresa of Austria; 30 September 1817; 3 children	28 July 1849; Porto aged 50
Victor Emmanuel II of Savoy; 23 March 1849 – 17 March 1861	Victor Emmanuel II	14 March 1820; Turin son of Charles Albert of Sardinia and Maria Theresa of Austria	Adelaide of Austria; 12 April 1842; 8 children Rosa Vercellana; 18 October 1869; 2 children	9 January 1878; Rome aged 57

In 1861, after the annexation of other states in the Italian peninsula, the Parliament of the Kingdom of Sardinia passed a law (Legge n. 4671, 17 marzo 1861) adding to the style of the sovereign the title of King of Italy, although the monarchs retained the designation of King of Sardinia. The Savoy-led Kingdom of Sardinia was thus the legal predecessor state of the Kingdom of Italy, which in turn is the predecessor of the present-day Italian Republic.

==== Coat of arms ====
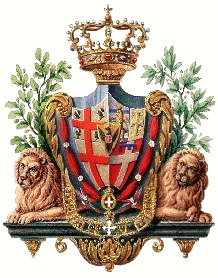
Coats of arms of the House of Savoy

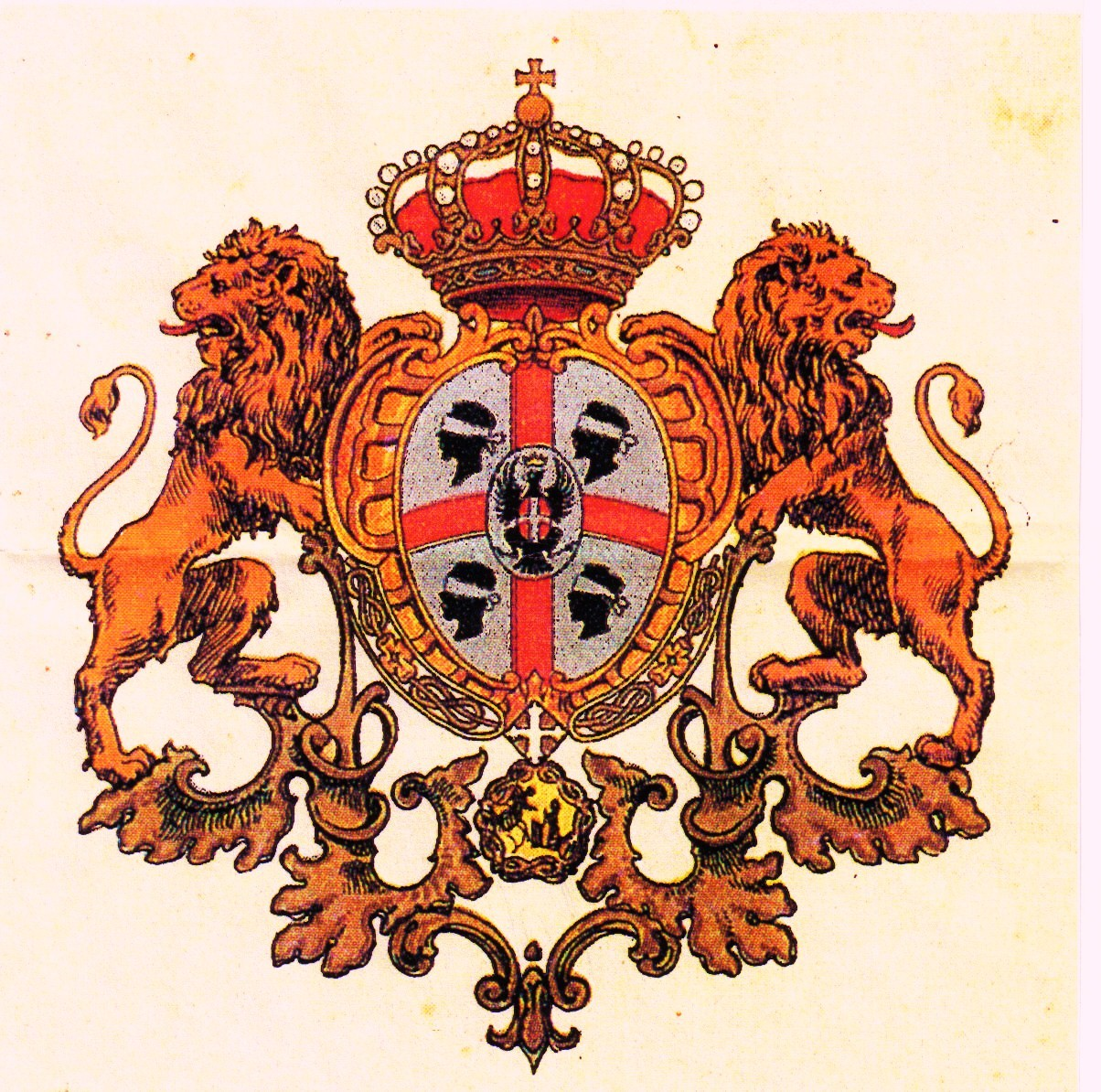
Coats of arms of the Kingdom of Sardinia until 1848

== Kings of Italy ==
=== House of Savoy, 1861–1946 ===
Name	Portrait	Birth	Marriage(s)	Death
Victor Emmanuel II of Savoy; 17 March 1861 – 9 January 1878	Victor Emmanuel II	14 March 1820; Turin son of Charles Albert of Sardinia and Maria Theresa of Austria	Adelaide of Austria; 12 April 1842; 8 children Rosa Vercellana; 18 October 1869; 2 children	9 January 1878; Rome aged 57
Umberto I of Italy; 9 January 1878 – 29 July 1900	Umberto I of Italy	14 March 1844; Turin son of Victor Emmanuel II of Savoy and Adelaide of Austria	Margherita of Savoy; 21 April 1868; 1 child	29 July 1900; Monza aged 56
Victor Emmanuel III of Italy; 29 July 1900 – 9 May 1946	Victor Emmanuel III of Italy	11 November 1869; Naples son of Umberto I of Italy and Margherita of Savoy	Elena of Montenegro; 24 October 1896; 5 children	28 December 1947; Alexandria aged 78
Umberto II of Italy; 9 May 1946 – 12 June 1946	Umberto II of Italy	15 September 1904; Racconigi son of Victor Emmanuel III of Italy and Elena of Montenegro	Marie José of Belgium; 8 January 1930; 4 children	18 March 1983; Geneva aged 78

The Kingdom of Italy was disestablished by the 1946 Italian institutional referendum, which was held on 2 June 1946, and the Italian Republic was proclaimed.

==== Coat of arms ====
Coats of arms of the Kingdom of Italy (1890–1929 and 1943–1946)

== See also ==
- List of consorts of the Savoyard monarchs
- List of viceroys of Sardinia

== Bibliography ==
- Manno, Giuseppe (1999). Storia di Sardegna (in Italian). Vol. II. Nuoro: Ilisso Edizioni. ISBN 88-85098-47-9.
- Casula, Francesco Cesare (1994). La storia di Sardegna: l'evo moderno e contemporaneo (in Italian). Vol. 3. Sassari: Carlo Delfino Editore. ISBN 88-7138-063-0.
- Pintus, Renato (2005). Sovrani, viceré di Sardegna e governatori di Sassari (in Italian). Sassari: Webber Editore.
- Brigaglia, Manlio; Mastino, Attilio; Ortu, Gian Giacomo, eds. (2006). Storia della Sardegna: dalle origini al Settecento (in Italian). Sassari: Editori Laterza. ISBN 88-420-7839-5.
- Casula, Francesco Cesare (1994). Breve storia di Sardegna (in Italian). Sassari: Carlo Delfino Editore. ISBN 88-7138-065-7.
- Abulafia, David (2000). "Charles of Anjou reassessed". Journal of Medieval History. 26 (1): 93–114. doi:10.1016/s0304-4181(99)00012-3. ISSN 0304-4181. S2CID 159990935.
- Dunbabin, Jean (1998). Charles I of Anjou: Power, Kingship and State-Making in Thirteenth-Century Europe. Bloomsbury. ISBN 978-1-13816-162-7.
