= Victor Amadeus III =

King of Sardinia from 1773 to 1796

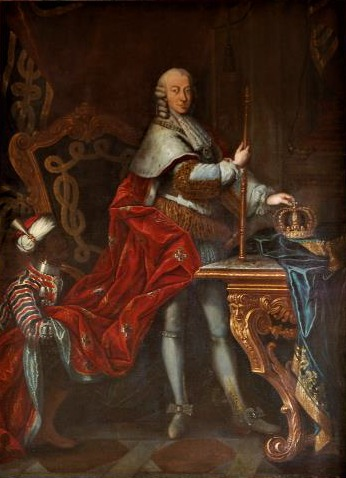
- Portrait by Giuseppe Duprà, c. 1775-84

King of Sardinia Duke of Savoy
- Reign: 20 February 1773 – 16 October 1796
- Predecessor: Charles Emmanuel III
- Successor: Charles Emmanuel IV
- Born: 26 June 1726; Royal Palace of Turin, Savoy
- Died: 16 October 1796 (aged 70); Castle of Moncalieri, Turin, Savoy
- Burial: Basilica of Superga, Turin
- Spouse: Maria Antonia Ferdinanda of Spain (m. 1750; died 1785)
- Issue: Charles Emmanuel IV, King of Sardinia; Princess Maria Elisabetta Carlotta; Marie Joséphine, Countess of Provence; Marie Thérèse, Countess of Artois; Maria Anna, Duchess of Chablais; Victor Emmanuel I, King of Sardinia; Princess Maria Cristina Ferdinanda; Maurizio, Duke of Montferrat; Maria Carolina, Electoral Princess of Saxony; Charles Felix, King of Sardinia; Giuseppe, Count of Asti
Names
- Italian: Vittorio Amedeo Maria di Savoia; French: Victor-Amédéé-Marie de Savoie
- House: Savoy
- Father: Charles Emmanuel III
- Mother: Polyxena of Hesse-Rotenburg
- Religion: Roman Catholicism

Victor Amadeus III (Vittorio Amedeo Maria; 26 June 1726 – 16 October 1796) was King of Sardinia and ruler of the Savoyard states from 20 February 1773 to his death in 1796. Although he was politically conservative, he carried out numerous administrative reforms until he declared war on Revolutionary France in 1792. He was the father of the last three mainline kings of Sardinia.

== Early life ==
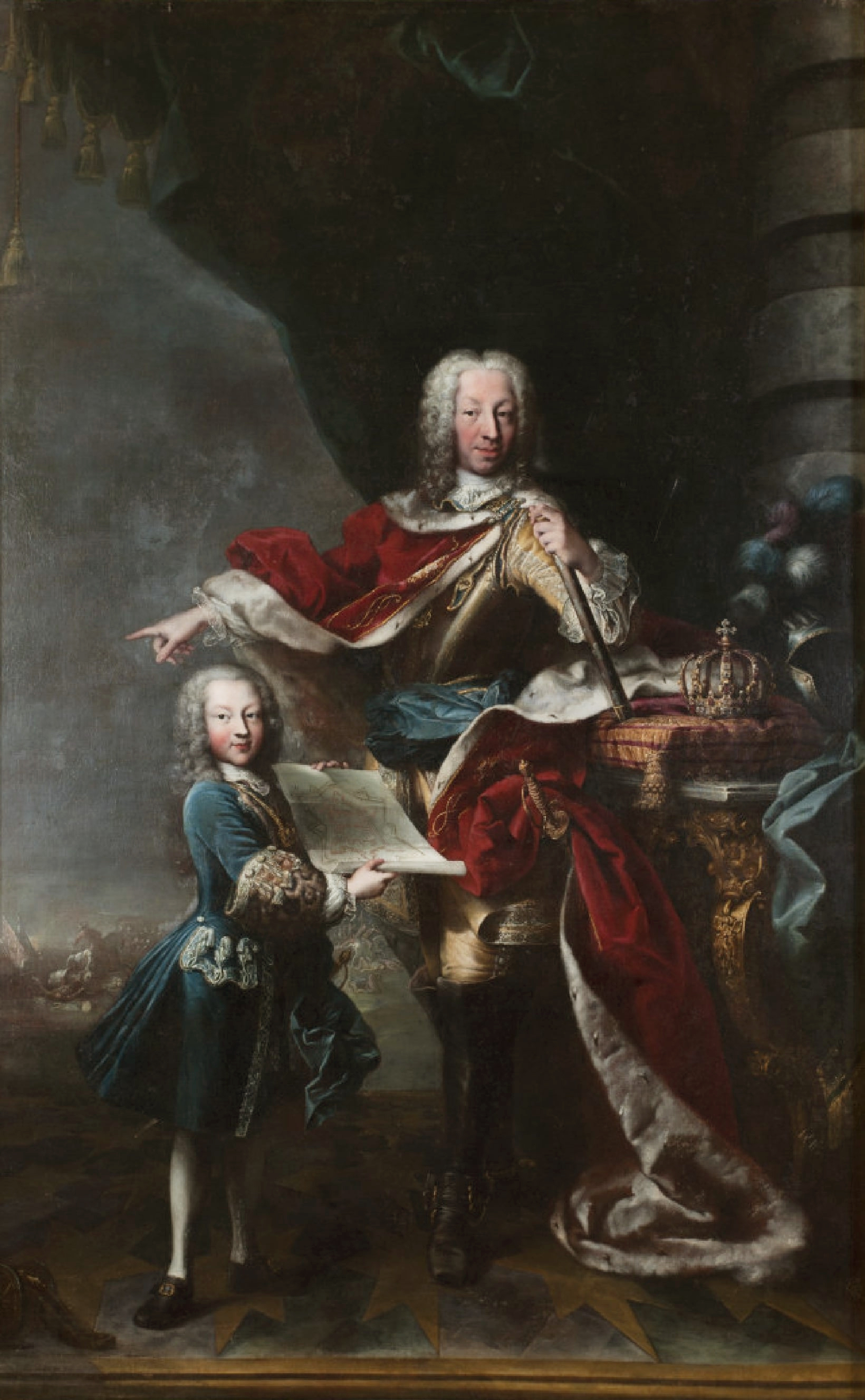
Prince Victor Amadeus with his father, portrait by Clementi

Born at the Royal Palace of Turin, he was a son of King Charles Emmanuel III and his second wife, Polyxena of Hesse-Rotenburg. He was styled the Duke of Savoy from birth until he succeeded to his father's throne. He was the eldest son of his parents and was the heir apparent from birth which was greeted with much celebration. His father had had a son with his first wife, Countess Palatine Anne Christine of Sulzbach, who was also named Victor Amadeus, Duke of Aosta, but died in 1725. His education was entrusted to Gerdil Giacinto Sigismondo, with a particular emphasis on military training.

It is said that he was a privately conservative person, and, as a young boy, was not considered by the public. His father felt him to be unsuitable to hold power.

== King of Sardinia ==
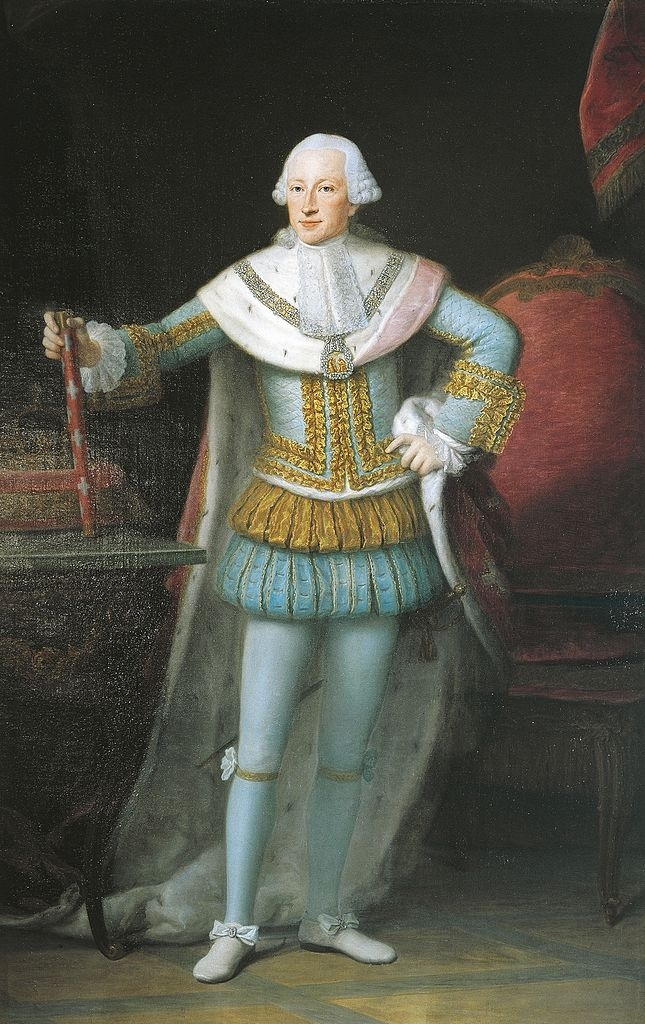
Portrait of KingVictor Amadeus III, by Alexander Roslin

When Victor Amadeus came to the throne in 1773 he started working on bureaucratic and military aspects of the reign. He approved and set up two new important cultural state institutions on the advice of the bourgeoisie and aristocracy alike. He started works of improvements in the port of Nice, and had dams in the Arce and the road of the Côte built. At the outbreak of the French Revolution, Victor Amadeus III allowed his two sons-in-law, the Counts of Artois and Provence and the Princesses Marie Adélaïde and Victoire to stay in his kingdom under his protection. After four years of fighting, the French under Napoleon Bonaparte had beaten the Piedmontese army in the Battle of Montenotte (12 April 1796), the Battle of Millesimo (13–14 April 1796) and the Battle of Mondovi (21 April 1796). On 26 April the French proclaimed the Republic of Alba in the occupied territories. Two days later, with the Armistice of Cherasco, the republic was ceded back to Victor Amadeus.

He was forced to sign the Treaty of Paris on 15 May, abandoning the First Coalition against the French Republic. The terms of the treaty required him to cede the fortresses of Cuneo, Ceva, Alessandria and Tortona to France, and allow free passage of the latter's armies towards Italy. He was also compelled to cede Nice and Savoy.

== Personal life and issue ==
He married Infanta Maria Antonia of Spain, youngest daughter of Philip V of Spain and Elisabeth Farnese. They were married on 31 May 1750 at Oulx and later had twelve children. It is known that she exerted little influence over her husband. The marriage had been arranged by Maria Antonietta's half-brother, the ruling Ferdinand VI. The Spanish Infanta had been previously rejected by Louis, Dauphin of France. The union was used to strengthen relations between Madrid and Turin having fought on opposing sides in the War of the Austrian Succession. The Treaty of Aix-la-Chapelle (1748) ended the war. His children were:

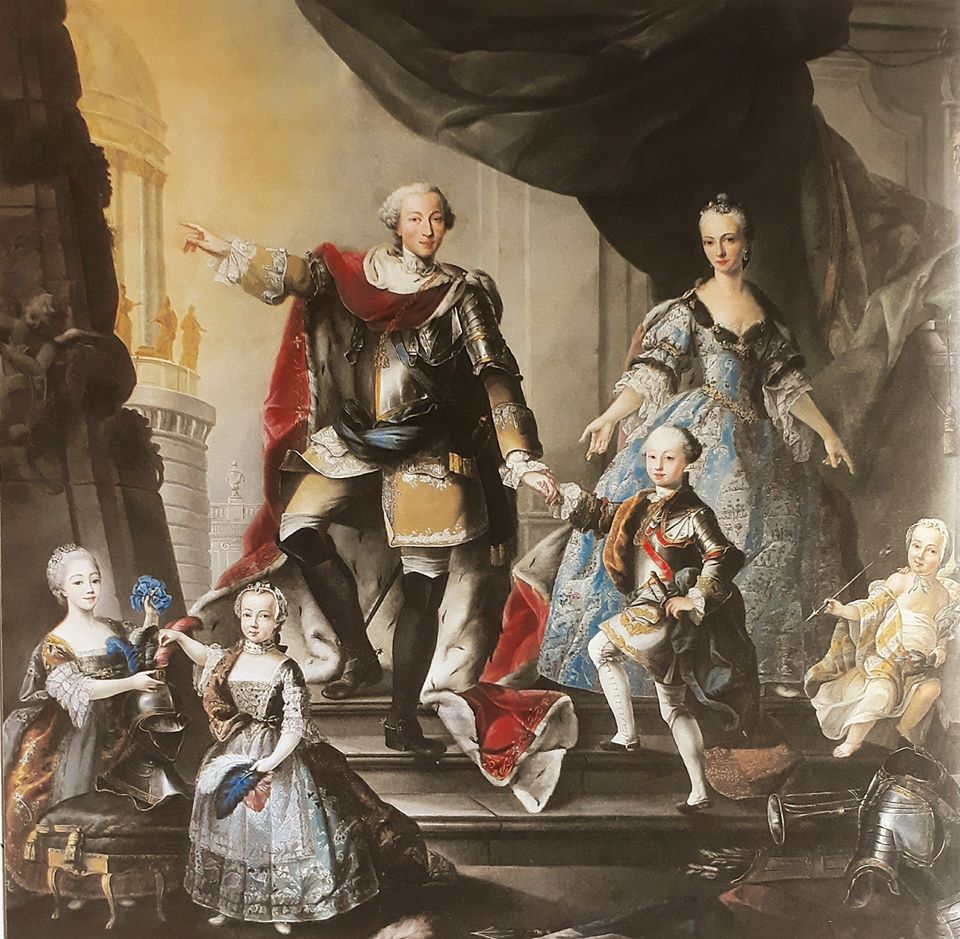
Family of the future King of Sardinia in 1760, Giuseppe Duprà

1. Charles Emmanuel IV of Sardinia (24 May 1751 – 6 October 1819) married Princess Marie Clotilde of France in 1775, no issue.
2. Maria Elisabetta Carlotta of Savoy (16 July 1752 – 17 April 1755) died in infancy.
3. Maria Giuseppina of Savoy (2 September 1753 – 13 November 1810) married Louis Stanislas, Count of Provence (later King Louis XVIII of France) in 1771, no issue.
4. Amadeus Alexander of Savoy (5 October 1754 – 29 April 1755) died in infancy.
5. Maria Teresa of Savoy (31 January 1756 – 2 June 1805) married Charles, Count of Artois (later King Charles X of France) in 1773, had issue.
6. Maria Anna of Savoy (17 December 1757 – 11 October 1824) married Prince Benedetto of Savoy in 1775, no issue.
7. Victor Emmanuel I of Sardinia (24 July 1759 – 10 January 1824) married Archduchess Maria Theresa of Austria-Este in 1789, had issue.
8. Maria Cristina Ferdinanda of Savoy (21 November 1760 – 19 May 1768) died in childhood.
9. Maurizio of Savoy (13 December 1762 – 1 September 1799) died unmarried of malaria.
10. Maria Carolina of Savoy (17 January 1764 – 28 December 1782) married Antony, Electoral Prince of Saxony in 1781, no issue.
11. Charles Felix of Sardinia (6 April 1765 – 27 April 1831) married Princess Maria Cristina of Naples and Sicily in 1807, no issue.
12. Giuseppe of Savoy (5 October 1766 – 29 October 1802) died unmarried of malaria.

== Death and legacy ==
He died on 16 October 1796 at the Castle of Moncalieri having suffered an attack of apoplexy. Victor Amadeus died leaving an economically struggling kingdom and two key provinces – Savoy and Nice – which suffered at the hands of French revolutionary forces. He was buried at the Basilica of Superga in Turin.

In 1786 Victor Amadeus III moved the remains of many of his ancestors and kinsmen to the Basilica of Superga. He established the Gold Medal of Military Valour on 21 May 1793. He carried out improvements to the Palazzina di caccia of Stupinigi outside Turin. Victor Amadeus III also encouraged the extension of the Orto Botanico dell'Università di Torino as well as the Società Agraria di Torino, which he created in 1785. His first cousin the Landgrave of Hesse-Rotenburg was named after him.

Victor Amadeus III House of Savoy Born: 26 June 1726 Died: 16 October 1796
Regnal titles
Preceded by Charles Emmanuel III	King of Sardinia; 1796–1802	Succeeded by Charles Emmanuel IV
