= Piedmontese scudo =

Currency of Piedmont, Savoyard Kingdom of Sardinia

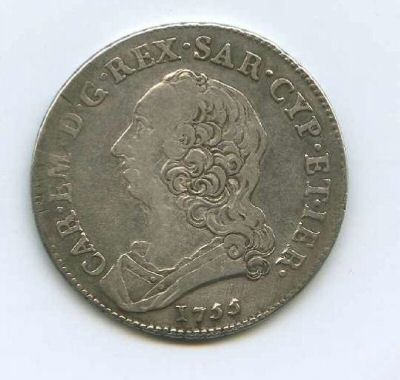
Carlo Emanuele III di Savoia, 1755

The scudo (plural: scudi) was the currency of the Piedmont and the other mainland parts of the Savoyard Kingdom of Sardinia until 1816.

== History ==
It was subdivided into 6 lire (singular: lira), each of 20 soldi or 240 denari. The doppia was worth 2 scudi. During the Subalpine Republic and French occupation (1800–1814), the French franc circulated, supplemented by a small number of locally produced coins. The scudo was replaced by the Sardinian lira.

== Coins ==
5 soldi 1794, Victor Amadeus III

In the late 18th century, copper 2 denari, billon ½, 1, 2½ and 7½ soldi, silver ¼, ½ and 1 scudo, and gold ¼, ½, 1, and 2½ doppia coins circulated. In the 1790s, copper 1 and 5 soldi, and billon 10, 15 and 20 soldi were added.

The Piedmont Republic issued silver ¼ and ½ scudo in 1799. This was followed in 1800 by bronze 2 soldi struck in the name of the "Piedmont Nation" (Nazione Piemontese).

== See also ==
- History of coins in Italy
