= Giuseppe Duprà =

Italian painter

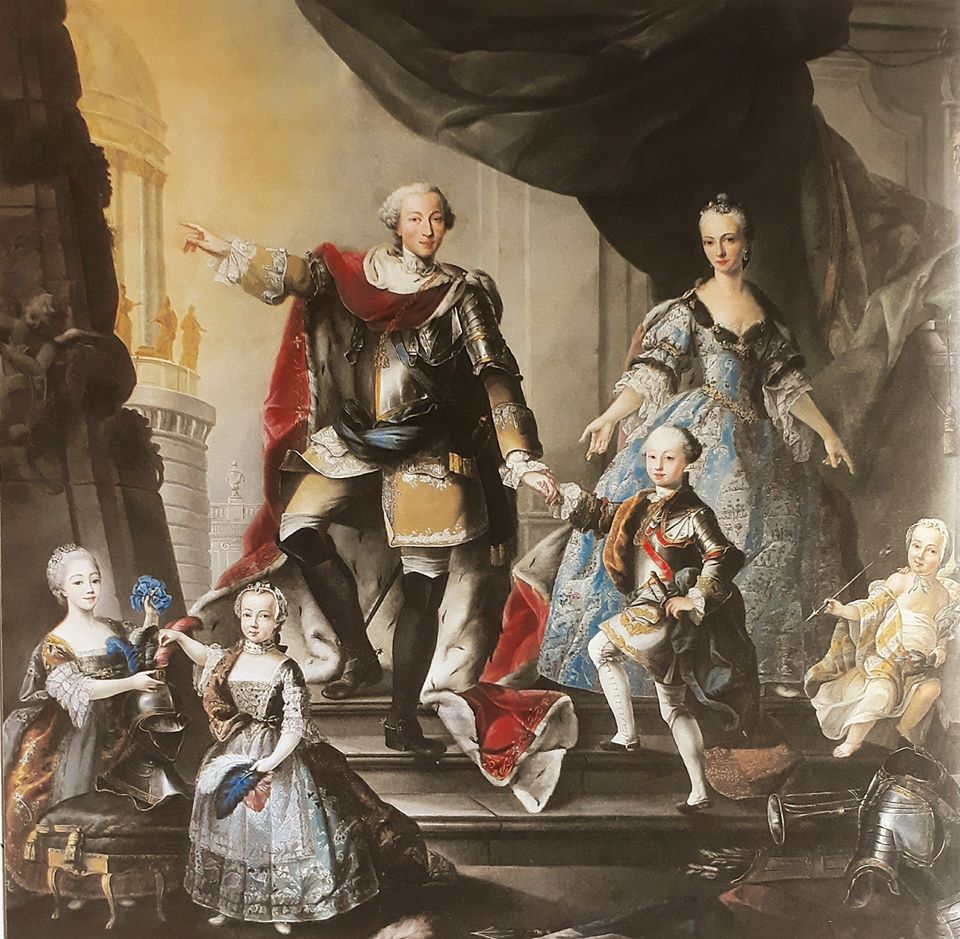
The family of Vittorio Amedeo III

Giuseppe Duprà (1703–1784) was an Italian painter born at Turin who was active in the eighteenth century.

Particularly in Turin, Kingdom of Sardinia with his elder brother Domenico, Giuseppe Duprà studied in Rome in his youth, as a disciple of Marco Benefial, from 1750, he began painting in the service of King Charles Emmanuel III in the Piedmontese capital, recommended by art enthusiast the Roman cardinal Alessandro Albani.

In collaboration with his brother, he created portraits and works aimed not only to the Savoyard House, but to the most important royal families: works were commissioned from Paris, Madrid, Austria and Bavaria.

Among his works, are seven portraits of Savoyard princesses preserved today at the Palazzina Di Caccia of Stupinigi, various decorative overdoors for the residence of Venaria and a large painting depicting the family of Vittorio Amedeo III, in the Royal Palace of Turin.

Duprà died at Turin in an advanced age, in 1784.
