= Treaty of Paris (1796) =

1796 treaty between Sardinia and France

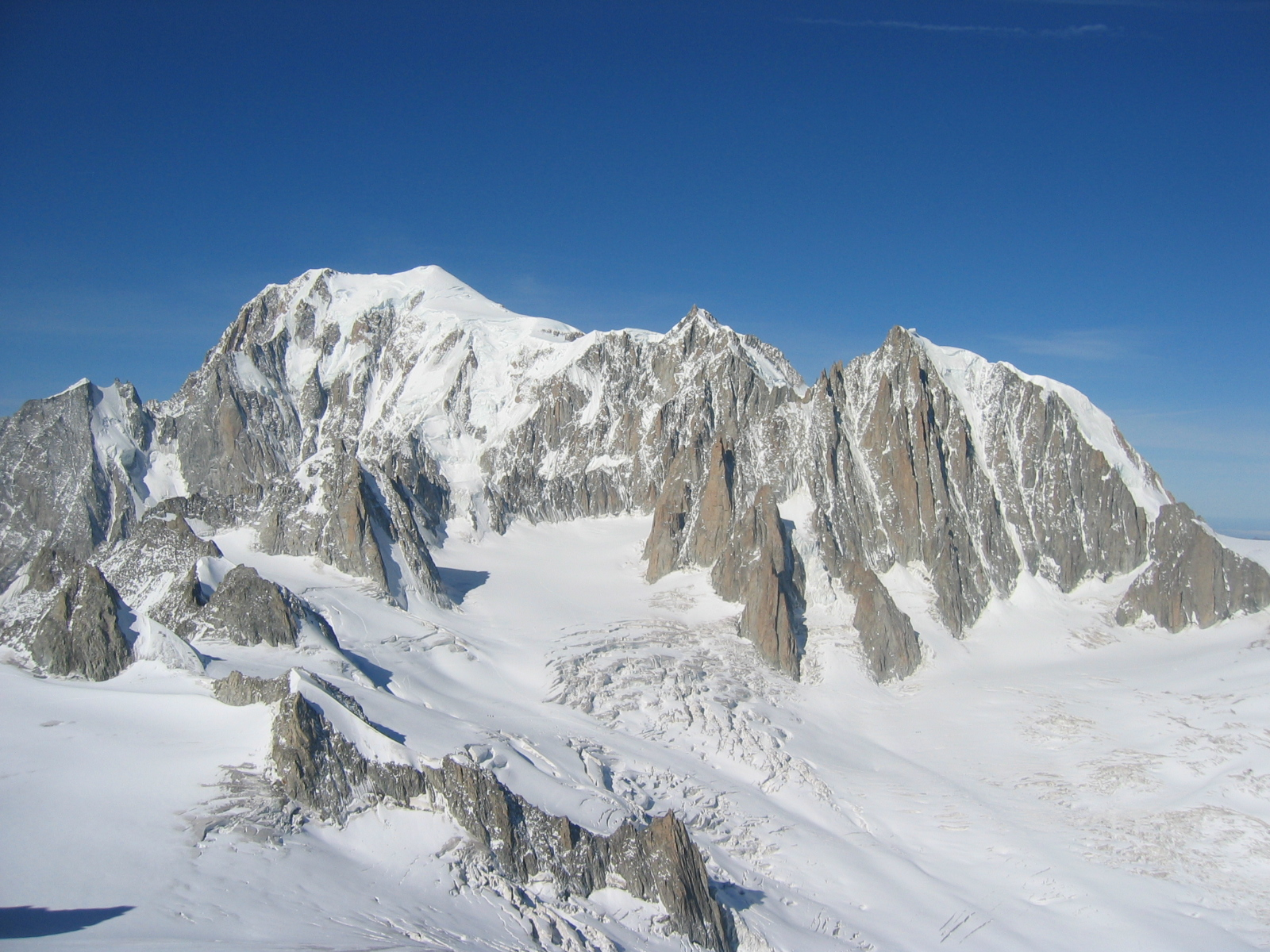
- The Alps of the new Franco-Piedmontese border
- Context: War of the First Coalition
- Signed: 15 May 1796
- Location: Paris, France
- Signatories: Charles Delacroix Count of Revel
- Parties: Kingdom of Sardinia French Republic
- Ratifiers: Executive Directory King Vittorio Amedeo III

The Treaty of Paris of 15 May 1796 was a treaty between the French Republic and the Kingdom of Piedmont-Sardinia during the War of the First Coalition.

After four years of fighting, the French under Napoleon had finally beaten the Piedmontese army in the Battle of Montenotte, and on 21 April 1796 in the Battle of Mondovi. This forced King Victor Amadeus III to sign an armistice at Cherasco one week later, abandoning the First Coalition against the French Republic.

In the treaty, King Victor Amadeus III recognized the French Republic, ceded the original Duchy of Savoy and the County of Nice to France and gave the French Revolutionary Army free passage through his territory towards the rest of Italy. The King died a few months after signing the treaty.

The French interest in Savoy had already been demonstrated in 1792 when the revolutionaries had annexed these lands as the 84th French Département under the name Mont-Blanc. This had provoked the war with Piedmont-Sardinia.

Piedmont-Sardinia never accepted these losses and in the Treaty of Paris (1814) they retrieved part of Savoy, and one year later in the Treaty of Paris (1815), the rest of these territories. They would be regained by France under Napoleon III.
