= Victor Emmanuel I =

King of Sardinia from 1802 to 1821

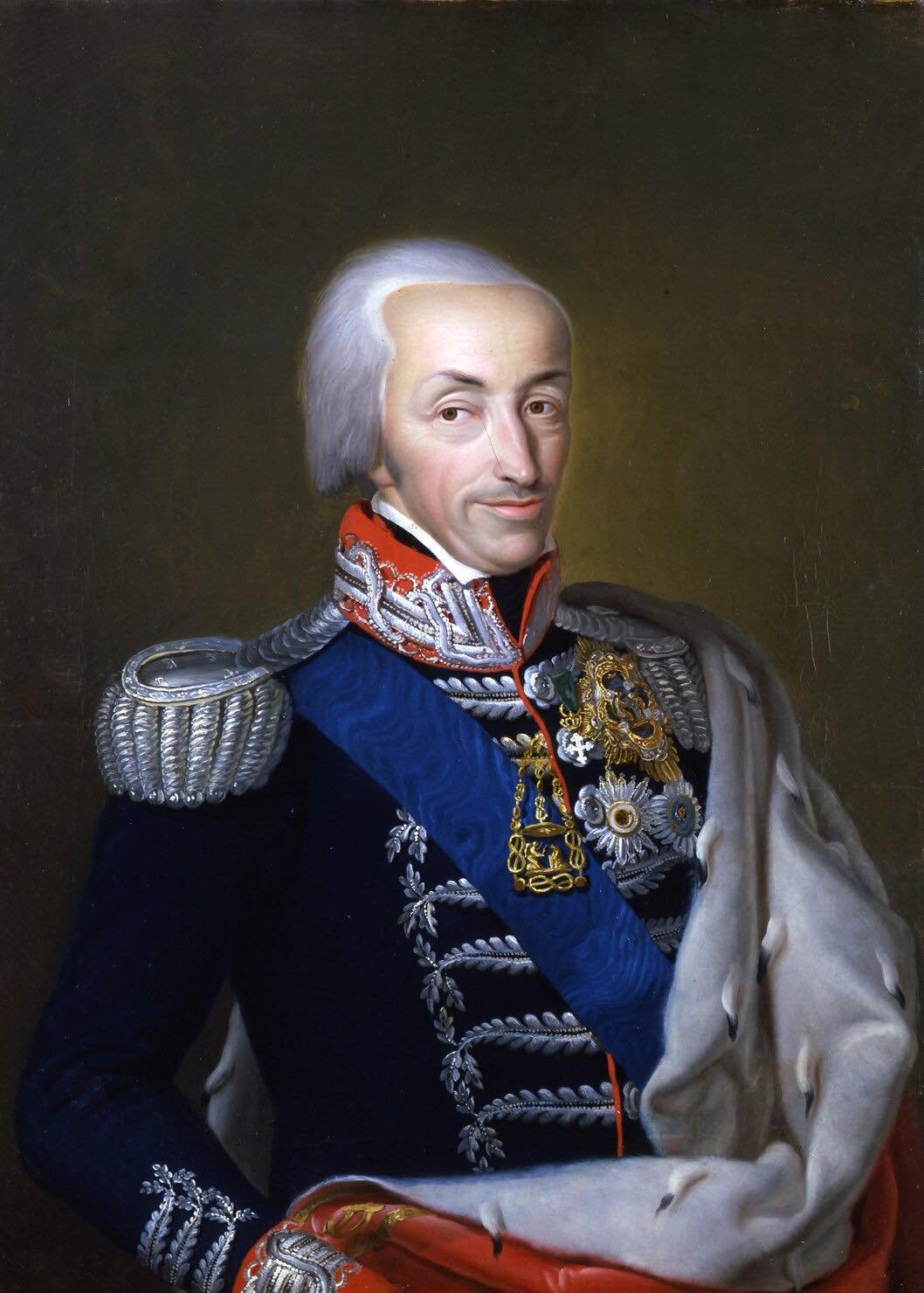
- Portrait of Victor Emmanuel I in coronation robes by Luigi Bernero

King of Sardinia Duke of Savoy
- Reign: 4 June 1802 – 12 March 1821
- Predecessor: Charles Emmanuel IV
- Successor: Charles Felix
- Born: 24 July 1759; Royal Palace of Turin, Turin, Kingdom of Sardinia
- Died: 10 January 1824 (aged 64); Castle of Moncalieri, Turin, Kingdom of Sardinia
- Burial: Basilica of Superga, Turin
- Spouse: Maria Teresa of Austria-Este (m. 1789)
- Issue among others...: Maria Beatrice, Duchess of Modena; Maria Teresa, Duchess of Parma; Maria Anna, Empress of Austria; Maria Christina, Queen of the Two Sicilies
Names
- Vittorio Emanuele di Savoia
- House: House of Savoy
- Father: Victor Amadeus III
- Mother: Maria Antonia Ferdinanda of Spain
- Religion: Roman Catholicism

Victor Emmanuel I (Italian: Vittorio Emanuele; 24 July 1759 – 10 January 1824) was the Duke of Savoy, King of Sardinia and ruler of the Savoyard states from 4 June 1802 until his reign ended in 1821 upon abdication due to a liberal revolution. Shortly thereafter, his brother Charles Felix ascended the throne as the new king of Sardinia. Victor Emmanuel was the son of King Victor Amadeus III of Sardinia and Maria Antonia Ferdinanda of Spain. In 1789, he married Maria Theresa of Austria-Este, with whom he had seven children, including the future Empress of Austria. He was the King of Sardinia during the Napoleonic Wars, where he regained Piedmont after Napoleon's defeat in 1814.

== Biography ==
=== Early life ===
Victor Emmanuel was born on 24 July 1759 at the Royal Palace of Turin in Turin, Italy. He was the second son of King Victor Amadeus III of Sardinia, son of King Charles Emmanuel III of Sardinia and Polyxena of Hesse-Rotenburg, and his wife, Maria Antonia Ferdinanda of Spain, daughter of King Philip V of Spain and Elisabeth Farnese.

Victor Emmanuel was known from birth as the Duke of Aosta. From 1792 to 1796, Victor Emmanuel’s father had taken an active part in the struggle of the old powers against the revolutionary forces in France but was defeated and forced to make peace, signing the Treaty of Paris. The old king died shortly thereafter, and in December 1798, his eldest son and successor, Charles Emmanuel IV, was faced with a French occupation and eventually annexation, of his mainland territories.

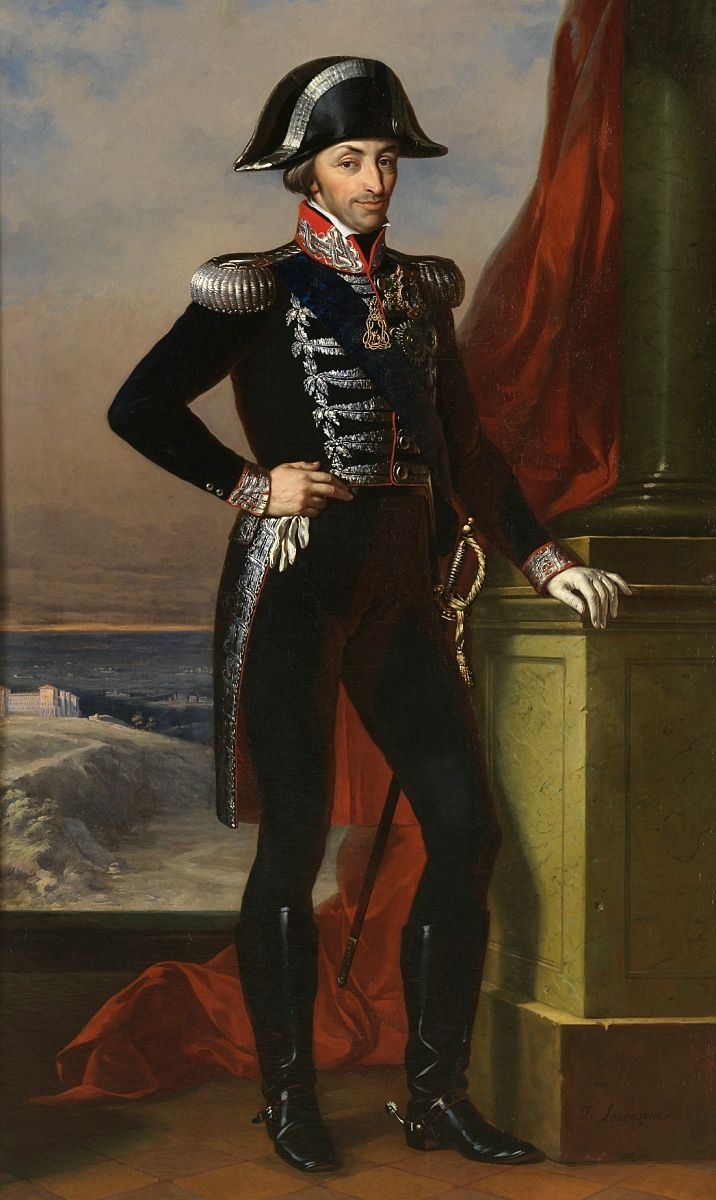
Posthumous portrait by Tommaso Lorenzone

=== Flight to Sardinia and accession ===
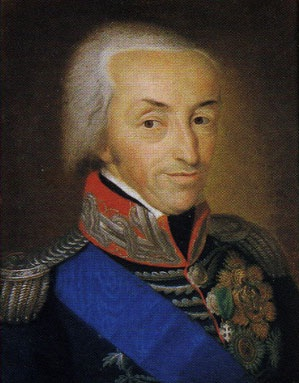
Portrait of Victor Emmanuel I, c. 1813–14

Charles Emmanuel and his family were forced to withdraw to Sardinia, which was the only part of his domains not conquered by the French. Charles Emmanuel himself took little interest in the rule of Sardinia, living with his wife on the mainland in Naples and Rome until his wife's death in 1802, which led the childless Charles Emmanuel to abdicate the throne in favour of his younger brother.

Victor Emmanuel took the throne on 4 June 1802 as Victor Emmanuel I. He ruled Sardinia from Cagliari for the next twelve years, during which time he constituted the Carabinieri, a Gendarmerie corps, still existing as one of the main branches of the Italy's Armed Forces.

In 1814, Napoleon was defeated, and Victor Emmanuel was able to return to Turin. His realm was reconstituted by the Congress of Vienna, with the addition of the territories of the former Republic of Genoa, and while he also wanted to annex Monaco, it only became a protectorate of his Kingdom. The latter became the seat of the Sardinian Navy. Victor Emmanuel abolished all the freedoms granted by the Napoleonic Codices and restored a fiercely oppressive rule: he restored the Regie Costituzioni of Victor Amadeus II and the Jus commune, strengthened customs barriers, refused to grant a liberal constitution, entrusted education to the Church and reintroduced laws concerning labour and the justice system which discriminated against Jews and Waldensians.

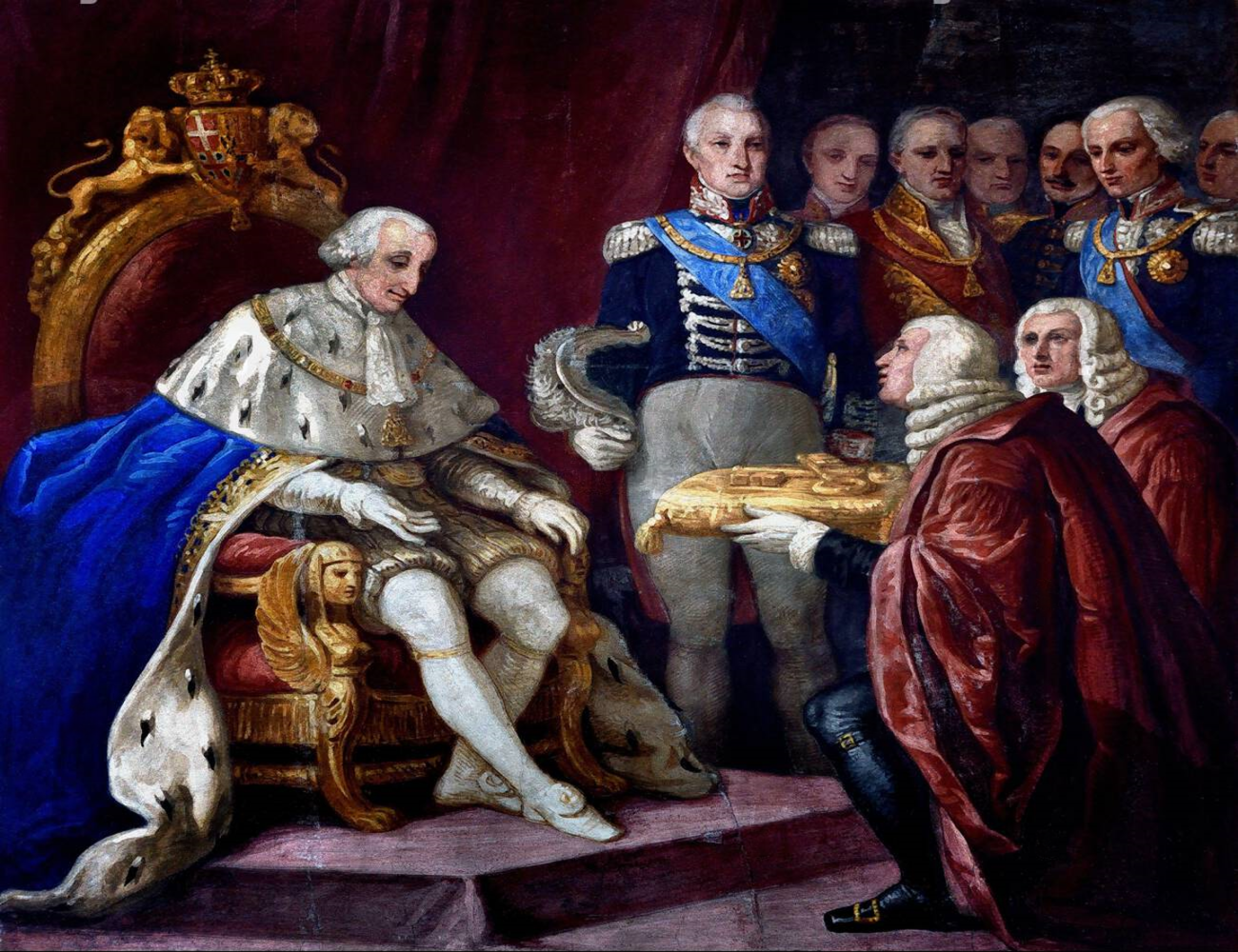
King Vittorio Emanuele I receives the keys to the city of Genoa, c. 1814

He nurtured expansionist ambitions in Lombardy, where nationalist anti-Austrian sentiments had developed, promoted largely by the bourgeoisie. This led to conflict with Austria. In March 1821, a liberal revolution exploded in Italy, largely the work of the Carbonari and it seemed that the anti-Austrian attitude of the revolutionaries matched that of Victor Emmanuel.

=== Abdication and later life ===
On Sunday 11 March 1821, the King called a meeting with the council of the crown, of which the members also included one of his distant cousins, Charles Albert. However, Victor Emmanuel was not willing to grant a liberal constitution as desired by the revolutionaries, so he abdicated the next day in favour of his brother, Charles Felix, on 12 March 1821. Because Charles Felix was in Modena at the time, Victor Emmanuel temporarily entrusted the regency to Charles Albert, who was second in line to the throne.

Since his abdication, Victor Emmanuel lived in several cities until 1824, when he returned to the Castle of Moncalieri, where he died. He is buried in the Basilica of Superga.

== Family and children ==
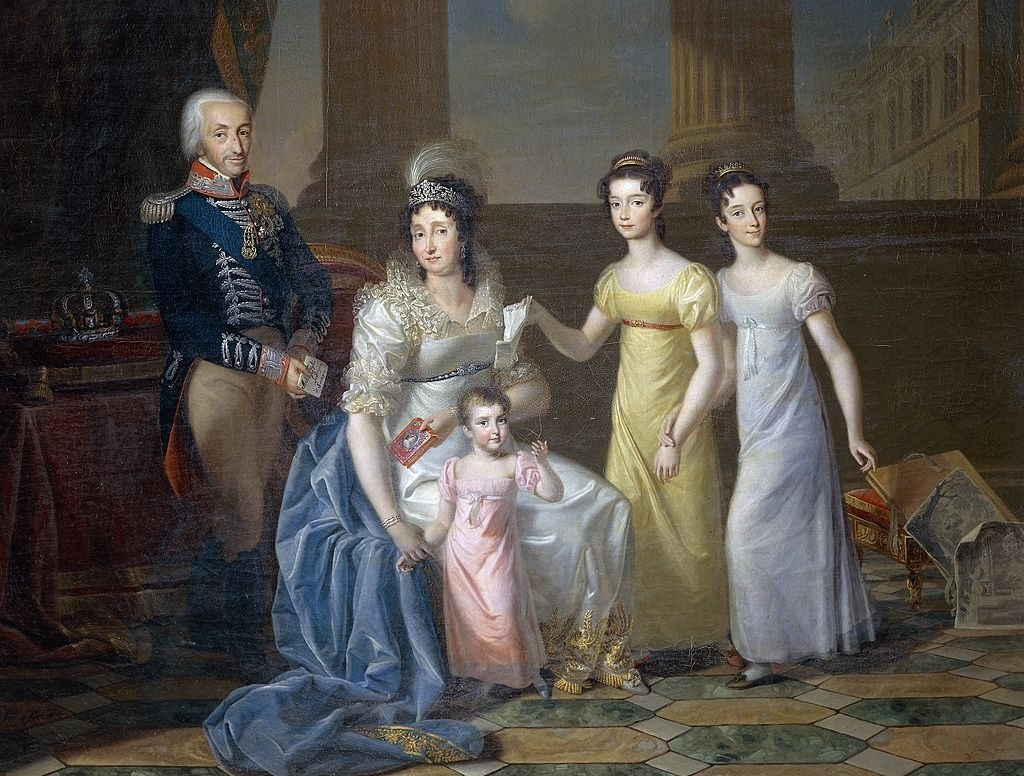
Portrait of Victor Emmanuel I with his family, c. 1813–14

On 21 April 1789, he married Archduchess Maria Teresa of Austria-Este, daughter of Ferdinand, Duke of Modena (who was the son of Francis I, Holy Roman Emperor).

They had six daughters and one son who died very young:

1. Maria Beatrice Victoria Josepha of Savoy (6 December 1792 – 15 September 1840); married her uncle Francis IV, Archduke of Austria and Duke of Modena.
2. Maria Adelaide Clothilde Xaveria Borbonia of Savoy (1 October 1794 – 2 August 1795); died in infancy.
3. Charles Emanuel (3 September 1796 – 9 August 1799); died of smallpox, died in early childhood.
4. A daughter (13 November 1800 – 10 January 1801)
5. Maria Teresa Fernanda Felicitas Gaetana Pia of Savoy (19 September 1803 – 16 July 1879); married Charles II, Duke of Parma (1799–1883).
6. Maria Anna Ricciarda Carlotta Margherita Pia of Savoy (19 September 1803 – 4 May 1884); married Ferdinand I of Austria.
7. Maria Cristina Carlotta Giuseppina Gaetana Elise of Savoy (14 November 1812 – 21 January 1836); married Ferdinand II of the Two Sicilies.

As a descendant of Henrietta of England, he carried the Jacobite claim to the thrones of England and Scotland.

== Ancestry ==
Ancestors of Victor Emmanuel I

8. Victor Amadeus II of Sardinia
4. Charles Emmanuel III of Sardinia
9. Anne Marie d'Orléans
2. Victor Amadeus III of Sardinia
10. Ernest Leopold, Landgrave of Hesse-Rotenburg
5. Polyxena of Hesse-Rotenburg
11. Princess Eleonore of Löwenstein-Wertheim-Rochefort
1. Victor Emmanuel I of Sardinia
12. Louis, Dauphin of France
6. Philip V of Spain
13. Duchess Maria Anna of Bavaria
3. Maria Antonia Ferdinanda of Spain
14. Odoardo Farnese, Hereditary Prince of Parma
7. Elisabeth Farnese
15. Countess Palatine Dorothea Sophie of Neuburg

== See also ==
- Napoleonic Wars

Victor Emmanuel I House of Savoy Born: 24 July 1759 Died: 10 January 1824
Regnal titles
Preceded by Charles Emmanuel IV	King of Sardinia; 1802–1821	Succeeded by Charles Felix
Titles in pretence
Preceded by Charles Emmanuel IV	— TITULAR — King of England, Scotland and Ireland; 1819–1824	Succeeded by Maria Beatrice of Savoy
