= Kingdom of Sardinia (1720–1861) =

Italian monarchy ruled by the House of Savoy (1720–1861)

Kingdom of Sardinia Regnum Sardiniae (Latin) Rennu de Sardigna (Sardinian) Regno di Sardegna (Italian) Regn ëd Sardëgna (Piedmontese)
- 1720–1861
- Top: State flag (1816–1848); Bottom: State flag (1851–1861) Coat of arms (1833–1848)
- Motto: FERT (Motto for the House of Savoy)
- Anthem: S'hymnu sardu nationale "The Sardinian National Anthem"
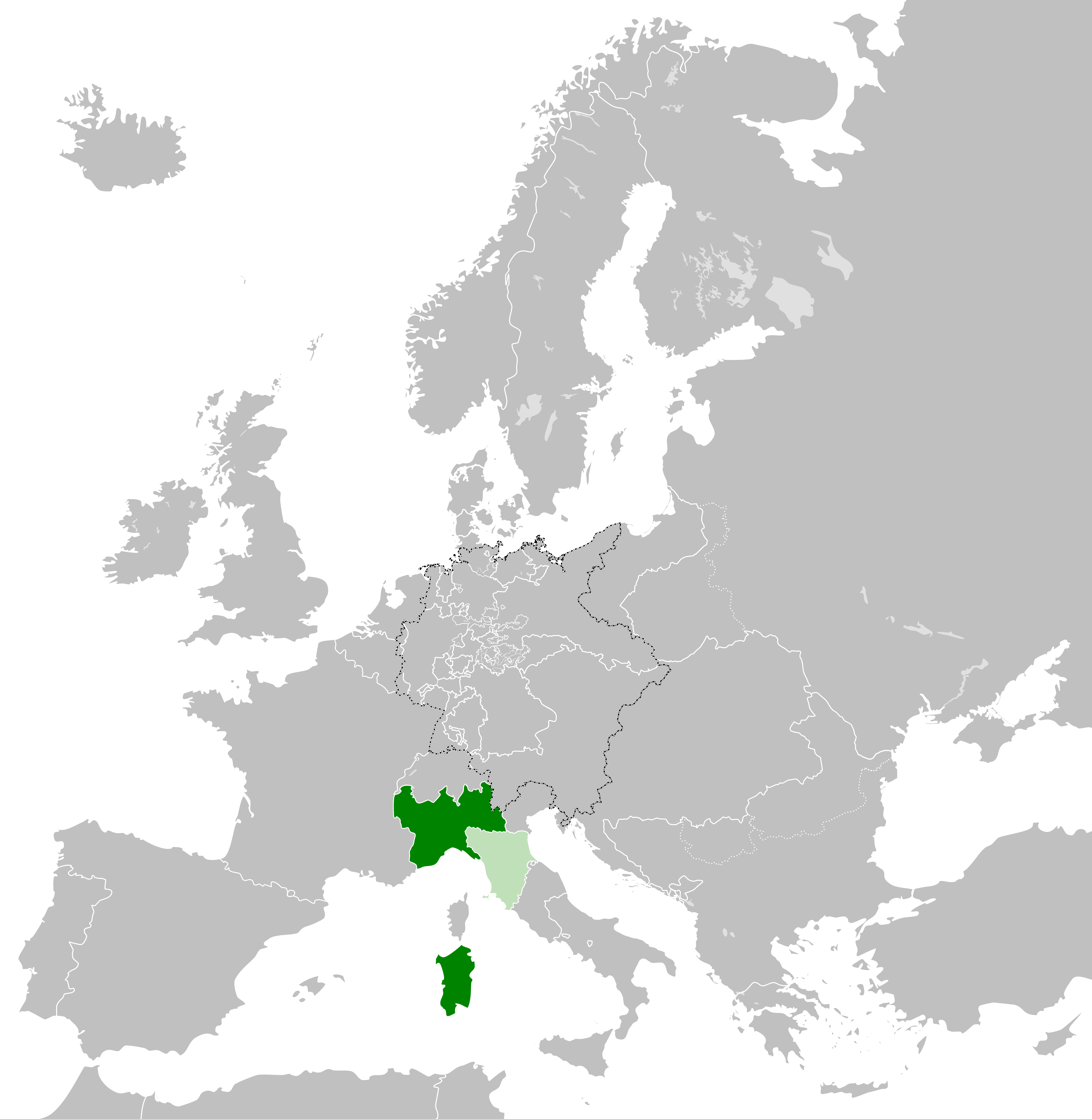
- Kingdom of Sardinia in 1859 including conquest of Lombardy; client states in light green
- Status: Sovereign state under Savoy (1720–1861): Composite state (1720–1847); Unitary state (1847–1861)
- Capital: Turin; Cagliari (1798–1814)
- Common languages: Italian (official), French (co-official in Savoy), Piedmontese, Ligurian, Occitan, Arpitan, Sardinian, Corsican, Catalan, and Spanish
- Religion: Roman Catholicism (official, 1848)
- Demonym: Sardinian
- Government: Absolute monarchy (1720–1848); Parliamentary constitutional monarchy (1848–1861)
- King
  - 1713–1730 (first): Victor Amadeus II
  - 1849–1861 (last): Victor Emmanuel II
- Prime Minister
  - 1848 (first): Cesare Balbo
  - 1860–1861 (last): Camillo Benso
- Legislature: Parliament
  - Upper house: Subalpine Senate
  - Lower house: Chamber of Deputies
- Historical era: Late modern
  - Established: 1720
  - Became part of the Savoy state: 1720
  - Perfect Fusion: 1847
  - Loss of Savoy and Nice: 1860
  - Became the new Kingdom of Italy: 1861

Population
  - 1821: 3,974,500
  - 1858: 5,041,853
- Currency: Cagliarese (1720–1813); Sardinian scudo (1755–1816); Piedmontese scudo (1713–1800); French franc (1800–1816); Sardinian lira (1816–1861)
Preceded by
Kingdom of Sardinia (1700–1720)
Duchy of Savoy
Republic of Genoa
United Provinces of Central Italy
Kingdom of the Two Sicilies
Succeeded by
Kingdom of Italy
Second French Empire
- Today part of: Italy; France; Monaco

The term Kingdom of Sardinia denotes the Savoyard state from 1720 to 1861. (Note: Prior to the Savoyard acquisition, the name of the state was originally Regnum Sardiniae or Regnum Sardiniae et Corsicae (when the kingdom was still considered to include Corsica) in Latin. It is Regno di Sardegna in Italian, Rennu de Sardigna [ˈrenːu ðɛ zaɾˈdiɲːa] in Sardinian, Regn ëd Sardëgna in Piedmontese, Regnu di Sardegna in Corsican, Reyômo de Sardègne in Arpitan, Reino de Cerdeña in Spanish, Regne de Sardenya [ˈrɛŋnə ðə səɾˈðɛɲə] in Catalan, and Royaume de Sardaigne in French. Despite this, every king of Sardinia continued to retain the nominal title of Rex Corsicae (King of Corsica). The kingdom was initially called Regnum Sardiniae et Corsicae, in that it was originally meant to also include the neighbouring island of Corsica, until its status as a Genoese land was eventually acknowledged by Ferdinand II of Aragon, who dropped the last original bit mentioning Corsica in 1479. Since then, the coinage minted since the establishment of the kingdom also bore the reference to Sardinia only.) From 1720 to 1847, only the island of Sardinia proper was part of the Kingdom of Sardinia, while the other mainland possessions (principally the Duchy of Savoy, Principality of Piedmont, County of Nice, Duchy of Genoa, and others) were held by the House of Savoy in their own right, hence forming a composite monarchy and a personal union, which was formally referred to as the "States of His Majesty the King of Sardinia". This situation was changed by the Perfect Fusion act of 1847, which created a unitary kingdom. Regardless, historians often use "Sardinia" as a synecdoche to designate the whole Savoyard state from 1720. Because Piedmont was the seat of power and prominent part of the entity, the state is also referred to as Sardinia–Piedmont or Piedmont–Sardinia, and sometimes erroneously as the Kingdom of Piedmont.

Before becoming a possession of the House of Savoy, the medieval Kingdom of Sardinia had been part of the Crown of Aragon and then of the burgeoning Spanish Empire. With the Treaty of The Hague (1720), the island of Sardinia and its title of kingdom were ceded by the Habsburg and Bourbon claimants to the Spanish throne to the Duke of Savoy, Victor Amadeus II. The Savoyards united it with their historical possessions on the Italian peninsula, and the kingdom came to be progressively identified with the peninsular states, which included, besides Savoy and Aosta, dynastic possessions like the Principality of Piedmont and the County of Nice, over both of which the Savoyards had been exercising their control since the 13th century and 1388, respectively.

Under Savoyard rule, the kingdom's government, ruling class, cultural models, and centre of population were entirely situated in the peninsula. The island of Sardinia had always been of secondary importance to the monarchy. While the capital of the island of Sardinia and the seat of its viceroys had always been Cagliari by law (de jure), it was the Piedmontese city of Turin, the capital of Savoy since the mid 16th century, which was the de facto seat of power. This situation would be conferred official status with the Perfect Fusion of 1847, when all the kingdom's governmental institutions would be centralized in Turin.

When the peninsular domains of the House of Savoy were occupied and eventually annexed by Napoleonic France, the king of Sardinia temporarily resided on the island for the first time in Sardinia's history under Savoyard rule. The Congress of Vienna (1814–1815), which restructured Europe after Napoleon's defeat, returned to Savoy its peninsular possessions and augmented them with Liguria, taken from the Republic of Genoa. Following Geneva's accession to Switzerland, the Treaty of Turin (1816) transferred Carouge and adjacent areas to the newly-created Swiss Canton of Geneva. In 1847–1848, through an act of Union analogous to the one between Great Britain and Ireland, the various Savoyard states were unified under one legal system with their capital in Turin, and granted a constitution, the Statuto Albertino.

By the time of the Crimean War in 1853, the Savoyards had built the kingdom into a strong power. There followed the annexation of Lombardy (1859), the central Italian states and the Kingdom of the Two Sicilies (1860), Venetia (1866), and the Papal States (1870). On 17 March 1861, to more accurately reflect its new geographic, cultural and political extent, the Kingdom of Sardinia changed its name to the Kingdom of Italy, and its capital was eventually moved first to Florence and then to Rome. The Savoy-led Kingdom of Sardinia was thus the legal predecessor state of the Kingdom of Italy, which in turn is the predecessor of the present-day Italian Republic.

== Terminology ==
The Kingdom of Sardinia was the title with the highest rank among the territories possessed by the House of Savoy, and hence this title was and still is used often to indicate the whole of their possessions. In reality, the Savoys ruled not a unitary state, but a complex array of different entities and titles with different institutional, cultural, and legal backgrounds. These included for example the Duchy of Savoy, Duchy of Aosta, Principality of Piedmont, and County of Nice, which were distinct and not juridically part of the Kingdom of Sardinia, which included only the island of Sardinia itself. The situation changed with the Perfect Fusion of 1847, an act of King Charles Albert of Sardinia that abolished the administrative differences between the mainland states and the island of Sardinia, creating a unitary kingdom. The Savoys themselves referred to their possessions as a whole as "the States of the King of Sardinia" (Italian: gli Stati del Re di Sardegna). Modern-day historians use the term Savoyard state to indicate this entity, which is an example of composite monarchy where many different and distinct territories are united in a personal union by having the same ruler.

== History ==
=== Early history of Savoy ===
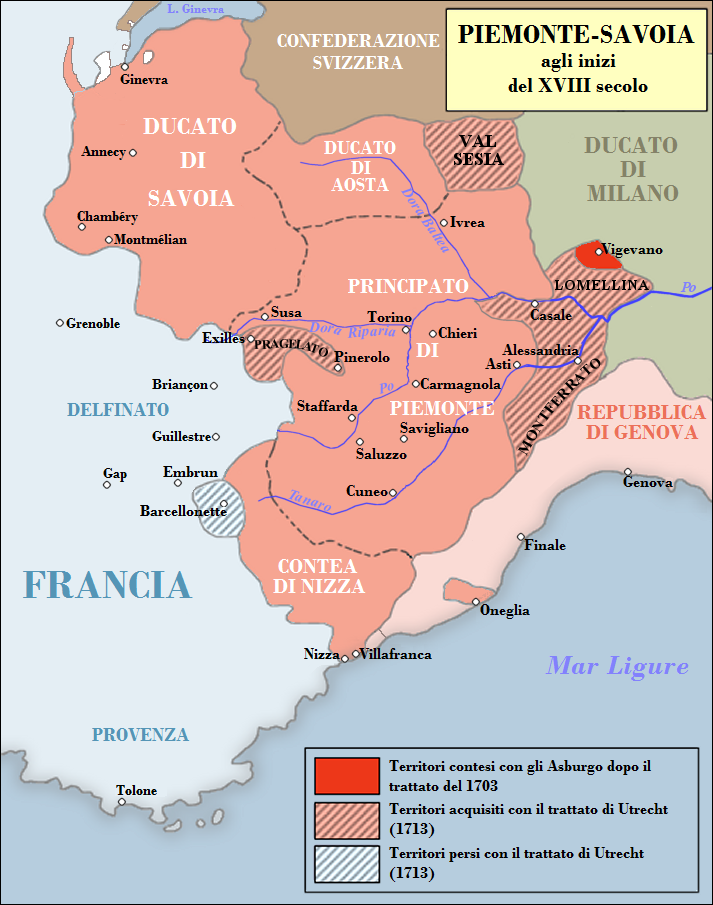
The Savoyards' Italian possessions in the early 18th century

During the 3rd century BC, the Allobroges settled down in the region between the Rhône and the Alps. This region, named Allobrigia and later "Sapaudia" in Latin, was integrated to the Roman Empire. In the 5th century, the region of Savoy was ceded by the Western Roman Empire to the Burgundians and became part of the Kingdom of Burgundy.

Piedmont was inhabited in early historic times by Celto-Ligurian tribes such as the Taurini and the Salassi. They later submitted to the Romans (c. 220 BC), who founded several colonies there including Augusta Taurinorum (Turin) and Eporedia (Ivrea). After the fall of the Western Roman Empire, the region was repeatedly invaded by the Burgundians, the Goths (5th century), Byzantines, Lombards (6th century), and the Franks (773). At the time, what is known today as Piedmont, as part of the Kingdom of Italy within the Holy Roman Empire, was subdivided into several marks and counties.

In 1046, Oddo of Savoy added Piedmont to their main segment of Savoy, with a capital at Chambéry (now in France). Other areas remained independent, such as the powerful communes of Asti and Alessandria, and the marquisates of Saluzzo and Montferrat. The County of Savoy was elevated to a duchy in 1416, and Duke Emmanuel Philibert moved the seat to Turin in 1563.

=== Exchange of Sardinia for Sicily ===
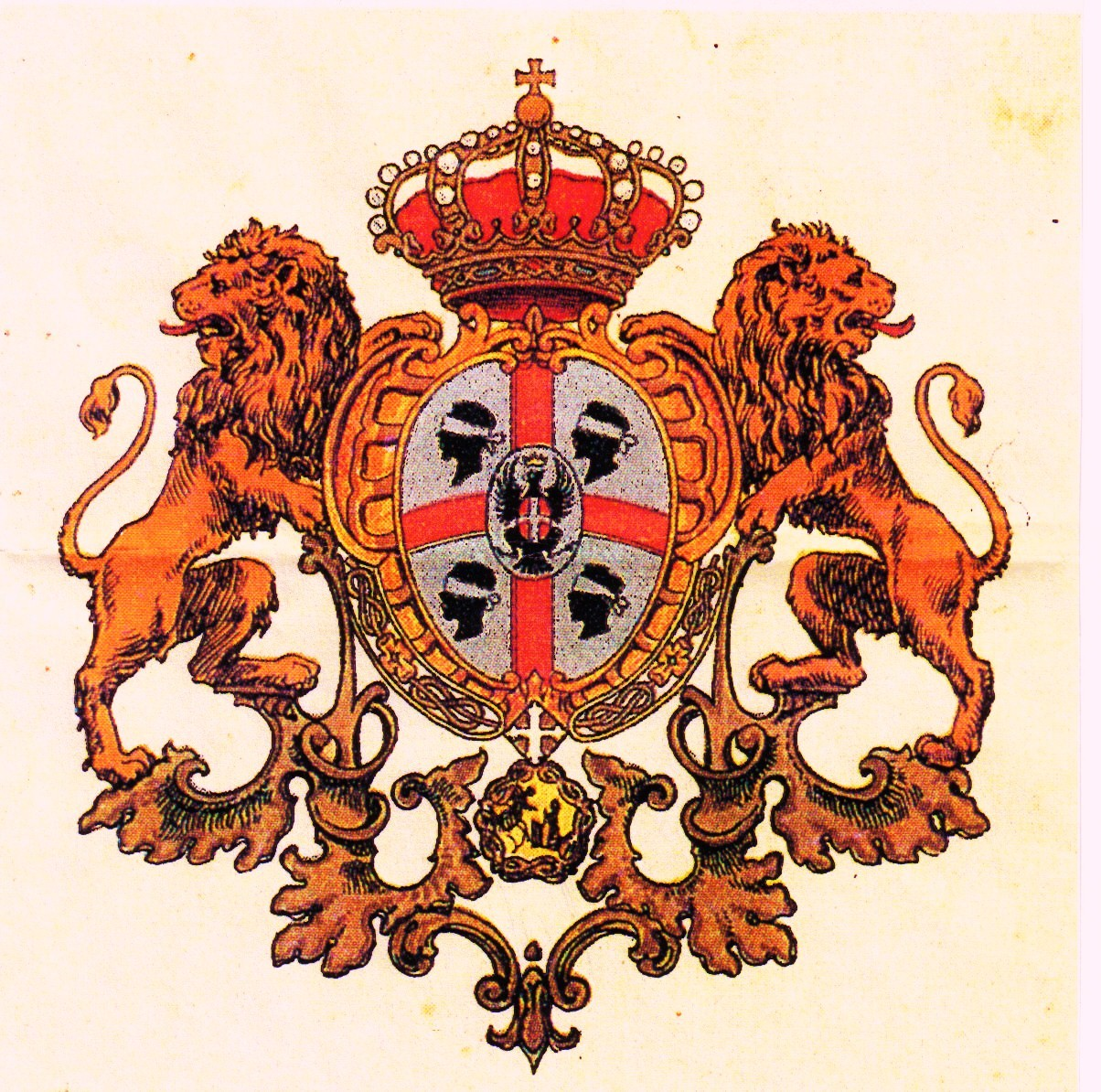
19th-century coat of arms of the Kingdom of Sardinia under the Savoy dynasty

The Spanish domination of Sardinia ended at the beginning of the 18th century, as a result of the War of the Spanish Succession. By the Treaty of Utrecht (1713), Spain's European empire was divided: Savoy received Sicily and parts of the Duchy of Milan, while Charles VI (the Holy Roman Emperor and Archduke of Austria), received the Spanish Netherlands, the Kingdom of Naples, Sardinia, and the bulk of the Duchy of Milan.

During the War of the Quadruple Alliance, Victor Amadeus II, Duke of Savoy, Prince of Piedmont, and by now also King of Sicily, had to agree to yield Sicily to the Austrian Habsburgs and receive Sardinia in exchange. The exchange was formally ratified in the Treaty of The Hague of 17 February 1720. Because the Kingdom of Sardinia had existed since the 14th century, the exchange allowed Victor Amadeus to retain the title of king in spite of the loss of Sicily. From 1720 to 1798, when Napoleon invaded Italy, the de facto government resided in Turin; Cagliari, which had been the capital of the Kingdom of Sardinia since 1324, returned to be the de facto government during the Savoy exile from 1798 to 1814. When Napoleon was first resided, the de facto government returned to Turin but did not officially become the capital of the Kingdom of Sardinia until 1847.

Victor Amadeus initially resisted the exchange of Sardinia for Sicilia in 1720. Until 1723, he continued to style himself King of Sicily rather than King of Sardinia. The state took the official title of Kingdom of Sardinia, Cyprus, and Jerusalem, as the House of Savoy still claimed the thrones of Cyprus and Jerusalem, although both had long been under Ottoman rule. In 1767–1769, Charles Emmanuel III annexed the Maddalena archipelago in the Strait of Bonifacio from the Republic of Genoa and claimed it as part of Sardinia, which became a part of the Sardinian region since then.

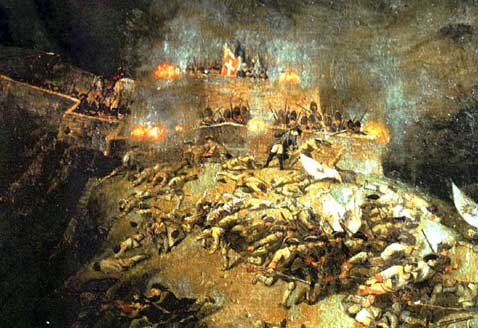
The Battle of Assietta during the War of the Austrian Succession 1747

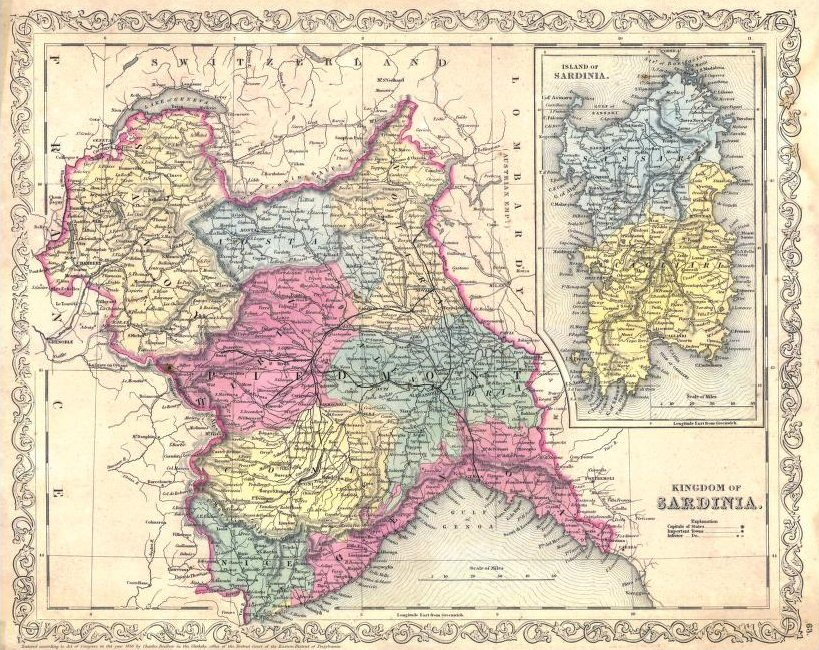
A map of the Kingdom of Sardinia in 1856, after the Perfect Fusion

Since the Iberian period in Sardinia, common languages included Sardinian, Corsican, Catalan, and Spanish. Other languages included French, Piedmontese, Ligurian, Occitan, and Arpitan. During the Savoyard period as a composite state, Italian, which alongside French had already been made official in the peninsula since the 16th century via the Rivoli Edict, was introduced to Sardinia in 1760. With the Regio Biglietto of 25 July 1760, Italian was made a priority over French in Piedmont. The Kingdom of Sardinia's attempt of promotion of a unitary language was incisive, and also the replacement of Spanish with Italian has been described as a "revolution of ideas". Since French was still in use in some provinces, the Statuto Albertino (1848) authorised the use of French.

=== Napoleonic Wars and the Congress of Vienna ===
In 1792, the Kingdom of Sardinia and the other states of the Savoy crown joined the War of the First Coalition against the French First Republic, but was beaten in 1796 by Napoleon and forced to conclude the disadvantageous Treaty of Paris (1796), giving the French army free passage through Piedmont. On 6 December 1798 General Joubert occupied Turin and forced Charles Emmanuel IV to abdicate and leave for the island of Sardinia. The provisionary government voted to unite Piedmont with France. In 1799, the Austro-Russians briefly occupied the city, but with the Battle of Marengo (1800), the French regained control. The island of Sardinia, having defeated the armies of the French expedition to Sardinia without the royal army's help, stayed out of the reach of the French for the rest of the war.

The refusal by the Savoyards of recognizing the Sardinian's rights and representation in government caused the Sardinian Vespers (also known as the "Three years of revolution") started by sa dii de s'aciappa ("the day of the pursuit and capture"), commemorated today as Sa die de sa Sardigna, when people in Cagliari started chasing any Piedmontese functionaries they could find and expelled them from the island. Thus, Sardinia became the first European country to have engaged in a revolution of its own, the episode not being the result of a foreign military importation like in most of Europe.

In 1814, the Crown of Savoy enlarged its territories with the addition of the former Republic of Genoa, now a duchy, and it served as a buffer state against France. This was confirmed by the Congress of Vienna, which returned the region of Savoy to its borders after it had been annexed by France in 1792. By the Treaty of Stupinigi (1817), the Kingdom of Sardinia extended its protectorate over the Principality of Monaco. In 1821, the Kingdom of Sardinia's reported population amounted to 3,974,500.

In the reaction after Napoleon, the country was ruled by the conservative monarchs Victor Emmanuel I (1802–1821), Charles Felix (1821–1831), and Charles Albert (1831–1849), who fought at the head of a contingent of his own troops at the Battle of Trocadero, which restored the reactionary Ferdinand VII to the Spanish throne. Victor Emanuel I disbanded the entire Napoleonic Code and returned the lands and power to the nobility and the Church. This reactionary policy went as far as discouraging the use of roads built by the French. These changes typified Sardinia.

The Kingdom of Sardinia industrialized from 1830 onward. A constitution, the Statuto Albertino, was enacted during the Revolutions of 1848 under liberal pressure. In addition to make Turin its official capital, the Statuto Albertino made Roman Catholicism "the only State religion". Earlier in 1847, the island of Sardinia, a Piedmontese dependency for more than a century, lost its own residual autonomy to the peninsula through the Perfect Fusion issued by Charles Albert. As a result, the kingdom's fundamental institutions were deeply transformed, assuming the shape of a constitutional and centralized monarchy on the French model; under the same pressure, Charles Albert declared war on Austria. After initial success, the war took a turn for the worse and Charles Albert was defeated by Marshal Radetzky at the Battle of Custozza (1848).

=== Savoyard struggle for the Italian unification ===
Camillo Benso, Count of Cavour

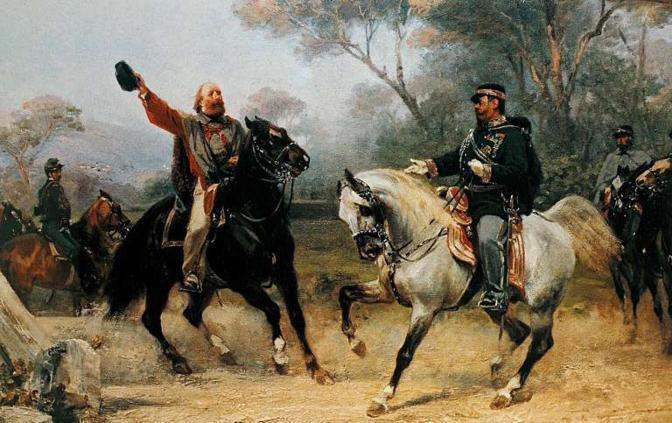
King Victor Emmanuel II meets Giuseppe Garibaldi in Teano, 26 October 1860.

Like all the various duchies and city-states on the Apennine Peninsula and associated islands, the Kingdom of Sardinia was troubled with political instability under alternating governments. After a short and disastrous renewal of the war with Austria in 1849, Charles Albert abdicated on 23 March 1849 in favour of his son Victor Emmanuel II. In 1852, a liberal ministry under Count Camillo Benso di Cavour was installed and the Kingdom of Sardinia became the engine driving Italian unification. The Kingdom of Sardinia took part in the Crimean War, allied with the Ottoman Empire, Britain, and France, and fighting against Russia.

In 1859, France sided with the Kingdom of Sardinia in a war against Austria, the Austro-Sardinian War. Napoleon III did not keep his promises to Cavour to fight until all of the Kingdom of Lombardy–Venetia had been conquered. Following the bloody battles of Magenta and Solferino, both French victories, Napoleon thought the war too costly to continue and made a separate peace behind Cavour's back in which only Lombardy would be ceded. Due to the Austrian government's refusal to cede any lands to the Kingdom of Sardinia, they agreed to cede Lombardy to Napoleon, who in turn then ceded the territory to the Kingdom of Sardinia to avoid "embarrassing" the defeated Austrians. Cavour angrily resigned from office when it became clear that Victor Emmanuel would accept this arrangement.

=== Garibaldi and the Thousand ===
On 5 March 1860, Parma, Piacenza, Tuscany, Modena, and Romagna voted in referendums to join the Kingdom of Sardinia. This alarmed Napoleon, who feared a strong Savoyard state on his south-eastern border and he insisted that if the Kingdom of Sardinia were to keep the new acquisitions they would have to cede Savoy and Nice to France. This was done through the Treaty of Turin, which also called for referendums to confirm the annexation. Subsequently, somewhat controversial referendums showed over 99.5% majorities in both areas in favour of joining France.

In 1860, Giuseppe Garibaldi started his campaign to conquer southern Italy in the name of the Kingdom of Sardinia. The Thousand quickly toppled the Kingdom of the Two Sicilies, which was the largest of the states in the region, stretching from Abruzzo and Naples on the peninsula to Messina and Palermo on Sicily. He then marched to Gaeta in the central peninsula. Cavour was satisfied with the unification while Garibaldi, who was too revolutionary for the king and his prime minister, also wanted to conquer Rome.

Garibaldi was disappointed in this development, as well as in the loss of his home province, Nice, to France. He also failed to fulfill the promises that had gained him popular and military support by the Sicilians: that the new nation would be a republic, not a kingdom, and that the Sicilians would see great economic gains after unification. The former did not come to pass until 1946.

=== Towards the Kingdom of Italy ===
On 17 March 1861, law no. 4671 of the Parliament of the Kingdom of Sardinia proclaimed the Kingdom of Italy, so ratifying the annexations of all other Apennine states, plus Sicily, to the Kingdom of Sardinia. The institutions and laws of the kingdom were quickly extended to all of Italy, abolishing the administrations of the other regions. Piedmont became the most dominant and wealthiest region in Italy and the capital of Piedmont, Turin, remained the Italian capital until 1865, when the capital was moved to Florence. As part of the Brigandage in the Two Sicilies, many revolts exploded throughout the peninsula, especially in southern Italy and on the island of Sicily, because of the perceived unfair treatment of the south by the Piedmontese ruling class. The House of Savoy ruled the Kingdom of Italy until 1946, when Italy was declared a republic by referendum. The result of the 1946 Italian institutional referendum was 54.3% in favor of a republic.

== Demographics ==
The Kingdom of Sardinia had a population of 5,044,853 in 1858. According to the 1858 census, about 86.5% of the population spoke Italian, while French was spoken by about 13.2% of the population, concentrated above all in Savoy and the Aosta district.

On the island of Sardinia, the dominant speech forms were the Sardinian dialect groups, chiefly Campidanese and Logudorese, which together accounted for the overwhelming majority of the island's inhabitants.

According to the 1858 census, Catholics were 99.3% of the total population. The largest religious minority were the Waldensians at 0.5%, concentrated overwhelmingly in the valley of Pinerolo.

== Economy ==
Major progress in the economy was achieved during the government of Camillo Benso, Count of Cavour. Cavour believed that economic progress had to precede political change, and stressed the advantages of railroad construction in the peninsula. He was a strong supporter of transportation by steam engine, sponsoring the building of many railroads and canals. Between 1838 and 1842 Cavour began several initiatives in attempts to solve economic problems in his area. He experimented with different agricultural techniques on his estate, such as growing sugar beets, and was one of the first Italian landowners to use chemical fertilizers. He also founded the Piedmontese Agricultural Society.

=== Currency ===
The currency in use in Savoy was the Piedmontese scudo. During the Napoleonic Wars, it was replaced in general circulation by the French franc. In 1816, after regaining their peninsular domains, the scudo was replaced by the Sardinian lira, which in 1821 also replaced the Sardinian scudo, the coins that had been in use on the island throughout the period.

== Government ==
Before 1847, only the island of Sardinia proper was part of the Kingdom of Sardinia. The other mainland possessions, which primarily included the Duchy of Savoy, Principality of Piedmont, County of Nice, and Duchy of Genoa, among others, were held by the Savoys in their own right. This resulted in the formation a composite monarchy and a personal union. This personal union was formally referred to as the "States of His Majesty the King of Sardinia", such as in the documents of the Congress of Vienna. The Perfect Fusion (Italian: Fusione perfetta) was the 1847 act of the Savoyard King Charles Albert of Sardinia which abolished the administrative differences between the mainland states and the island of Sardinia, in a fashion similar to the Nueva Planta decrees between the Crown of Castile and the realms of the Crown of Aragon between 1707 and 1716 and the Acts of Union between Great Britain and Ireland in 1800.

In 1848, King Charles Albert granted the Statuto Albertino, which functioned as the constitution of the state. The Statute was proclaimed only because of concern at the revolutionary insurrection agitating Italy in 1848. At the time, Charles Albert was only following the example of other Italian rulers, but his Statute was the only constitution to survive the repression that followed the First War of Independence (1848–49). The Statute remained the basis of the legal system after Italian unification was achieved in 1860 and the Kingdom of Sardinia became the Kingdom of Italy. Even though it suffered deep modifications, especially during the fascist government of Benito Mussolini (who ruled with the tacit approval of King Victor Emmanuel III), the Statute lasted mostly unaltered in the structure until the implementation of the republican constitution in 1948, which superseded several primary features of the document, with specific regard to those of monarchical nature. The head of state was the King of Sardinia, while the head of the government was the Prime minister of the Kingdom of Sardinia.

=== Military ===
The Royal Sardinian Army and the Royal Sardinian Navy functioned as the military of Kingdom of Sardinia until they became the Royal Italian Army on 4 May 1861 and the Regia Marina on 17 March 1861.

== Flags, royal standards, and coats of arms ==
When the Duchy of Savoy acquired the Kingdom of Sicily in 1713 and the Kingdom of Sardinia in 1723, the flag of Savoy became the flag of a naval power. This posed the problem that the same flag was already in use by the Knights of Malta. Because of this, the Savoyards modified their flag for use as a naval ensign in various ways, adding the letters FERT in the four cantons, or adding a blue border, or using a blue flag with the Savoy cross in one canton. Eventually, King Charles Albert of Savoy adopted from Revolutionary France the Italian tricolor, surmounted by the Savoyard shield, as his flag. This flag would later become the flag of the Kingdom of Italy, and the tricolor without the Savoyard escutcheon remains the flag of Italy.

Coat of arms

(1720–1815)

(1815–1831)

(1831–1848)

(1848–1861)
State flags

Royal standard of the Savoyard kings of Sardinia of Savoy dynasty (1720–1848) and state flag of the Savoyard states (late 16th–late 18th century)

State flag and war ensign (1816–1848), civil flag crowned

State and war flag (1848–1851)

State flag and war ensign (1851–1861)
Other flags

Merchant flag (c. 1799–1802)

War ensign of the Royal Sardinian Navy (1785–1802)

Merchant flag (1802–1814)

War ensign (1802–1814)

Merchant flag and war ensign (1814–1816)

Civil flag and civil ensign (1816–1848)

War ensign of the Kingdom of Sardinia (1816–1848), aspect ratio 31:76

Civil and merchant flag (1851–1861), the Italian tricolore with the coat of arms of Savoy as an inescutcheon
Royal standards

(1848–1861) and Kingdom of Italy (1861–1880)

Crown Prince (1848–1861) and Crown Prince of the Kingdom of Italy (1861–1880)
- Sources:
  - Breschi, Roberto (2004). "Bandiere degli Stati preunitari italiani: Sardegna". Rbvex.it (in Italian). Archived from the original on 31 May 2019.
  - Ollé, Jaume (11 October 1998). "Kingdom of Sardinia – Part 1 (Italy)". Flags of the World. Archived from the original on 25 February 2017.
  - Ollé, Jaume (13 October 1998). "Kingdom of Sardinia – Part 2 (Italy)". Flags of the World. Archived from the original on 25 February 2017.

== Maps ==
=== Territorial evolution of the Kingdom of Sardinia from 1859 to 1860 ===
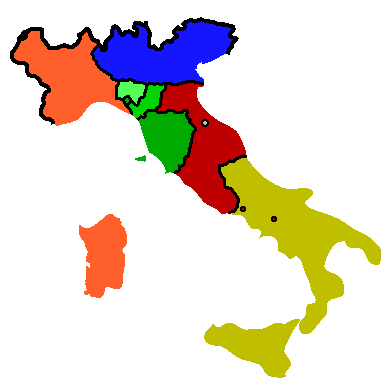
1859:
Kingdom of Sardinia
Kingdom of Lombardy–Venetia
Duchies of Parma–Modena-Tuscany
Papal States
Kingdom of the Two Sicilies
On the eve of the Second Italian War of Independence

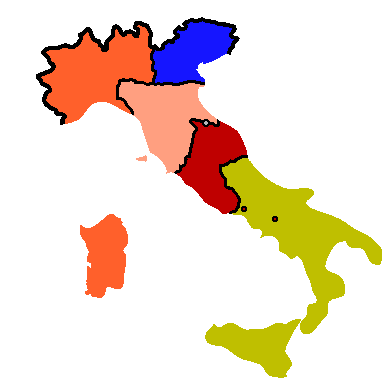
1860:
Kingdom of Sardinia
Kingdom of Lombardy–Venetia
United Provinces of Central Italy
Papal States
Kingdom of the Two Sicilies
After the annexation of Lombardy and before the annexation of the United Provinces of Central Italy

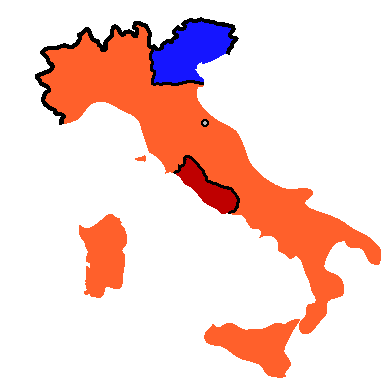
1861:
Kingdom of Sardinia
Kingdom of Lombardy–Venetia
Papal States
After the Expedition of the Thousand, and on the eve of the proclamation of the Kingdom of Italy

== See also ==
- List of viceroys of Sardinia
- History of Savoy from 1815 to 1860

== Bibliography ==
- Antonicelli, Aldo (2016). "From Galleys to Square Riggers: The Modernization of the Navy of the Kingdom of Sardinia". The Mariner's Mirror. 102 (2): 153–173.
- Hearder, Harry (1986). Italy in the Age of the Risorgimento, 1790–1870. London: Longman. ISBN 0-582-49146-0.
- Luttwak, Edward (2009). The Grand Strategy of the Byzantine Empire. The Belknap Press. ISBN 9780674035195.
- Mack Smith, Denis (1971). Victor Emanuel, Cavour and the Risorgimento. Oxford University Press.
- Martin, George Whitney (1969). The Red Shirt and the Cross of Savoy. New York: Dodd, Mead and Co. ISBN 0-396-05908-2.
- Murtaugh, Frank M. (1991). Cavour and the Economic Modernization of the Kingdom of Sardinia. New York: Garland Publishing. ISBN 978-0-8153-0671-9.
- Romani, Roberto (2012). "Reluctant Revolutionaries: Moderate Liberalism in the Kingdom of Sardinia, 1849–1859". Historical Journal. pp. 45–73.
- Romani, Roberto (2018). "The Reason of the Elites: Constitutional Moderatism in the Kingdom of Sardinia, 1849–1861". In Sensibilities of the Risorgimento. Brill. pp. 192–244.
- Schena, Olivetta (2019). "The Role Played by Towns in Parliamentary Commissions in the Kingdom of Sardinia in the Fifteenth and Sixteenth centuries". Parliaments, Estates and Representation. '39 (3): 304–315.
- Storrs, Christopher (1999). War, Diplomacy and the Rise of Savoy, 1690–1720. Cambridge University Press. ISBN 0-521-55146-3.
- Thayer, William Roscoe (1911). The Life and Times of Cavour vol 1. Old interpretations but useful on details; volume 1 goes to 1859]; volume 2 online covers 1859–62.

=== In Italian ===
- AAVV. (edited by F. Manconi), La società sarda in età spagnola, Consiglio Regionale della Sardegna, Cagliari, 2 volumes, 1992–1993.
- Blasco Ferrer Eduardo, Crestomazia Sarda dei primi secoli, collection Officina Linguistica, Ilisso, Nuoro, 2003, ISBN 9788887825657.
- Boscolo Alberto, La Sardegna bizantina e alto giudicale, Edizioni Della Torre, Cagliari, 1978.
- Casula, Francesco Cesare (1994). La storia di Sardegna. Sassari: Carlo Delfino Editore. ISBN 8871380843.
- Coroneo Roberto, Arte in Sardegna dal IV alla metà dell'XI secolo, AV eds., Cagliari, 2011.
- Coroneo Roberto, Scultura mediobizantina in Sardegna, Nuoro, Poliedro, 2000.
- Gallinari Luciano, "Il Giudicato di Cagliari tra XI e XIII secolo. Proposte di interpretazioni istituzionali", in Rivista dell'Istituto di Storia dell'Europa Mediterranea, no. 5, 2010.
- Manconi Francesco, La Sardegna al tempo degli Asburgo, Il Maestrale, Nuoro, 2010, ISBN 9788864290102.
- Manconi Francesco, Una piccola provincia di un grande impero, CUEC, Cagliari, 2012, ISBN 8884677882.
- Mastino Attilio, Storia della Sardegna Antica, Il Maestrale, Nuoro, 2005, ISBN 9788889801635.
- Meloni Piero, La Sardegna Romana, Chiarella, Sassari, 1980.
- Motzo Bachisio Raimondo, Studi sui bizantini in Sardegna e sull'agiografia sarda, Deputazione di Storia Patria della Sardegna, Cagliari, 1987.
- Ortu Gian Giacomo, La Sardegna dei Giudici, Il Maestrale, Nuoro, 2005, ISBN 9788889801024.
- Paulis Giulio, Lingua e cultura nella Sardegna bizantina: testimonianze linguistiche dell'influsso greco, Sassari, L'Asfodelo, 1983.
- Spanu Luigi, Cagliari nel seicento, Edizioni Castello, Cagliari, 1999.
- Zedda Corrado and Pinna Raimondo, "La nascita dei Giudicati. Proposta per lo scioglimento di un enigma storiografico", in Archivio Storico Giuridico di Sassari, second series, no. 12, 2007.
