= Kingdom of Sardinia =

State in Southern Europe from 1324 to 1861

Kingdom of Sardinia Regnum Sardiniæ (Latin) Regne de Sardenya (Catalan) Reino de Cerdeña (Spanish) Rennu de Sardigna (Sardinian) Regno di Sardegna (Italian)
- 1297–1847
- Top: Flag during the Aragonese and Spanish periods, and again c. 1324–1720, longest use Bottom: Flag (1816–1848) during the union with Piedmont–Savoy Coat of arms Aragonese-Spanish periods Savoyard periods
- Motto: FERT (Motto for the House of Savoy)
- Anthem: S'hymnu sardu nationale "The Sardinian National Anthem"
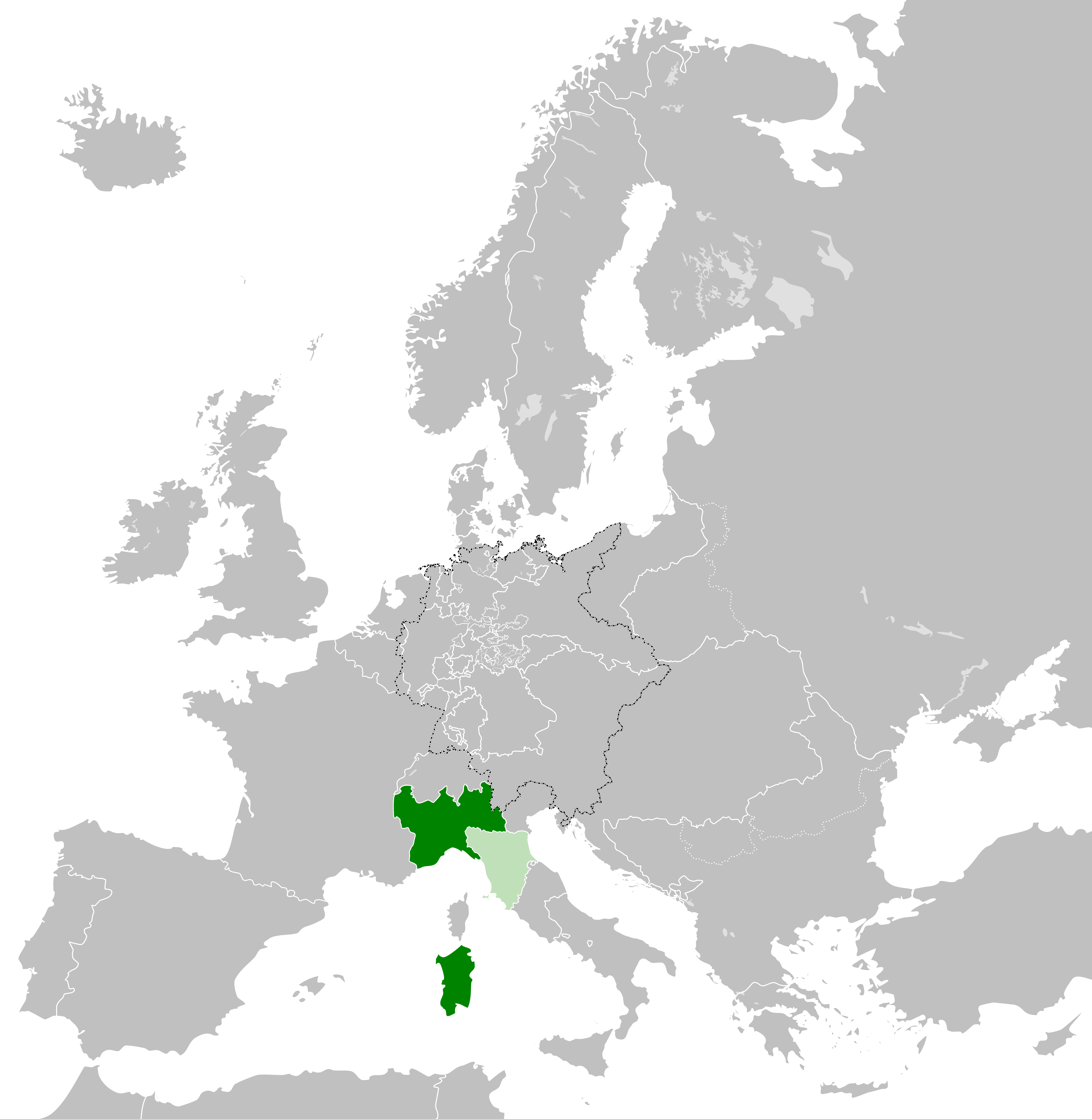
- Kingdom of Sardinia–Piedmont in 1859 including conquest of Lombardy; client state in light green
- Status: Dependent state of; Aragon (1324–1708); Austria (1708–1717); Spain (1717–1720); Savoy (1720–1861)
- Capital: Cagliari
- Common languages: Catalan and Spanish (official, pre-1720), French (official, pre-1760), Italian (official, 1760); Sardinian, Corsican, Piedmontese, Ligurian, Occitan, and Arpitan
- Religion: Roman Catholicism (official, 1848)
- Demonym: Sardinian
- Government: Absolute monarchy (1324–1849); Parliamentary constitutional monarchy (1849–1861)
- King
  - 1324–1327 (first): James II
  - 1849–1861 (last): Victor Emmanuel II
- Prime Minister
  - 1848 (first): Cesare Balbo
  - 1860–1861 (last): Camillo Benso
- Legislature: Parliament (1848–1861)
  - Upper house: Subalpine Senate (1848–1861)
  - Lower house: Chamber of Deputies (1848–1861)
- Historical era: Middle Ages, early modern, late modern
  - Papal investiture: 1297
  - Aragonese conquest: 1324
  - Imperial Habsburg Rule: 1708
  - Spanish reconquest: 1717
  - Became part of Savoy: 1720
  - Perfect Fusion: 1848
  - Loss of Savoy and Nice: 1860
  - Proclamation of the Kingdom of Italy: 17 March 1847

Area
  - 1852: 29,098 sq mi (75,360 km^{2})

Population
  - 1852: 4,650,368
- Currency: Cagliarese (1720–1813); Sardinian scudo (1755–1816); Piedmontese scudo (1755–1816); French franc (1800–1814); Sardinian lira (1816–1861)
Preceded by
Judicate of Arborea
Republic of Pisa
Republic of Sassari
Holy Roman Empire
Duchy of Savoy
Republic of Genoa
Duchy of Genoa
Crown of Aragon
Succeeded by
Kingdom of Sardinia (1720-1861)
- Today part of: Italy; France; Monaco

The Kingdom of Sardinia, also referred to as the Kingdom of Sardinia and Corsica among other names, (Note: The name of the state was originally Regnum Sardiniae or Regnum Sardiniae et Corsicae (when the kingdom was still considered to include Corsica) in Latin. It is Regno di Sardegna in Italian, Rennu de Sardigna [ˈrenːu ðɛ zaɾˈdiɲːa] in Sardinian, Regn ëd Sardëgna [ˈrɛɲ ət sarˈdəɲːa] in Piedmontese, Regnu di Sardegna in Corsican, Reino de Cerdeña in Spanish, Regne de Sardenya [ˈrɛŋnə ðə səɾˈðɛɲə] in Catalan, and Royaume de Sardaigne in French. Despite this, every king of Sardinia continued to retain the nominal title of Rex Corsicae (King of Corsica). The kingdom was initially called Regnum Sardiniae et Corsicae, in that it was originally meant to also include the neighbouring island of Corsica, until its status as a Genoese land was eventually acknowledged by Ferdinand II of Aragon, who dropped the last original bit mentioning Corsica in 1479. Other names used to refer to the composite state during the ruling of the House of Savoy from 1720 to 1861 (the Piedmontese part of the kingdom is referred to by historians as the Savoyard state, which represents the lands owned by the House of Savoy) include informal ones like Kingdom of Sardinia–Piedmont, Kingdom of Piedmont–Sardinia, Sardinia–Piedmont, and Piedmont–Sardinia, and the erroneous Kingdom of Piedmont.) was a kingdom in Southern Europe from the late 13th until the mid-19th century. The kingdom's history can be divided into two distinct phases, one as part of the Aragonese and Spanish crowns (1324–1720) and one as a possession of the Savoyard state (1720–1861).

The kingdom was a member of the Council of Aragon and initially consisted of the islands of Corsica and Sardinia, sovereignty over both of which was claimed by the papacy, which granted them as a fief, the Regnum Sardiniae et Corsicae (Kingdom of Sardinia and Corsica), to King James II of Aragon in 1297. Beginning in 1324, James and his successors conquered the island of Sardinia and established de facto their de jure authority. In 1420, after the Sardinian–Aragonese war, the last competing claim to the island was bought out. After the union of the crowns of Aragon and Castile, Sardinia became a part of the burgeoning Spanish Empire.

In 1720, the island and its kingdom were ceded by the Habsburg and Bourbon claimants from the Spanish throne to the Duke of Savoy, Victor Amadeus II. The Savoyards united it with their historical possessions on the Italian mainland, and the kingdom came to be progressively identified with the mainland states, which included, besides Savoy and Aosta, dynastic possessions like the Principality of Piedmont and the County of Nice. The formal name of this composite state was the "States of His Majesty the King of Sardinia", and it was and is referred to as either Sardinia–Piedmont, Piedmont–Sardinia, or erroneously the Kingdom of Piedmont, since the island of Sardinia had always been of secondary importance to the monarchy. Under Savoyard rule, the kingdom's government, ruling class, cultural models, and centre of population were entirely situated in the mainland. Therefore, while the capital of the island of Sardinia and the seat of its viceroys had always been de jure Cagliari, it was the Piedmontese city of Turin, the capital of Savoy since the mid 16th century, which was the de facto seat of power. This situation would be conferred official status with the Perfect Fusion of 1847, when all the kingdom's governmental institutions would be centralized in Turin.

When the mainland domains of the House of Savoy were occupied and eventually annexed by Napoleonic France, the king of Sardinia temporarily resided on the island for the first time in Sardinia's history under Savoyard rule. The Congress of Vienna (1814–1815), which restructured Europe after Napoleon's defeat, returned to Savoy its mainland possessions and augmented them with Liguria, taken from the Republic of Genoa. Following Geneva's accession to Switzerland, the Treaty of Turin (1816) transferred Carouge and adjacent areas to the newly created Swiss Canton of Geneva. In 1847–1848, through an act of union analogous to the one between Great Britain and Ireland, the various Savoyard states were unified under one legal system with their capital in Turin, and granted a constitution, the Statuto Albertino.

By the time of the Crimean War in 1853, the Savoyards had built the kingdom into a strong power. There followed the annexation of Lombardy (1859), the central Italian states and the Two Sicilies (1860), Venetia (1866), and the Papal States (1870). On 17 March 1861, to more accurately reflect its new geographic, cultural and political extent, the Kingdom of Sardinia changed its name to the Kingdom of Italy, and its capital was eventually moved first to Florence and then to Rome. The Savoy-led Kingdom of Sardinia was thus the legal predecessor state of the Kingdom of Italy, which in turn is the predecessor of the present-day Italian Republic.

== Early history ==
In 238 BC Sardinia became, along with Corsica, a province of the Roman Empire. The Romans ruled the island until the middle of the 5th century when it was occupied by the Vandals, who had also settled in the Maghreb. In 534 AD it was reconquered by the Eastern Roman (Byzantine) Empire. It remained a Byzantine province until the Arab conquest of Sicily in the 9th century. After, communications with Constantinople became very difficult, and powerful families of the island assumed control of the land.

=== Resisting Zaragozan Muslims ===
Facing Zaragozan Muslims' attempts to sack and conquer, while having almost no outside help, Sardinia used the principle of translatio imperii ("transfer of rule"), and continued to organize itself along the ancient Roman and Byzantine model. The island was not the personal property of the ruler and of his family, as was then the dominant practice in western Europe, but rather a separate entity and during the Byzantine Empire, a monarchical republic, as it had been since Roman times. Information about the Sardinian political situation in the following centuries is scarce. Due to Zaragozan attacks, in the 9th century Tharros was abandoned in favor of Oristano, after more than 1800 years of occupation; Caralis, Porto Torres, and numerous other coastal centres suffered the same fate.

=== Taifa of Denia invasions ===
There is a record of another massive Denian Muslims sea attack in 1015–16 from the Balearics, commanded by Mujāhid al-ʿĀmirī the Slavic Muslim Emir of Taifa of Denia (Latinized as Museto). The Denian first attempt to invade the island was stopped by the Judicates with the support of the fleets of the maritime republics of Pisa and Genoa. Pope Benedict VIII also requested aid from the two maritime republics in the struggle against the Denian Muslims.

After the East–West Schism, Rome made many efforts to restore Latinity to the Sardinian church, politics and society, and to finally reunify the island under one Catholic ruler, as it had been for all of southern Italy, when the Byzantines had been driven away by Catholic Normans. Even the title of "Judge" was a Byzantine reminder of the Greek church and state, in times of harsh relations between eastern and western churches (Massacre of the Latins, 1182, Siege of Constantinople (1204), Recapture of Constantinople, 1261).

Before the Kingdom of Sardinia and Corsica, the archons (Ancient Greek: ἄρχοντες), or judices in Latin, who reigned in the island from the 9th or 10th century until the beginning of the 11th century, can be considered real kings of all Sardinia (Κύριε βοήθε ιοῦ δούλου σου Tουρκοτουρίου ἅρχωντοσ Σαρδινίας καί τής δούλης σου Γετιτ), even though nominal vassals of the Byzantine emperors. Of these sovereigns, only two names are known: Turcoturiu and Salusiu (Tουρκοτουρίου βασιλικοῦ πρωτοσπαθαρίου (καὶ Σαλουσίου των εὐγενεστάτων ἀρχόντων), who probably ruled in the 10th century. The archons still wrote in Greek or Latin, but one of the oldest documents left of the Judicate of Cagliari (the Carta Volgare), issued by Torchitorio I de Lacon-Gunale in 1070, was already written in the Romance Sardinian language, albeit with the Greek alphabet.

The realm was divided into four small kingdoms, the Judicates of Cagliari, Arborea, Gallura and Logudoro, perfectly organized as was the previous realm, but was now under the influence of the papacy, which claimed sovereignty over the entire island, and in particular of the Italian states of Genoa and Pisa, that through alliances with the "judges" (the local rulers), secured their political and economic zones of influence. While Genoa was mostly, but not always, in the north and west regions of Sardinia, that is, in the Judicates of Gallura and Logudoro; Pisa was mostly, but not always, in the south and east, in the Judicates of Cagliari and Arborea. That was the cause of conflicts leading to a long war between the Judges, who regarded themselves as kings fighting against rebellious nobles.

=== Resisting Kingdom of Aragon ===
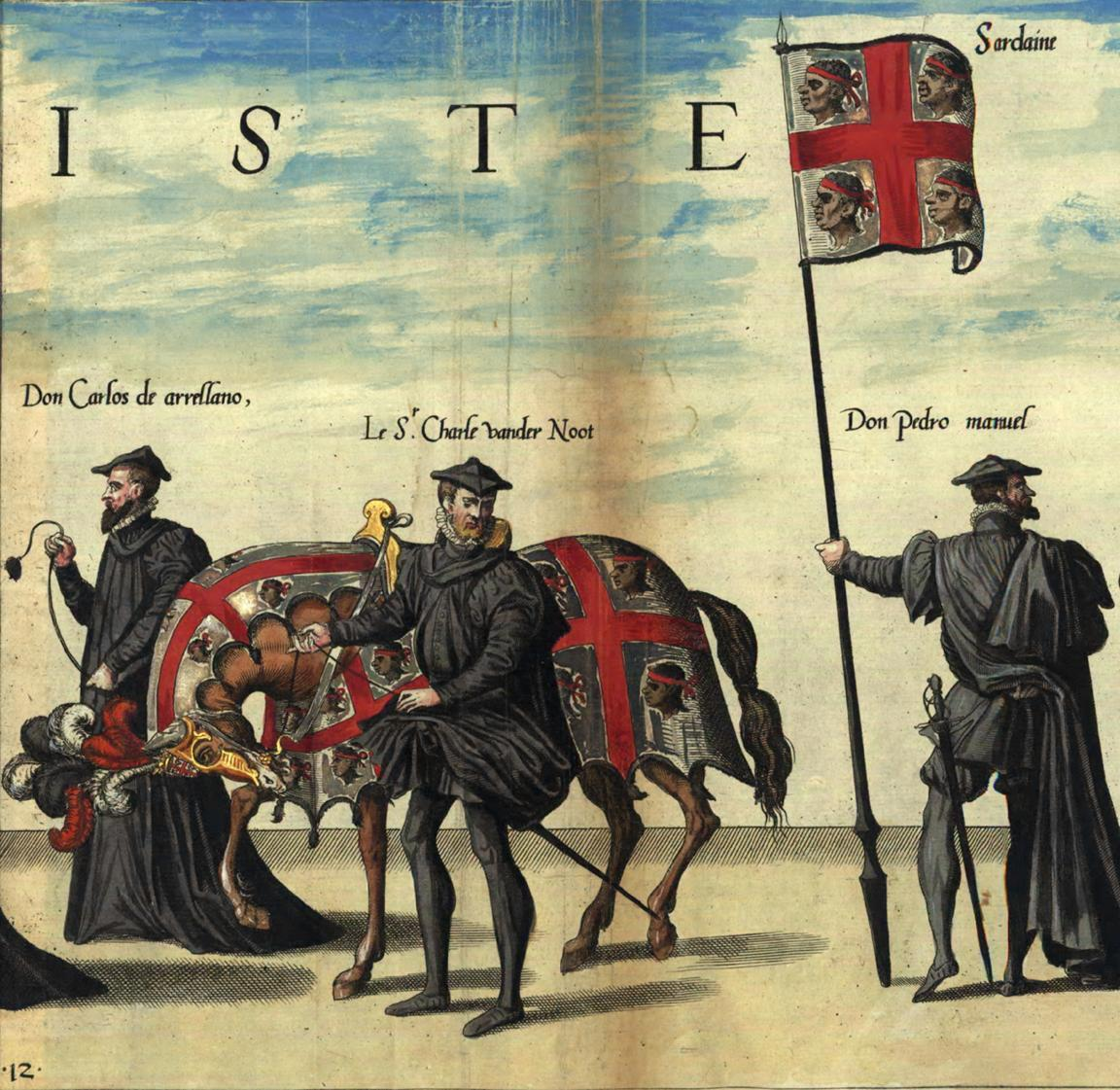
The flag of the Kingdom of Sardinia at the funeral ceremony of Charles V

Later, the title of King of Sardinia was granted by the Emperor of the Holy Roman Empire to Barisone II of Arborea, and subsequently also to Enzio of Sardinia. The first could not reunify the island under his rule, despite years of war against the other Sardinian judges, and he finally concluded a peace treaty with them in 1172. The second did not have the opportunity. Invested with the title from his father, Emperor Frederick II in 1239, he was soon recalled by his parent and appointed Imperial Vicar for Italy. He died in 1272 without direct recognized heirs after a detention of 23 years in a prison in Bologna.

The Kingdom of Sardinia and Corsica, later only the Kingdom of Sardinia from 1460, was a state whose king was the King of Aragon, who started to conquer it in 1324, gained full control in 1410, and directly ruled it until 1460. In that year it was incorporated into a sort of confederation of states, each with its own institutions, called the Crown of Aragon, and united only in the person of the king. The Crown of Aragon was made by a council of representatives of the various states and grew in importance for the main purpose of separating the legacy of Ferdinand II of Aragon from that of Isabella I of Castile when they married in 1469.

The idea of the kingdom was created in 1297 by Pope Boniface VIII, as a hypothetical entity created for James II of Aragon under a secret clause in the Treaty of Anagni. This was an inducement to join in the effort to restore Sicily, then under the rule of James's brother Frederick III of Sicily, to the Angevin dynasty over the oppositions of the Sicilians. The two islands proposed for this new kingdom were occupied by other states and fiefs at the time. In Sardinia, three of the four states that had succeeded Byzantine imperial rule in the 9th century had passed through marriage and partition under the direct or indirect control of Pisa and Genoa in the 40 years preceding the Treaty of Anagni. Genoa had also ruled Corsica since conquering the island nearly two centuries before (c. 1133).

There were other reasons beside this papal decision: it was the final successful result of the long fight against the Ghibelline (pro-imperial) city of Pisa and the Holy Roman Empire itself. Furthermore, Sardinia was then under the control of the very Catholic kings of Aragon, and the last result of rapprochement of the island to Rome. The Sardinian church had never been under the control of the Ecumenical Patriarchate of Constantinople; it was an autonomous province loyal to Rome and belonging to the Latin Church, but during the Byzantine period became influenced by Byzantine liturgy and culture.

== Aragonese and Spanish kingdom ==
=== Foundation of the Kingdom of Sardinia ===
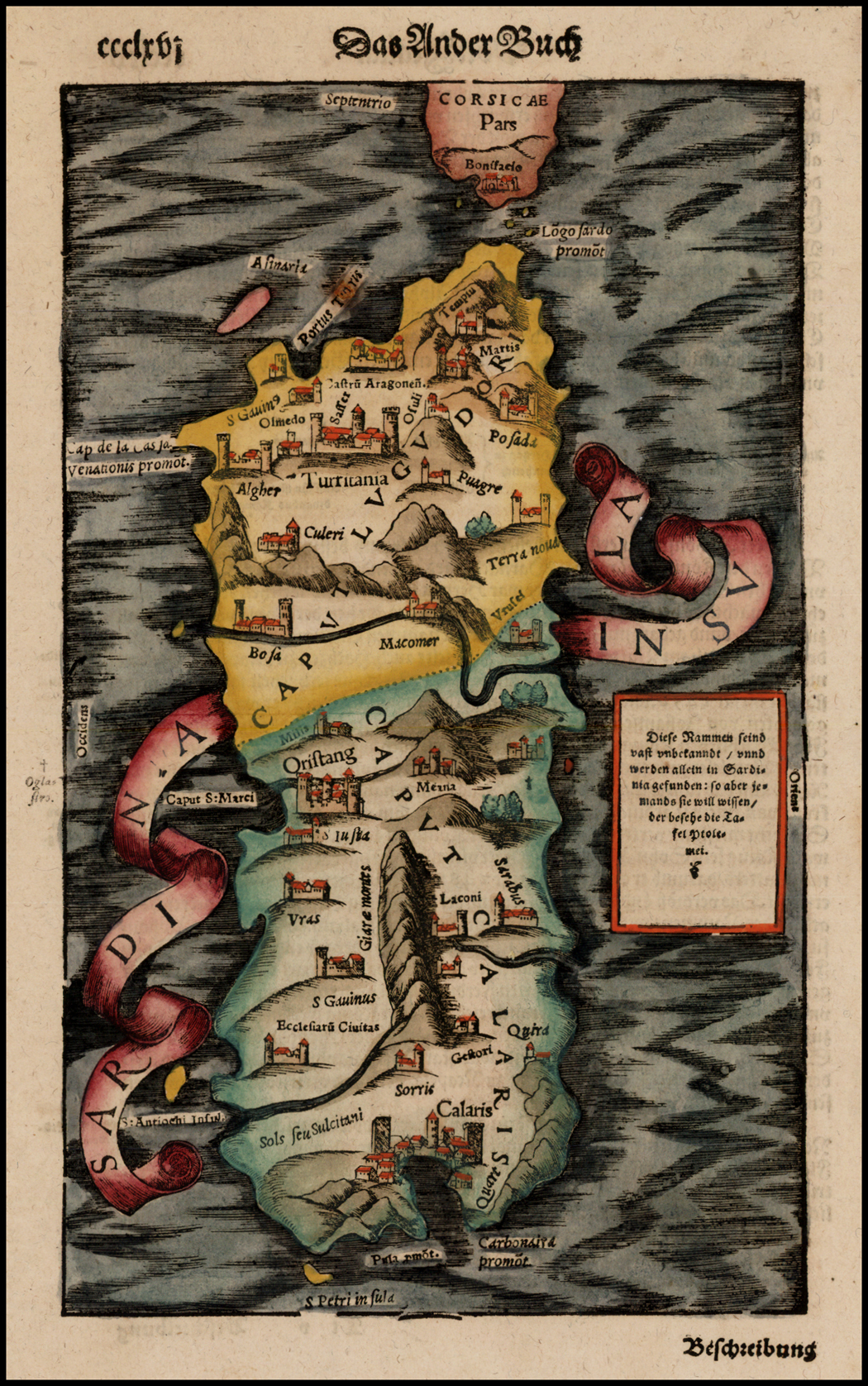
The Kingdom of Sardinia in a 16th-century map

In 1297, Pope Boniface VIII, intervening between the Houses of Anjou and Aragon, established on paper a Regnum Sardiniae et Corsicae that would be a fief of the papacy. Then, ignoring the indigenous states which already existed, the Pope offered his newly created fief to James II of Aragon, promising him papal support should he wish to conquer Pisan Sardinia in exchange for Sicily. In 1323, James II formed an alliance with Hugh II of Arborea and, following a military campaign which lasted a year or so, occupied the Pisan territories of Cagliari and Gallura along with the city of Sassari, claiming the territory as the Kingdom of Sardinia and Corsica.

In 1353, Arborea waged war on Aragon. The Crown of Aragon did not reduce the last of the judicates (indigenous kingdoms of Sardinia) until 1420. The Kingdom of Sardinia and Corsica retained its separate character as part of the Crown of Aragon and was not merely incorporated into the Kingdom of Aragon. At the time of his struggles with Arborea, Peter IV of Aragon granted an autonomous legislature to the kingdom and its legal traditions. The kingdom was governed in the king's name by a viceroy. In 1420, Alfonso V of Aragon, king of Sicily and heir to Aragon, bought the remaining territories for 100,000 gold florins of the Judicate of Arborea in the 1420 from the last judge, William III of Narbonne, and the Kingdom of Sardinia extended throughout the island, except for the city of Castelsardo (at that time called Casteldoria or Castelgenovese) that was stolen from the Doria in 1448, and renamed Castillo Aragonés (Aragonese Castle).

Corsica, which had never been conquered, was dropped from the formal title and Sardinia passed with the Crown of Aragon to a united Spain. The defeat of the local kingdoms, communes and signorie, the firm Aragonese (later Spanish) rule, the introduction of a sterile feudalism, as well as the discovery of the Americas, provoked an unstoppable decline of the Kingdom of Sardinia. A short period of uprisings occurred under the local noble Leonardo Alagon, marquess of Oristano, who defended his territories against Viceroy Nicolò Carroz and managed to defeat the viceroy's army in the 1470s, but was later crushed at the Battle of Macomer in 1478, ending any further revolts in the island. The unceasing attacks from north African pirates and a series of plagues (in 1582, 1652 and 1655) further worsened the situation.

=== Aragonese conquest of Sardinia ===
Although the Kingdom of Sardinia and Corsica could be said to have started as a questionable and extraordinary de jure state in 1297, its de facto existence began in 1324 when, called by their allies of the Judicate of Arborea in the course of war with the Republic of Pisa, James II seized the Pisan territories in the former states of Cagliari and Gallura and asserted his papally-approved title. In 1347, Aragon made war on landlords of the Doria House and the Malaspina House, who were citizens of the Republic of Genoa, which controlled most of the lands of the former Logudoro state in north-western Sardinia, including the city of Alghero and the semiautonomous Republic of Sassari, and added them to its direct domains.

The Judicate of Arborea, the only Sardinian state that remained independent of foreign domination, proved far more difficult to subdue. Threatened by the Aragonese claims of suzerainty and consolidation of the rest of the island, in 1353 Arborea, under the leadership of Marianus IV, started the conquest of the remaining Sardinian territories, which formed the Kingdom of Sardinia. In 1368 an Arborean offensive succeeded in nearly driving the Aragonese from the island, reducing the Kingdom of Sardinia and Corsica to just the port cities of Cagliari and Alghero, and incorporating everything else into their own kingdom.

A peace treaty returned the Aragonese their previous possessions in 1388 but tensions continued. In 1382, the Arborean army led by Brancaleone Doria again swept most of the island into Arborean rule. This situation lasted until 1409 when the army of the Judicate of Arborea suffered a heavy defeat by the Aragonese army in the Battle of Sanluri. After the sale of the remaining territories for 100,000 gold florins to the Judicate of Arborea in 1420, the Kingdom of Sardinia extended throughout the island, except for the city of Castelsardo (at that time called Casteldoria or Castelgenovese), which had been stolen from the Doria in 1448. The subduing of Sardinia having taken a century, Corsica, which had never been wrested from the Genoese, was dropped from the formal title of the kingdom.

=== Spanish Sardinia ===
Under the Crown of Aragon Sardinia continued to be governed as a semi-independent kingdom, retaining its own parliament and a Viceroy governing the island on the king's behalf. This arrangement continued after the personal union of the crowns of Castile and Aragon to form Spain under the Habsburg dynasty. During this time, the island became a target for Barbary pirates due to the frequent wars between Spain and the Ottoman Empire. From the 1570s onward a series of towers, known today as the Spanish Towers, were built around the island's coast to guard against pirate raids.

== Savoyard period ==
=== Exchange of Sardinia for Sicily ===
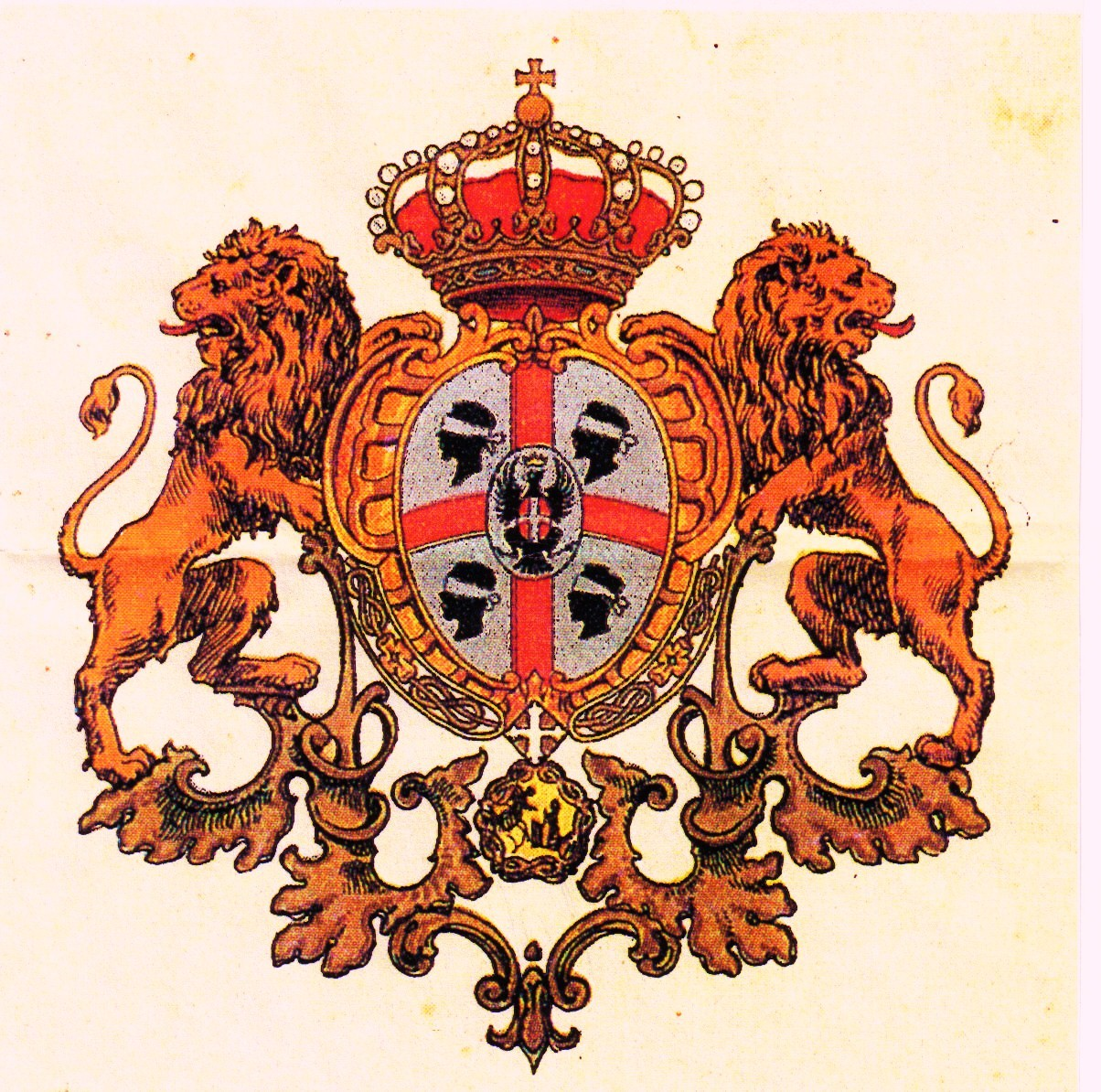
19th-century coat of arms of the Kingdom of Sardinia under the Savoy dynasty

The Spanish domination of Sardinia ended at the beginning of the 18th century, as a result of the War of the Spanish Succession. By the Treaty of Utrecht (1713), Spain's European empire was divided: the House of Savoy received Sicily and parts of the Duchy of Milan, while Charles VI (the Holy Roman Emperor and Archduke of Austria), received the Spanish Netherlands, the Kingdom of Naples, Sardinia, and the bulk of the Duchy of Milan.

During the War of the Quadruple Alliance, Victor Amadeus II, Duke of Savoy, Prince of Piedmont, and by now also King of Sicily, had to agree to yield Sicily to the Austrian Habsburgs and receive Sardinia in exchange. The exchange was formally ratified in the Treaty of The Hague of 17 February 1720. Because the Kingdom of Sardinia had existed since the 14th century, the exchange allowed Victor Amadeus to retain the title of king in spite of the loss of Sicily. From 1720 to 1798, when Napoleon invaded Italy, the de facto government resided in Turin; Cagliari, which had been the capital of the Kingdom of Sardinia since 1324, returned to be the de facto government during the Savoy exile from 1798 to 1814. When Napoleon was first resided, the de facto government returned to Turin but did not officially became the capital of the Kingdom of Sardinia until 1847.

Victor Amadeus initially resisted the exchange of Sardinia for Sicilia in 1720. Until 1723, he continued to style himself King of Sicily rather than King of Sardinia. The state took the official title of Kingdom of Sardinia, Cyprus, and Jerusalem, as the House of Savoy still claimed the thrones of Cyprus and Jerusalem, although both had long been under Ottoman rule. In 1767–1769, Charles Emmanuel III annexed the Maddalena archipelago in the Strait of Bonifacio from the Republic of Genoa and claimed it as part of Sardinia, which became a part of the Sardinian region since then.

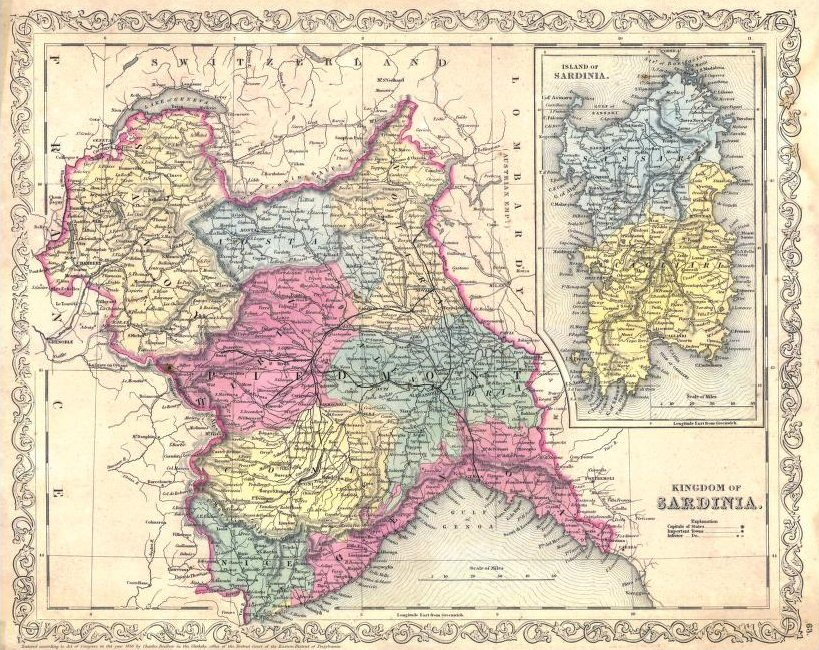
A map of the Kingdom of Sardinia in 1856 after the Perfect Fusion merged all its provinces into a single jurisdiction.

Since the Iberian period in Sardinia, common languages included Sardinian, Corsican, Catalan, and Spanish. Other languages included French, Piedmontese, Ligurian, Occitan, and Arpitan. During the Savoyard period as a composite state, Italian, which alongside French had already been made official in the peninsula since the 16th century via the Rivoli Edict, was introduced to Sardinia in 1760. With the Regio Biglietto of 25 July 1760, Italian was made a priority over French in Piedmont. The Kingdom of Sardinia's attempt of promotion of a unitary language was incisive, and also the replacement of Spanish with Italian has been described as a "revolution of ideas". Since French was still in use in some provinces, the Statuto Albertino (1848) authorised the use of French.

=== Napoleonic Wars and the Congress of Vienna ===
In 1792, the Kingdom of Sardinia and the other states of the Savoy Crown joined the First Coalition against the French First Republic, but was beaten in 1796 by Napoleon and forced to conclude the disadvantageous Treaty of Paris (1796), giving the French army free passage through Piedmont. On 6 December 1798 Joubert occupied Turin and forced Charles Emmanuel IV to abdicate and leave for the island of Sardinia. The provisionary government voted to unite Piedmont with France. In 1799, the Austro-Russians briefly occupied the city, but with the Battle of Marengo (1800), the French regained control. The island of Sardinia stayed out of the reach of the French for the rest of the war and was, for the first time in centuries governed directly by its king instead of a viceroy.

In 1814, the Crown of Savoy enlarged its territories with the addition of the former Republic of Genoa, now a duchy, and it served as a buffer state against France. This was confirmed by the Congress of Vienna, which returned the region of Savoy to its borders after it had been annexed by France in 1792. By the Treaty of Stupinigi (1817), the Kingdom of Sardinia extended its protectorate over the Principality of Monaco. In 1821, the Kingdom of Sardinia's reported population amounted to 3,974,500.

In the reaction after Napoleon, the country was ruled by the conservative monarchs Victor Emmanuel I (1802–1821), Charles Felix (1821–1831), and Charles Albert (1831–1849), who fought at the head of a contingent of his own troops at the Battle of Trocadero, which set the reactionary Ferdinand VII on the Spanish throne. Victor Emmanuel I disbanded the entire Code Napoléon and returned the lands and power to the nobility and the Church. This reactionary policy went as far as discouraging the use of roads built by the French. These changes typified Sardinia.

The Kingdom of Sardinia industrialized from 1830 onward. A constitution, the Statuto Albertino, was enacted during the Revolutions of 1848 under liberal pressure. In addition to make Turin its official capital, the Statuto Albertino made Roman Catholicism "the only State religion". Earlier in 1847, the island of Sardinia, a Piedmontese dependency for more than a century, lost its own residual autonomy to the peninsula through the Perfect Fusion issued by Charles Albert. As a result, the kingdom's fundamental institutions were deeply transformed, assuming the shape of a constitutional and centralized monarchy on the French model; under the same pressure, Charles Albert declared war on Austria. After initial success, the war took a turn for the worse and Charles Albert was defeated by Marshal Radetzky at the Battle of Custozza (1848).

=== Savoyard struggle for the Italian unification ===
Camillo Benso, Count of Cavour

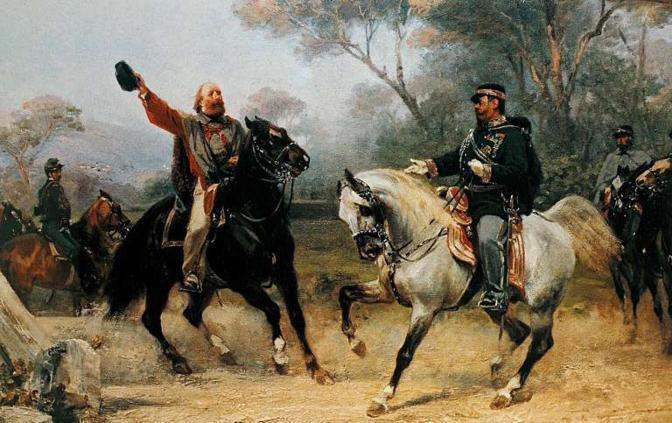
King Victor Emmanuel II meets Giuseppe Garibaldi in Teano, 26 October 1860.

Like all the various duchies and city-states on the Apennine Peninsula and associated islands, the Kingdom of Sardinia was troubled with political instability under alternating governments. After a short and disastrous renewal of the war with Austria in 1849, Charles Albert abdicated on 23 March 1849 in favour of his son Victor Emmanuel II. In 1852, a liberal ministry under Count Camillo Benso di Cavour was installed and the Kingdom of Sardinia became the engine driving Italian unification. The Kingdom of Sardinia took part in the Crimean War, allied with the Ottoman Empire, Britain, and France, and fighting against Russia.

In 1859, France sided with the Kingdom of Sardinia in a war against Austria, the Austro-Sardinian War. Napoleon III did not keep his promises to Cavour to fight until all of the Kingdom of Lombardy–Venetia had been conquered. Following the bloody battles of Magenta and Solferino, both French victories, Napoleon thought the war too costly to continue and made a separate peace behind Cavour's back in which only Lombardy would be ceded. Due to the Austrian government's refusal to cede any lands to the Kingdom of Sardinia, they agreed to cede Lombardy to Napoleon, who in turn then ceded the territory to the Kingdom of Sardinia to avoid "embarrassing" the defeated Austrians. Cavour angrily resigned from office when it became clear that Victor Emmanuel would accept this arrangement.

=== Garibaldi and the Thousand ===
On 5 March 1860, Piacenza, Parma, Tuscany, Modena, and Romagna voted in referendums to join the Kingdom of Sardinia. This alarmed Napoleon III, who feared a strong Savoyard state on his south-eastern border and he insisted that if the Kingdom of Sardinia were to keep the new acquisitions they would have to cede Savoy and Nice to France. This was done through the Treaty of Turin, which also called for referendums to confirm the annexation. Subsequently, somewhat controversial referendums showed over 99.5% majorities in both areas in favour of joining France.

In 1860, Giuseppe Garibaldi started his campaign to conquer the southern Apennines in the name of the Kingdom of Sardinia. The Thousand quickly toppled the Kingdom of the Two Sicilies, which was the largest of the states in the region, stretching from Abruzzo and Naples on the mainland to Messina and Palermo on Sicily. He then marched to Gaeta in the central peninsula. Cavour was satisfied with the unification while Garibaldi, who was too revolutionary for the king and his prime minister, also wanted to conquer Rome.

Garibaldi was disappointed in this development, as well as in the loss of his home province, Nice, to France. He also failed to fulfill the promises that had gained him popular and military support by the Sicilians: that the new nation would be a republic, not a kingdom, and that the Sicilians would see great economic gains after unification. The former did not come to pass until 1946.

=== Towards the Kingdom of Italy ===
On 17 March 1861, law no. 4671 of the Sardinian Parliament proclaimed the Kingdom of Italy, so ratifying the annexations of all other Apennine states, plus Sicily, to the Kingdom of Sardinia. The institutions and laws of the kingdom were quickly extended to all of Italy, abolishing the administrations of the other regions. Piedmont became the most dominant and wealthiest region in Italy and the capital of Piedmont, Turin, remained the Italian capital until 1865, when the capital was moved to Florence. As part of the Brigandage in the Two Sicilies, many revolts exploded throughout the peninsula, especially in southern Italy and on the island of Sicily, because of the perceived unfair treatment of the south by the Piedmontese ruling class. The House of Savoy ruled the Kingdom of Italy until 1946, when Italy was declared a republic by referendum. The result of the 1946 Italian institutional referendum was 54.3% in favor of a republic.

== Flags, royal standards, and coats of arms ==
When the Duchy of Savoy acquired the Kingdom of Sicily in 1713 and the Kingdom of Sardinia in 1723, the flag of Savoy became the flag of a naval power. This posed the problem that the same flag was already in use by the Knights of Malta. Because of this, the Savoyards modified their flag for use as a naval ensign in various ways, adding the letters FERT in the four cantons, or adding a blue border, or using a blue flag with the Savoy cross in one canton. Eventually, King Charles Albert of Savoy adopted from Revolutionary France the Italian tricolor, surmounted by the Savoyard shield, as his flag. This flag would later become the flag of the Kingdom of Italy, and the tricolor without the Savoyard escutcheon remains the flag of Italy.

Coats of arms

Middle Ages
(union with Aragon)

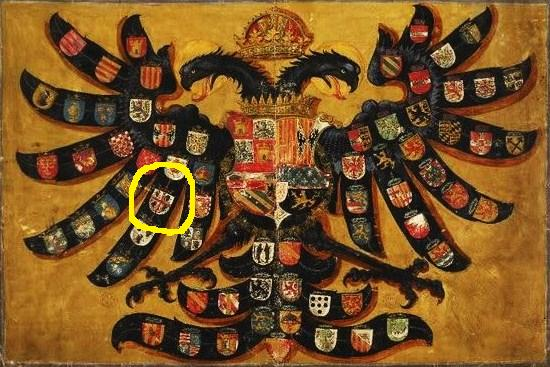
Imperial Eagle of Roman Holy Emperor Charles V with the four Moors of the Kingdom of Sardinia (16th century)

(1720–1815)

(1815–1831)

(1831–1848)

(1848–1861)
State flags

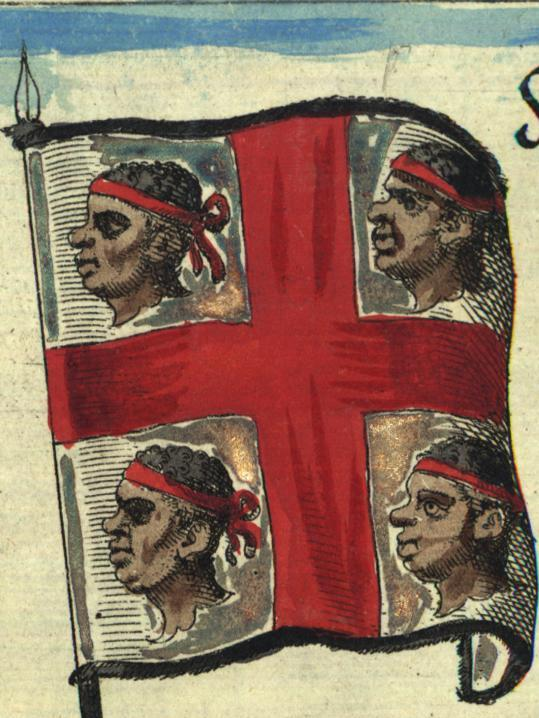
Flag of the Kingdom of Sardinia in 1568

Royal standard of the Savoyard kings of Sardinia of Savoy dynasty (1720–1848) and state flag of the Savoyard states (late 16th–late 18th century)

State flag and war ensign (1816–1848), civil flag crowned

State and war flag (1848–1851)

State flag and war ensign (1851–1861)
Other flags

Merchant Flag
(c. 1799–1802)

War ensign of the Royal Sardinian Navy (1785–1802)

Merchant flag
(1802–1814)

War ensign
(1802–1814)

Merchant flag and war ensign (1814–1816)

Civil flag and civil ensign (1816–1848)

War ensign of the Kingdom of Sardinia (1816–1848), aspect ratio 31:76

Civil and merchant flag (1851–1861), the Italian tricolore with the coat of arms of Savoy as an inescutcheon
Royal standards

(1848–1861) and Kingdom of Italy (1861–1880)

Crown Prince (1848–1861) and Crown Prince of the Kingdom of Italy (1861–1880)
- Sources:
  - Breschi, Roberto (2004). "Bandiere degli Stati preunitari italiani: Sardegna". Rbvex.it (in Italian). Archived from the original on 31 May 2019.
  - Ollé, Jaume (11 October 1998). "Kingdom of Sardinia – Part 1 (Italy)". Flags of the World. Archived from the original on 25 February 2017.
  - Ollé, Jaume (13 October 1998). "Kingdom of Sardinia – Part 2 (Italy)". Flags of the World. Archived from the original on 25 February 2017.
  - "Storia dello stemma". Regione Sardegna (in Italian). 2010. Archived from the original on 31 January 2023.

== Maps ==
=== Territorial evolution of Sardinia from 1324 to 1720 ===
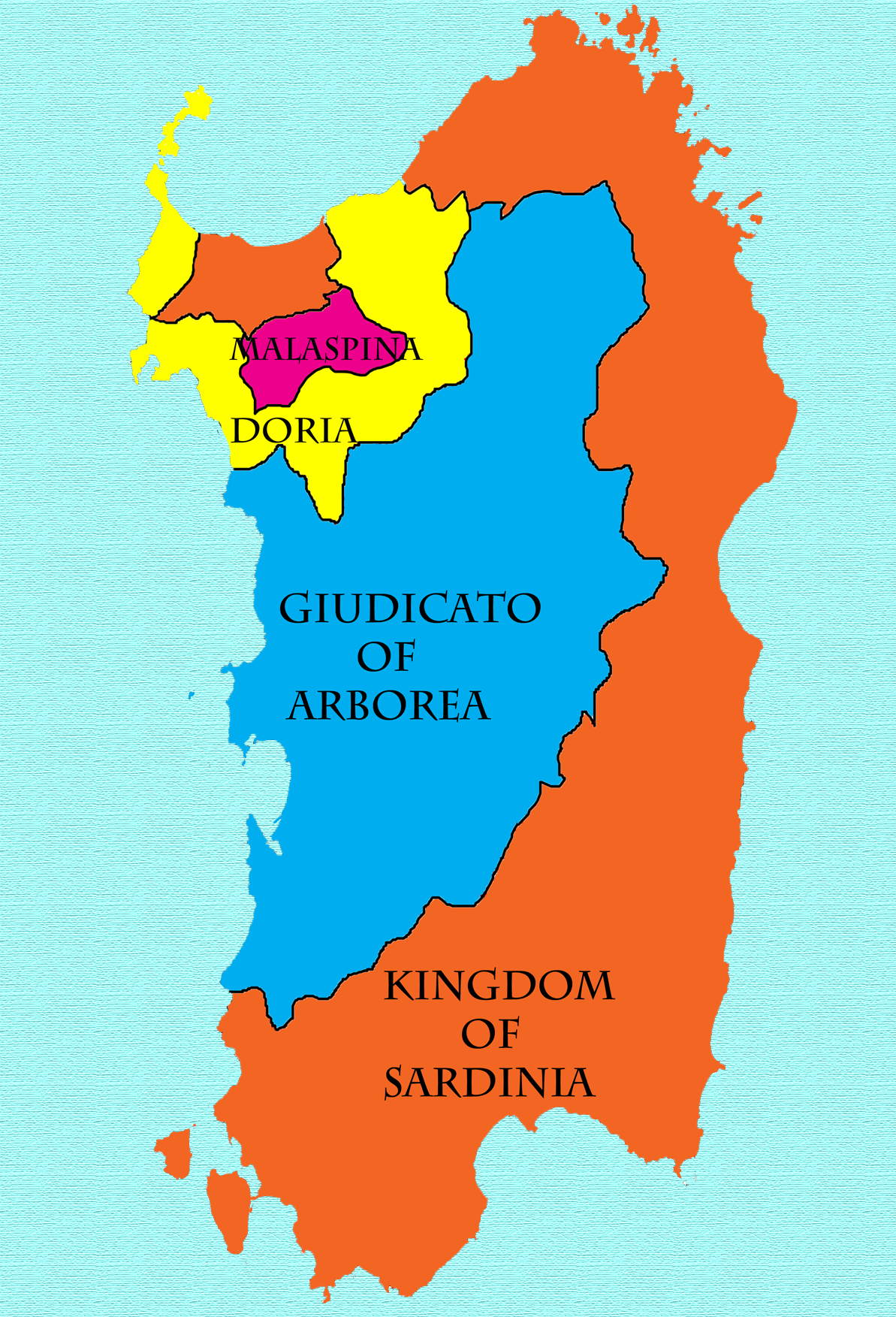
The political situation in Sardinia after 1324 when the Aragonese conquered the Pisan territories of Sardinia, which included the defunct Judicate of Cagliari and Gallura.

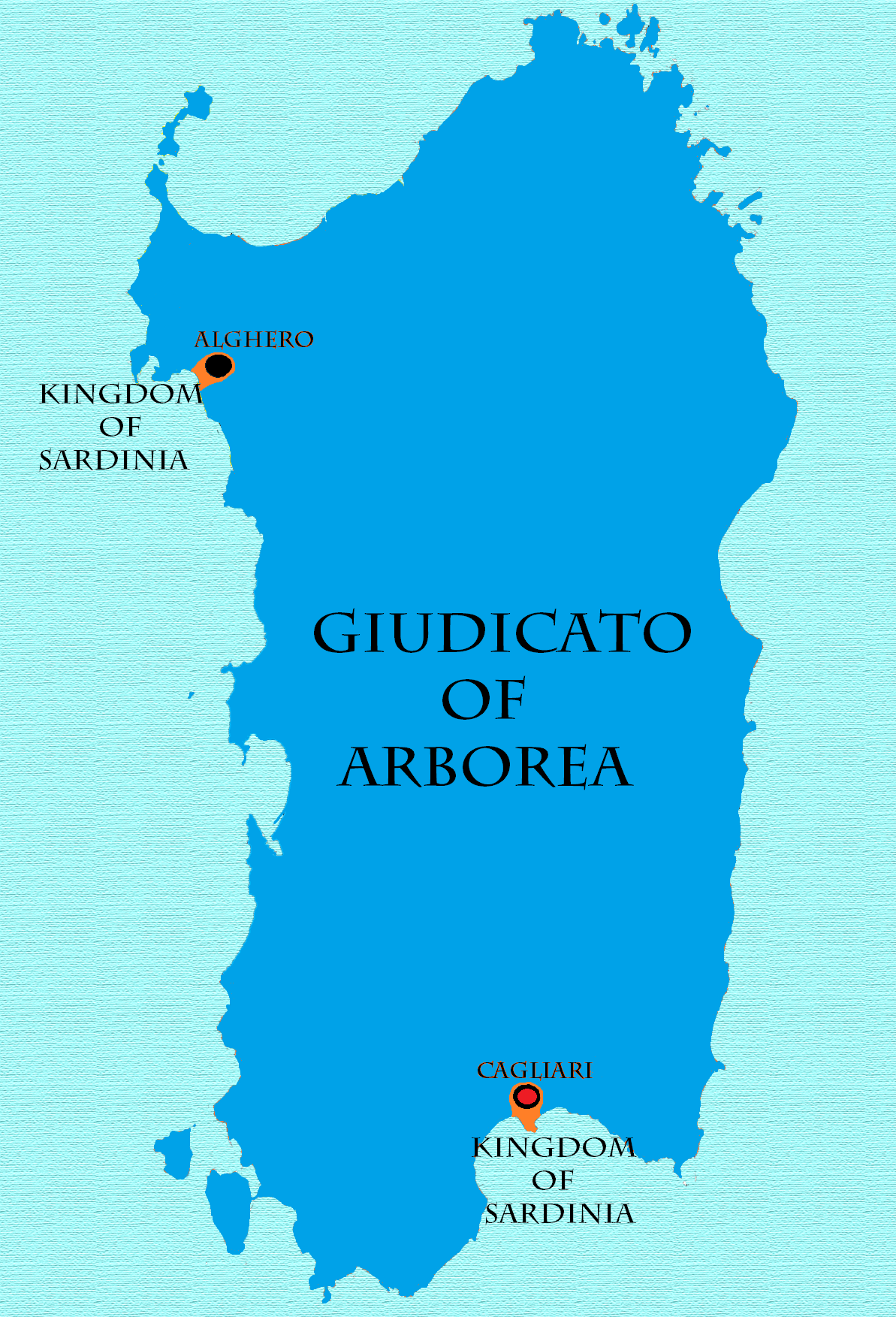
The Kingdom of Sardinia from 1368 to 1388 and 1392 to 1409, after the wars with Arborea, consisted of only the cities of Cagliari and Alghero.

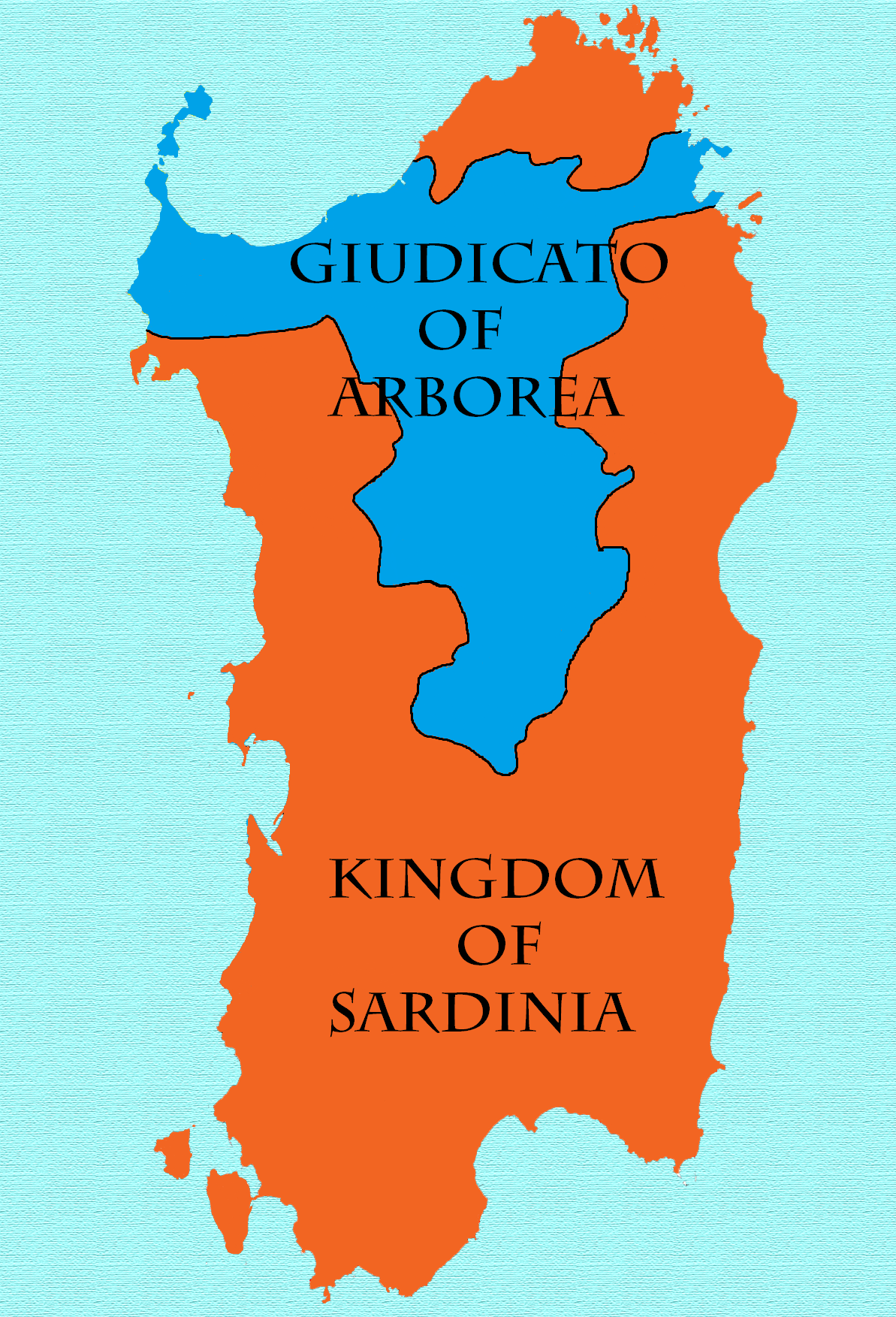
The Kingdom of Sardinia from 1410 to 1420, after the defeat of the Arborean Judicate in the Battle of Sanluri (1409)

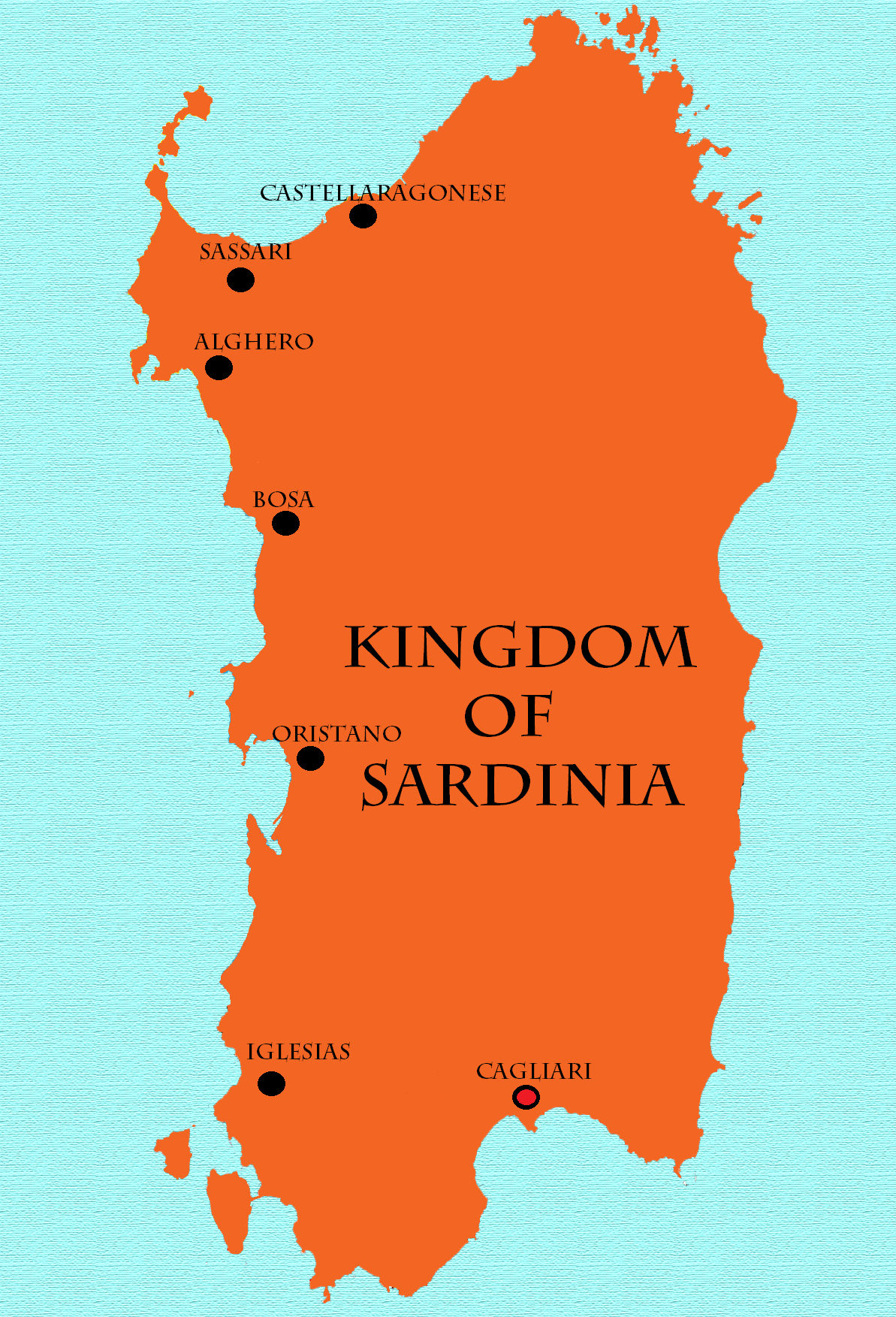
The Kingdom of Sardinia from 1448 to 1720; the Maddalena archipelago was conquered in 1767–1769.

=== Territorial evolution of Italy from 1796 to 1860 ===
1796

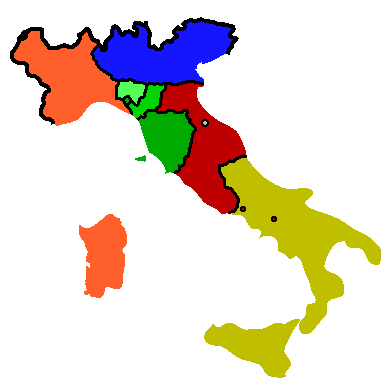
1859:
Kingdom of Sardinia
Kingdom Lombardy–Venetia
Duchies Parma–Modena-Tuscany
Papal States
Kingdom of the Two Sicilies

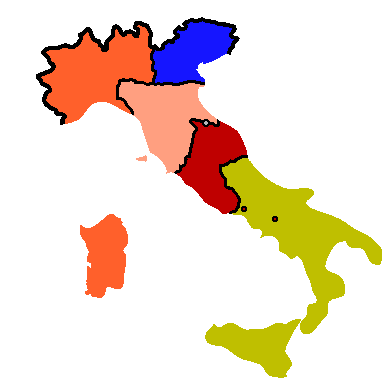
1860:
Kingdom of Sardinia
Kingdom Lombardy–Venetia
Papal States
Kingdom of the Two Sicilies
After the annexation of Lombardy, the Grand Duchy of Tuscany, the Emilian Duchies and Pope's Romagna

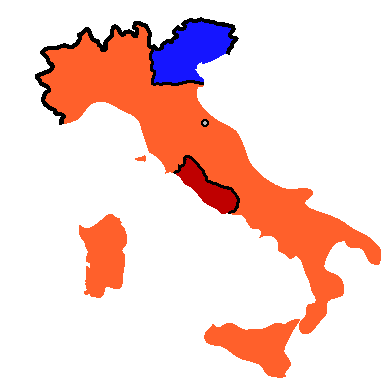
1861:
Kingdom of Sardinia
Kingdom Lombardy–Venetia
Papal States
After the Expedition of the Thousand

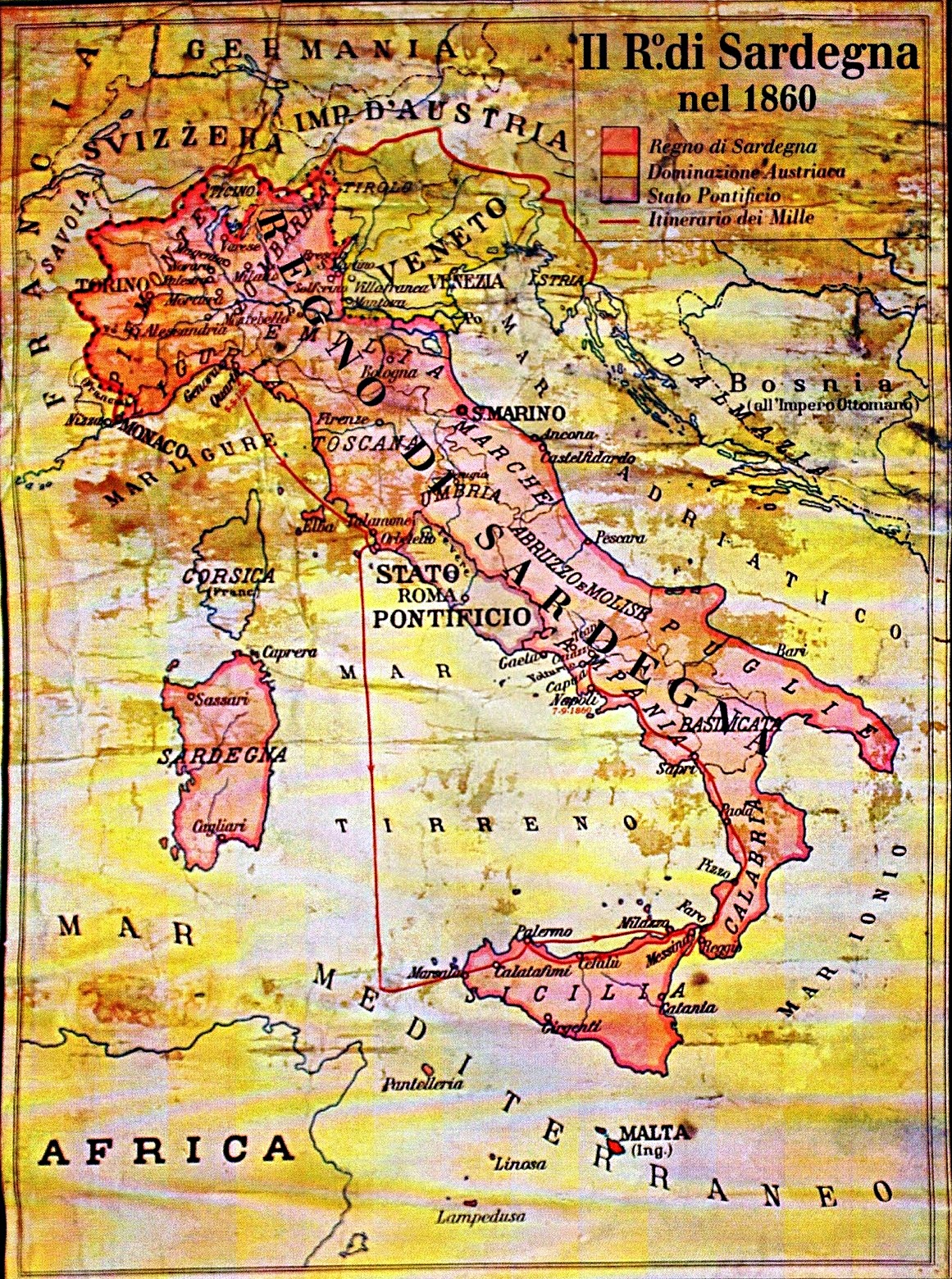
Maximum expansion of the Kingdom of Sardinia in 1860

== See also ==
- List of viceroys of Sardinia

== Bibliography ==
- Antonicelli, Aldo (2016). "From Galleys to Square Riggers: The Modernization of the Navy of the Kingdom of Sardinia". The Mariner's Mirror. 102 (2): 153–173.
- Hearder, Harry (1986). Italy in the Age of the Risorgimento, 1790–1870. London: Longman. ISBN 0-582-49146-0.
- Luttwak, Edward (2009). The Grand Strategy of the Byzantine Empire. The Belknap Press. ISBN 9780674035195.
- Mack Smith, Denis (1971). Victor Emanuel, Cavour and the Risorgimento. Oxford University Press.
- Martin, George Whitney (1969). The Red Shirt and the Cross of Savoy. New York: Dodd, Mead and Co. ISBN 0-396-05908-2.
- Murtaugh, Frank M. (1991). Cavour and the Economic Modernization of the Kingdom of Sardinia. New York: Garland Publishing. ISBN 978-0-8153-0671-9.
- Romani, Roberto (2012). "Reluctant Revolutionaries: Moderate Liberalism in the Kingdom of Sardinia, 1849–1859". Historical Journal. pp. 45–73.
- Romani, Roberto (2018). "The Reason of the Elites: Constitutional Moderatism in the Kingdom of Sardinia, 1849–1861". In Sensibilities of the Risorgimento. Brill. pp. 192–244.
- Schena, Olivetta (2019). "The Role Played by Towns in Parliamentary Commissions in the Kingdom of Sardinia in the Fifteenth and Sixteenth centuries". Parliaments, Estates and Representation. '39 (3): 304–315.
- Storrs, Christopher (1999). War, Diplomacy and the Rise of Savoy, 1690–1720. Cambridge University Press. ISBN 0-521-55146-3.
- Thayer, William Roscoe (1911). The Life and Times of Cavour vol 1. Old interpretations but useful on details; volume 1 goes to 1859]; volume 2 online covers 1859–62.

=== In Italian ===
- AAVV. (edited by F. Manconi), La società sarda in età spagnola, Consiglio Regionale della Sardegna, Cagliari, 2 volumes, 1992–1993.
- Blasco Ferrer Eduardo, Crestomazia Sarda dei primi secoli, collection Officina Linguistica, Ilisso, Nuoro, 2003, ISBN 9788887825657.
- Boscolo Alberto, La Sardegna bizantina e alto giudicale, Edizioni Della Torre, Cagliari, 1978.
- Casula, Francesco Cesare (1994). La storia di Sardegna. Sassari: Carlo Delfino Editore. ISBN 8871380843.
- Coroneo Roberto, Arte in Sardegna dal IV alla metà dell'XI secolo, AV eds., Cagliari, 2011.
- Coroneo Roberto, Scultura mediobizantina in Sardegna, Nuoro, Poliedro, 2000.
- Gallinari Luciano, "Il Giudicato di Cagliari tra XI e XIII secolo. Proposte di interpretazioni istituzionali", in Rivista dell'Istituto di Storia dell'Europa Mediterranea, no. 5, 2010.
- Manconi Francesco, La Sardegna al tempo degli Asburgo, Il Maestrale, Nuoro, 2010, ISBN 9788864290102.
- Manconi Francesco, Una piccola provincia di un grande impero, CUEC, Cagliari, 2012, ISBN 8884677882.
- Mastino Attilio, Storia della Sardegna Antica, Il Maestrale, Nuoro, 2005, ISBN 9788889801635.
- Meloni Piero, La Sardegna Romana, Chiarella, Sassari, 1980.
- Motzo Bachisio Raimondo, Studi sui bizantini in Sardegna e sull'agiografia sarda, Deputazione di Storia Patria della Sardegna, Cagliari, 1987.
- Ortu Gian Giacomo, La Sardegna dei Giudici, Il Maestrale, Nuoro, 2005, ISBN 9788889801024.
- Paulis Giulio, Lingua e cultura nella Sardegna bizantina: testimonianze linguistiche dell'influsso greco, Sassari, L'Asfodelo, 1983.
- Spanu Luigi, Cagliari nel seicento, Edizioni Castello, Cagliari, 1999.
- Zedda Corrado and Pinna Raimondo, "La nascita dei Giudicati. Proposta per lo scioglimento di un enigma storiografico", in Archivio Storico Giuridico di Sassari, second series, no. 12, 2007.
