= Perfect Fusion =

1847 act of the Savoyard king Charles Albert of Sardinia

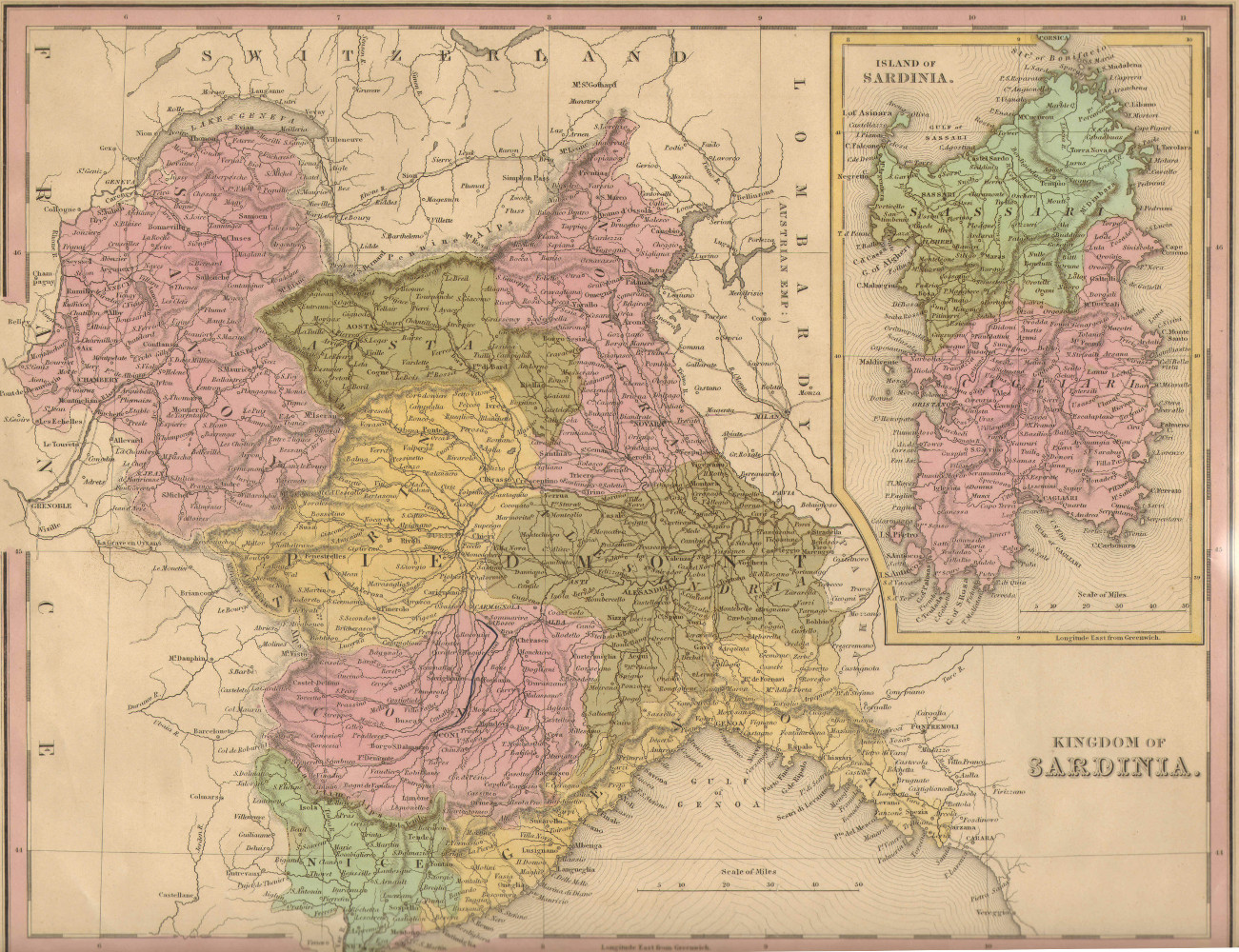
The Kingdom of Sardinia, comprising the Mainland States (Stati di Terraferma) and the island of Sardinia (displayed in a corner).

The Perfect Fusion (Italian: Fusione perfetta) was the 1847 act of the Savoyard King Charles Albert of Sardinia which abolished the administrative differences between the mainland states (Savoy and Piedmont) and the island of Sardinia within the Kingdom of Sardinia, in a fashion similar to the Nueva Planta decrees between the Crown of Castile and the realms of the Crown of Aragon between 1707 and 1716 and the Acts of Union between Great Britain and Ireland in 1800.

The once-Aragonese Kingdom of Sardinia had become a possession of the House of Savoy in 1720, and it had continued to be ruled as during the era of the Spanish Empire.

Although the Sardinian people had been showing hostility against the new Piedmontese rulers since a failed insurrection in 1794, the island's separate status from the mainland became a problem for the local notables from the two major cities of Cagliari and Sassari when liberal reforms began to be put in force in Turin, and some of them started to see their own legal system as a handicap more than a privilege. A minority of other Sardinian notables, like Giovanni Battista Tuveri and Federico Fenu, were not in favour of the idea for fear that further moves toward the centralisation of the Savoy-led kingdom might follow thereafter. King Charles Albert eventually solved the problem by transforming all his dominions into a single centralized state.

A new legal system entered into force in Sardinia, and the last viceroy, Claudio Gabriele de Launay, left Cagliari on 4 March 1848. The island was divided into three provinces ruled by their prefects and followed the system that had been used in Piedmont since 1815.

The ultimate goal of the unionist movement was assimilationist, for it set about, in the words of the Pietro Martini, "to transplant, without any reserves and obstacles, the culture and civilization of the Italian Mainland to Sardinia, and thereby form a single civil family under a Father better than a King, the great Charles Albert". Moreover, the fusion was supposed to spur commercial development in Sardinia and, by 1861, according to William S. Craig (the British consul-general at Cagliari), increase the kingdom's importance; however, the kingdom's insular part lost what little autonomy it had previously had in the process, as well as its historical title of "nation", as it had been referred to for centuries, and illustrated by the kingdom's national anthem. In this regard, the Fusion provoked a shift in terminology, with references to "Italy" replacing "Sardinia" instead.

On the whole, the island became an even more marginal part of the Savoyard kingdom, raising the so-called "Sardinian Question" pertaining to its difficult process of integration within a single national body: more specifically, Sardinians lost their former powers of taxation and autonomous representation in exchange for the Piedmontese Parliament taking over legislative responsibility on the island and some seats in the Congress. Most of the Sardinian unionists, including its leader Giovanni Siotto Pintor, would later come to regret it.

The Fusion could not improve the condition of the Sardinian notables, either. On the contrary, Sardinia's fusion into an Italian unitary state provoked, as a response, a marked increase in banditry and criminal activities against the central authorities.

== See also ==
Similar acts, such as:

- The unification of the Kingdom of Naples with the Kingdom of Sicily in 1816 to form the Kingdom of the Two Sicilies
- The Nueva Planta decrees of 1707–1716, which merged the Crown of Castile and Crown of Aragon into a single Kingdom of Spain
- Various political unions in Scandinavia:
  - Denmark–Norway
  - Kalmar Union
  - Sweden–Norway
- The two British pairs of "Acts of Union":
  - The Acts of Union 1707, which merged the Kingdom of England and the Kingdom of Scotland into a single Kingdom of Great Britain
  - The Acts of Union 1800, which merged the Kingdom of Great Britain and the Kingdom of Ireland into a single United Kingdom of Great Britain and Ireland

== Bibliography ==
- Martini, Pietro (1847). Sull'unione civile della Sardegna colla Liguria, col Piemonte e colla Savoia : discorso popolare. Cagliari: Tipografia di A. Timon.
- Fenu, Federico (1848). La Sardegna e la fusione col sardo continentale. Torino: Giuseppe Cassone.
- di Vesme, Carlo Baudi (1848). Considerazioni politiche ed economiche sulla Sardegna. Torino: Stamperia reale.
- Siotto Pintòr, Giovanni (1877). Storia civile dei popoli sardi dal 1798 al 1848. Torino: F. Casanova successore L. Beuf.
- Sorgia, Giancarlo (1968). La Sardegna nel 1848: la polemica sulla fusione. Cagliari: Editrice sarda Fossataro.
- Sotgiu, Girolamo (1984). Storia della Sardegna sabauda. Roma-Bari: Editore Laterza.
- Casula, Francesco Cesare (1994). La storia di Sardegna. Sassari: Delfino. ISBN 88-7138-063-0.
- Marroccu, Luciano; Manlio Brigaglia (1995). La perdita del Regno. Sassari: Editori Riuniti. ISBN 88-359-3917-8.
- Mastino, Attilio; Manlio Brigaglia, Gian Giacomo Ortu (2006). Storia della Sardegna. 2.Dal Settecento a oggi. Roma: Laterza. ISBN 88-420-7838-7.
- Contu, Gianfranco; Francesco Casula (2008). Storia dell'autonomia in Sardegna : dall'ottocento allo Statuto Sardo. Cagliari: Ufficio Studi G.M. Angioy della CSS.
- Casula, Francesco Cesare (2011). Sintesi di Storia Sardo-Italiana. Sassari: Delfino. ISBN 978-88-7138-606-5.
- Casula, Frantziscu Tzèsare (2011). Sìntesi de Istòria Sardu-Italiana (in Sardinian). Sassari: Delfino. ISBN 978-88-7138-606-5.
- Circolo culturale sardo Logudoro, Regione autonoma della Sardegna, Federazione Associazioni sarde in Italia (2012). Dalla cacciata dei piemontesi (1794) alla "perfetta fusione" (1847) e all'autonomia regionale (1948) : Convegno in occasione della celebrazione de Sa die de sa Sardigna (in Italian and Sardinian). Circolo culturale sardo Logudoro.
- Onnis, Omar (2015). La Sardegna e i sardi nel tempo. Cagliari: Arkadia.
