= Duchy of Genoa =

Italian duchy and part of Sardinia (1815–1848)

Duchy of Genoa Ducato di Genova (Italian) Ducâto de Zêna (Ligurian)
- 1815–1848
- Flag Coat of arms

- The Kingdom of Sardinia on a map of Italy in 1843, of which the Duchy of Genoa was a part
- Status: Part of Savoy
- Capital: Genoa
- Common languages: Ligurian, Italian
- Religion: Catholic Church
- Demonym: Genoese
- Government: Absolute monarchy
- Duke
  - 1815–1821: Victor Emmanuel I
  - 1821–1831: Charles Felix
  - 1831–1848: Charles Albert
- Historical era: Late modern
  - Congress of Vienna: 9 June 1815
  - Perfect Fusion: 1848
- Currency: Lira
Preceded by	Succeeded by
Republic of Genoa	Kingdom of Sardinia
- Today part of: France; Italy

The Duchy of Genoa (Italian: Ducato di Genova; Ligurian: Ducâto de Zêna) was a state consisting of the territories of the former Republic of Genoa. It was formed when the former territories of the republic were given to the Kingdom of Sardinia in 1815 as a result of the Congress of Vienna, and dissolved after the Perfect Fusion of 1848.

The Ligurian people, who valued their independent history and republican traditions, never liked their new political status. In 1849 Genoa exploded in revolt.

The state used the Sardinian lira as its currency, although the Mint of Genoa remained in operation by issuing coins.

After dissolution in 1848, the territories of the former duchy were divided between the departments (later called provinces) of Genoa and Nice.

== Administration ==
Replacing the French legislation in force, a specially introduced code was put into place, called; The regulation of the S.M. for civil and criminal matters of the Duchy of Genoa. (Italian: Il regolamento de S.M. per li materie civili e criminali, di Ducato di Genova.), promulgated on 13 May 1815 with the senate of Genoa ordered to register it and enforce it.

An edict in 1822 ruled out that, justice, dependent on the senate of Genoa, was administered by 7 prefecture courts: Genoa, Bobbio, Chiavari, Finale Marina, Novi Ligure, Sarzana and Savona.

In 1833, the Duchy of Genoa was one of the eight general intendencies of the States of the Mainland which were at the same time military divisions. It included the provinces of Genoa, Savona, Cairo Montenotte, Albenga, Finale Marina, Gavi, Bobbio, Chiavari, La Spezia and Sarzana.

== See also ==
- Republic of Genoa
- Ligurian Republic
- Kingdom of Sardinia
- Duchy of Savoy
- Savoyard state
