= Proclamation of the Kingdom of Italy =

Birth of unified Kingdom of Italy

- Painting depicting the proclamation of the Kingdom of Italy

Parliament of the Kingdom of Sardinia
- Citation: Law No. 4761 of 1861
- Territorial extent: Whole of Italy
- Enacted by: Parliament of the Kingdom of Sardinia
- Enacted: 17 March 1861
- Introduced by: Prime Minister of Italy Camillo Benso, Count of Cavour
- Status: In force

The Kingdom of Italy was proclaimed with a normative act of the Savoyard Kingdom of Sardinia — the law 17 March 1861, n. 4761 — with which Victor Emmanuel II assumed for himself and for his successors the title of King of Italy. 17 March is commemorated annually by the anniversary of the unification of Italy, a national holiday established in 1911 on the occasion of the 50th anniversary, and also celebrated, in the Republican era, in 1961 and 2011.

== History ==
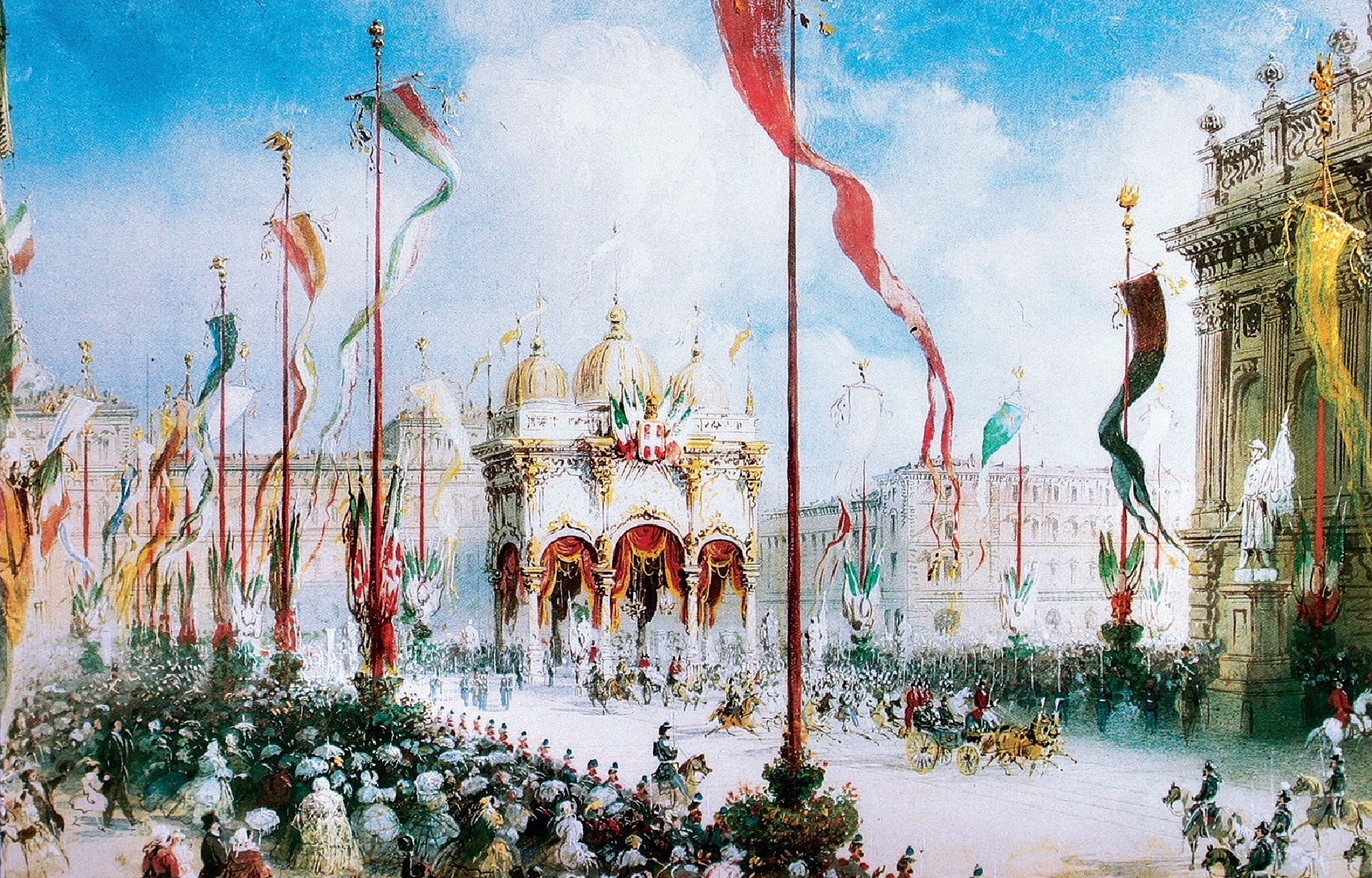
Carlo Bossoli: the royal procession at the opening of the Parliament of the Kingdom of Italy

Following the Second Italian War of Independence and the Expedition of the Thousand, led by Giuseppe Garibaldi, in the two-year period 1859–60, the goal of the unification of Italy had been largely achieved, with the sole exception of the Triveneto and Lazio. The annexation to the Kingdom of Sardinia of the various provinces had been sanctioned by a series of plebiscites. However, the new state still carried the name of Kingdom of Sardinia.

On 18 February 1861, the new Parliament, already known as the Italian Parliament, met in Turin, at Palazzo Carignano, formerly the seat of the Parliament of the Kingdom of Sardinia, even though it was numbered as VIII, thus continuing the numbering of the legislatures of the Kingdom of Sardinia. The Chamber of Deputies of the Kingdom of Italy also included parliamentarians elected in the "new provinces", while the Senate of the Kingdom of Italy, not elected but appointed by the king, had been integrated with appointments of senators from different parts of Italy.

The opening of the new legislature took place with the speech of the Crown pronounced by the King. The Senate in the reply voted on 26 February spoke explicitly of a new realm. The Chamber of Deputies in the response speech to King Victor Emmanuel II of Savoy, written by Giuseppe Ferrari and dated 13 March 1861, already declared that:

The suffrages of a whole people place the crown of Italy on your head blessed by Providence

King Victor Emmanuel II assumes the title of King of Italy with the law n. 4671 of 17 March 1861 of the Kingdom of Sardinia.

Immediately after the start of the legislature, on 21 February, the then Prime Minister Camillo Benso, Count of Cavour presented to the Senate a bill, consisting of a single article, to formalize the new name of the King. This became law on 17 March 1861, with the publication in the Official Journal of the Kingdom of Italy n.67. 17 March is commemorated annually by the anniversary of the unification of Italy, a national holiday established in 1911 on the occasion of the 50th anniversary.

== The law ==
The royal decree read:

Art. 1. King Victor Emmanuel II assumes for himself and for his successors the title of King of Italy

In the Report Cavour recalled that

Parliament, on the solemn day of the royal session, with the enthusiasm of gratitude and affection, hailed Victor Emmanuel II, King of Italy.

However, in the text approved by the Senate a second article also appears on the question of the heading of legislative acts. It was therefore established that:

Art. 2. The acts of the Government and any other act which must be titled in the name of the King will be headed with the following formula: (In the name of the King) By the Grace of God and the will of the Nation KING OF ITALY

The numeral of Victor Emmanuel of Savoy continued to be "second", not "first", as a sign of the continuity of the House of Savoy dynasty which had achieved Italian unification and of the continuity of the Statuto Albertino.
