= Francesco Cesare Casula =

Italian historian

- Born: 12 September 1933 (age 93); Livorno, Kingdom of Italy
- Other name: Frantziscu Tzèsare Casula
- Education: University of Cagliari; University of Palermo
- Occupations: Historian; academic
- Employers: University of Sassari; University of Cagliari; President of Italy (Francesco Cossiga); National Research Council; Ministry of Education, University and Research

Francesco Cesare Casula (Sardinian: Frantziscu Tzèsare Casula; born 12 September 1933) is an Italian historian from Sardinia.

== Biography ==
Born in Livorno, Tuscany, Casula lived there until 1949 when, because of his father's death caused by an Allied bombardment of the city, his entire family moved to Cabras, Sardinia. While living there, he continued his studies at the De Castro high school of Oristano.

A pupil of Ovidio Addis and Alberto Boscolo, he graduated in literature in Cagliari in 1959, immediately starting a university career and subsequently specializing in Languages at the University of Palermo.

In 1969 he obtained the Libera Docenza in Paleography and Diplomatics, and started teaching History of Sardinia at the University of Sassari during that same year.

Since 1980 and until 2008 he has been full professor of Medieval History in the Faculty of Literature and Philosophy of the University of Cagliari. During that same time period he also held the position of Director of the Institute on Italo-Iberian relations and of the Institute of the History of Mediterranean Europe of the National Research Council (CNR), based in Cagliari and with sections in Genoa, Turin and Milan.

Member of the National History Deputation, for ten years he was a member of the board of directors of the Society of Italian Historians and of the Permanent Commission for the History of the Aragon Crown.

From 1985 to 1992 he has been cultural advisor to the President of the Italian Republic Francesco Cossiga, and during those same years he took part in diplomatic missions in Romania, US, Spain and other countries.

From 2001 to 2006 he was a member of the Technical Secretariat for Research Planning at the Ministry of Education, University and Research (MIUR) headed by Minister Letizia Moratti.

He is the author of important works of notable scientific interest in Paleography and about the history of Sardinia, and during his years of historical research he has developed the so-called "doctrine of statehood", which revisits Sardinian history by denouncing the approximation with which, in his opinion, historians of the past, such as Zurita or Fara, have handed down the historical judgment on the events that took place on the Island; he is considered one of the most important medievalists in Italy.

== Publications ==
During his long academic career he has been the author of numerous writings which, according to the list made by Francesco Floris, make up a bibliography with 76 main titles:

- Un bassorilievo sardo del sec. XVI, Studi sardi, XVII, 1962;
- Profilo storico della città di Oristano, 1961;
- Lo Zurita e il giudice Chiano d'Arborea, in Atti del VII Congresso di storia della Corona d'Aragona, II, 1962;
- Barisone I d'Arborea e Barisone II di Torres, voci in Dizionario biografico degli Italiani, VI, 1964;
- Per una più completa genealogia degli Arborea all'epoca di Pietro IV il Cerimonioso, Studi sardi, XX, 1966;
- La datatio chronica nei documenti di cancelleria sardo-aragonesi del secolo XIV, Studi sardi, XX, 1966;
- Sardegna e Spagna. Ricerche storiche 1947–1968, 1968;
- Carte reali diplomatiche di Alfonso III il Benigno re d'Aragona riguardanti l'Italia, Pàdova, 1971;
- Documenti inediti sui possessi sardi del monastero di S. Lorenzo alle Rivolte di Pisa, in Medioevo – Età moderna. Studi in onore del prof. Alberto Boscolo, 1972;
- Il documento regio nella Sardegna Aragonese, 1973;
- Sulle origini delle cancellerie giudicali sarde e Influenze catalane nella Cancelleria giudicale arborense nel sec. XII, in Studi di Paleografia e Diplomatica, 1974;
- La Cancelleria sovrana dell'Arborea dalla creazione del Regnum Sardiniae alla fine del giudicato, Medioevo. Saggi e rassegne, 1977;
- Carte reali diplomatiche di Giovanni I il Cacciatore re d'Aragona, riguardanti l'Italia, 1977;
- Breve storia della scrittura in Sardegna, 1978;
- Cultura e scrittura nell'Arborea al tempo della Carta de Logu, in Il mondo della Carta de Logu, 1979;
- L'assetto politico territoriale della Sardegna basso-medioevale, 1981;
- Profilo storico della Sardegna catalano-Aragonese, 1982;
- Stato attuale della ricerca sulla Sardegna Aragonese, in La ricerca storica sulla Sardegna, Archivio storico sardo, XXXIII, 1982;
- Ai margini della Guerra del Vespro. Gli Aleramici di Saluzzo in Sicilia e in Sardegna, in Atti dell'XI Congresso di storia della Corona d'Aragona, 1983;
- La scoperta dell'effigie di Eleonora d'Arborea, Quaderni bolotanesi, X, 1984;
- Genealogie medioevali di Sardegna (in collaborazione con L.L. Brook, M.M. Costa, A.M. Oliva, R. Pavoni, M. Tangheroni), Casteddu, 1984;
- L'assetto politico e territoriale della Sardegna medioevale, in Sardegna nel mondo mediterraneo. Atti del II Convegno internazionale di Studi geografico-storici Sassari 1981, 1984;
- Il caso di Eleonora d'Arborea: in quelle immagini un pantheon?, Ichnusa, 1984;
- Pievi e parrocchie in Sardegna;
- Premesse storiche (con V. Loi), in Atti del VI Congresso di storia della Chiesa in Italia, II, 1984;
- Il territorio medioevale di Villa di Chiesa, in Studi su Iglesias medioevale, 1985;
- La storia della Sardegna da Miezko I di Polonia a Ferdinando II d'Aragona, 1985;
- Ricerche archivistiche sulla battaglia di Sanluri nel 1409, in Studi in onore di G. Todde, Archivio storico sardo, XXXV, 1986;
- Eleonora d'Arborea, in I personaggi della storia medievale, 1988;
- La statualità della storia della Sardegna, in Ethnos. Le autonomie etniche e speciali in Italia e nell'Europa mediterranea. Processi storici e istituzioni, 1988;
- La politica del Giudicato di Torres, Rivista cistercense, 1989;
- La Sardegna Aragonese, voll. 2 (La Corona d'Aragona; La Nazione sarda), Tàtari 1990;
- Gli schiavi sardi della battaglia di Sanluri del 1409, Medioevo. Saggi e rassegne, 1990;
- La rivolta degli Alagon sardi in Lettres de battalla del 1472–73, Medioevo. Saggi e rassegne, 1991;
- Partecipazione del regno sardo di Torres all'impresa pisana delle Baleari, in Atti del Colloquio internazionale sul Liber Majolichinus, 1991;
- I trattati diplomatici sardo-aragonesi del 1323–26, in Sardegna, Mediterraneo e Atlantico tra Medioevo e Età moderna. Studi in memoria del prof. Alberto Boscolo, 1993;
- Il Regnum Sardiniae et Corsicae nell'espansione mediterranea della Corona d'Aragona. Aspetti politici, in Atti del XIV Congresso di storia della Corona d'Aragona, 1993;
- La storia di Sardegna, voll. 3, 1994;
- La Carta de Logu del regno d'Arborea. Traduzione libera e commento storico, 1994;
- Storia di un regno 1324–1861, in Il regno di Sardegna, 1995;
- Cagliari capitale di un regno, 1995;
- Una spia arborense nel castello Aragonese di Longonsardo, in Studi di geografia e storia in onore di A. Terrosu Asole, 1996;
- La terza via della storia. Il caso Italia, 1997;
- Considerazioni sul rapporto giuridico Arborea-Aragona da un memoriale del 1405, in Studi storici in memoria di Giancarlo Sorgia, Archivio storico sardo, XXXIX, 1998;
- Di.Sto.Sa. Dizionario Storico Sardo, Sassari, Delfino, 2003,
- Eleonora regina del regno d'Arborea, 2004.
- Per un nuovo insegnamento della storia, Pisa, ETS, 2003.
- (con E. Rossi), Autonomia sarda e autonomia catalana, Pisa, ETS, 2006.
- La storiografia sarda ieri e oggi, Sassari, Delfino, 2009.
- Italia: il grande inganno, 1861–2011. L'unico stato al mondo che non vuole sapere quando è nato, dove è nato e qual è la sua storia, Sassari, Delfino, 2010.
- La Storia di Sardegna, Sassari, La Nuova Sardegna, 2017.
