= Reale Mutua Assicurazioni =

Italian insurance company

- Industry: Insurance
- Founded: 1828; 198 years ago in Turin, Italy.
- Headquarters: Turin, Italy
- Key people: Luigi Lana (Chairman)
- Number of employees: 3900 (2019)
- Website: realegroup.eu/EN

Reale Mutua Assicurazioni is an Italian mutual insurance company based in Turin, Italy. Founded in 1828, it is the largest Italian insurance company operating in the mutual form. The Reale group operates in Italy, Spain, Chile and Greece.

== History ==
The company was founded in Turin on 31 December 1828 as the Società Reale di Assicurazioni Generale e Mutua contro gli Incendi, initially providing mutual insurance against fire. In 1829, King Charles Felix of Sardinia signed the company's founding charter and took out its first policy, covering the Palazzo Chiablese. In 1844, the company added hail insurance to its existing fire insurance business. In 1859, the company expanded by opening its first branch in Milan, followed by openings in various Italian cities in the following decades.

In 1922, the company was renamed Società Reale Mutua di Assicurazioni, reflecting its expansion into new lines of business, including life, theft, property damage, accident and third-party liability insurance. In 1933, the company moved its headquarters to Palazzo della Reale Mutua Assicurazioni, where its seat is still currently located.
