= Giacomo Berger =

French-Italian painter (1754–1822)

Giacomo Berger or Jacques Berger (1754–1822) was a French-Italian painter, active in a Neoclassical style, depicting historical subjects and portraits.

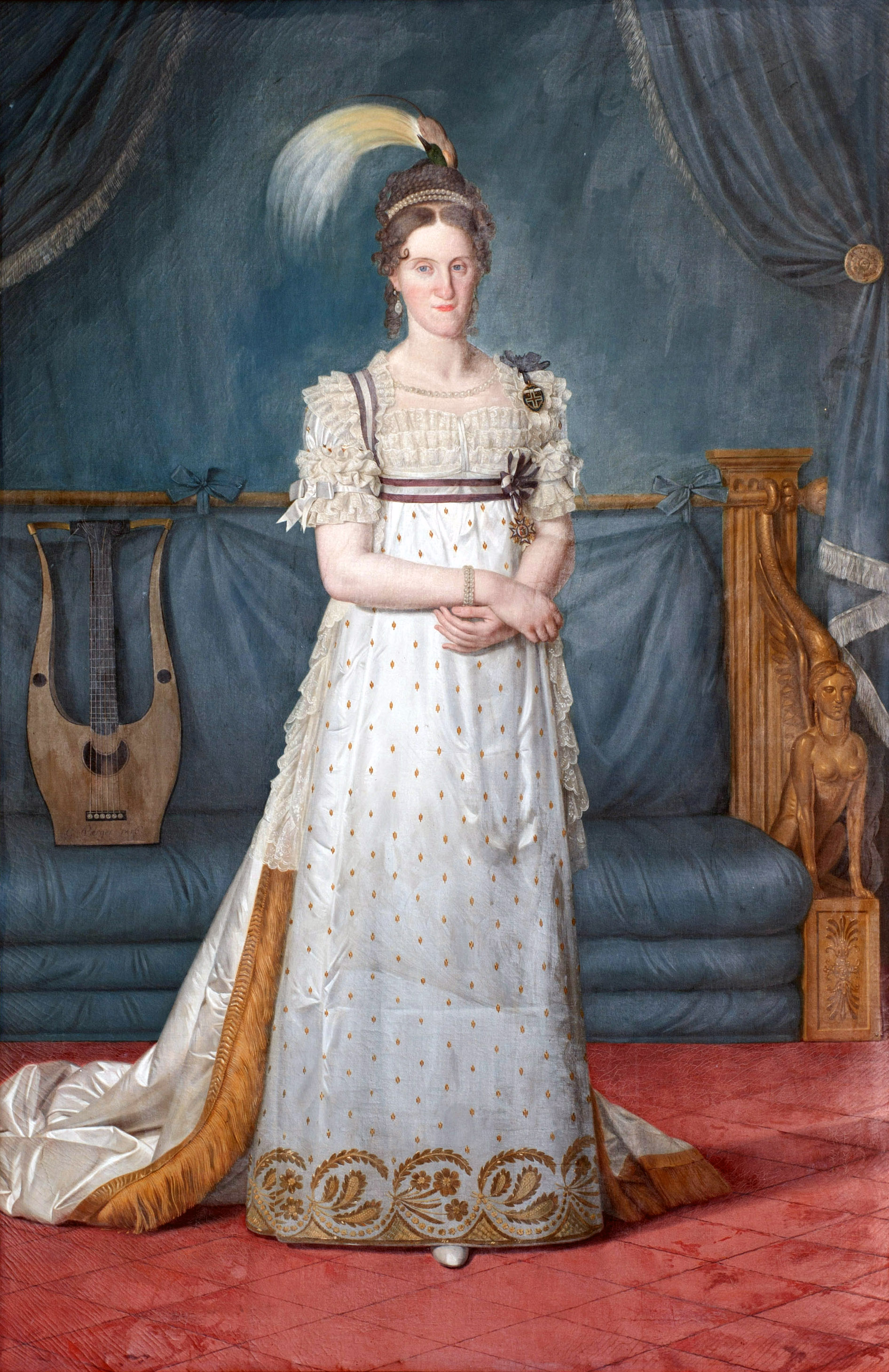
Portrait of Maria Cristina di Borbone (of Naples) (1804–1806)

== Biography ==
He was born in Chambéry, France. During 1779 to 1782, he was a pupil of Laurent Pécheux at the Albertina Academy in Turin. In 1784, he travels to Rome to study with Domenico Corvi, where he frequents the French Academy in Rome then directed by Louis-Jean-François Lagrenée.

During the French occupation of the Kingdom of Sardinia, he returned to Turin, and participated in a local commission which appropriated artworks from the Royal Palace in Turin to send to France. By 1800, he was recruited to work as professor of history painting at the Academy of Fine Arts in Naples, under the leadership of Jean Baptiste Wicar. From 1806 to 1809, he became director of the academy in Naples. He worked under the court of Joachim Murat in the Palace of Caserta and the PPalazzo della Prefettura in Naples (Sancha of Majorca renounces nunnery for the crown of Naples).

Among his works, he made pastel portraits of his master Pécheux and his family. In Rome, he exhibited Dying Procris, Chaste Susanna, Wife of Potiphar, Orpheus crying for Eurydice, and Death of Epaminondas (1786).

Other works include All’isola di Seriffo (1805) and Danae and Persus in the chest (1808) He decorated one of the ceilings of the royal palace at Caserta with a fresco of Epaminondas. He painted a canvas of Justice. From Naples, he was commissioned to make two large portraits of Charles Felix of Sardinia and his wife Maria Cristina of Naples and Sicily, now found at the Castle of Agliè. Berger died in 1822 in Naples.
