= Filiberto Avogadro di Collobiano =

Italian courtier and politician

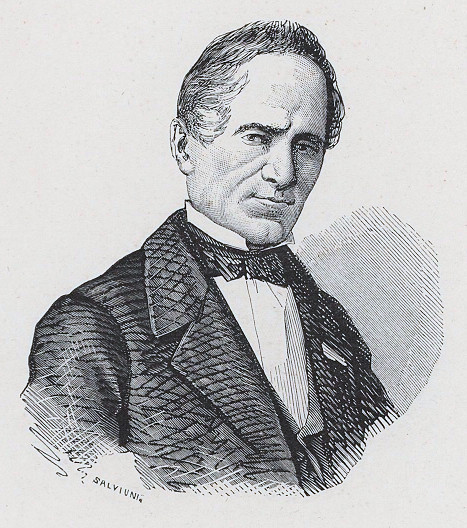

Member of the Subalpine Senate
- In office 10 May 1848 – 5 June 1868

Personal details
- Born: 25 May 1797 Ivrea, Piedmont, Kingdom of Sardinia
- Died: 5 June 1868 (aged 71) Turin, Piedmont, Kingdom of Italy
- Spouse: Carolina Arborio Biamino di Caresana (m. 1829)
- Education: University of Turin

Filiberto Avogadro di Collobiano (25 May 1797 – 5 June 1868) was an Italian courtier and politician who was an advisor to King Charles Felix of Sardinia, who conferred on him the noble title of count, and a member of the royal court of King Charles Albert. He was a member of the Subalpine Senate for 20 years.

== Early life ==
Filiberto Avogadro di Collobiano was born on 25 May 1797 in Ivrea, Piedmont, in the Kingdom of Sardinia. His father was Count Luigi Ottavio, and his mother was Marianna Caresana di Carisio. He studied at the University of Turin and then entered the Piemonte Reale Cavalleria in the Royal Sardinian Army in 1815, with the rank of first lieutenant. In 1820, he was made a lieutenant in the Royal Carabinieri.

== Courtier ==
In 1821, Avogadro entered the service of the royal court of Sardinia and became King Charles Felix's second squire. Three years later, he was promoted to first secretary of the cabinet. He eventually became the gentleman of the royal chamber, a position he held until the king's death in 1831. Charles Felix sent Avogadro di Collobiano to Rome in 1827 as ambassador extraordinary to address the alienation of ecclesiastical property in Piedmont and Genoa, which was resolved by March of the following year.

On 1 April 1829, Avogadro was made Count of Valdengo and lord of Collobiano. As a courtier, he became a trusted advisor to Charles Felix. On 11 August 1829, he married Carolina Arborio Biamino di Caresana, who was a lady of the royal court of Queen Consort Maria Cristina in Vercelli.

Upon Charles Felix's death in 1831, Avogadro and other members of his family were expelled from the court by his successor, King Charles Albert, who mistrusted the advisors and courtiers of his predecessor. As a result, he went to Naples with the widowed Maria Cristina. Over time, Charles Albert's mistrust of the Avogadro family diminished, and Filiberto was appointed to his court and was made Grand Cordon of the Order of Saints Maurice and Lazarus and first secretary of the order.

Avogadro became the vice president of the powerful Subalpine Agrarian Association in Turin. The liberals and radicals fiercely contested the selection of the organization's president in 1846, and Charles Albert intervened by appointing Avogadro as president, with the support of the radicals. Avogadro then fell out of favour with the radicals, who accused him of opposing their political goals at the congresses of Mortara in 1846 and Casale Monferrato in 1847.

On 3 April 1848, Avogadro was appointed a member of the Subalpine Senate. He was made a Commander of the Order of the Crown of Italy on 22 April 1868. He died in Turin on 5 June 1868.
