= Duke of Chablais =

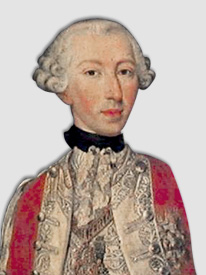
Prince Benedetto, the third Duke of Chablais

The title Duke of Chablais (Italian: Duca di Chiablese, French: duc de Chablais) was a subsidiary title of the Duke of Savoy and later the King of Sardinia, both of the House of Savoy. The title is named after the province of Chablais, whose capital was Thonon-les-Bains.

The title was granted four times to members of the Savoy family. Three died in infancy, and the fourth did not have any children to inherit the title.

- Prince Emanuele Philibert, infant son of Victor Amadeus II of Savoy, was created Duke of Chablais on 1 December 1705 and died 19 December 1705.
- Prince Carlo, infant son of Charles Emmanuel III of Savoy, held the title from 23 July 1733 until his death on 28 December 1733.
- Prince Benedetto, another son of Charles Emmanuel III of Savoy, was created Duke of Chablais at his birth on 21 June 1741 and held the title until his death on 4 January 1808. Benedetto was the only Duke of Chablais to marry, making his wife Princess Maria Anna of Savoy the only Duchess of Chablais.
- Prince Carlo Alberto, son of Victor Emmanuel II, was created Duke of Chablais at his birth on 2 June 1851, and died 22 June 1854.
