= Palazzo della Reale Mutua Assicurazioni =

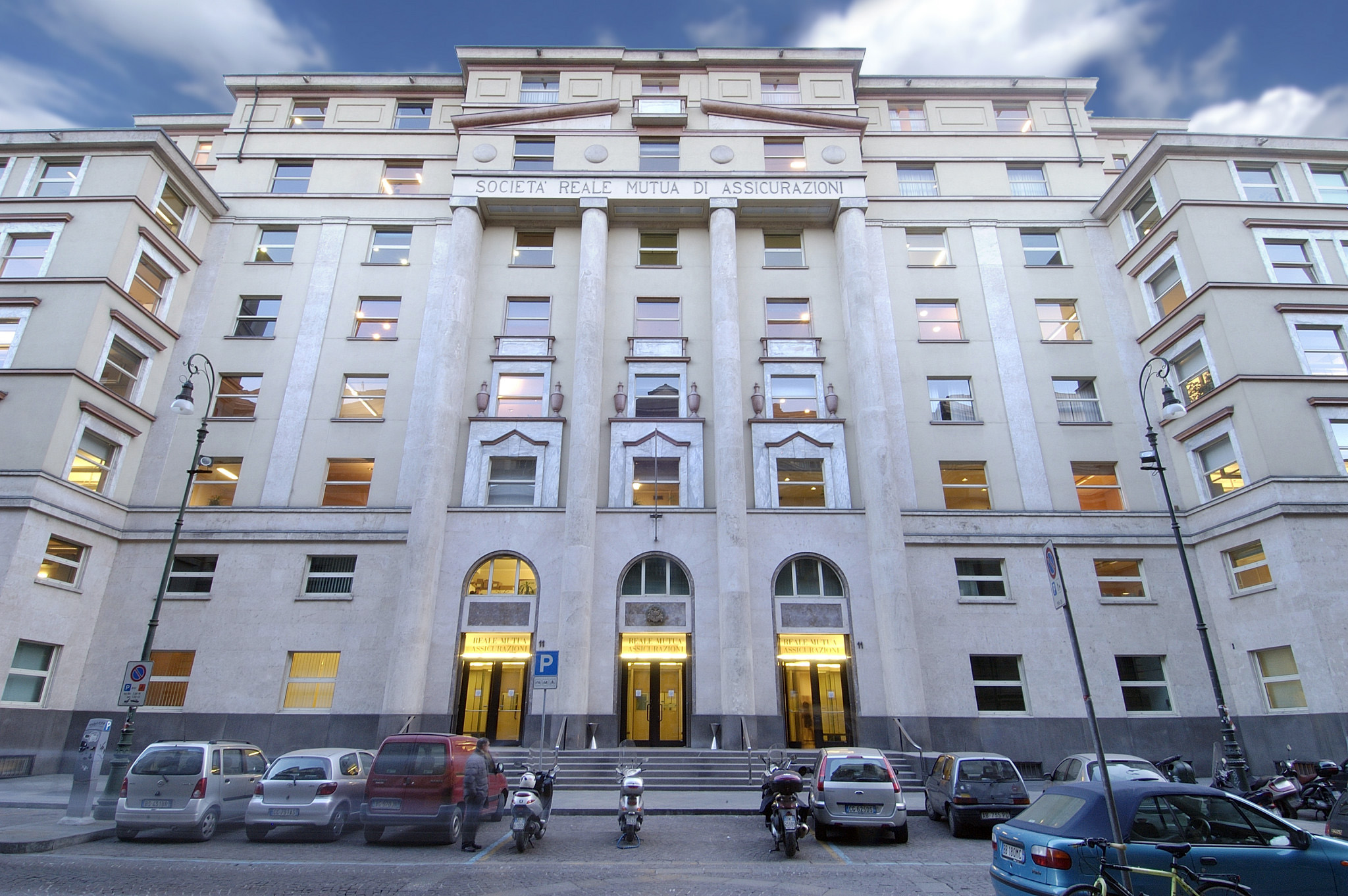
- Palazzo della Reale Mutua Assicurazioni in 2011
- Click on the map for a fullscreen view

General information
- Location: Turin, Italy
- Coordinates: 45°04′27.04″N 7°40′44.17″E

The Palazzo della Reale Mutua Assicurazioni is a historic building located in Turin, Italy.

== History ==
Original sketch

The building was commissioned by the Società Reale Mutua di Assicurazioni insurance company to serve as its new headquarters. By the late 1920s, the company's historic premises in the Palazzo Biandrate Aldobrandino di San Giorgio had become inadequate and undersized for its expanding activities. The administration of Reale Mutua therefore began acquiring, one after another, the buildings that occupied a block in central Turin, with the aim of consolidating the company's activities in a new headquarters. The possibility of enlarging or adapting the existing premises was soon deemed impractical, and the existing buildings were subsequently demolished to make way for a new, purpose-built complex.

The project was entrusted to architects Armando Melis de Villa and Giovanni Bernocco. Construction began in 1931 and was completed in 1933, when the company moved in the new building.

During World War II, the building was partially damaged by the air raids of 8 December 1942 and 13 July 1943.

== Description ==
The building features an Art Deco style. Its design incorporates cutting-edge technical solutions for the time it was built, such as a welded steel load-bearing structure.
