= Palazzo Chiablese =

Wing of the Royal Palace of Turin, Italy

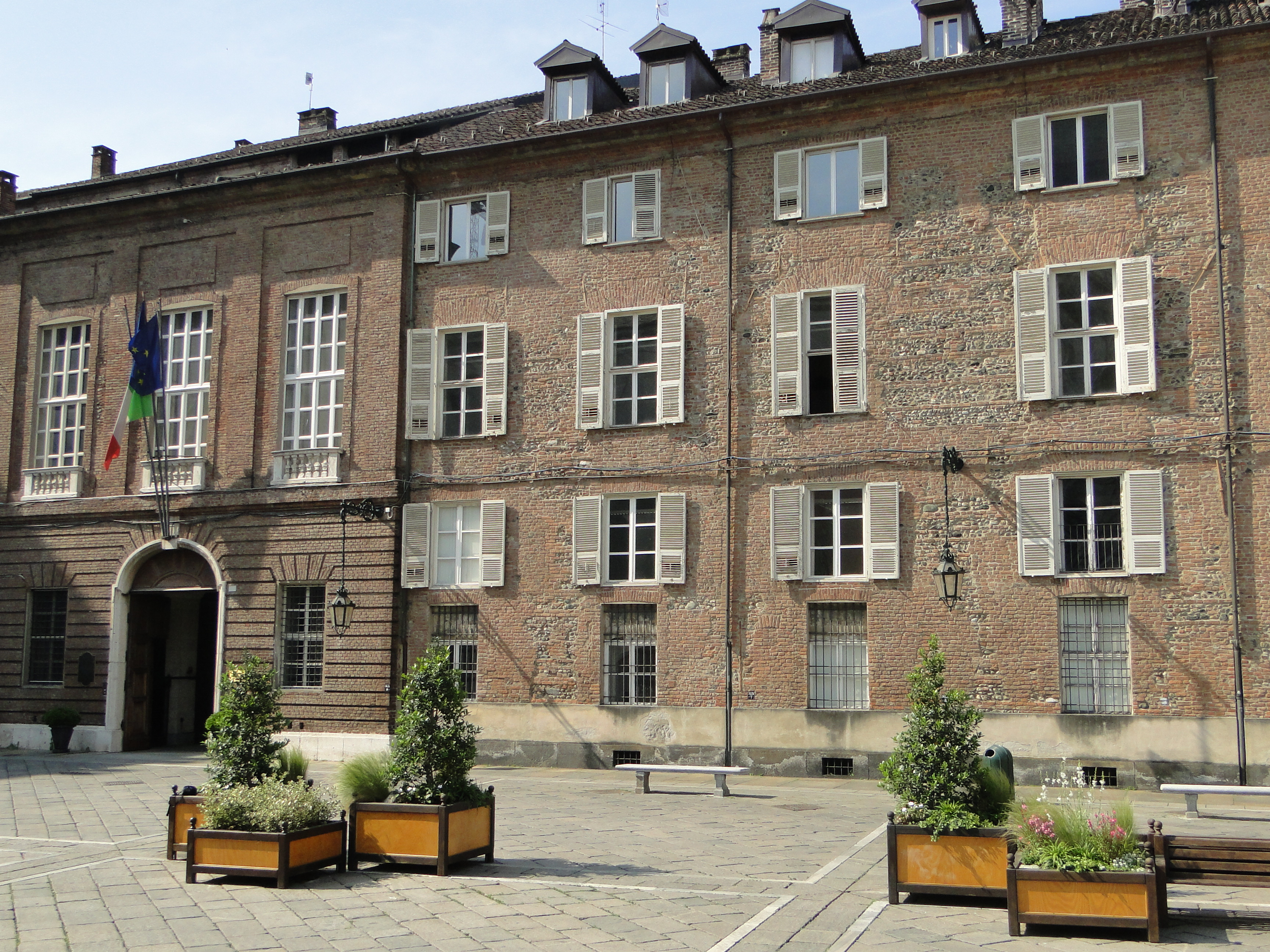
Palazzo Chiablese

The Palazzo Chiablese is a wing of the Royal Palace of Turin, in Northwest Italy.

It was the residence of Benedetto, Duke of Chablais first and then of King Charles Felix of Sardinia, and Ferdinando, Duke of Genoa. Today it is home to a cultural collection honouring the history of Piedmont.

== History ==
Located in Piazza San Giovanni, the Palazzo Chiablese is part of the Royal Palace of Turin which was a residence of the Kings of Sardinia. As an extension of the palace, it was the home of Maurice of Savoy and his wife Luisa Christina of Savoy before they moved to the Vigna di Madama outside the capital. It was then used as offices by the court.

From 1753, it served as the residence of Benedetto of Savoy, son of Charles Emmanuel III and Elisabeth Therese of Lorraine. Consequently, it was named after his courtesy title of Duke of Chablais.

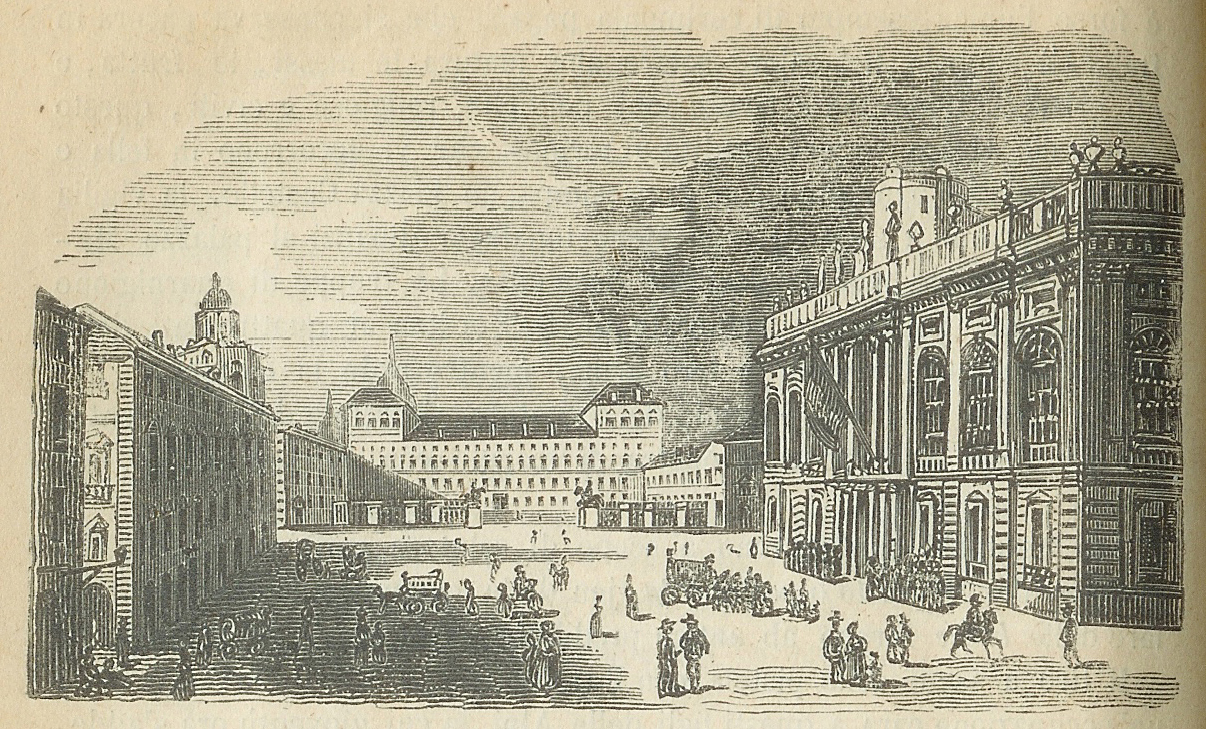
Engraving of Turin's Piazza Castello, Royal Palace (center), Palazzo Madama (front right) and Palazzo Chiablese (back left)

Chablais carried out various improvements to the interior of the palace under the direction of Benedetto Alfieri, a popular Savoyard architect of the era. After the death of Chablais it was the home of his wife Maria Anna of Savoy who willed it to her brother Charles Felix, Duke of Genoa who lived there with his wife Princess Maria Cristina of Naples and Sicily. The former died here in 1831. The building was the seat of the French provisional government during the Napoleonic occupation. It was the home of Camillo Borghese and his wife Pauline Bonaparte.

Restored to the House of Savoy, it was later the birthplace of Margherita of Savoy, daughter of the Duke of Genoa and later Queen of Italy as wife of Umberto I.

A century later the palace was bombed during World War II, which caused considerable damage and many furnishings and decorative elements were lost. The property passed to the State in the 1950s and it was then used as the Superintendence headquarters. Later on the palace was converted to provide the dormitories, kitchens and facilities for the pupils of the Istituto Nazionale per le Figlie dei Militari Italiani (National Institute for Italian Soldiers' Daughters) which was installed there.

Until 1995 it was home to the city's cinema archive when it became the home of the Soprintendenza per i Beni Ambientali, Architettonici e Archeologici – The "General Directorate for the scenery, fine arts, architecture and contemporary art". It is closed to the public except on special occasions and for pre-booked tours.
