= Charles Felix of Sardinia =

King of Sardinia from 1821 to 1831

Charles Felix
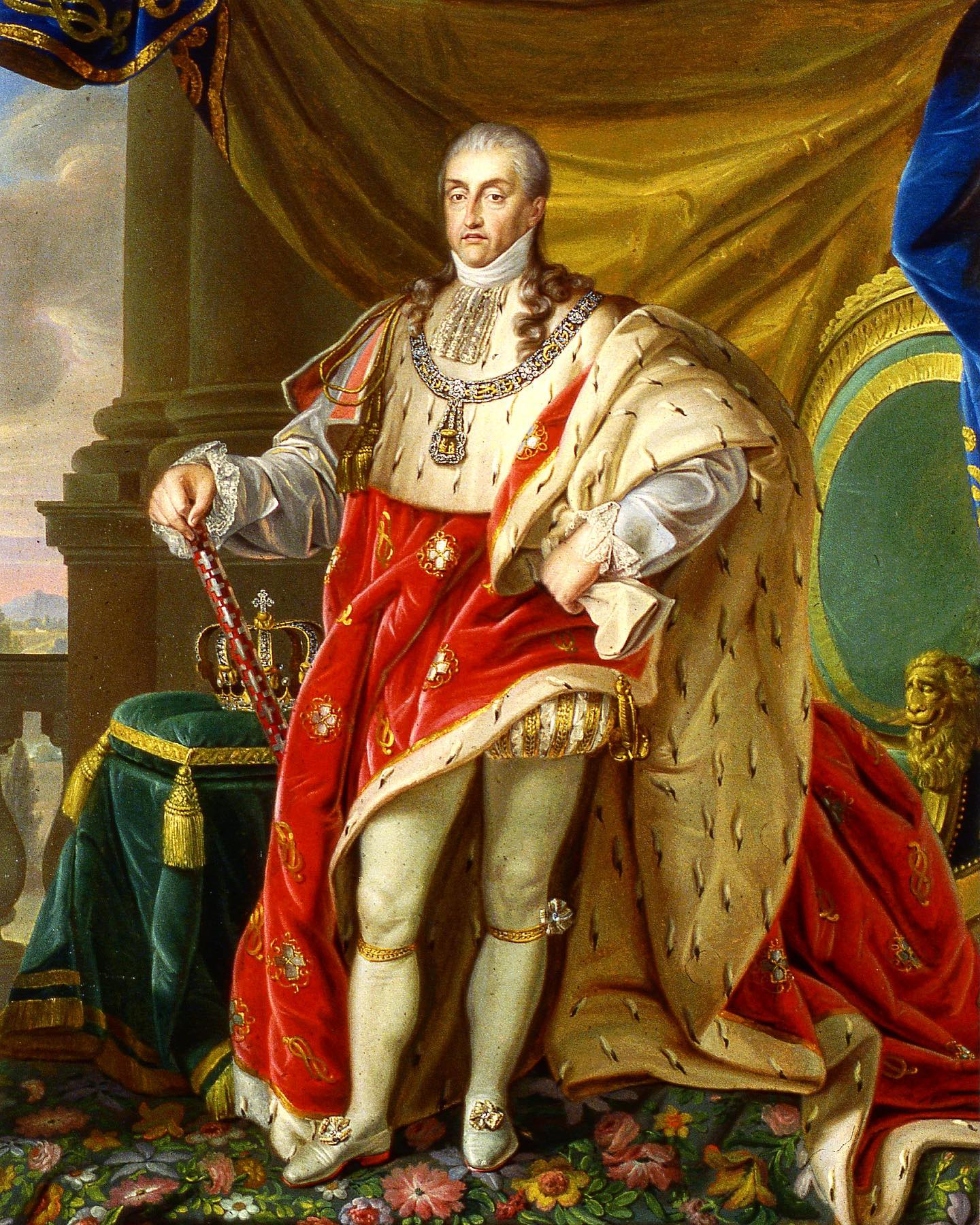
- Portrait by Luigi Bernero, c. 1821

King of Sardinia Duke of Savoy
- Reign: 12 March 1821 – 27 April 1831
- Coronation: 25 April 1821
- Predecessor: Victor Emmanuel I
- Successor: Charles Albert

Duke of Genoa
- Reign: 18 June 1815 – 27 April 1831
- Successor: Ferdinand I
- Born: 6 April 1765; Royal Palace, Turin, Kingdom of Sardinia
- Died: 27 April 1831 (aged 66); Palazzo Chiablese, Turin, Kingdom of Sardinia
- Burial: 28 April 1831; Hautecombe Abbey, Saint-Pierre-de-Curtille
- Spouse: Maria Cristina of Naples and Sicily (m. 1807)
Names
- Carlo Felice Giuseppe Maria di Savoia
- House: Savoy
- Father: Victor Amadeus III of Sardinia
- Mother: Maria Antonia Ferdinanda of Spain

Charles Felix (Italian: Carlo Felice Giuseppe Maria; 6 April 1765 – 27 April 1831) was the King of Sardinia and ruler of the Savoyard states from 12 March 1821 until his death in 1831. He was the last male-line member of the House of Savoy that started with Victor Amadeus I, and caused the line of Victor Amadeus I's younger brother Thomas Francis to seize the throne after Felix's death.

== Early life ==
Charles Felix was born in Turin as the eleventh child and fifth son born to Victor Amadeus III of Savoy and Maria Antonia Ferdinanda of Spain. His paternal grandparents were Charles Emmanuel III of Savoy and his German wife Polyxena of Hesse-Rotenburg. His maternal grandparents were French-born King Philip V of Spain and his Italian wife, Elisabeth Farnese.

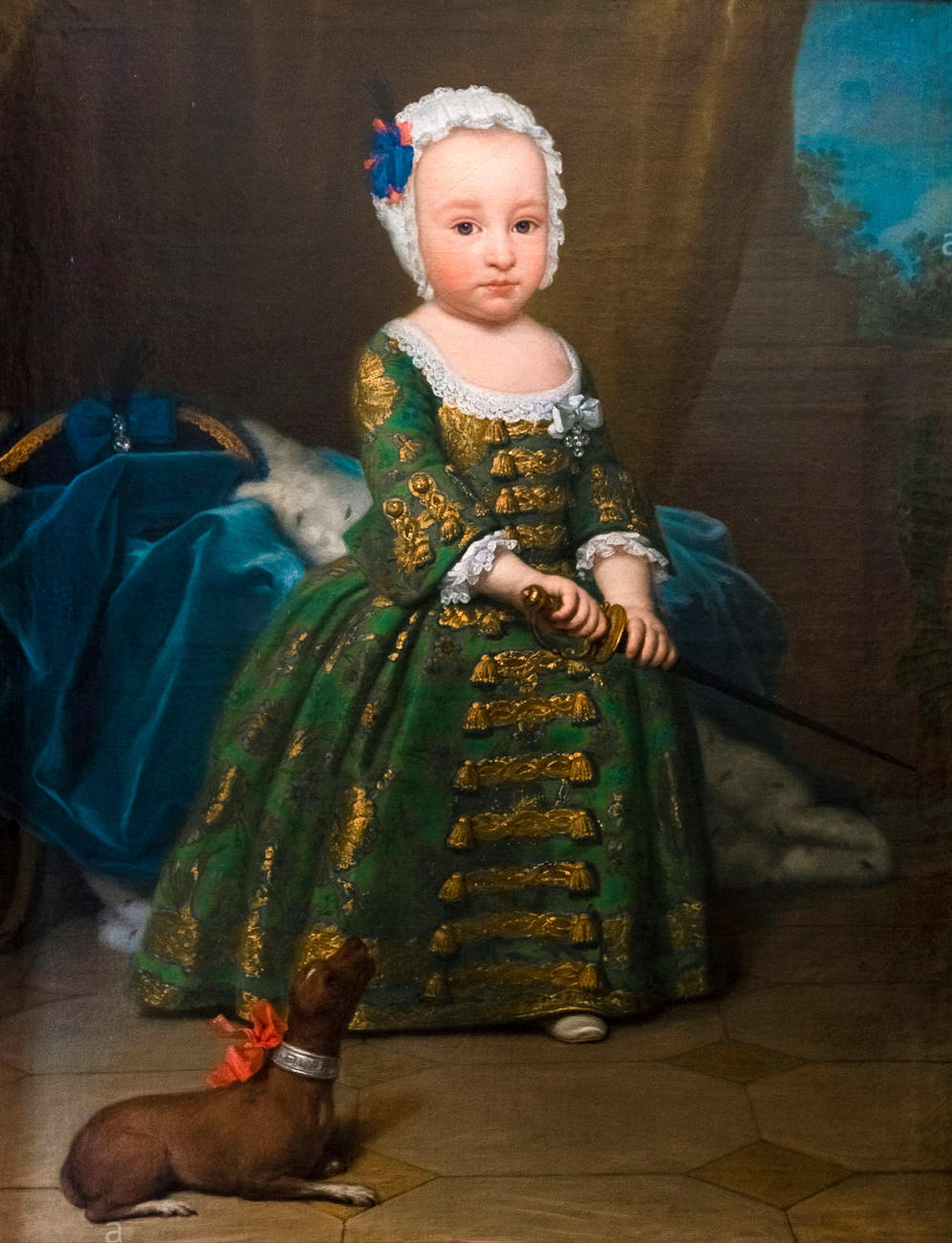
Portrait of Charles Felix as a child, by Giuseppe Duprà, c. 1765-67

He was a younger brother of two other rulers of Savoy Charles Emmanuel IV and Victor Emmanuel I. He spent his childhood with his sister Maria Carolina and his younger brother, Giuseppe Benedetto Placido, Count of Moriana, at the Castle of Moncalieri.

From his youth, Carlo Felice was reported as having a very complex character: on the one hand consistent and inflexible, private, distrustful, and impulsive, if not touchy and vindictive; on the other hand honest, sincere, and capable of emotion and fondness. He had a clever mind, at times even ironic. He possessed a sacral conception of the monarchy and the right to reign.

During the years of the French Revolution and the Italian campaign, Charles Felix formed part of a "parallel court" opposed to Charles Emmanuel IV's circle, along with his brother Victor Emmanuel, the latter's wife Maria Theresa, Maurizio Giuseppe Duke of Monferrat, and Giuseppe Placido, count of Moriana.

In this period, Charles Felix began to keep a personal diary, which is an important source for events and his conflicts with the court in Savoy.

== Italian campaign (1792–1798) ==
When war broke out with France, Charles Felix did not distinguish himself as a soldier, despite having received a military education. In 1792, after the French occupation of the Duchy of Savoy and the county of Nice, he followed the troops to Saluzzo and in 1793, he accompanied his father, Victor Amadeus III, who had directed the operations for the reconquest of Nice and Savoy along with the Austrians under general J. de Vins, into the Susa Valley, to Pinerolo, Cuneo, and Tende.

Charles Felix remained very far from the front lines in any case. In spring 1794, after the arrival in Aosta of his brother the Duke of Monferrat, Charles Felix and Giuseppe Placido went to Morgex in order to retake some positions of relative strategic importance, but they did not achieve anything.

On 28 April 1796, Victor Amadeus III was forced to sign the Armistice of Cherasco with the French, which was followed by the Treaty of Paris on 15 May, which accepted French control of Nice, Savoy, Genevoise, and some fortresses. Charles Felix, who had been titled Duke of Genoa, obtained the title of Marquis of Susa in compensation for his nominal loss.

Victor Amadeus III died in October of the same year and was succeeded as Prince of Piedmont by Charles Emmanuel IV. The relationship between the new king and Charles Felix had never been good but now deteriorated as the king strove to keep his brothers in the dark about affairs of the state.

Two years into his reign, Charles Emmanuel IV was forced to surrender all royal control on the mainland. Along with the king and the rest of the royal family, Charles Felix left Turin on the evening of 9 December 1798 for Cagliari, where they arrived on 3 March 1799.

== Viceroy of Sardinia (1799–1814) ==
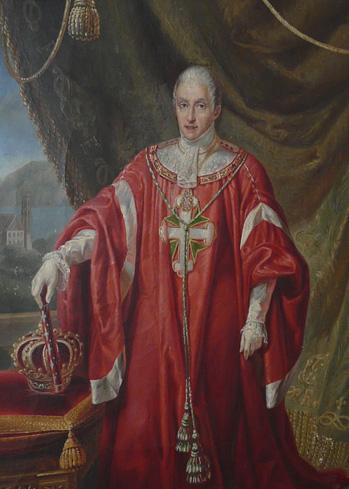
Charles Felix as the Grand Master of the Order of Saints Maurice and Lazarus

Charles Emmanuel IV was childless and, after the death of his wife, he abdicated in favour of his brother Victor Emmanuel I on 4 June 1802. The latter did not take possession of the domains in Sardinia himself, preferring to entrust them to Charles Felix as viceroy.

Charles Felix's government of Sardinia was rather rigid and authoritarian. Since the Sardinian revolutionary movements in 1794, the island had experienced a period of disorder, exacerbated by widespread poverty, which had led to an increase in crime, which the viceroy suppressed with notable harshness, writing to his brother the king, "slaughter, slaughter, for the good of the human race."

Charles Felix established a military regime, such that his Sardinian subjects referred to him as "Carlo Feroce" (Charles the Ferocious). The tool of this regime was the special court of the Viceregal delegation for the investigation of political proceedings, which took action immediately against the "capopolo" (popular leader), Vincenzo Sulis, who was guilty of nothing other than having been more successful than the viceroy in defeating the revolutionary movements. When Sulis was condemned to twenty years in jail, the viceroy considered it a lenient sentence. Furthermore, in the persecution of "state criminals," Charles Felix legitimated the adoption of military procedures and granted every power to the police, from spying to censoring letters and placing bounties on suspects.

In his reorganisation work, however, he displayed notable energy to control the autonomy of the judiciary and the local bureaucracy and managed to correct some abuses of the feudal regime.

In fact, when the Stamenti, the parliament of the kingdom, voted to pay a tax of 400,000 lire, Charles Felix exerted significant pressure to have the poorest classes exempted from the tax and he judged disputes in feudal jurisdiction in favour of vassals rather than feudal lords. When an anti-feudal revolt took place against the Duke of Asinara, who had refused to conform to the regulations of the viceroy, Charles Felix decided to punish both the duke, who was stripped of his property, as well as the revolutionaries.

Despite the precarious political and social situation, Charles Felix was able to bring some improvements to the agriculture and economy of the island. Under his rule, an agrarian society and an office for the administration of Crown mines and forests were established. Additionally, the farming of olives was encouraged and commercial contracts were granted to encourage local production. Finally, he began a project to systematise the road network.

== Marriage and return to Turin (1814–1821) ==
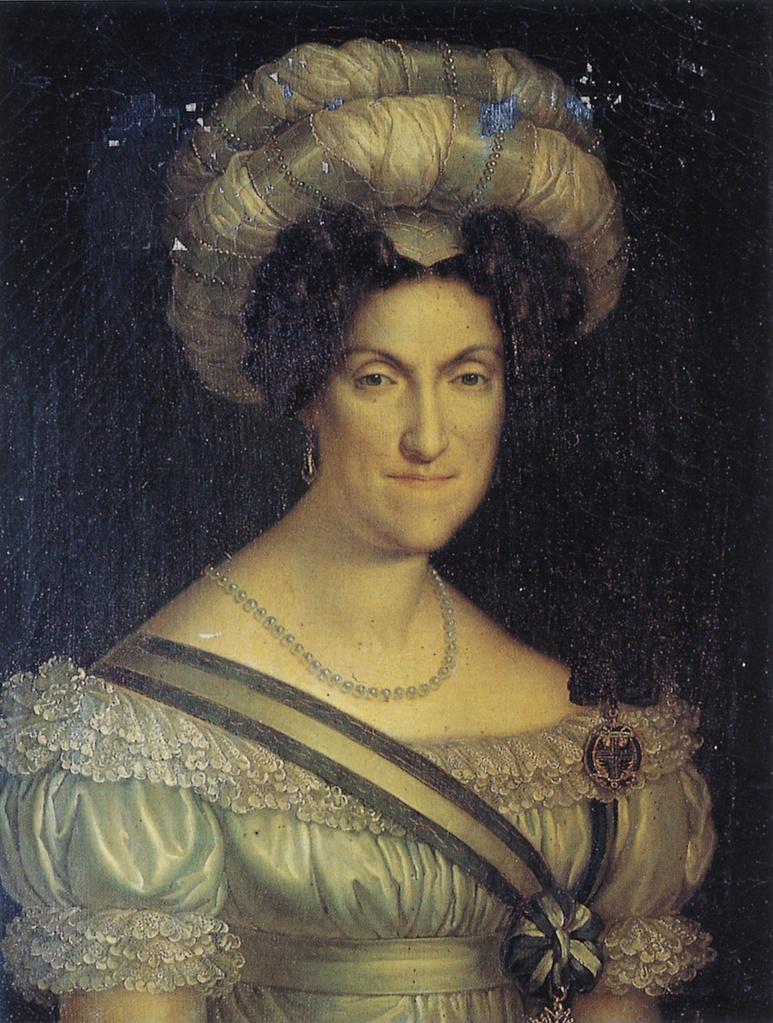
Maria Cristina of Naples, wife of Charles Felix and queen of Sardinia

On 7 March 1807, in the Cappella Palatina of the Palazzo dei Normanni in Palermo, Charles Felix married by proxy Maria Cristina of Naples and Sicily (17 January 1779 – 11 March 1849), daughter of Ferdinand IV King of Naples and Sicily and Maria Carolina of Austria.

The marriage, which had originally been opposed by Charles Felix, had been arranged for dynastic reasons. Neither Charles Emmanuel nor Victor Emmanuel had male children (the son of the latter had become sick and died in Sardinia), while the Duke of Montferrat and the Count of Morian were deceased, so Charles Felix had become the heir presumptive and therefore had to produce a male heir.

Although the marriage to Maria Cristina proved harmonious, she was unable to have children, forcing Victor Emmanuel to consider the succession of Charles Albert, Prince of Carignano, from a collateral line of the House of Savoy.

After the fall of Napoleon and the return of Victor Emmanuel to Turin on 20 May 1814, Charles Felix joined him for a brief period before returning to Sardinia the following year with his wife. He formally retained the role of Viceroy until 1821, although he returned to the court in Turin after a short period.

== Revolution of 1821 ==
=== Origin ===
Following revolts in Cádiz in 1820, King Ferdinand VII of Spain was forced to restore the Spanish Constitution of 1812 and the hope of obtaining similar concessions from their own sovereigns arose in many European states. Insurrections broke out in Naples and Palermo.

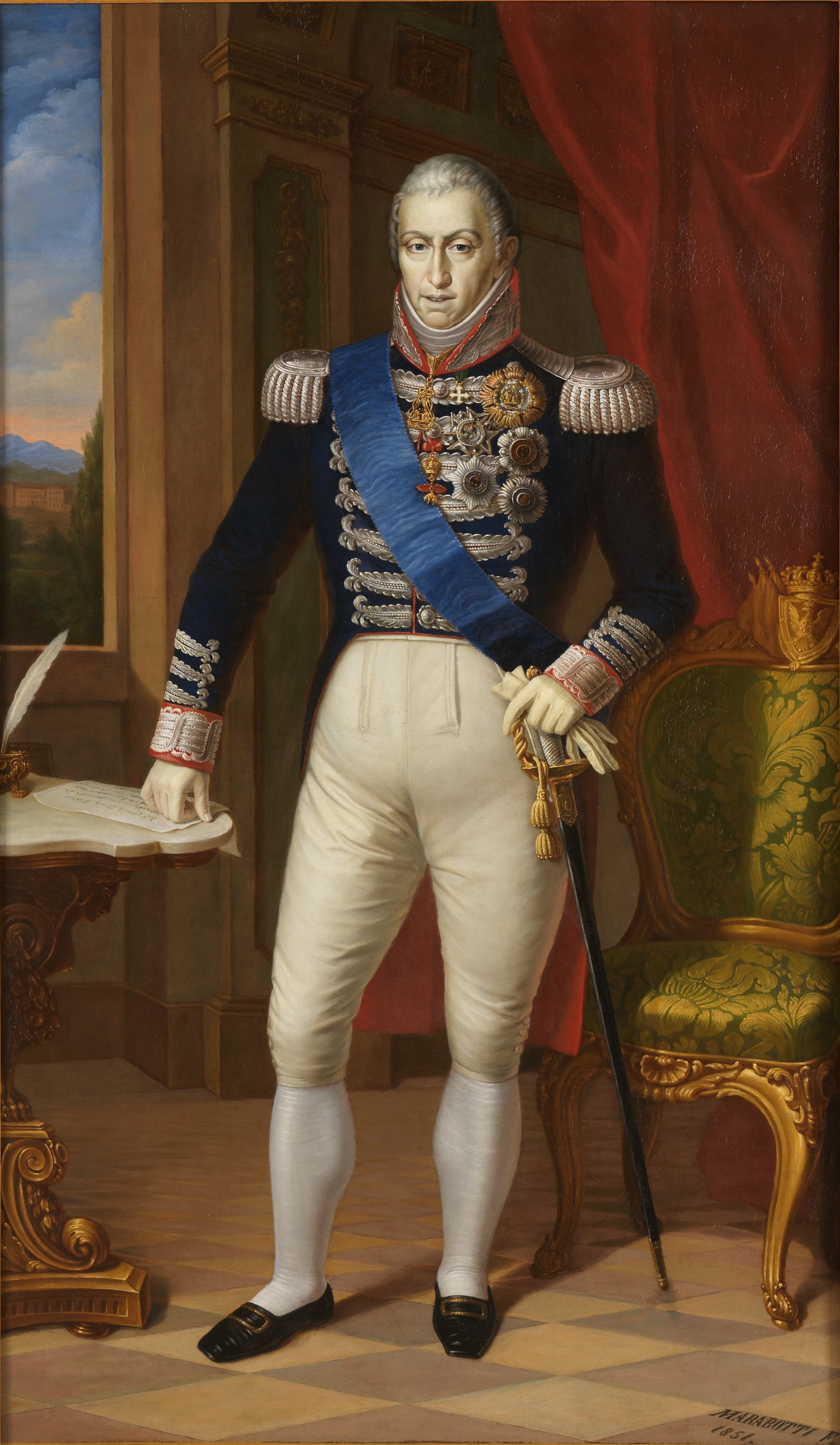
Posthumous portrait by Francesco Marabotti, c. 1851

The initial indications of the crisis were confirmed on 11 January 1821 when four students were stopped by the police at a theatre performance in Turin because they were wearing red caps with black bows, a symbol of the carboneria. The young men offered resistance and were arrested, provoking a large brawl.

The next day, all the students and many of their teachers protested, calling for the release of the youths and, when this was refused, they blockaded themselves in the university and the government was forced to call in the army. Although nobody was killed, the wounded were very numerous and the situation escalated.

A connection was made between the protestors and the secret society of the "Federati", whose leaders Santorre di Rossi, Giacinto Collegno, Carlo Emanuele Asinari, and Guglielmo Moffa di Lisio Gribaldi (all soldiers, officials, or sons of ministers) and Roberto d'Azeglio met with Charles Albert on 6 March. They were ready to act, having identified the prince as a new man for the House of Savoy, who might be willing to break with the absolutist past.

The goal of the conspirators was not to abolish the House of Savoy, but to induce it to enact political and social reforms and then undertake a war against Austria, which seemed possible in light of the deeply anti-Austrian sentiments of the Victor Emmanuel I.

In this, the conspirators took advantage of the absence of Charles Felix, who they thought would have been able to induce Victor Emmanuel to oppose their plans. They planned to raise the army, surround the royal residence at Moncalieri castle and force him to grant a constitution and declare war on Austria. The role of Charles Albert would have been to mediate between the conspirators and the king, but the following morning, he changed his mind and attempted to escape from the conspirators, although he did not disavow them.

=== Beginning of the revolt ===
The conspirators grew suspicious and prepared to cancel the insurrection which they had planned for the 10th. The same day, Charles Albert, completely penitent, raced to Moncalieri in order to confess everything to Victor Emmanuel and beg for pardon. In the night the garrison of Alessandria, commanded by one of the conspirators, Guglielmo Ansaldi, rebelled and occupied the city. Although they had been abandoned by the Prince, the rest of the revolutionaries decided to act at this point.

=== Abdication of Victor Emmanuel and regency of Charles Albert ===
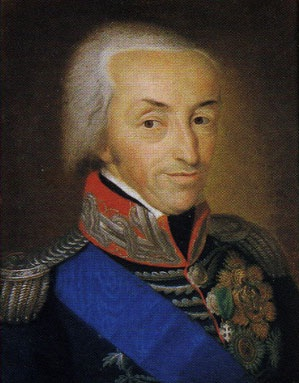
Victor Emmanuel I, who abdicated in favour of Charles Felix after the rebellion of 1821

On Sunday 11 March 1821, King Victor Emmanuel I met with the Crown Council, of which Charles Albert was a member. As a result of the king's indecision, no action was taken.

On 12 March, the Citadel of Turin fell into the hands of the rebels. Victor Emmanuel encouraged Charles Albert and Cesare Balbo to negotiate with the Carbonari, who refused to listen to their messages. Thus, in the evening, in the face of the spreading military uprising, the king abdicated in favour of his brother Charles Felix. Since the latter was in Modena at the time, Charles Albert was appointed regent.

The abdication of the king, which followed the dismissal of the ministers of state, led to chaos because it created a dynastic crisis which foreign powers would not ignore and because it split the army and bureaucracy, preventing every possibility of maintaining order.

The regent tried to take control by naming a new government (the lawyer, Ferdinando del Pozzo (1768–1843) as Minister of the Interior, general Emanuele Pes di Villamarina as minister of war, and Lodovico Sauli d'Igliano as minister of foreign affairs) and attempted to negotiate with the rebels, but he achieved nothing.

Given the impossibility of taking any decisions without the agreement of the new king, Charles Albert sent Charles Felix an account of the events, seeking instructions, but the letter took a very long time to reach its destination.

Fearful of becoming the object of popular anger, on the evening of 13 March 1821, Charles Albert signed a decree granting a constitution along the lines of the Spanish constitution of 1812, which would not become law until approved by the king.

The next day, the regent decided to form a junta, which was to protect the parliament. Two days after that, he swore to observe the Spanish Constitution, in a Savoyard version which had been slightly altered according to the requests of Victor Emmanuel's consort, Maria Therese.

=== Intervention of Charles Felix ===
At this point, Charles Felix, who had now received the letter from Charles Albert notifying him of his brother's abdication, decided to act. He told the messenger not to address him as "majesty", then asserted that since the abdication had been extracted through violence, it could not be considered valid."

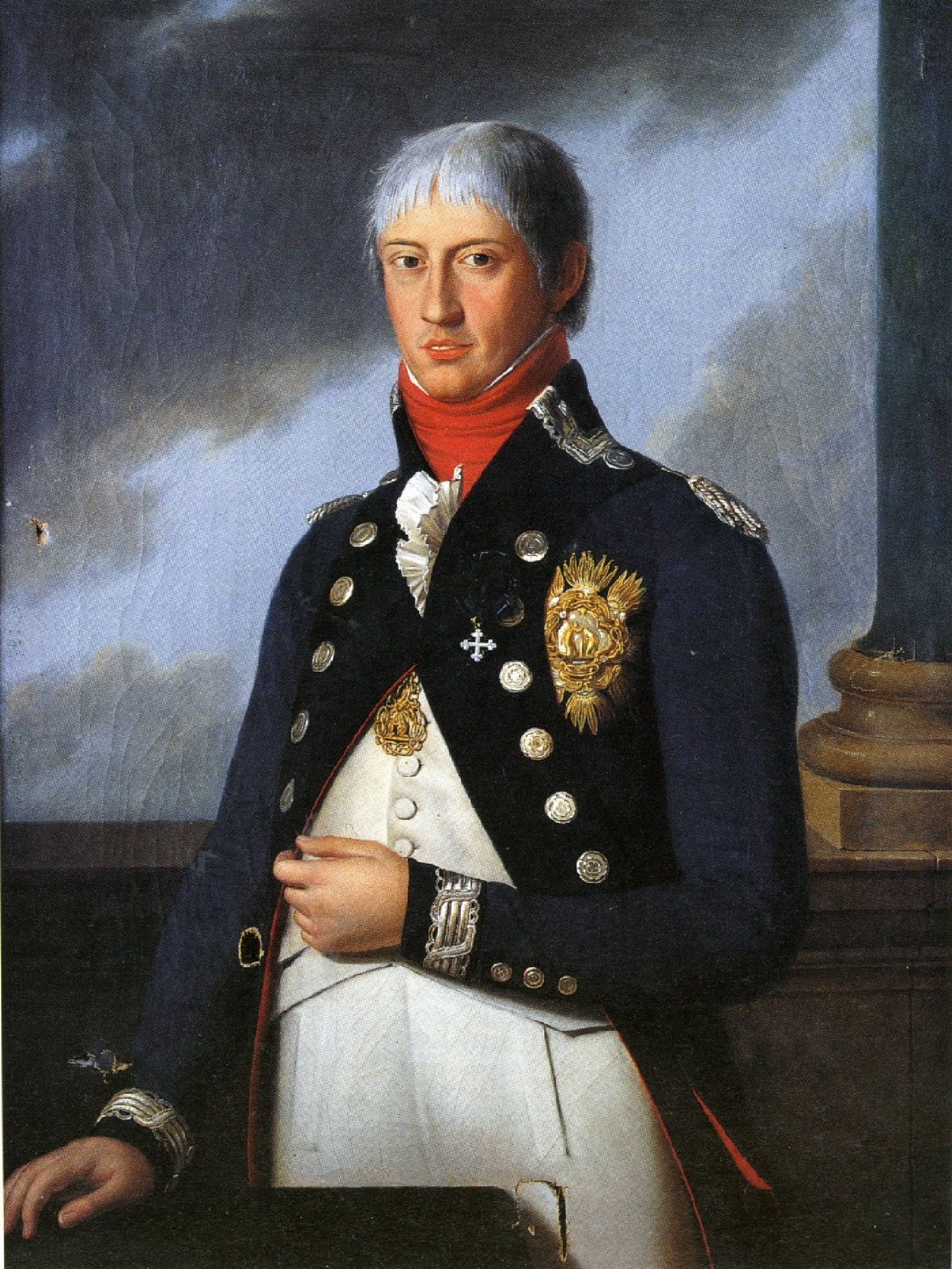
Portrait of Prince Charles Felix, c. 1820

As for the Spanish constitution, he declared any sovereign acts taken after the abdication of his brother to be null and void, and then he issued the following proclamation, "Far from consenting to any change in the pre-existing form of government with the nominal abdication of the king, our beloved brother, we consider all the royal subjects who have aided or abetted the traitors or who have presumed to proclaim a constitution, to be rebels."

Charles Albert, deeply discouraged, did as Charles Felix commanded, went to Novara, and issued a proclamation renouncing the regency and calling on everyone to submit to Charles Felix. On the 29th, he received a letter from Charles Felix ordering him to depart with his family for Florence.

With Charles Albert out of the way, Charles Felix dispatched several letters to Francis I of Austria, asking him to send troops in order to suppress the revolt.

On 3 April, he issued a second proclamation which granted a pardon to the soldiers while applying strict sanctions to rebel officials, which ultimately, prevented any form of compromise. Chancellor Metternich himself said to Francis IV of Modena that this proclamation had been imprudent and was written "with animosity, passion, and hatred."

The rebels, realising that no other option remained for them, marched on Novara, where the forces loyal to Charles Felix were gathered under the command of Vittorio Sallier de La Tour. This, inevitably, convinced Metternich to intervene.

On 8 April there was a battle (Noara-Borgo Vercelli) with the troops of de La Tour and then with those of the Austrian general Ferdinand von Bubna, who occupied Vercelli and Alessandria on 11 April, while de La Tour, who had received full powers from Charles Felix, occupied Turin on the 10th.

On 19 April, despite pressure from the emperors of Russia and Austria, Metternich, Charles Albert, Francis IV, and Charles Felix himself (who hated the idea of receiving the crown "thanks" to rebels), Victor Emmanuel reaffirmed his abdication. Thus, on 25 April, Charles Felix acceded to the throne.

=== Suppression ===
Once control of Turin was re-established, Charles Felix, who was still in Modena, entered into personal communication with the Emperor of Austria in order to obtain recognition from the Congress of Laibach, which was then in session, that he would be able to assume full control of his possessions, as an absolute monarch, and that Austria would not be allowed to interfere in any way in his territories.

At the subsequent Congress of Verona, Charles Felix feared pressure for constitutional changes and reiterated in his instructions to his ambassadors that the repression of the "revolutionary spirit" inspired by the Congress of Laibach belonged exclusively to him and that he was firmly convinced of the necessity of this obligation.

Having decided to remain at Modena, he appointed Ignazio Thaon di Revel as Lieutenant General of the Kingdom, and placed G. Piccono della Valle and G.C. Brignole in charge of foreign affairs and financial affairs respectively.

Finally, he began the suppression of opposition. The following extract from the work of Guido Astuti describes his actions:

The new king, Charles Felix, let loose a reaction with arbitrary repressive methods, using extraordinary commissions to judge the rebels and establishing political investigators in order to purge the army and the bureaucracy

— G. Astuti, Gli ordinamenti giuridici degli Stati sabaudi, p. 544.

Finally, the king instituted three different jurisdictions: a mixed civil and military tribunal called the Royal Delegation with penal powers, a military commission for investigating the conduct of officers and non-commissioned officers, and a scrutiny commission for investigating the conduct of every employee of the kingdom.

The Royal Delegation sat from 7 May to early October, in which time it issued 71 death sentences, 5 sentences of life imprisonment, and 20 sentences of imprisonment for 5 to 20 years. After the delegation's dissolution, the senate issued a further 24 death sentences, 5 sentences of life imprisonment, and another 12 sentences of imprisonment for 15–20 years. By the end of October the military commission had dismissed 627 officers.

The scrutiny commission, divided into a superior tribunal and seven divisional boards of scrutiny, issued numerous dismissals and suspensions of civil servants and professors of every kind of school, whom it found particularly culpable.

On the instructions of the minister of the interior, Roget de Cholex, the University of Turin was closed and many professors received severe admonitions because, as the king wrote in a letter to his brother (9 May 1822): "everyone who has studied at the university is entirely corrupt: the professors are detestable, but there is no way to replace them... Thus the bad are all taught and the good are all ignorant.".

In any case, although an oppressive climate was established, accompanied by the habituation to accusations and the diversity of political ideas, offering a pretext for pursuing private vendettas, the royal authority, especially the governor of Genoa, Giorgio Des Geneys, did not prevent people from fleeing. Of all the people who were condemned, only two were executed.

Further, it is reported by a letter of the Count d'Agliè that Charles Felix never prevented anyone from secretly passing subsidies to condemned men who had gone into exile and Angelo Brofferio reports that when the king discovered that one of these subsidies was going to the family of one of the two individuals who had been executed in 1821, the king doubled the sum.

The suppression of opposition was terminated on 30 September 1821, when Charles Felix issued a pardon of all individuals who had been implicated in the revolt, excluding the leaders, the financiers and those who had been found guilty of homicide or extortion. A few days later, Charles Felix entered Turin.

== Reign (1821–1831) ==
Even before he reached Turin, Charles Felix repudiated the Regent's promise and, to help restore order, he called in the Austrians, who stayed in Piedmont till 1823. In that same year, Charles Albert went to Spain to extinguish by force of arms the last sparks of revolt, making himself an object of hatred as the betrayer of Italian liberalism, but regaining the confidence of the King, who might have chosen another successor.

Charles Felix was a true reactionary, convinced that the world would soon be swept clean of all those - in his view - wicked and sacrilegious innovations introduced by the French Revolution and diffused throughout Europe by Napoleon Bonaparte "the rascal" as he called him.

=== Internal policy ===
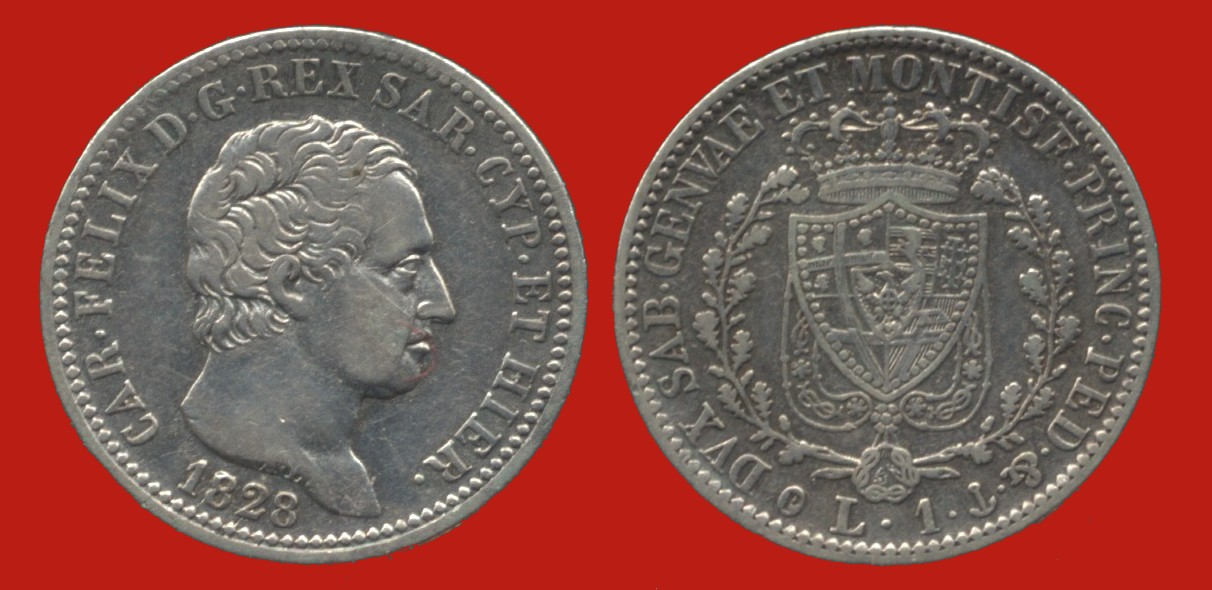
Charles Felix depicted on a 1 lira coin of 1828

Charles Felix was rarely present in Turin as king and did not participate in the social life of the capital, since he had never sought the throne and had no particular affection for the Turinese, whom he considered to have proven themselves traitors to the dynasty through their support for Napoleon and the constitutional protests.

In practice, he resided in Turin only during the theatre season and he spent the rest of the time travelling around Savoy, Nice, Genoa (one of his favourite residences) and the castles of Govone and Agliè, which he had inherited from his sister Maria Anna.

As a result, the king tended to delegate large amounts of power to his ministers, especially Count Roget de Cholex, Minister of the Interior, reserving a supervisory role for himself. His government was characterised by Massimo d'Azeglio as follows:

A despotism full of straight and honest intentions but its representatives and arbiters were four old chamberlains, four old maids of honour, with a hive of friars, priests, monks, and jesuits.

— Massimo d'Azeglio, citato in Montanelli, L'Italia Giacobina e Carbonara, p. 344.

Nevertheless, the king was not entirely unaware of the need for reform and certainly exerted himself in the defense of the Piedmontese realm from Pontifical and foreign intervention. He limited the privileges and exemptions of the church, which seemed harmful to the state, almost completely abolished the right of sanctuary in holy places, granted secular courts the right to hear cases against priests, and imposed civic oversight of catechisms, sermons, and religious books.

Regarding the issue of church property which had been secularised in 1792 (with Papal consent) and Franciscan property which had been secularised unilaterally, the king appointed an extraordinary board composed of officials and supporters of the clergy. The proposals, delivered to Pope Leo XII by ambassador-extraordinary Filiberto Avogadro di Collobiano in December 1827, were examined by a council of cardinals, who rejected some financial details and the right of the state to dispose of the property freely. However, on 1 April 1828, the king summoned a new council, to which he professed flexibility on the financial issues and rigidity on the issue of disposal. The resulting agreement was approved on 14 May 1828 by the Holy See.

There were also important legislative reforms, which were effected by the Edict of 16 July 1822, which reformed mortgages; the Edict of 27 August 1822, which unified the military penal law; and the Edict of 27 September 1822, which reformed the judicial system. These changes were capped by the Civil and Criminal Laws of the Kingdom of Sardinia, signed on 16 January 1827, which replaced the dated Carta de Logu.

Charles Felix, like every man of the Restoration, which simultaneously included both reactionaries and reformers, had had a great variety of experiences and appeared to oscillate between the open revival of eighteenth-century despotism, which had come to an end with the Napoleonic state, and historic innovations, which had little luck in Italy, however... On the one hand there was a typical effort to update dynastic absolutism, on the other hand there was substantial adoption of the French system - with exceptions and modifications.

— E. Genta, Eclettismo giuridico della Restaurazione, pp.357–362.

In fact, while Victor Emmanuel had implemented a rigid counter-revolution, which uncritically revoked every arrangement made by the French after the abdication of Charles Emmanuel IV, the state could not continue to ignore the will of the majority of its subjects who called for laws in accordance with the ideas and needs of their contemporary world. Some reforms to fill the gaps were necessary.

Thus, on 27 September 1822, after Charles Felix had re-established the publication of mortgages and codified the military penal law, he promulgated an Edict on the reform of the civil judicial system - excluding Sardinia.

The edict abolished a majority of the special jurisdictions (e.g. for gambling offences, or management of ports), instituted 40 collegial prefecture tribunals (which managed 416 "district courts"), with original jurisdiction, which were divided into four classes, according to the importance of the area, and he entrusted instruction of the procedures to special members of these tribunals. Civil and penal jurisdiction remained with the Senate in Turin and fiscal jurisdiction with the Court of Audit.

In addition, a single appellate jurisdiction was introduced, eliminating the multiplicity of appeals that had previously existed and the ministerial position of fiscal advocate was introduced.

Finally, he made the act of taking a case to court free, however inadequately, replacing the old system of the sportula, which was a very heavy judicial fee, calculated on the basis of the seriousness of the case, which provided the judges' pay, with a regular system of salaries paid by the state.

Another important change was the code of civil and criminal law of the Kingdom of Sardinia promulgated on 16 January 1827, mainly as a result of the work of the Count of Cholex. The code was prepared in Turin by the Supreme Council of Sardinia. It was then examined by an appropriate Sardinian committee and the Reale Udienza of Sardinia. The result was a confection of Sardinian and mainland sources, creating a law which was both traditional and novel.

The most novel changes relate to penal law: the abolition of the giudatico (impunity for criminals who had arrested other criminals) and the esemplarità (cruel extensions of the death penalty, like quartering the corpse and scattering the ashes); restrictions on the imposition of the death penalty; affirmation of the principle that the punishment should fit the crime; and the distinction between attempted crimes and crimes actually committed.

Finally, the slave trade was abolished and it was declared that any person who was found in captivity on a ship flying the Sardinian flag would instantly be freed.

=== Economic initiatives ===
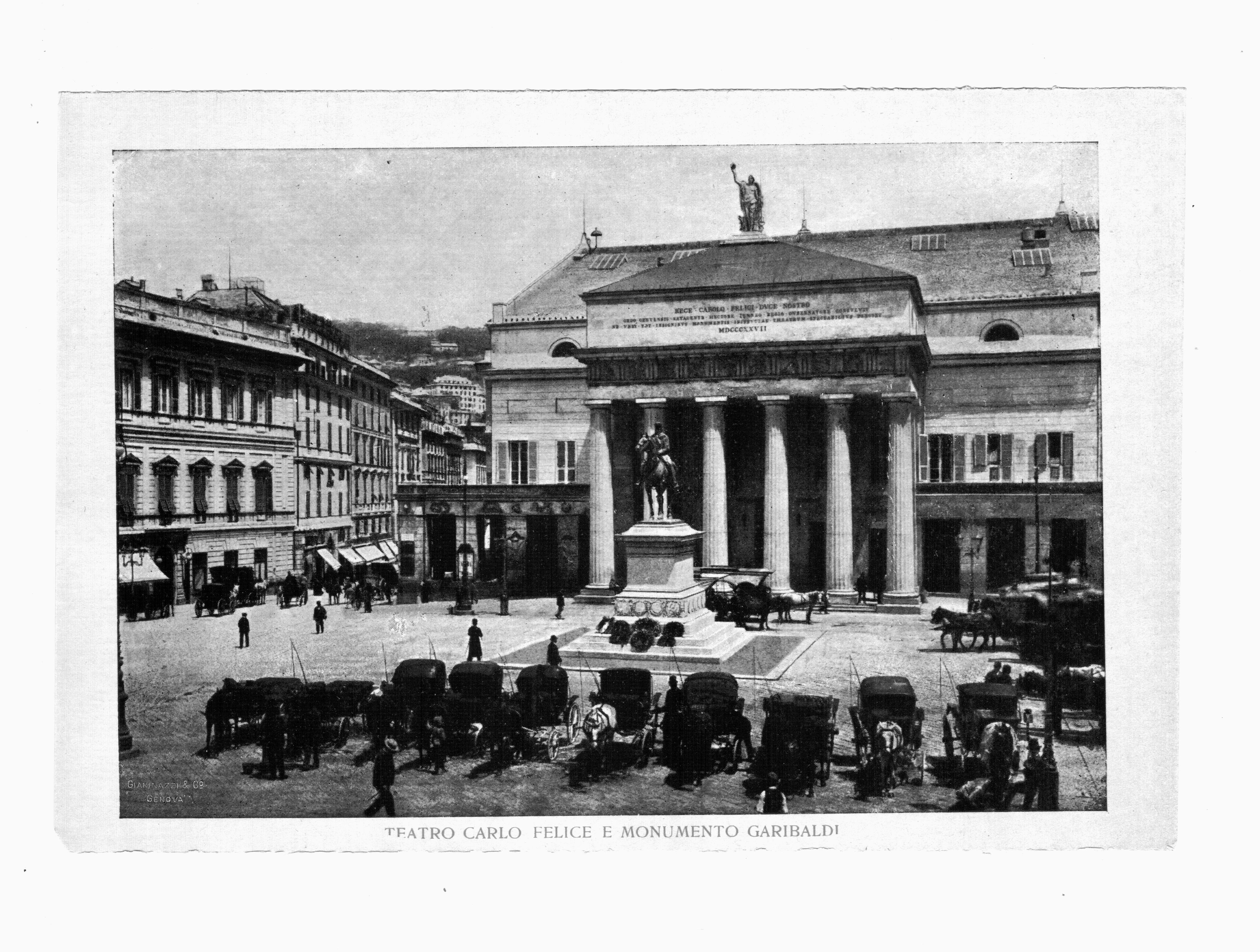
The Teatro Carlo Felice, Genoa

Charles Felix's reign was characterised by financial and economic difficulties and rigid protectionism, but there were some initiatives relating to services and public works.

The road network was improved by the construction of the road between Cagliari and Sassari (now Strada statale 131 Charles Felix) and between Genoa and Nice, as well as bridges over the Bormida and the Ticino (the latter completed in 1828). A large number of public buildings were constructed in the cities: the port of Nice was largely restored, Genoa received a theatre (the Teatro Carlo Felice, named after the king), and Turin benefited from a programme of urban improvement which included the bridge over the Dora, the Piazza Carlo Felice, underground drainage channels, the porticos of the Piazza Castello and various new suburbs.

Charles Felix paid attention to the steelworking sector, which had already occupied him as Viceroy, as well as the banking and insurance sectors, which were improved significantly by the creation of the Cassa di Risparmio di Torino in 1827 and the establishment of the Royal Mutual Society of Insurers in June 1829. He also encouraged the agricultural and manufacturing sector by granting many exemptions and fiscal benefits and through the creation of trade fairs like that of 1829, in which 500 exhibitors participated.

=== Foreign policy ===
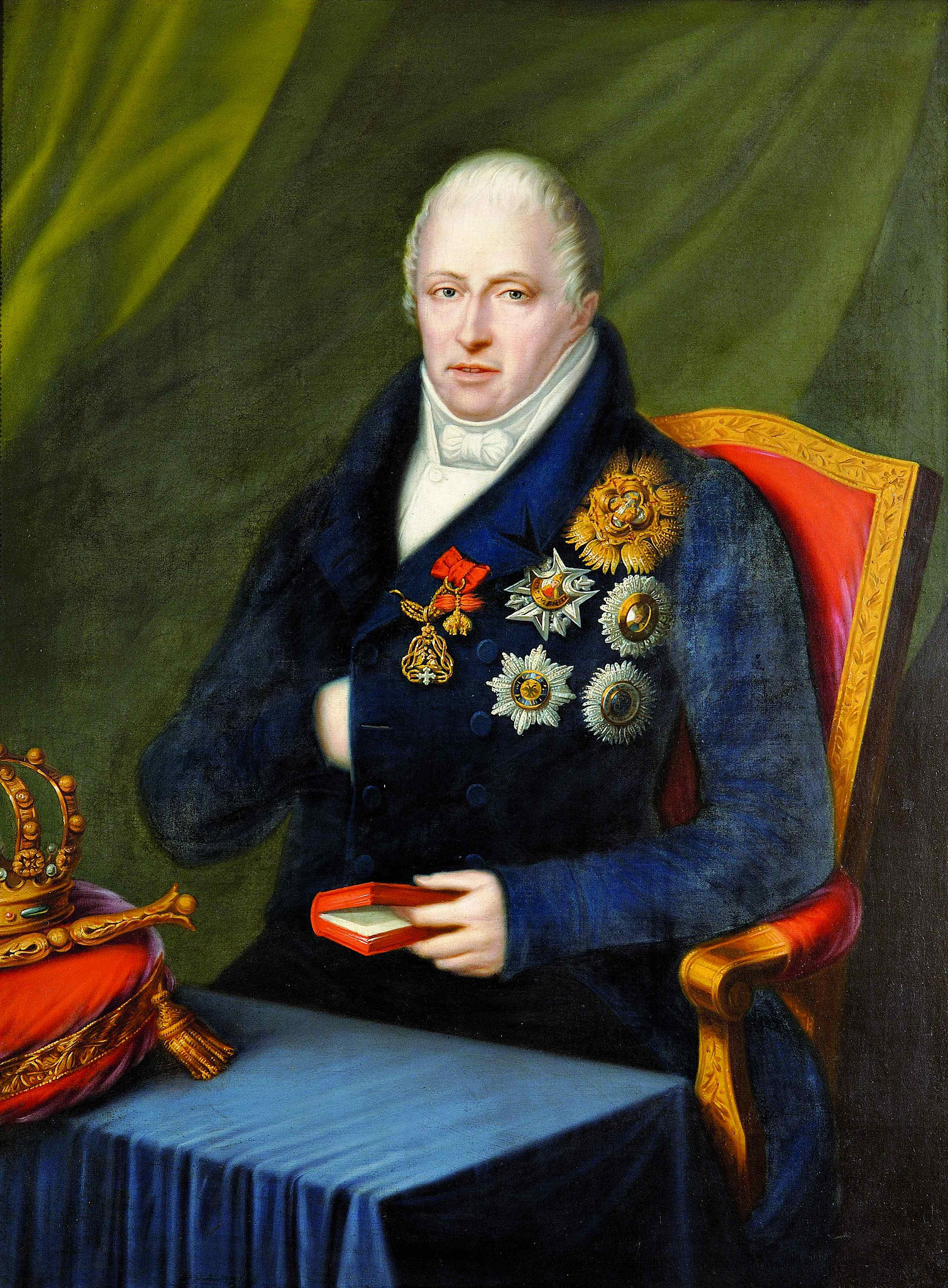
Portrait of King Charles Felix, c. 1825

Theoretically, Charles Felix was committed to the territorial expansion of his realm, but he did not maintain any expansionist illusions and preferred to concentrate on the economic and commercial interests of his realm. Thus in 1821, with the help of the Austrians and English, he signed an advantageous trade agreement with the Sublime Porte.

In September 1825, in order to force the Bey of Tripoli to observe the treaty established with him in 1816 under English auspices, and to respect Sardinian ships sailing along the coast of North Africa, he launched a demonstration of force. Towards the end of the month, two frigates (Commercio and Cristina), a corvette (Tritone) and a brig (Nereide) under the command of captain Francesco Sivori, appeared off the coast of Tripoli. After a final attempt to pressure the Bey diplomatically, ten Sardinian longboats sailed into the harbour on the night of 27 September and set fire to a Tripolitanian brig and two schooners, routing or killing the Tripolitanian troops. This forced the Bey to take a more conciliatory approach.

In 1828, he ended the construction of a bridge over the River Ticino at Boffalora, which had been begun by his brother Victor Emmanuel I some years earlier as a result of a treaty with the Emperor of Austria, who controlled the other side of the river as part of the Kingdom of Lombardy–Venetia.

=== Patronage ===
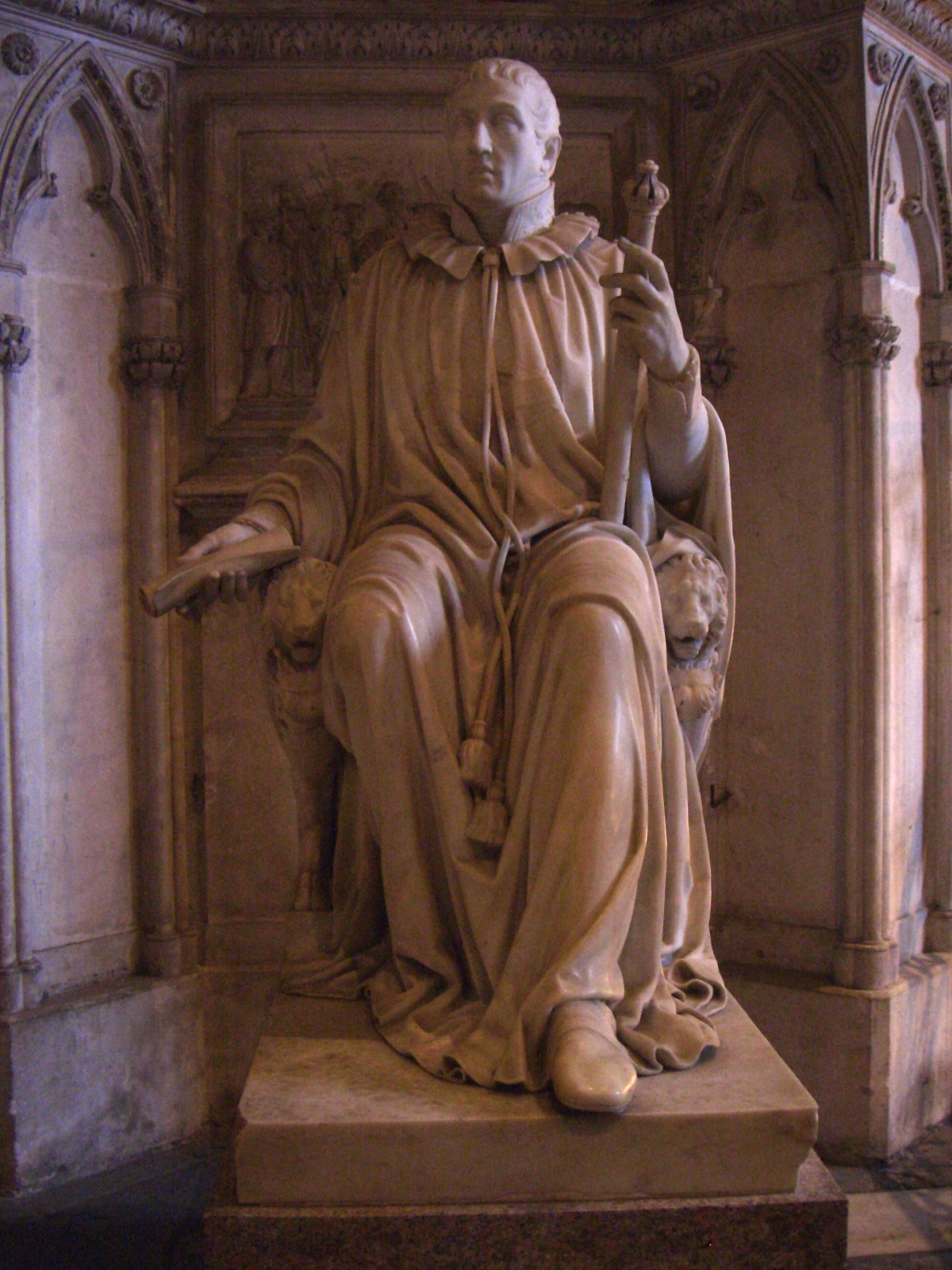
Tomb of Charles Felix, Hautecombe Abbey

Charles Felix was an avid patron of art and culture. In 1824, he acquired Hautecombe Abbey, where many of his ancestors were buried and entrusted a restoration programme to the architect Ernesto Melano.

In the same year, he was responsible for the acquisition of a good part of the collection which now constitutes the Museo Egizio in Turin. The pieces were acquired from Bernardino Drovetti, a native of Barbania, who was then the French consul in Egypt. The collection was placed in the Palazzo dell'Accademia delle Scienze, which is still the site of the museum.

In 1827, Charles Felix instituted the Chamber of Commerce and the School of Palaeography and Diplomacy, affiliated with the Academy of Painting and Sculpture.

== Death and succession ==
Charles Felix died without issue on 27 April 1831, in Turin at the Palazzo Chablais which had been given to him by his sister Princess Maria Anna, Duchess of Chablais, after a reign of ten years. He was buried at Hautecombe Abbey in Savoy, where his wife was also buried in 1849. With his death, the main line of the House of Savoy became extinct. He was succeeded by the senior male member of the House of Savoy-Carignano, the regent Charles Albert (1798–1849). The selection of Charles Albert as successor had not been made willingly, since Charles Albert had shown himself to be inclined to liberalism and friendly to the carbonari.

== Legacy ==
The Teatro Carlo Felice in Genoa is named for him. The principal road of the island of Sardinia, the Strada statale 131 Carlo Felice, which connects the towns of Cagliari and Sassari-Porto Torres, constructed in the 19th century, is named for him. At the Cagliari end of that road there is a statue of him, pointing to the city. It is the typical prop for the celebrations of Cagliari Calcio fans, being decked with cloaks and flags in the team's colours of red and blue whenever the team is promoted or escapes relegation.

Charles Felix of Sardinia House of Savoy Born: 6 April 1765 Died: 27 April 1831
Regnal titles
Preceded by Victor Emmanuel I	King of Sardinia; 1821–1831	Succeeded by Charles Albert
