= Portrait of Princess Maria Christina =

Painting by Élisabeth Vigée Le Brun

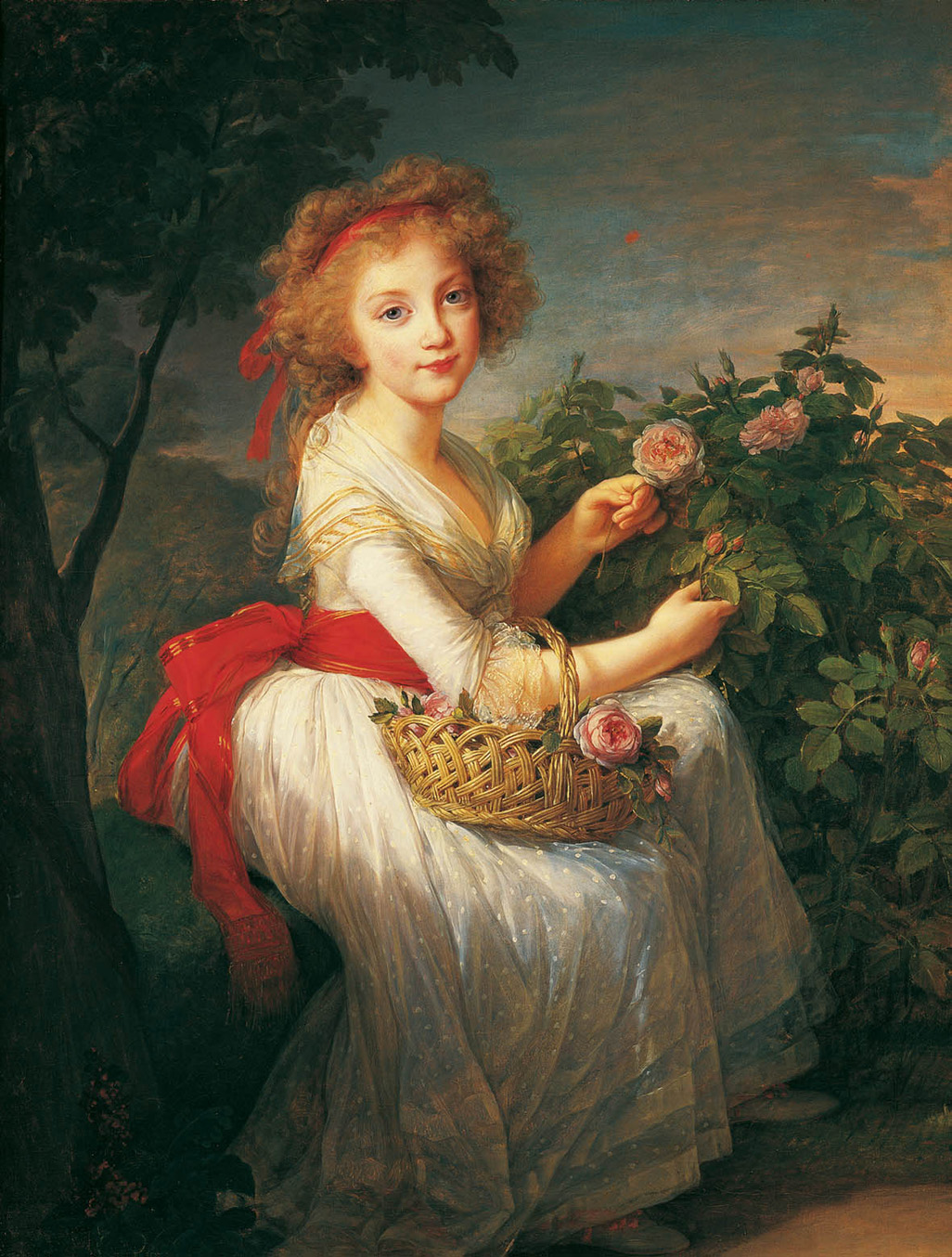
- Artist: Élisabeth Vigée Le Brun
- Year: c. 1790
- Medium: Oil on canvas
- Dimensions: 120 cm × 94 cm (47 in × 37 in)
- Location: National Museum of Capodimonte, Naples

Portrait of Princess Maria Christina is an oil-on-canvas painting executed c. 1790 by Élisabeth Vigée Le Brun. Vigée Le Brun had taken refuge in Naples after fleeing Paris in 1789 during the French Revolution. The portrait is now in the National Museum of Capodimonte, in Naples.

== History and description ==
The painting was commissioned by Maria Christina's parents Maria Carolina of Austria and Ferdinand I of the Two Sicilies, who decided to entrust the artist, who had fled to Naples, after the French Revolution, with the portraits of their four children.

Princess Maria Cristina is depicted in a light and relaxed atmosphere, despite the political instability of the time. The princess appears with her natural hair, tied back in a red ribbon, dressed in a simple and modest dress, with a red ribbon at her waist, in a country pose, picking roses. This gives the painting a light and refreshing tone, avoiding the formalism typical of the court paintings.
