= Maria Anna of Savoy, Duchess of Chablais =

Maria Anna of Savoy
- Duchess of Chablais
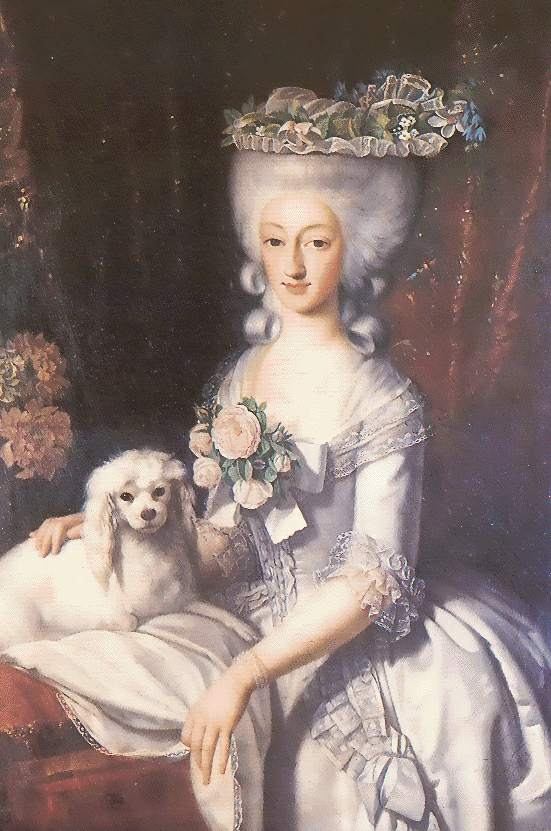
- Born: 17 December 1757; Royal Palace, Turin
- Died: 11 October 1824 (aged 66); Palazzina di caccia of Stupinigi, Turin
- Burial: Royal Basilica, Turin, Italy
- Spouse: Benedetto, Duke of Chablais (m. 1775; died 1808)
Names
- Maria Anna Carolina Gabriella di Savoia
- House: House of Savoy
- Father: Victor Amadeus III of Savoy
- Mother: Maria Antonia Ferdinanda of Spain

Maria Anna of Savoy (Maria Anna Carolina Gabriella; 17 December 1757 – 11 October 1824) was a Princess of Savoy by birth and Duchess of Chablais by her marriage to her uncle, Prince Benedetto, Duke of Chablais.

== Early life ==
Born at the Royal Palace of Turin, she was the sixth child of Prince Victor Amadeus, Duke of Savoy and, since 1773, King of Sardinia, by his wife, Maria Antonia Ferdinanda of Spain, as daughter of Philip V.

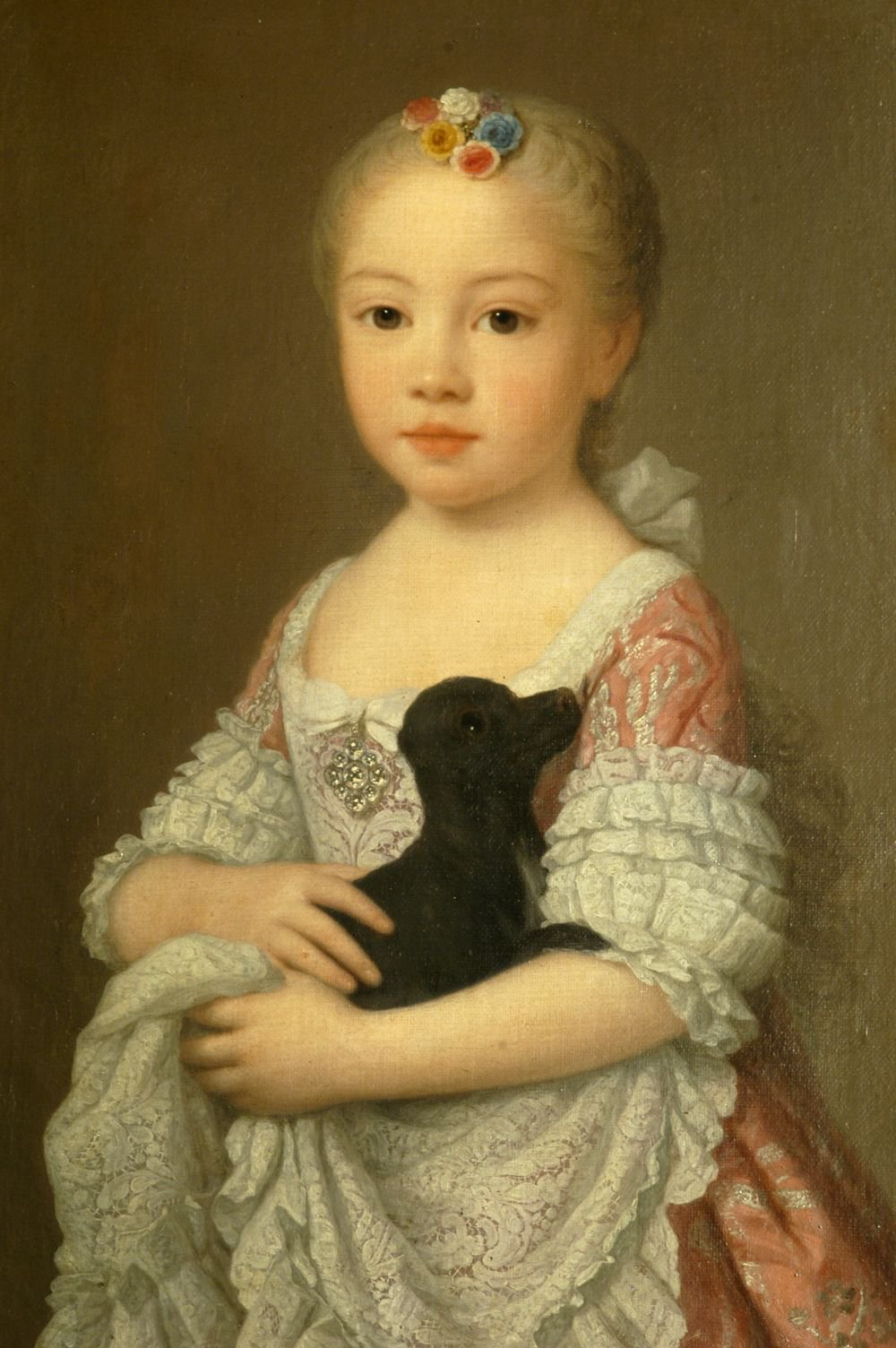
Portrait by Domenico Duprà, 1762

Maria Anna was the fourth but third surviving daughter of her parents. Her two older sisters were the future "granddaughters in law" of Louis XV, Princess Maria Giuseppina, who married the future Louis XVIII in 1771 and Princess Maria Teresa, who married the future Charles X in 1773. Their younger surviving sister, Maria Carolina, married Anthony of Saxony.

Three of her brothers were the last three Kings of Sardinia from the senior line of the House of Savoy: the future Charles Emmanuel IV, Victor Emmanuel I and Charles Felix. After the death of the last one in 1831 without issue, the throne passed to Charles Albert, Prince of Carignano and next legitimate male heir.

== Marriage ==
After the weddings of her older sisters to French Princes, was arranged the marriage between Maria Anna and her paternal half-uncle Prince Benedetto, Duke of Chablais, younger half-brother of Victor Amadeus III (as the son of Charles Emmanuel III and his last wife, Elisabeth Therese of Lorraine). The wedding took place on 19 March 1775 at the Chapel of the Holy Shroud in Turin. They had no children but had a happy union: although they were close, Maria Anna always saw him as her uncle. Their official residence were the Palazzo Chiablese and the Ducal Castle of Agliè. She had good relationships with her sisters-in-law Marie Clotilde of France, Princess of Piedmont and Maria Theresa of Austria-Este, Duchess of Aosta.

When in December 1798 the Republic of France invaded the Kingdom of Sardinia, the whole royal family went into exile. The Duke and Duchess of Chablais left Turin and moved to Sardinia, where they remained until the end of 1799. Then they left the island and settled in Rome at the Papal States. In 1805, they spent a few months in Florence as guests at King Louis I of Etruria, and his wife Queen Maria Luisa.

In Italy, the Duke of Chablais was given control of the Army of Italy which contained French troops and intended on restoring the monarchy in France after the execution of Louis XVI in 1793. He took part in the Battle of Loano.

Benedetto, Duke of Chablais died on 4 January 1808 in Rome. In 1816 the now Dowager Duchess of Chablais received her younger brother Charles Felix their cousin Charles Albert. By that time, the states and properties of the House of Savoy where recovered; during Maria Anna's absence, the Palazzo Chiablese was used by Camillo Borghese, 6th Prince of Sulmona and his wife, the famous Pauline Bonaparte. However, Maria Anna didn't return to her homeland immediately: in 1820 she acquired the Villa Rufinella in Frascati near Rome, having bought the property from Lucien Bonaparte. In 1822, despite protests from her brother and cousin, Maria Anna settled in Florence, despite the fact that the city actively participated in the period of unrest in the Kingdom of Sardinia the previous year.

== Death ==
Only at the beginning of 1824 Maria Anna returned to Piedmont, where in the Castle of Moncalieri meet her brothers, the former King Victor Emmanuel I and the new monarch Charles Felix. In the summer of the same year, together with Charles Felix and his wife Maria Cristina she made a trip to Savoy, where they visited Hautecombe Abbey.

Maria Anna died at the Palazzina di caccia of Stupinigi in Turin in 1824 aged 66 and was buried at the Royal Basilica of Superga. She bequeathed all her properties, including the Palazzo Chiablese, the Ducal Castle of Agliè and the Villa Rufinella in Frascate, to her brother Charles Felix.

== Ancestry ==
Ancestors of Maria Anna of Savoy, Duchess of Chablais

8. Victor Amadeus II of Sardinia
4. Charles Emmanuel III of Sardinia
9. Anne Marie of Orléans
2. Victor Amadeus III of Sardinia
10. Ernest Leopold, Landgrave of Hesse-Rotenburg
5. Polyxena of Hesse-Rotenburg
11. Eleonore of Löwenstein-Wertheim-Rochefort
1. Maria Anna of Savoy
12. Louis, Dauphin of France
6. Philip V of Spain
13. Maria Anna Victoria of Bavaria
3. Maria Antonia Ferdinanda of Spain
14. Odoardo Farnese, Hereditary Prince of Parma
7. Elisabeth Farnese
15. Dorothea Sophie of the Palatinate
