= Prince Benedetto, Duke of Chablais =

Prince Benedetto
- Duke of Chablais
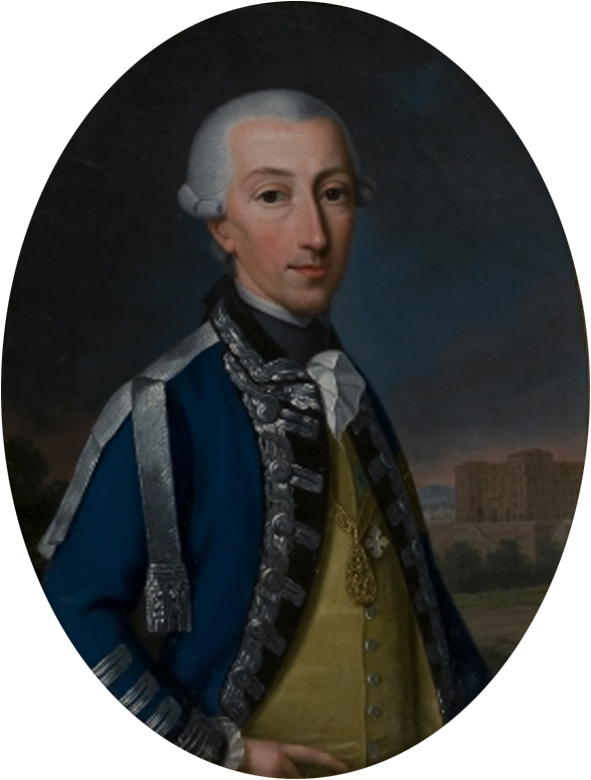
- Born: 21 June 1741; Palace of Venaria, Turin
- Died: 4 January 1808 (aged 66); Rome, Papal States
- Burial: Royal Basilica of Superga, Turin
- Spouse: Maria Anna of Savoy (m. 1775)
Names
- Benedetto Maria Maurizio di Savoia
- House: Savoy
- Father: Charles Emmanuel III of Sardinia
- Mother: Elisabeth Therese of Lorraine

Prince Benedetto, Duke of Chablais (Benedetto Maria Maurizio; 21 June 1741 - 4 January 1808) was an Italian nobleman and military leader. He was the youngest child of King Charles Emmanuel III of Sardinia. He married his half-niece Maria Anna of Savoy; they had no children. Benedetto was the owner of the Palazzo Chiablese in Turin.

== Biography ==
Chablais was born at the Palace of Venaria. He was the youngest child of Charles Emmanuel III of Sardinia and Elisabeth Therese of Lorraine. His mother died giving birth to him. He was named after Pope Benedict XIV who became pope the year before his birth.

Known alternatively as Benedetto or Maurizio, at the time of his birth, he was third in line to the Sardinian throne after his oldest half brother Victor Amadeus, Duke of Savoy and Prince Carlo his only full brother who died in early childhood. His paternal cousins included Louis XV, the future Ferdinand VI of Spain, and the Prince of Carignan. His maternal cousins included the future Queen of Naples and the famous Marie Antoinette.

His uncle Francis I, Holy Roman Emperor (Note: Husband of Empress Maria Theresa) proposed his daughter Archduchess Maria Christina of Austria as a prospective wife but the marriage between the two never materialised. The Emperor wanted the marriage to encourage ties between the House of Lorraine and the House of Savoy. (Note: Maria Christina later married the Duke of Teschen in 1766)

In 1753 his father gave what is now the Palazzo Chiablese as his personal residence. It was under Savoy that the building would be embellished under the direction of Benedetto Alfieri, a popular Savoyard architect of the era.

In 1763 his father granted him the Duchy of Chablais (the prince having been styled Duke of Chablais since birth), with the subsidiary lands of Cureggio, Trino, Dezan, Crescentino, Riva di Chieri, Well, Ghemme Pollenzo Tricerro, and Apertole Centallo. His brother, later Victor Amadeus III of Sardinia, created him Marquis of Ivrea on 19 June 1796. In 1764 Chablais also bought the fiefdom of Agliè, where the Ducal Palace of Agliè was situated, from his brother. Chablais also carried out improvements to the building under the direction of Ignatius Birago Borgaro.

Chablais married Maria Anna of Savoy at the Royal Palace of Turin on 19 March 1775. Maria Anna was his half-niece, and sixth child of his oldest half-brother Victor Amadeus III of Sardinia, (Note: who became king in 1773) and his consort Maria Antonietta of Spain. The marriage produced no children, Maria Anna dying in 1824.

Noted as a good soldier Chablais was given control of the Army of Italy which contained French troops and intended on restoring the monarchy in France after the execution of Louis XVI in 1793. (Note: Louis XVI's sister Clotilde de France was wife of Charles Emmanuel IV and queen consort since October 1796) He took part in the Battle of Loano.

He died in Rome aged 66 and was buried at the church of San Nicolo dei Cesarini then later moved to the Royal Basilica of Superga, Turin. At his death the title of Duke of Chablais reverted to the crown.

== Ancestry ==
Ancestors of Prince Benedetto, Duke of Chablais

8. Charles Emmanuel II, Duke of Savoy
4. Victor Amadeus II of Sardinia
9. Princess Marie Jeanne of Savoy-Nemours
2. Charles Emmanuel III of Sardinia
10. Philippe de France, Duke of Orléans =14
5. Anne Marie d'Orléans
11. Princess Henrietta of England
1. Prince Benedetto of Savoy
12. Charles V, Duke of Lorraine
6. Leopold, Duke of Lorraine
13. Eleonore of Austria, Queen of Poland
3. Elisabeth Therese of Lorraine
14. Philippe de France, Duke of Orléans =10
7. Élisabeth Charlotte d'Orléans
15. Elizabeth Charlotte of the Palatinate
