= Piazza Carlo Felice =

Square in Turin, Italy

Coordinates: 45°3′47.129″N 7°40′47.310″E

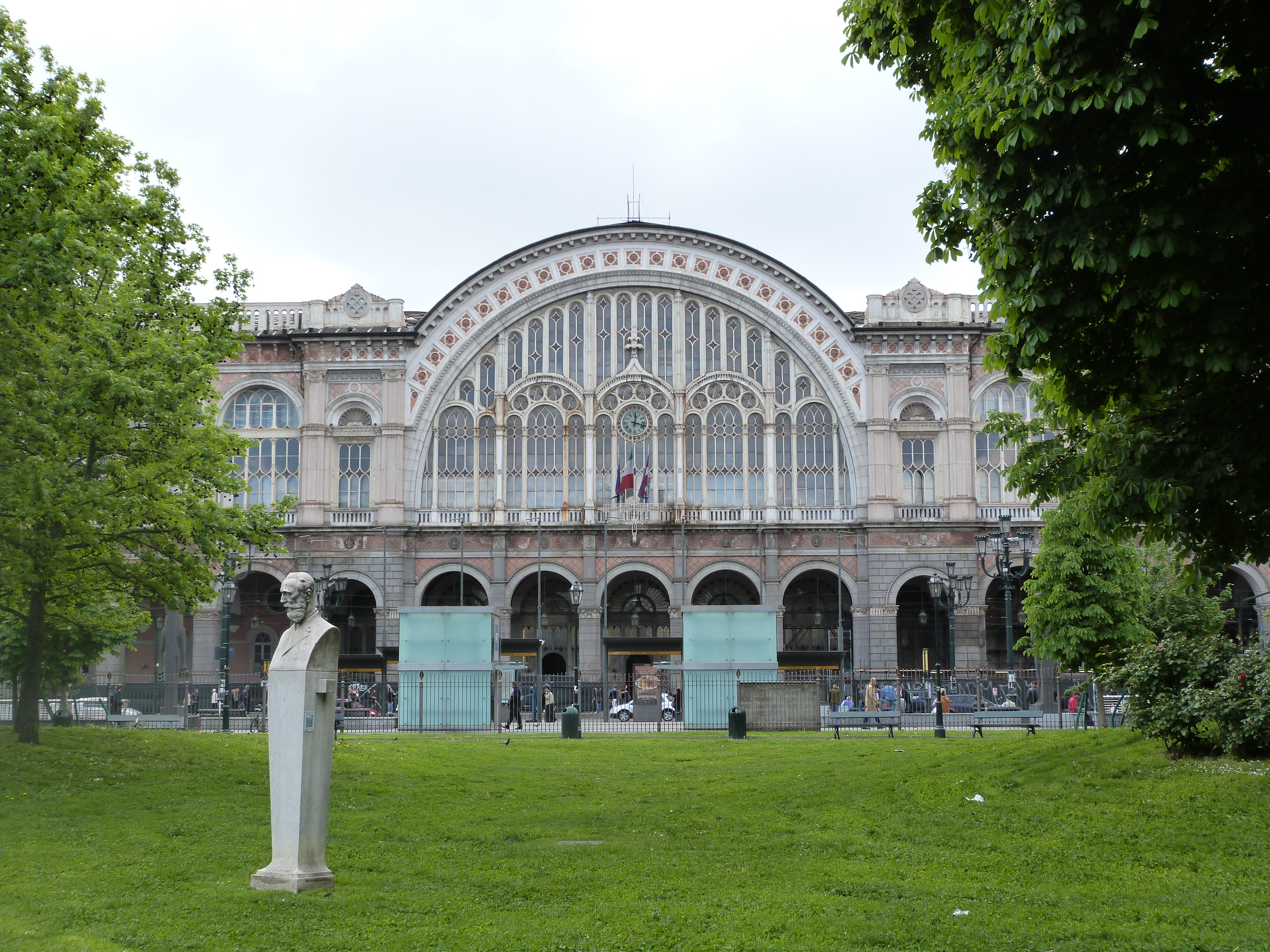
Piazza Carlo Felice

Piazza Carlo Felice is a city square in Turin, Italy.

There was a fire in 2021 that damaged a large building block in the square; three defendants went on trial for the crime of criminally negligent arson and one corporation for civil liability in 2025.

== Buildings around the square ==
The Torino Porta Nuova railway station is directly on the piazza. In the surrounding streets are several hotels and a Brek takeaway restaurant.

== See also ==
- Shroud of Turin
