= Maria Cristina of Naples and Sicily =

Queen of Sardinia from 1821 to 1831

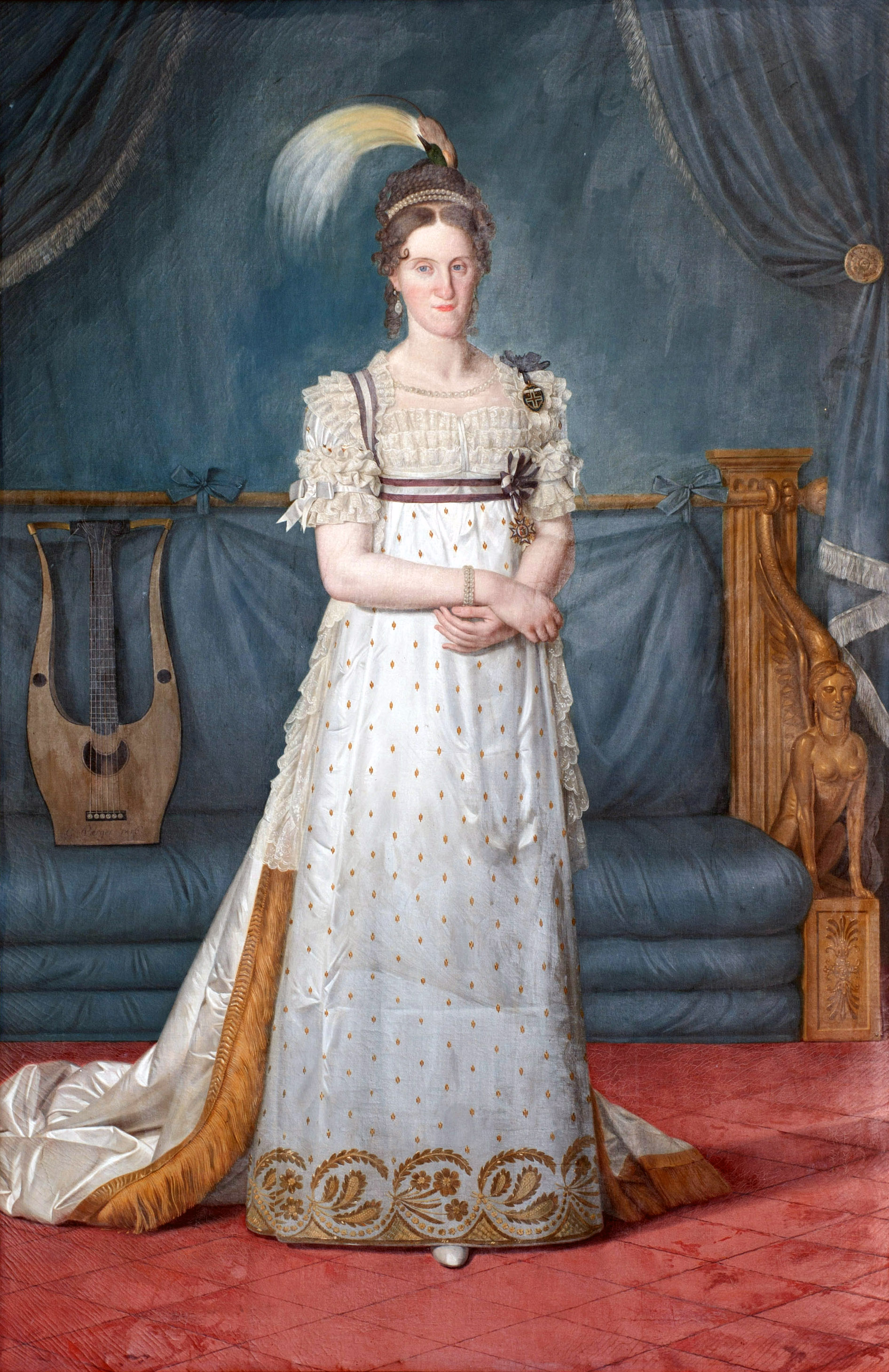
- Portrait of Maria Cristina in the Castle of Aglié, by Giacomo Berger (1816)

Queen consort of Sardinia
- Tenure: 12 March 1821 – 27 April 1831
- Born: 17 January 1779; Caserta Palace, Caserta, Kingdom of Naples
- Died: 11 March 1849 (aged 70); Savona, Kingdom of Sardinia
- Burial: Hautecombe Abbey, Saint-Pierre-de-Curtille
- Spouse: Charles Felix of Sardinia (m. 1807; died 1831)
Names
- Maria Cristina Amelia Teresa
- House: Bourbon-Two Sicilies
- Father: Ferdinand I of the Two Sicilies
- Mother: Maria Carolina of Austria

Maria Cristina of Naples and Sicily (Maria Cristina Amelia Teresa; 17 January 1779 – 11 March 1849) was a Princess of Naples and Sicily and later Queen of Sardinia as the wife of King Charles Felix. She was the daughter of Ferdinand I of the Two Sicilies and Maria Carolina of Austria.

== Princess of Naples and Sicily (1779–1807) ==
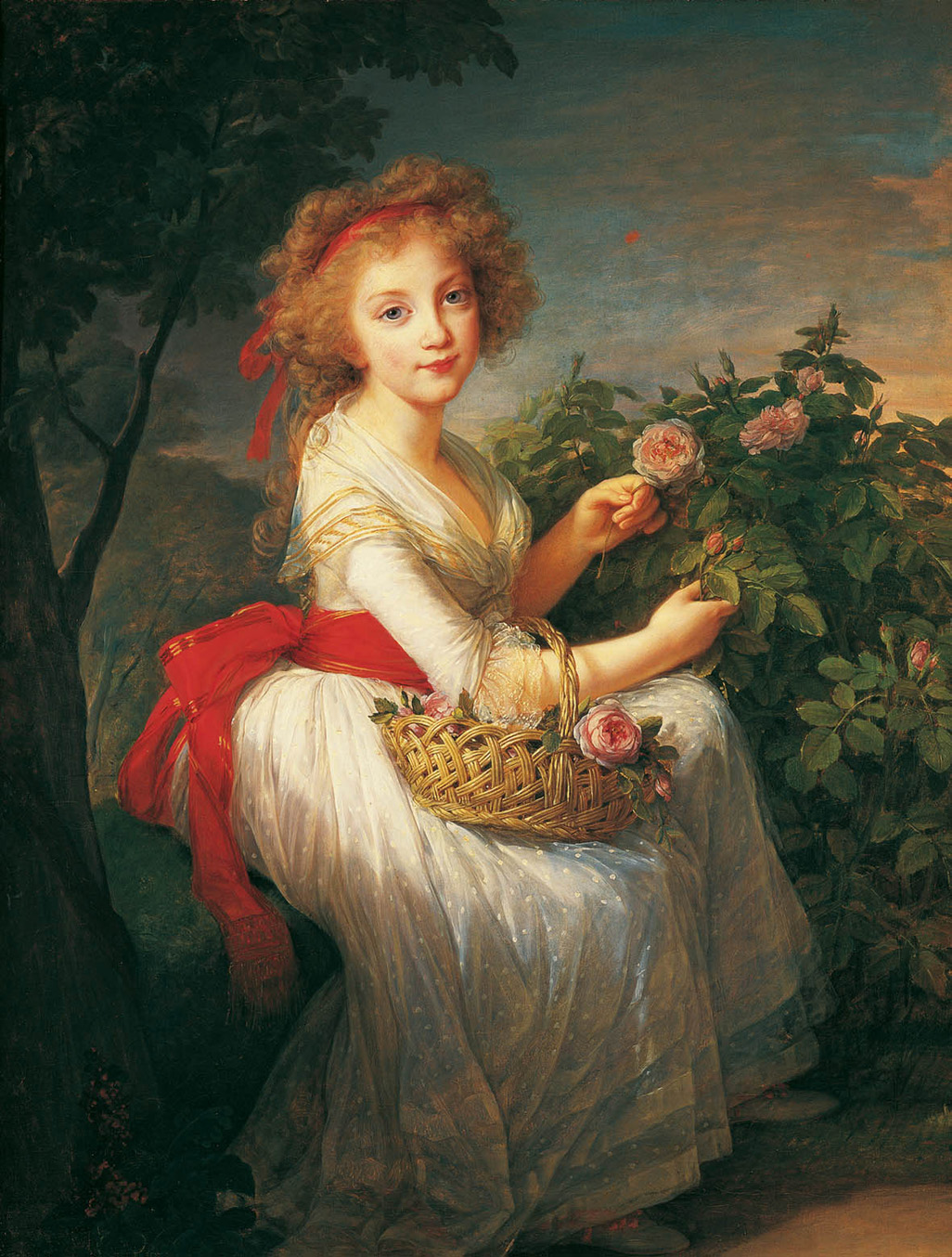
Portrait of Princess Maria Christina by Élisabeth Vigée Le Brun, circa 1790

Maria Cristina was born on 17 January 1779 at the Caserta Palace in Caserta. She was the sixth child and fourth daughter of King Ferdinand I of the Two Sicilies and his wife Maria Carolina of Austria, a daughter of Empress Maria Theresa of Austria. She was her mother's favourite child.

Her twin sister Maria Cristina Amelia died of smallpox on 26 February 1783, at the age of four.

== Duchess of Genoa (1807–1821) ==
Maria Cristina was married on 6 April 1807 in Palermo with Prince Charles Felix of Savoy, who became King of Sardinia when his elder brother Victor Emmanuel I abdicated in 1821. Until her husband became king, she was styled the Duchess of Genoa.

== Queen of Sardinia (1821–1831) ==
The royal couple were interested in the arts and artists, and turned the Royal House in Agliè and the Villa Rufinella in Frascati into comfortable residences. During her husband's reign, they lived at the Palazzo Chiablese, where her husband later died in 1831.

In 1825, the queen engaged the archaeologist Marquis Luigi Biondi (1776–1839), whose excavation work uncovered Tusculum, a project Maria Cristina financed. In 1839 and 1840, the architect and archaeologist Luigi Canina (1795–1856) was engaged by the royal family and excavated the Theatre area of Tusculum. The ancient works of art excavated were sent to the Duke of Savoy's Castle of Agliè in Piedmont.

Charles Felix died in 1831 after a reign of ten years. Maria Cristina lived the rest of her life in Turin, Naples, Agliè and Frascati, and died in Savona, Liguria. She was buried beside her husband in the Hautecombe Abbey, Saint-Pierre-de-Curtille. The couple had no children.

== Ancestry ==
Ancestors of Maria Cristina of Naples and Sicily

8. Philip V of Spain
4. Charles III of Spain
9. Elisabeth Farnese
2. Ferdinand I of the Two Sicilies
10. Augustus III of Poland
5. Maria Amalia of Saxony
11. Maria Josepha of Austria
1. Maria Cristina of Naples and Sicily
12. Leopold, Duke of Lorraine
6. Francis I, Holy Roman Emperor
13. Élisabeth Charlotte of Orléans
3. Maria Carolina of Austria
14. Charles VI, Holy Roman Emperor
7. Maria Theresa, Queen of Austria
15. Elisabeth Christine of Brunswick

Maria Cristina of Naples and Sicily House of Bourbon-Two Sicilies Cadet branch of the House of Bourbon Born: 17 January 1779 Died: 11 March 1849
Royal titles
| Preceded by Maria Theresa of Austria-Este | Queen consort of Sardinia; 12 March 1821 – 27 April 1831 | Succeeded by Maria Theresa of Austria |
