= Sabbadini =

Sabbadini is a surname. Notable people with the surname include:

- Linda Laura Sabbadini (born 1956), Italian statistician
- Marino Sabbadini (born 1969), Belgian footballer
- Remigio Sabbadini (1850–1934), Italian classical philologist
- Tino Sabbadini (1928–2002), French road bicycle racer

== See also ==
- Sabadini
- Sabbatini
