= Sabatini =

Sabatini may refer to:

== People ==
- Sabatini (surname)

== Places ==
- Sabatini Gardens in Madrid, Spain
- Sabatini, Italy, a volcanic region in Italy

== See also ==
- Sabadini
- Sabbatini, a family name of Italian origin
