= Sant'Antonio Abate, Chieri =

Roman Catholic church in Chieri, Italy

Coordinates: 45°0′50″N 7°49′24″E

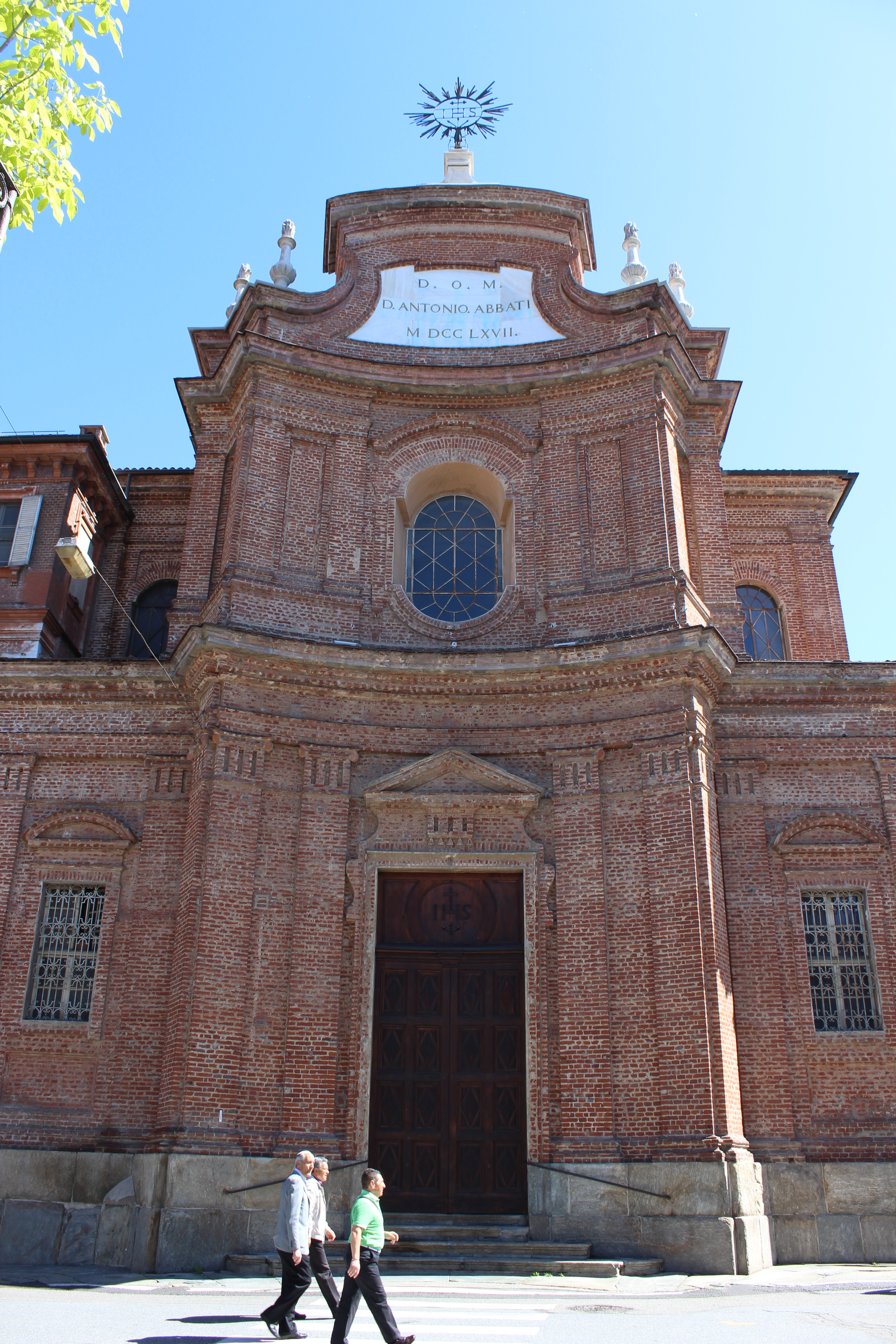
The facade of the church

Sant’Antonio Abate is a Baroque-style, Roman Catholic church and convent located at Piazza Cavour in the town of Chieri, Province of Turin, region of Piedmont, Italy.

== History ==
The church was reconstructed by the Jesuit order in the 17th century using designs by Filippo Juvarra, and refurbished by the architect Giuseppe Giacinto Bays in 1767. The Via Crucis panels were sculpted by Giovanni Battista Bernero. The adjacent convent is occupied by both Jesuits and commercial business.
