= Project for the Royal Palace in Campo de Ourique =

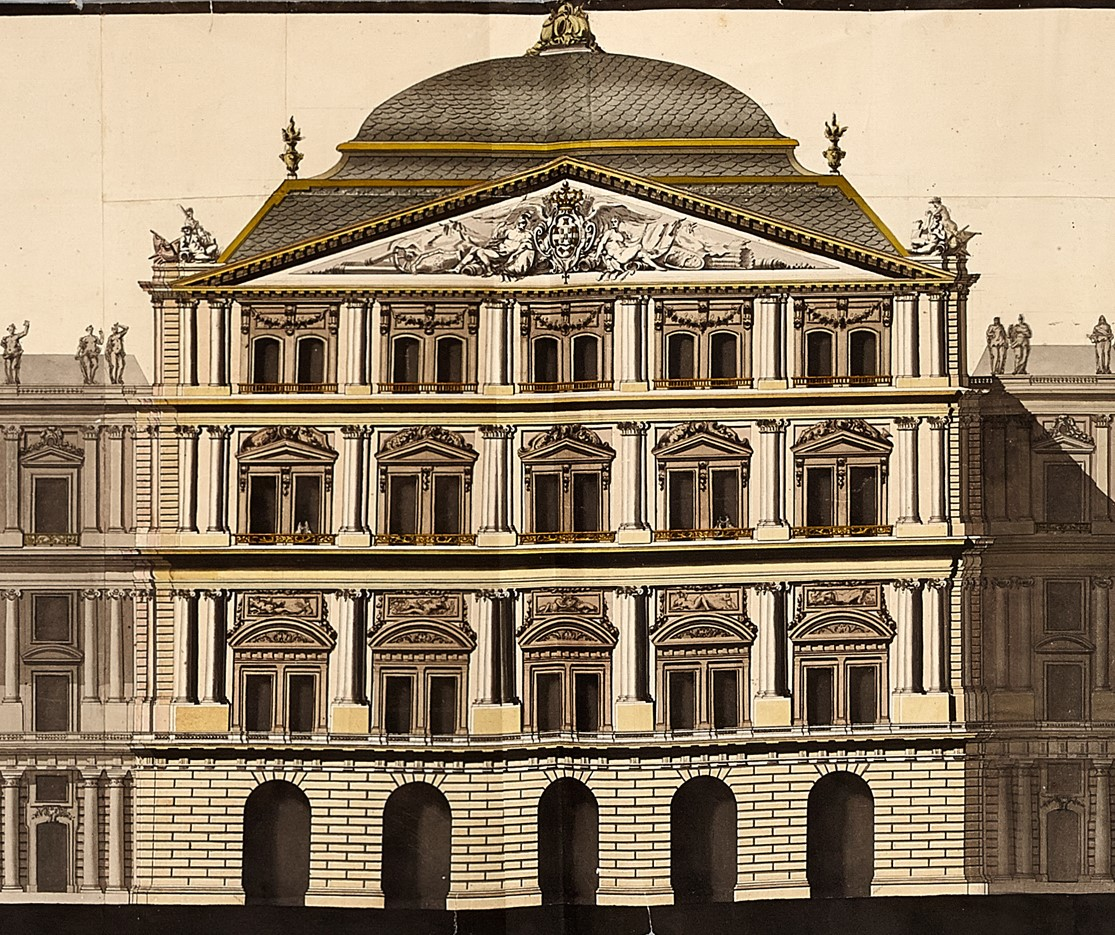
Detail of the central tower of one of the elevations of the royal palace.

The Project for the Royal Palace in Campo de Ourique was an ambitious 18th century proposal for a monumental royal palace to be built in the Campo de Ourique neighborhood of Lisbon. Portuguese architect Dionizio de S. Dionizio planned the palace for King Joseph I of Portugal as part of the reconstruction efforts following the destruction of the 1755 Lisbon Earthquake.

== Context ==
The 1755 Lisbon earthquake, with its ensuing tsunami and fire, devastated much of Lisbon, notably destroying the city's Ribeira Palace royal complex centered at the Terreiro do Paço, including the Tagus Royal Opera House and the new cathedral of the Patriarch of Lisbon. Ribeira Palace had been the primary Lisbon residence of the King of Portugal since the 16th century, when it substituted the Royal Alcáçova at São Jorge Castle. Following the earthquake, King Joseph I of Portugal and the Portuguese Royal Family established themselves in the western reaches of Lisbon, which survived the earthquake, first at Belém Palace and then at Ajuda Palace.

Reconstruction efforts for the city as a whole were charged to Manuel da Maia, Eugénio dos Santos, and Carlos Mardel by the Marquis of Pombal, King Joseph's prime minister. Manuel da Maia, as High-Engineer of the Kingdom, was charged with personally leading the efforts to rebuild a royal palace in central Lisbon.

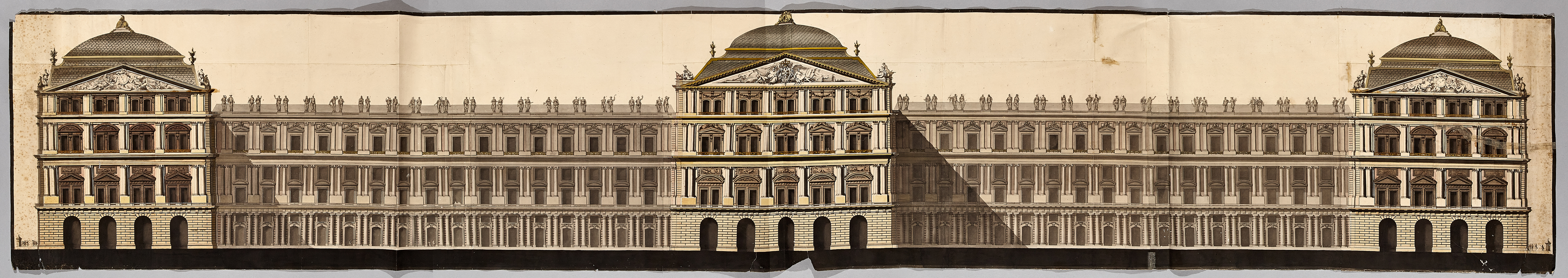

== History ==
In February 1756, Manuel da Maia selected Campo de Ourique to be the site of the new royal palace and began studies into the geography of the area and the urban planning of the palace and its integration into the larger urban environment. Campo de Ourique was purposefully chosen as an area not located near the Tagus river waterfront, which suffered the most destruction from the earthquake and tsunami. In 1758, Maia charged Carlos Mardel with the objective of contextualizing the chosen palace site into the larger urban fabric of the rebuilding city and Eugénio dos Santos with the execution of plans for the palace and its environs.

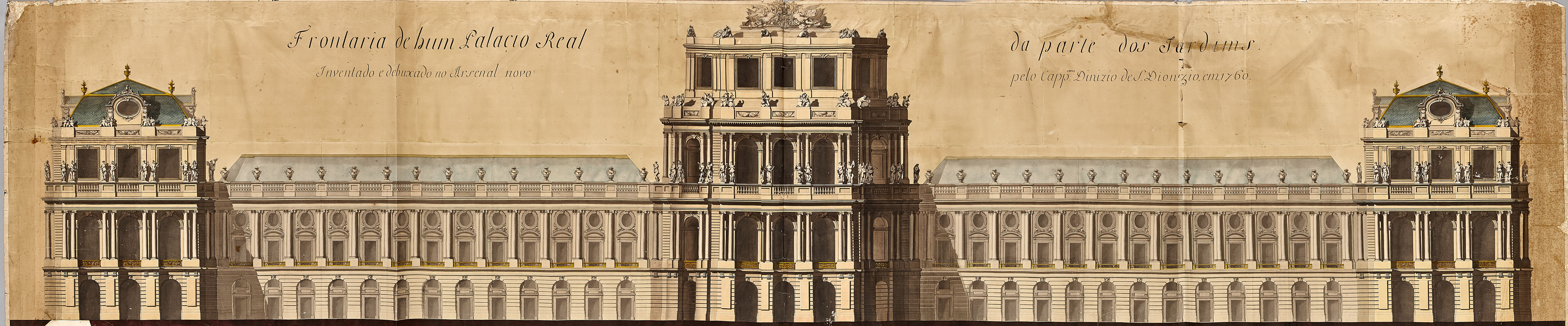

The two alternative elevations of possible main façades done by military engineer Captain Dionizio S. Dionizio in 1760 are thought to have been executed under the guidance of Eugénio dos Santos, though the details surrounding the palace's planning are unclear.

Owing to the primary concern of rebuilding the vast amounts of housing and commercial buildings destroyed by the earthquake, the Portuguese Royal Family eventually began to settle at Ajuda Palace, with many families of the Portuguese nobility choosing to establish themselves in the Belém district of Lisbon, which was spared from devastation. A sentiment arose among nobles who had rebuilt their own estates in the Belém and Ajuda districts that the King should not relocate and rebuilt a palace in Campo de Ourique, which was a considerable distance from Belém and Ajuda. This sentiment coupled with the complications that arose in the reconstruction of Lisbon, particularly of the scarcity of materials and labour, led to the decision to ultimately abandon the project for a palace in Campo de Ourique.

== Discovery ==
The façade elevations of the palace were discovered in 2014 by researchers at the Lisbon Academy of Sciences in the academy archives. Hélder Carita, a researcher with NOVA University Lisbon's FCSH, lead the investigation into the origin and context of the architectural plans. While it is assumed that Dionizio S. Dionizio executed these plans while under the leadership of Eugénio dos Santos, the prominence of his name on the plans, while also not being one of the prominent engineers and architects leading Lisbon's reconstruction, raise questions about the context in which these elevations were drawn up.

== See also ==
- Project of Filippo Juvarra for the Royal Palace of Lisbon
