= Project of Filippo Juvarra for the Royal Palace of Lisbon =

Unbuilt project by Filippo Juvarra

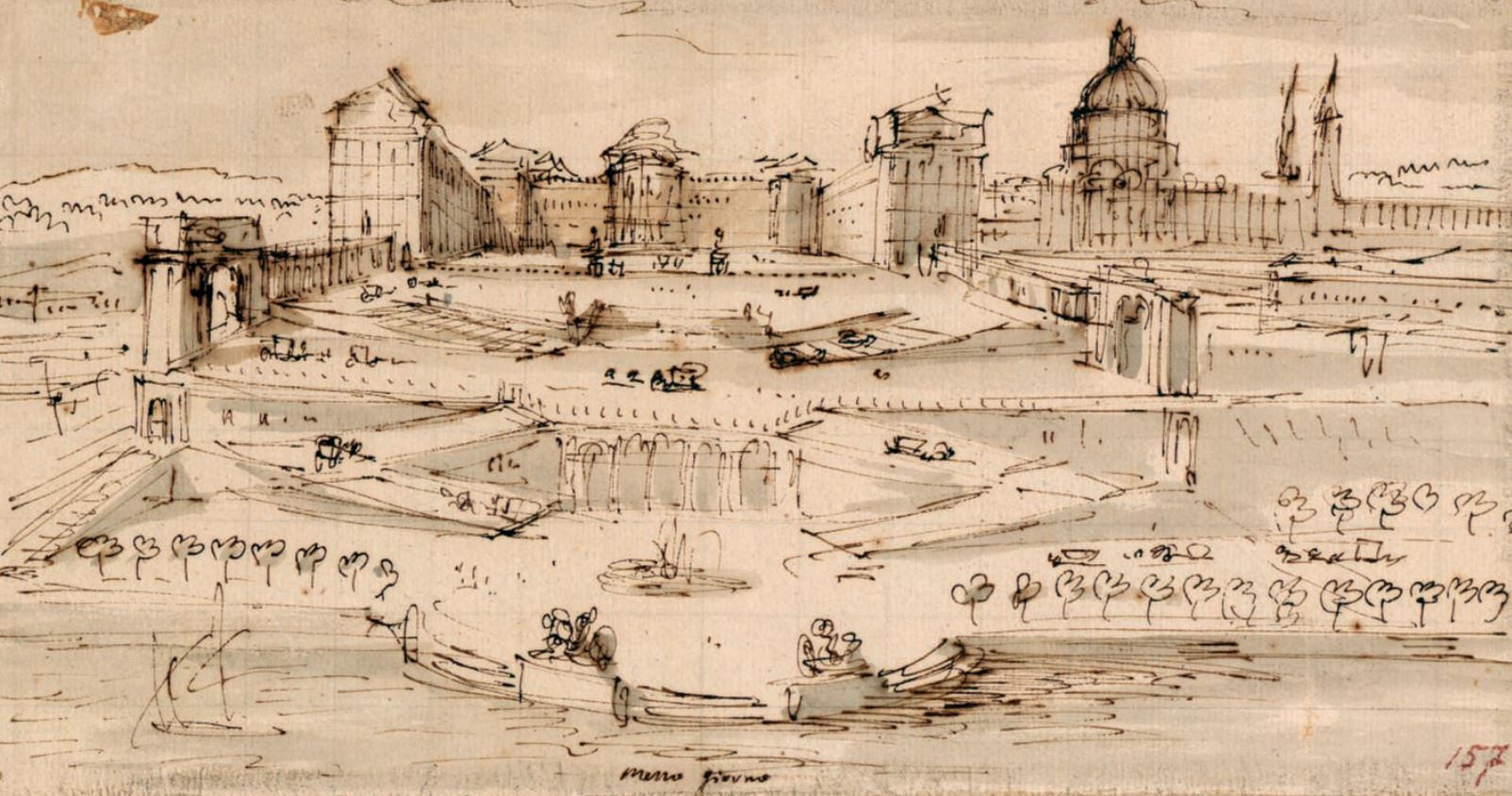
Draft of the palatial complex planned in Lisbon by Filippo Juvarra for King John V of Portugal.

The Project for the Royal Palace and Patriarchal Cathedral of Lisbon by Italian architect Filippo Juvarra was an ambitious proposal for a monumental complex located along the Tagus river in Lisbon, projected to house both a royal palace of King John V of Portugal and a new cathedral for the Patriarch of Lisbon. Juvarra planned the palace in 1719 for the modern-day Lapa neighborhood, though the works were never realized.

== History ==
At the beginning of the reign of King D. João V there were several deliberations on the possible construction of a sumptuous Royal Palace and a Patriarchal Cathedral, dedicated to Saint Mary of Portugal. The project was not only intended to create a symbol of the imperial power of the magnanimous monarch but also to celebrate the attribution of the position of Patriarch to the Archbishop of Lisbon Tomás de Almeida (1670–1754) by the Papal Bull «In supremo apostolatus solio» by Pope Clement XI (December 7, 1716). The place of construction would be either in a riverside area west of the Terreiro do Paço, called "Buenos Aires", or in the Terreiro do Paço itself. The initial studies were commissioned by an Italian architect named Filippo Juvarra, who arrived in Lisbon in January 1719 and worked on the schemes until July of that year. During his stay he also made schemes for the creation of a monumental lighthouse on the Tagus river mouth.

However, the choice of location by the architect (it would be in "Buenos Aires") and the size and architectural style of the building envisioned, inspired by Saint Peter's Basilica in the Vatican, led to the Secretary of State of the King, D. Diogo de Mendonça Corte-Real (1658–1736), to declare the project a show of megalomania. For this reason, D. João V decided to invest in a massive reconstruction of the Paços da Ribeira (Royal Ribeira Palace) in Terreiro do Paço, which did not survive the Lisbon Earthquake of 1755.

== See also ==
- Project for the Royal Palace in Campo de Ourique
- Project of Filippo Juvarra for the Royal Palace of Madrid
