= Sabadini =

Sabadini is an Italian surname. Notable people with the surname include:

- Bernardo Sabadini (died 1718), Italian opera composer
- Gaetano Sabadini (1703–1731), Italian Baroque painter
- Giuseppe Sabadini (born 1949), Italian footballer and manager
- Irene Sabadini, Italian mathematician

== See also ==
- Sabatini (disambiguation)
