= Giovanni Battista Sacchetti =

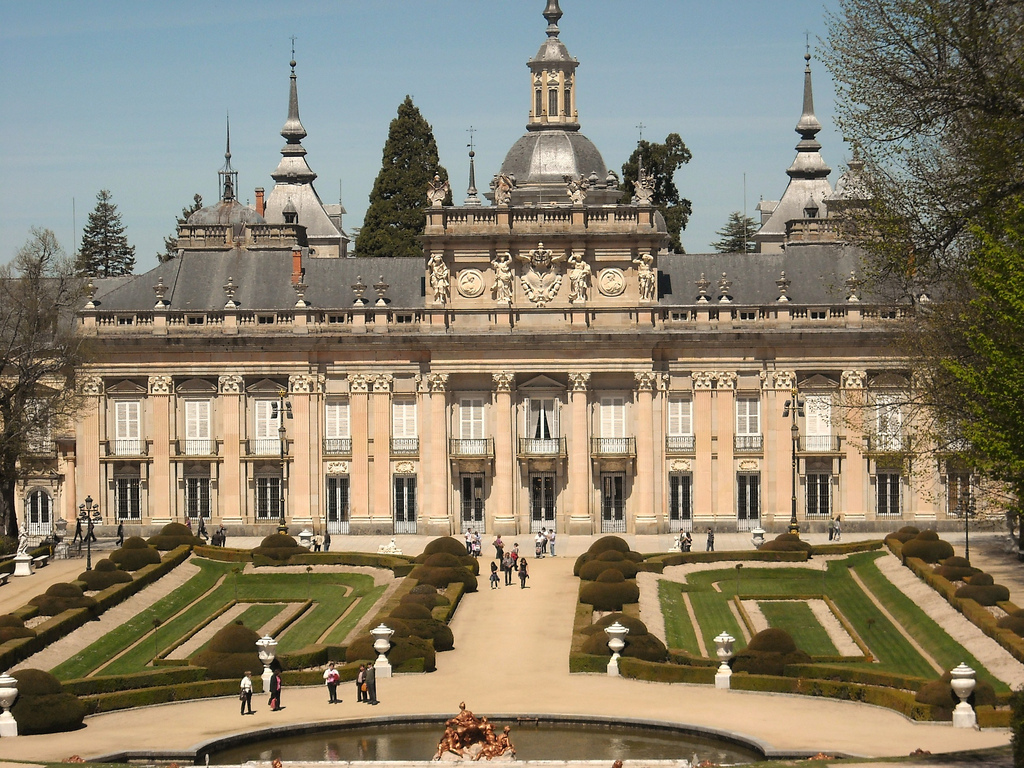
- Real Sitio de San Ildefonso
- Born: 17 March 1690; Turin, Duchy of Savoy
- Died: 7 February 1782 (aged 82); Madrid, Spain
- Occupation: Architect
- Movement: Baroque
- Practice: Filippo Juvarra

Giovanni Battista Sacchetti (or Saqueti), also known as Juan Bautista Sacchetti (17 March 1690 – 3 December 1764), was an Italian Baroque architect.

== Biography ==
Giovanni Battista Sacchetti was born in Turin on 17 March 1690. A student and protégé of Filippo Juvarra, Sacchetti assisted Gian Giacomo Planteri (1680–1756) on the Palazzo Saluzzo di Paesana in Turin. When Juvarra came to Madrid in 1735 to rebuild the Royal Palace, Sacchetti followed him to oversee the construction of the Real Sitio de San Ildefonso's façade, which was designed by Juvarra.

In 1738, two years after Juvarra's death, Philip V of Spain appointed Sacchetti as the King's architect, tasking him with overseeing the construction of the Royal Palace of Madrid. Departing from Juvarra's original plan, which featured four courtyards, Sacchetti reduced the palace's scale at the King's request, concentrating the structure around a single courtyard. The palace's foundation stone was laid in 1738. Between 1741 and 1742, Sacchetti submitted his design for the Royal Palace of Madrid to Roman architects from the Accademia di San Luca – specifically Ferdinando Fuga, Nicola Salvi and Luigi Vanvitelli – for expert review. Their opinion, received on 5 July 1742, approved the general plan while offering minor criticisms. Taking this feedback on board, Sacchetti divided the original staircase into two and constructed the Hall of Festivities (also known as the Hall of the Halberdiers) between them on the first floor.

Sacchetti served as Architect of the Royal Works from 1736 to 1760. In addition, he held the positions of Director of the Royal Academy of Fine Arts of San Fernando and Chief Master of Works for the City and Court of Madrid from 1742 until his death. He remodelled the Teatro del Príncipe (now the Teatro Español) and the Teatro de la Cruz. Other projects he worked on include the Almudena Cathedral, the Calle Bailén viaduct and the Convent of the Salesas Reales in Madrid, none of which he was able to complete. Sacchetti died in Madrid on 3 December 1764, aged 74.

== Bibliography ==
- Pucci, Giampiero (1936). "SACCHETTI, Giovan Battista". Enciclopedia Italiana. Rome: Istituto dell'Enciclopedia Italiana.
- Bottineau, Yves (1982). "L'art de cour dans l'Espagne de Philippe V 1700-1746 mise au point 1962-1982". Mélanges de la Casa de Velázquez. 18 (18–1): 477–493.
- Quezado Deckker, Zilah (2003). "Sacchetti [Saqueti], Giovanni Battista". Grove Art Online. Oxford University Press. doi:10.1093/gao/9781884446054.article.T074851.
