= Sabatini Gardens =

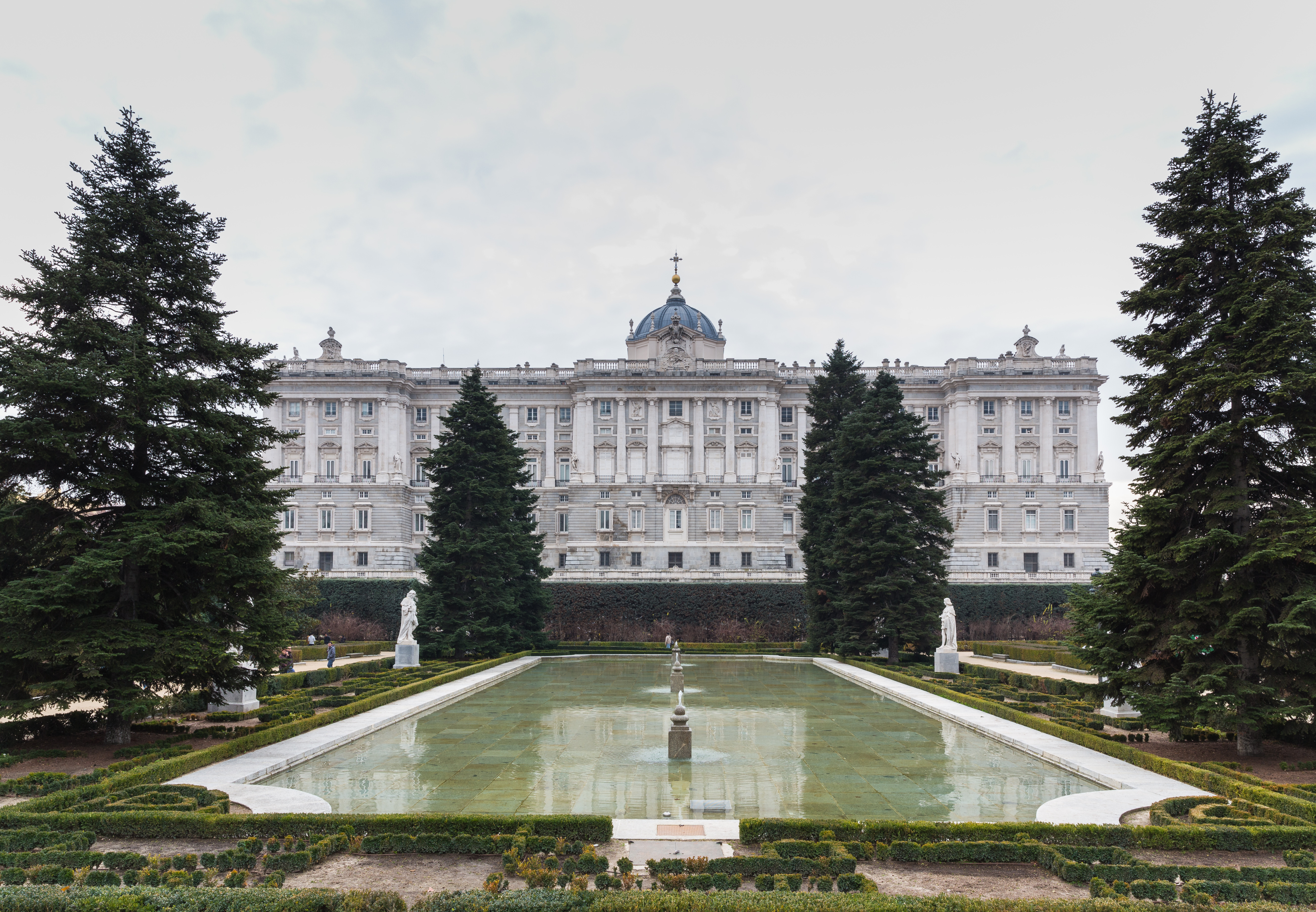
- Sabatini Gardens, with the Royal Palace.

- Location within Madrid Location within Spain
- Coordinates: 40°25′13″N 3°42′50″W

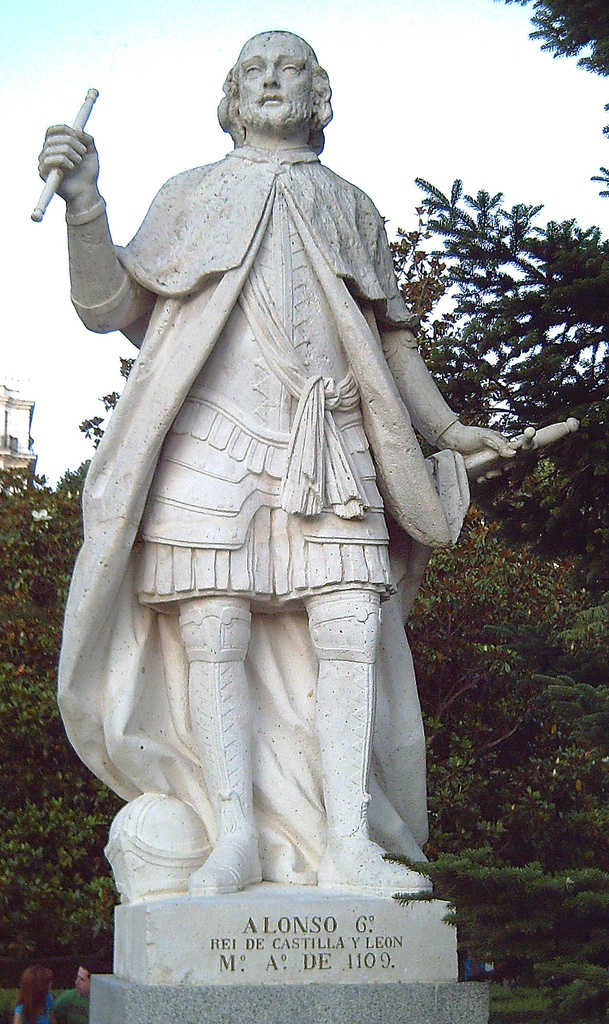
Statue of Alfonso VI of Castile at the Sabatini Gardens (F. Corral, 1753).

The Sabatini Gardens (in Spanish: Jardines de Sabatini) are part of the Royal Palace in Madrid, Spain, and were opened to the public by King Juan Carlos I in 1978. They honour the name of Francesco Sabatini (1722–1797), an 18th-century Italian architect who designed the royal stables of the palace, which used to be located at the site, as well as other works at the palace.

In 1933, the clearing of the stable buildings was begun, as well as the construction of the gardens, which were completed only in the late 1970s. The gardens have a formal Neoclassic style, consisting of well-sheared hedges and trees, in symmetric geometrical patterns, adorned with a pool, statues and fountains. The statues are of Spanish kings and were originally intended for the adjacent palace. The tranquil array is a peaceful corner from which to view the palace.

The gardens are divided into three terraces. The first one has a great symmetry in its design and at its center is a sheet of water like a mirror. The second terrace is located above the first one, where one can see the entire façade of the Royal Palace from which there is a pine grove to the Cuesta de San Vicente, a street that has an entrance with steps to the Sabatini Gardens. To the east of the second terrace is the third one.
