= Filippo Juvarra =

Italian architect (1678–1736)

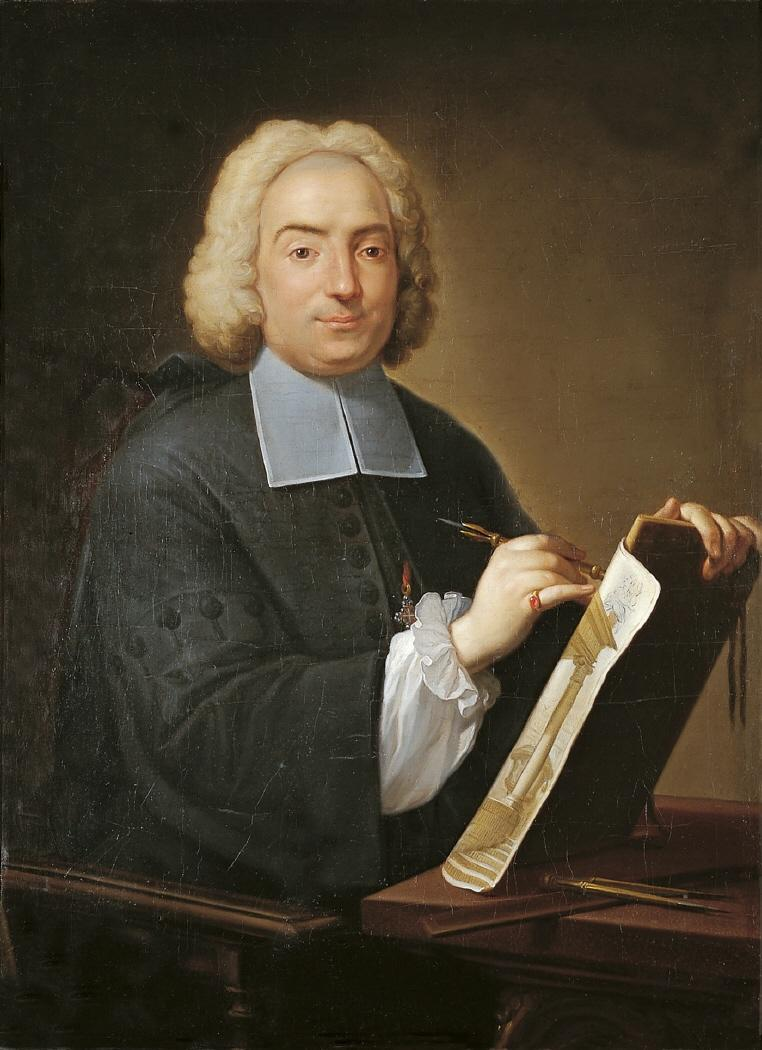
- Filippo Juvarra (c. 1707), by Agostino Masucci (Real Academia de Bellas Artes de San Fernando, Madrid)
- Born: 7 March 1678; Messina, Kingdom of Sicily
- Died: 31 January 1736 (aged 57); Madrid, Spain
- Occupation: Architect
- Buildings: List: Basilica of Superga; Santa Cristina (façade); Palazzo Madama (façade); Palace of Venaria (with Amedeo di Castellamonte, Michelangelo Garove and Benedetto Alfieri); Castle of Rivoli (with Ascanio Vitozzi, Michelangelo Garove, Carlo di Castellamonte and Amedeo di Castellamonte); Castle of Racconigi (with Guarino Guarini, Pelagio Palagi and Giovanni Battista Borra); Palazzina di caccia of Stupinigi; Royal Palace of La Granja de San Ildefonso
- Projects: Royal Palace of Madrid; Royal Palace of Lisbon

Filippo Juvarra or Juvara (7 March 1678 – 31 January 1736) was an Italian architect, scenographer, engraver and goldsmith. He was active in a late-Baroque architecture style, working primarily in Italy, Spain, and Portugal.

== Biography ==
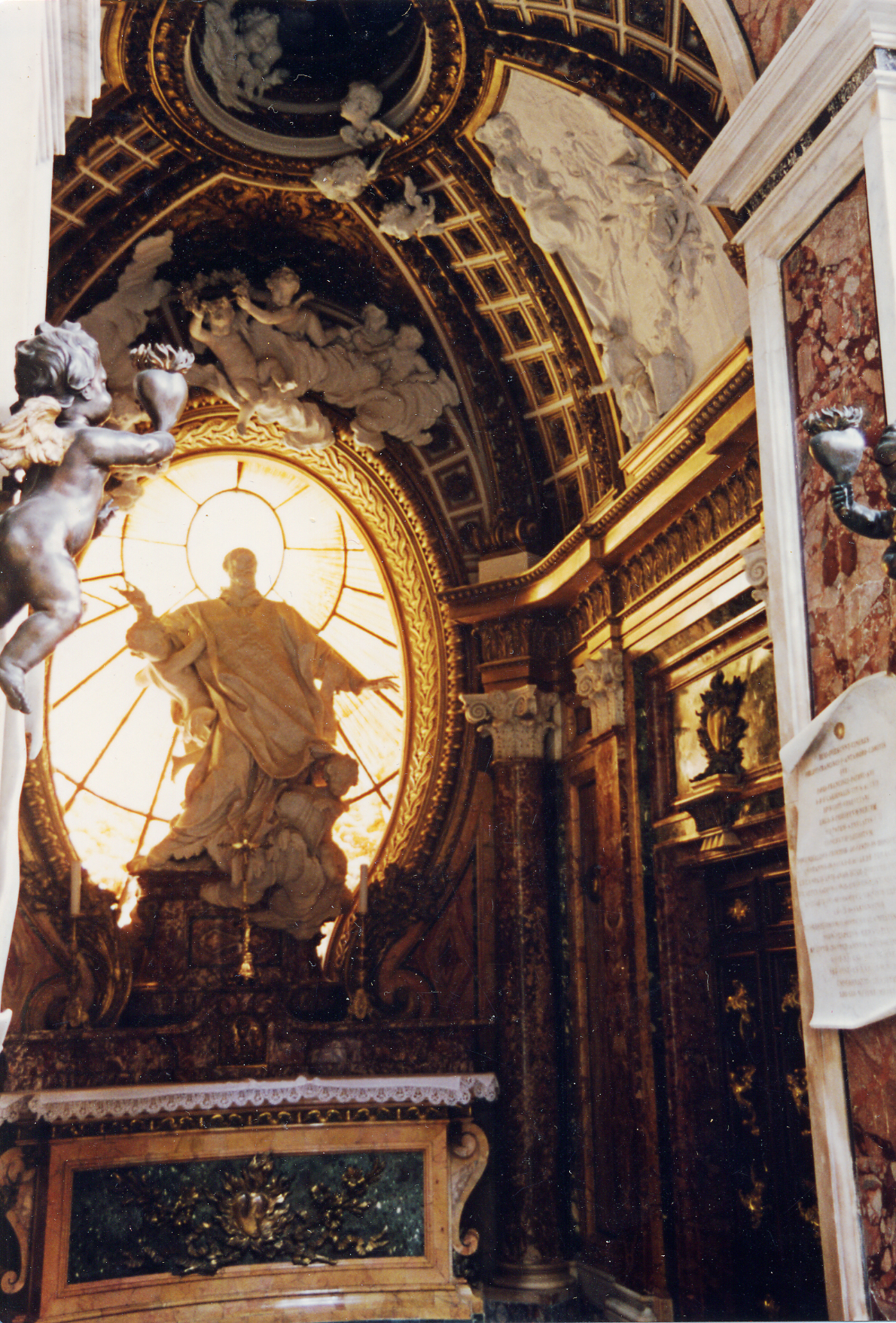
The Cappella Antamori in San Girolamo della Carità, by Juvarra and Le Gros

Juvarra was born in Messina, Sicily, to a family of goldsmiths and engravers. He spent his formative years with his family in Sicily, working in the family shop, but also studied for the priesthood, to which he was ordained in 1703. At the same time, he made his mark as a draughtsman - designing Messina's festive settings for the coronation of Philip V of Spain and Sicily (1701) - and studied architecture independently, working from books alone, such as those by Vitruvius and Vignola. Juvarra moved to Rome in 1704. There he studied architecture with Carlo and Francesco Fontana.

The first phase of his independent career was occupied with designs for ceremonies and celebrations, and especially with set designs for theatres. Juvarra's set designs incorporate the scena per angolo, literally 'scenes at an angle.' The exact origin of this style is unclear. Ferdinando Galli Bibiena claims to have invented it in his treatise Architettura Civile (1711). However, the style was clearly in use before then, including in the works of Juvarra. This style differed from the one-point perspective sets that had been developed in the sixteenth century and had reached their apogee in the seventeenth century; see, for example, the work of Giacomo Torelli. A couple of early drawings by Juvarra, dated 1706, are associated with the San Bartolomeo Theater in Naples, though whether he actually completed the set designs for the theatre is unknown. The majority of his work in theatre and set design was in Rome under the patronage of Cardinal Ottoboni. He assisted in the rebuilding of the Cardinal's private theatre in the Palazzo della Cancelleria and also designed sets for operas performed within the theatre. The first opera for which Juvarra designed all the sets was Costantino Pio, with libretto by Cardinal Ottoboni and music by CF Pollarolli. The opera premiered in 1709, inaugurated Ottoboni's newly renovated private theatre, and was one of the first operas to appear after the lifting of papal bans on secular theatre. He also worked on set designs for performances sponsored by Ottoboni at the Teatro Capranica. His other main patron in Rome was Marie Casimire d'Arquien, the widowed former Queen of Poland, for whom Juvarra produced set designs for the operas performed in her small domestic theatre in the Palazzo Zuccari. In 1713 a theatre project took him to Genoa.

In 1706 Juvarra won a contest for the new sacristy at the St. Peter's, organized by Pope Clement XI, and became a member of the prestigious Accademia di San Luca. In 1708 he created his first important non-theatrical architectural work, and the only one realized in Rome: the small but superbly executed Antamoro Chapel in the church of San Girolamo della Carità which he conceived in intimate cooperation with his close friend, the French sculptor Pierre Le Gros, who created the chapel sculptures.

Juvarra was also an engraver: his book of engravings of sculpted coats-of-arms appeared in 1711, Raccolta di varie targhe fatte da professori primarii di Roma.

After some time in Rome, Juvarra spent some time in his native Messina where he developed ambitious plans (never completed) for building along the harborside with a massive curved palace facade for residences and businesses. He was engaged in some projects in Lombardy, including a monumental altar for the Sanctuary Church of Caravaggio (never built, and substituted by a smaller work by architect Carlo Giuseppe Merlo), and the altar for the Bergamo Cathedral. He also designed the decorative belltower (now leaning) for the cathedral of Belluno.

== Churches in Turin ==
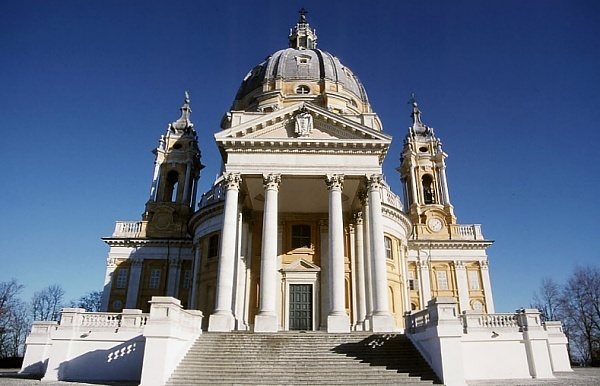
Basilica of Superga

In 1714, Juvarra began to design the architectural works for which he is best known, when he was recruited to the Duchy of Savoy, where Victor Amadeus II first employed him in a scenographic project, then elevated Juvarra to the position of chief court architect in Turin.

In Turin, Juvarra designed the facade of the church of Santa Cristina (1715–1718), the church of San Filippo, the church of Santa Croce, the Basilica della Natività, and the chapel of San Giuseppe (1725) in the church of Santa Teresa. He also designed and built the church of the Blessed Virgin of the Carmine (1732-1736), where the space is concentrated around the central hall with the scenographic effect of light falling from above. He also helped decorate the interior of many churches in Turin.

One of Juvarra's masterworks, the Basilica of Superga, was built in 1731 and rises at the top of a mountain overlooking the city of Turin. It was part-picturesque monument and part-royal mausoleum for the House of Savoy. Reputedly, the site was chosen because of a vow taken here by the then duke, and future king, Victor Amadeus II of Savoy, as he surveyed the field of operations while defending the city from the besieging French armies during the Battle of Turin. Construction was arduous, and took over fourteen years, including two years to flatten the mountaintop; and at incredible cost and effort to bring the stones and supplies to the peak. Behind the church, a monastery was erected. The classical portico is appended to a centralized church with a highly vertical, seventy-five metre, baroque dome; the latter creates a mountain atop a mountain effect.

He also built other churches, including the bizarre, Borrominesque church of San Gregorio in Messina, Sicily. In Mantua, he added a tall buttressed dome to the Alberti church of Sant'Andrea.

== Palaces in Portugal ==
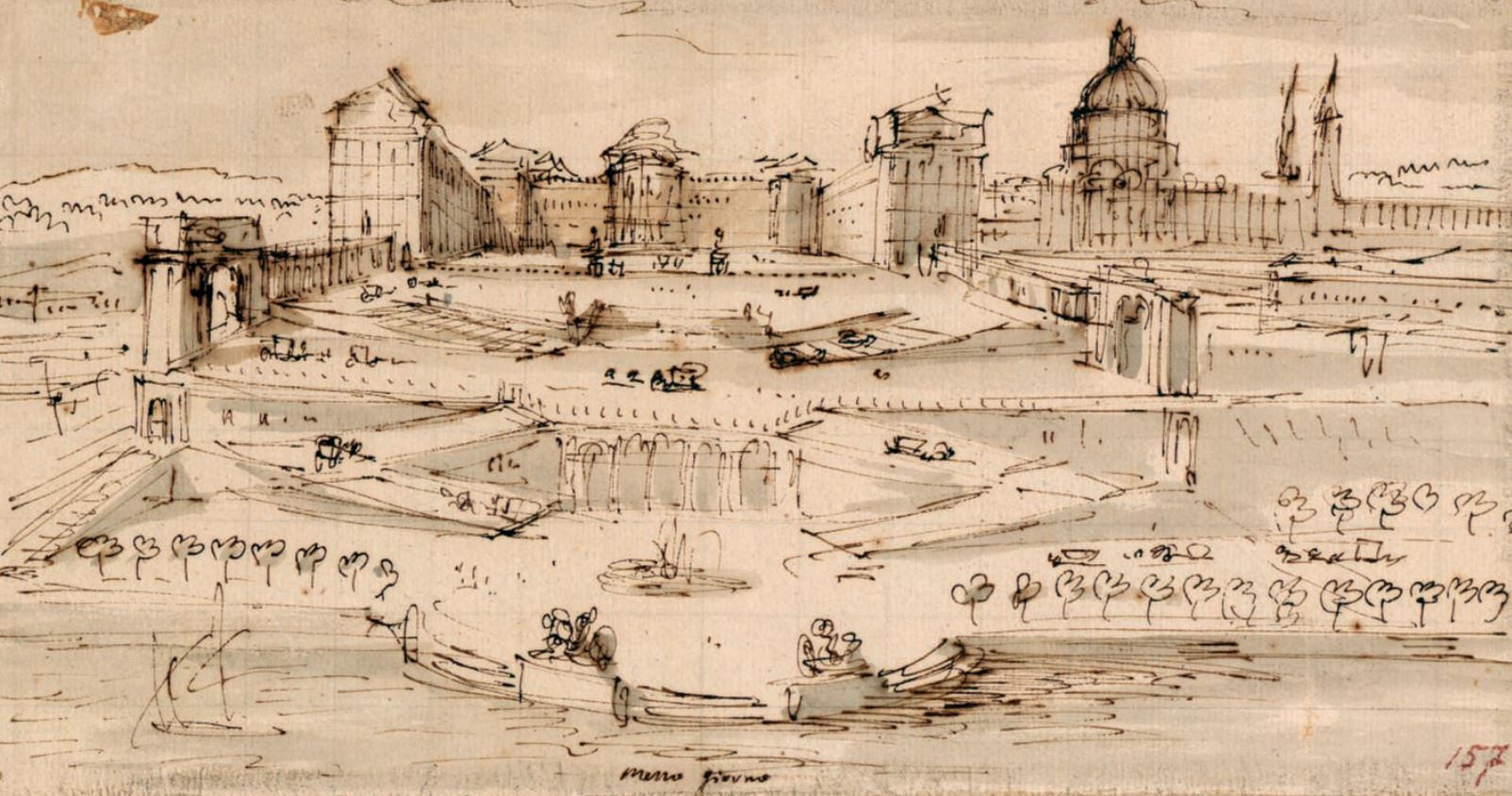
Project of Filippo Juvarra for the Royal Palace of Lisbon

The fame obtained in Piedmont led to demand for his talent and capacities at some of the richest noble and royal courts of Europe: in 1719 he was in Portugal, planning the palace at Mafra for King John V (1719–20), after which he travelled to London and Paris.

The project of Filippo Juvarra for the Royal Palace of Lisbon was planned starting in 1719, as an ambitious palatial complex alongside the Tagus river in Lisbon. The project included not only a monumental royal palace for King John V and the Portuguese royal court, but also a new cathedral for the Patriarch of Lisbon.

During his stay in Portugal he also made schemes for the creation of a monumental lighthouse in Lisbon at the mouth of the Tagus river with the Atlantic Ocean.

== Palaces in Northern Italy ==
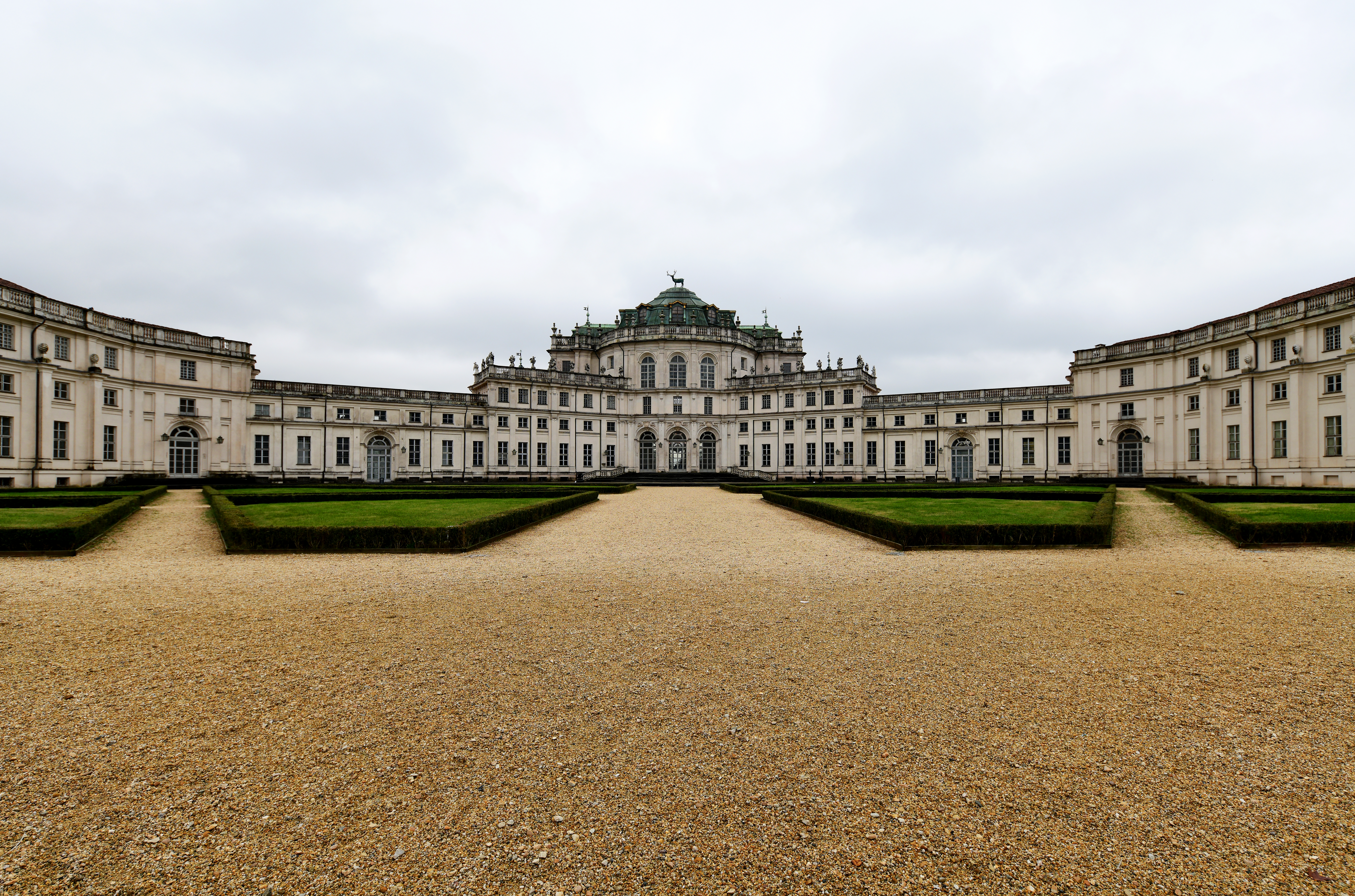
Palace of Stupinigi.

The Palace of Stupinigi (1729–1731) was built to be the royal hunting lodge some 6 miles outside of Turin, the huge layout and highly decorated interiors made this palace a grand setting for summer retreats. The massive oval central pavilion, topped by a bronze stag, fronted with large arched windows, and extending into angled wings, is the mixture of classicism and whimsy that describes the ornamented delights of Italian Rococo. Juvarra fulfilled the needs of his patron for classical grandeur, but with the baroque urge to decorate, to construct buildings as if they were made with curling ribbons. The pavilion interior, highly decorated with stucco and gilded details, fulfils the expectations further. Juvarra also received a commission to restore and refurbish the massive palace complex of the Savoy monarchy at Venaria Reale, called the Reggia di Venaria Reale, and its church of Sant'Uberto. The latter, in its unfinished state, sports eclectic influences, with an octagonal dome and embracing wings arching outward.

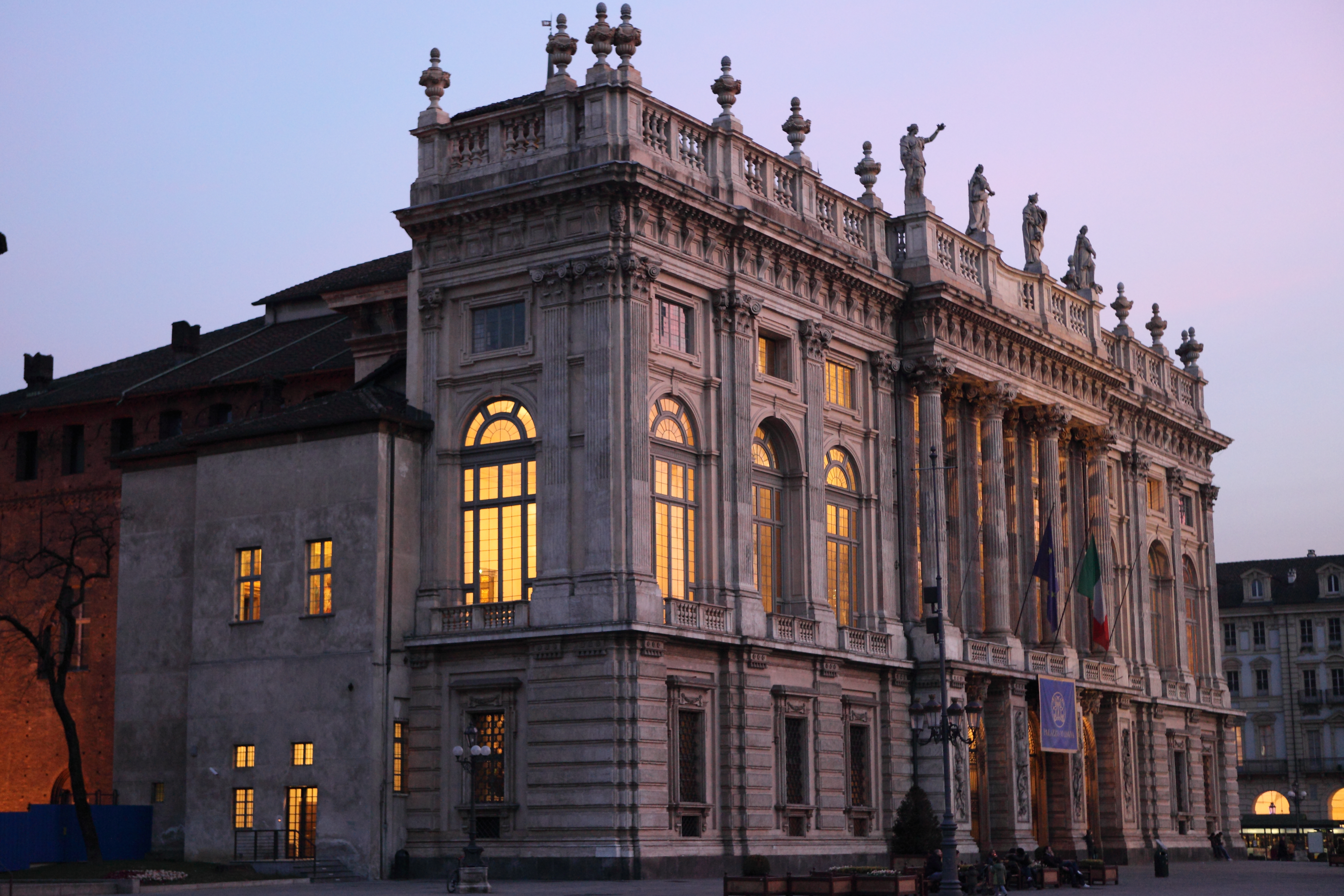
Palazzo Madama

One of his masterworks in palace construction is the façade (1718–21) of the Palazzo Madama, Turin. It recalls the formality of Palladio's Palazzo Chiericati but with the enhancement of detail and windows. While the facade appears to house an airy piano nobile, it in fact is merely a scenic, almost theatrical gesture, sheltering a grandiose entry stairway entrance to a medieval castle. But this work was also part of an ambitious program to recast the crowded, medieval layout of central Turin into a more open and planned set of connected plazas. He also designed the Royal Gate of the Sanctuary of Oropa, near Biella.

Juvarra also built the third enlargement of Turin to the west according to the orthogonal system introduced by Ascanio Vitozzi and Carlo di Castellamonte: the project included construction of Palazzo Martini di Cigala (1716) and of the Quartieri Militari (1716–1728). He helped design the Court of Appeals in Turin, a work completed by his successor, Benedetto Alfieri. He also helped design a palace in Milan. He created designs (never completed) for updating the Castle of Rivoli. The Neapolitan Corrado Giaquinto was among the artists that Juvarra invited to help decorate palaces, such as the Villa della Regina in Turin.

== Palaces in Madrid ==
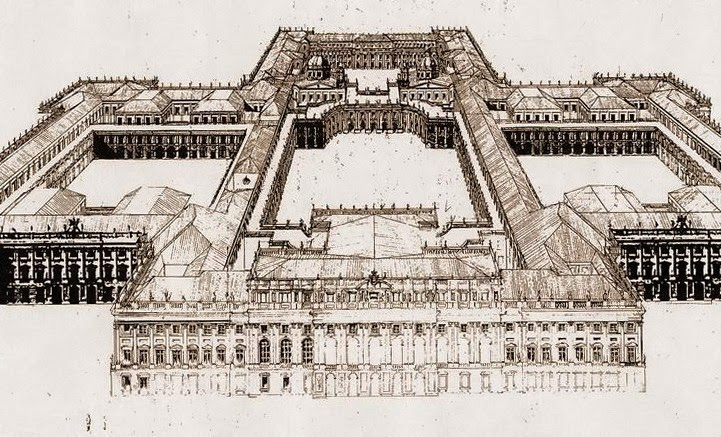
Project of Filippo Juvarra for the Royal Palace of Madrid

On Christmas Eve in 1734, the ancient Royal Alcazar of Madrid was destroyed by fire. This prompted the Bourbon king of Spain, Philip V to request Juvarra to supervise the construction of a new Palace. By April 1735 the architect had moved to Madrid, and began planning for the construction. The plans we have would have created an even larger structure than the present one with ample gardens. The linear facade has a formal rigidity lacking in some of his other works. He additionally executed designs for the façade of the Royal Palace of La Granja de San Ildefonso and for some portions of Royal Palace of Aranjuez. Juvarra however died suddenly by January 1736, less than nine months after arriving in Spain. While a wooden mockup was built of his plans for the Royal Palace, all his designs there were executed after his death by his pupils, including Giovanni Battista Sacchetti.

== Influence ==
Some writers noting that Juvarra's early training was in Rome, attribute his style to the instruction of Carlo Fontana, but Juvarra was eclectic in production and seems to have imbibed many other influences, including the more adventurous architecture of Pietro da Cortona and Francesco Borromini. He was also likely influenced by the works of Guarino Guarini. Baroque architects strongly influenced by Juvarra include Bernardo Vittone and Benedetto Alfieri. Juvarra and Johann Bernhard Fischer von Erlach influenced one another through the medium of engravings. Juvarra's work, along with much of Baroque art and architecture, fell out of favour with the rise of Neoclassicism. In 1994, a major exhibition of his designs was held in Genoa and Madrid.

== See also ==
- Project of Filippo Juvarra for the Royal Palace of Lisbon
- Project of Filippo Juvarra for the Royal Palace of Madrid
- Sant'Antonio Abate, Chieri

== Bibliography ==
- Borbonese, Emilio (1898). Guida di Torino. Turin: Roux Frassati. p. 354.
- Raggi, Giuseppina (2019). "The Lost Opportunity: Two Projects of Filippo Juvarra Concerning Royal Theaters and the Marriage Policy between the Courts of Turin and Lisbon (1719–1722)". Music in Art: International Journal for Music Iconography. 44 (1–2): 119–137. ISSN 1522-7464.
- Sturgis, Russell (1905). A dictionary of architecture and building: biographical, historical, and descriptive. Vol. 2. New York: Macmillan Company. p. 400.
- Pommer, R. (1967). Eighteenth-century Architecture in Piedmont: The Open Structures of Juvarra, Alfieri & Vittone. New York: New York University Press.
- Gritella, Gianfranco (1992). Juvarra: L'architettura. Modena: Panini.
- Viale Ferraro, Mercedes (1970). Filippo Juvarra: Scenografo e architetto teatrale. Turin: Fratelli Pozzo.

== Gallery ==
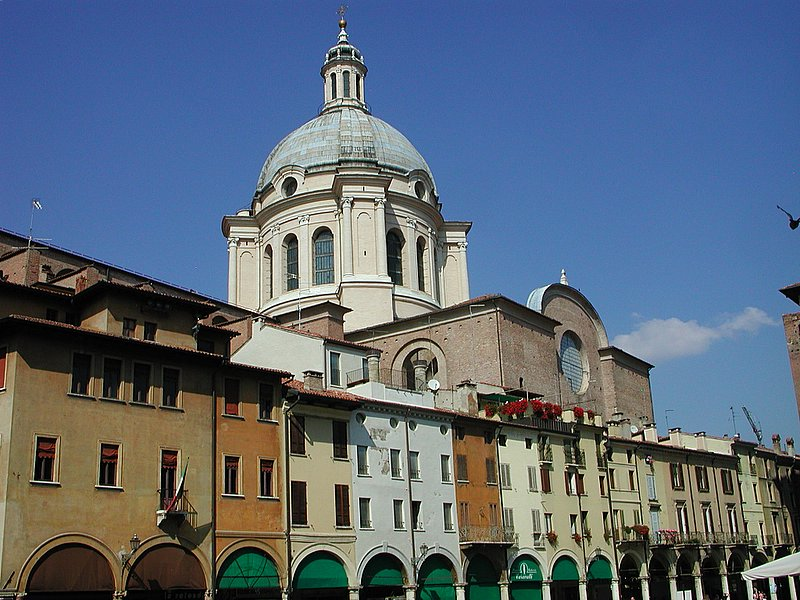
Cupola of the church of Sant'Andrea in Mantua

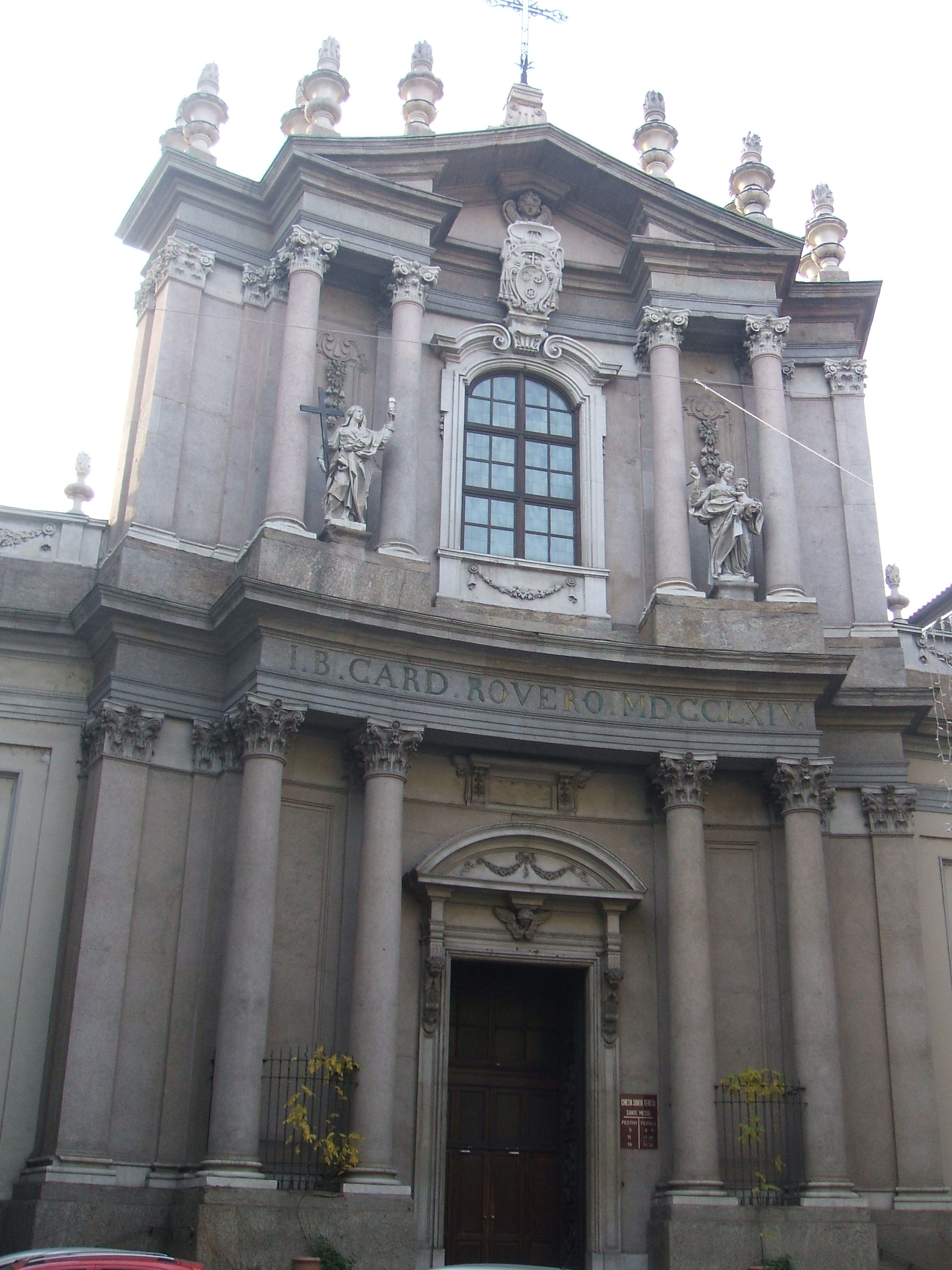
Santa Teresa in Turin

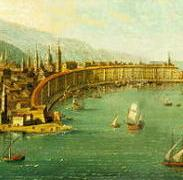
Painting of plans for harborside Messina

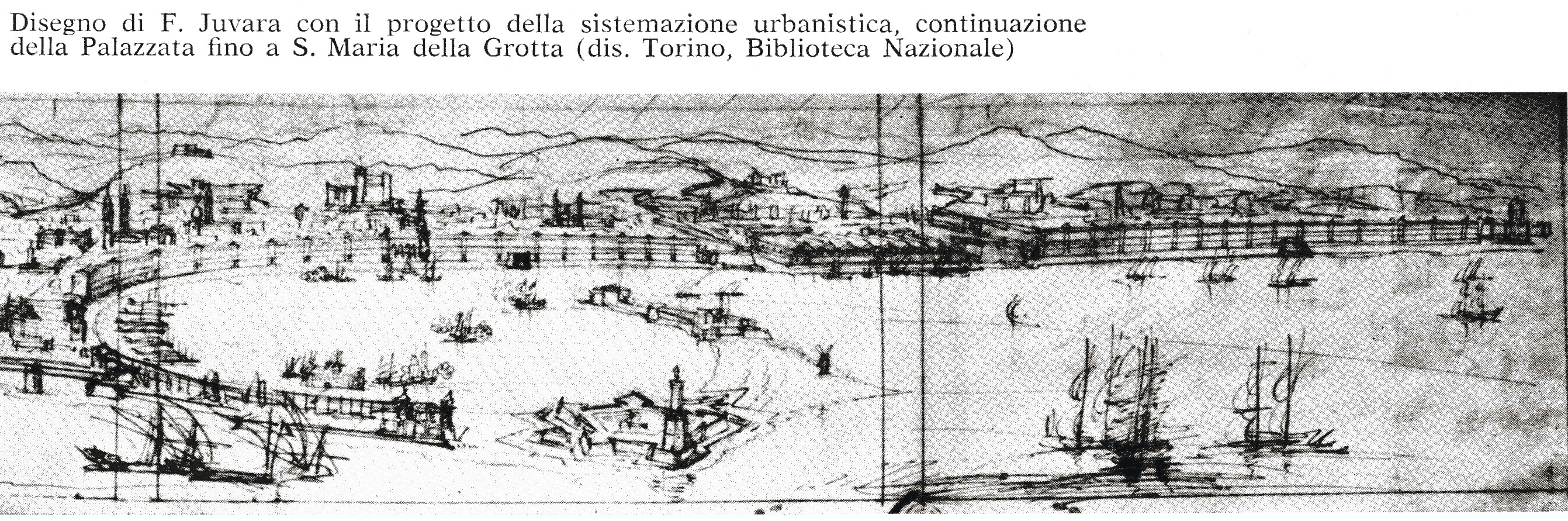
Sketch of harborside plans of Messina
