= Linda Laura Sabbadini =

Italian social statistician (born 1956)

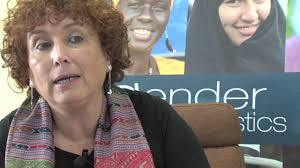
- Sabbadini in 2018
- Born: 5 May 1956 (age 70); Rome, Italy
- Occupation: Social statistician
- Years active: 1983–present
- Honours: Commander of the Order of Merit of the Italian Republic

Linda Laura Sabbadini (born 5 May 1956), is an Italian statistician who is recognized for her pioneering work on gender studies and central director of the Italian National Institute of Statistics.

== Early life ==
Sabbadini was born 5 May 1956 in Rome, Italy.

== Career ==
Sabbadini has been working at ISTAT since 1983 and has been a manager since 2000. She has dealt in particular with women, well-being, poverty, discrimination, migrants, the environment, fair sustainability, and volunteering.

She contributed to the ISTAT study published in 1985 which was a pioneer in the world in showing the value of women's work within the family and renewed the ISTAT studies in the area since 1990; in 1995 the World Conference on Women in Beijing declared the importance of such statistical studies on the study of women.

Subsequently, she "created relationships such as Fair and Sustainable Well-being to have an integrated vision between economy, society and environment in the evolution of the country".

=== Poverty and social exclusion ===
Under her direction, the set of inequality and poverty measures has been significantly expanded and enriched, allowing for in-depth analyses of the dynamics of social inequality in Italy.

From 2003 to 2009 she was a member of the Commission of Inquiry into Social Exclusion (CIES),^{[2]} established by the Ministry of Labour and Social Policies.

Between 2009 and 2010 she was a member of the Commission for the revision of the methodology for the estimation of absolute poverty established at ISTAT which proposed an innovative methodology also at an international level.

Under her direction, the methodological restructuring of the survey on consumption expenditure was conducted, which allowed for a significant improvement in the quality of poverty estimates, and the new methodology for estimating homelessness was developed, which also involved the associations most in contact with the homeless population.

=== Fair and sustainable well-being ===
She directed the design and implementation of the indicators of equitable and sustainable well-being for which Italy played a leading role on a global level.

Together with Maria Teresa Salvemini, she coordinated the CNEL-ISTAT Steering Committee for the definition of progress and well-being of Italian society, which brought together representatives of civil society. Together with the President of ISTAT, she coordinated the Scientific Commission for the measurement of Well-being.

She edited the Reports on Equitable and Sustainable Well-being until 2015 and produced scientific publications on well-being at a national and international level.

She was a member of the Friends of the Chair of the UN on broader measures of progress on sustainable development indicators, which included the Presidents of the National Institutes of Statistics, for the advanced role played by Italy on measures of well-being.

=== Gender differences ===
A pioneer of gender statistics, in 1995 she participated in the World Conference on Women in Beijing, editing the volume Tempi Diversi - translated into 4 languages and distributed during the same conference - focused on the organization of the life times of men and women in Italy which, for the first time, contains the measure of the amount of unpaid work.

The gender approach has always been combined with the measurement of quality of life, through the conduct of numerous surveys on all aspects of social life, collecting information on the behaviors, expectations and feelings of Italians.

Even before international recommendations existed, she directed the planning and implementation of the estimation of gender violence, including its hidden part. For this reason, she provided an important contribution within the UN group to define the guidelines for measuring violence against women at a global level.

Under her direction, measures of male fertility, sexual blackmail at work, the sacrifices and discriminations suffered by women, the difficulties encountered in the course of life, the forms of family life experimented with, the causes of the low birth rate were defined.

She has published numerous scientific articles and monographs concerning the different dimensions of social life, overcoming the 'gender blind' approach that had characterized official statistics until the 1980s.

She collaborated with the National Equality Commission, with the Ministers for Equal Opportunities, was part of the Inter-ministerial Commission for the support of victims of trafficking, violence and serious exploitation of the Inter-ministerial Commission against genital mutilation established at the Department for Rights and Equal Opportunities.

She was Coordinator of the Integrated Data System Group on Violence against Women within the Government Task Force on Violence against Women under the Letta Government.

She participated several times in the UN Commission on the Status of Women as a member of the government delegation for the statistical function.

She has been a member of UN high-level groups on gender statistics and in particular since 2007 she has been a member of the UN Interagency and expert group on gender statistics.

She participated in the G7 of women in 2017 Starting from girls. Women Forum on inequality and sustainable growth and edited the statistical part of the G7 2017 in Taormina. She was a columnist for the newspaper La Stampa in 2016, moving on to the newspaper la Repubblica on 27 April 2020.

== Awards and recognitions ==
- Amelia 2021
- 100 Italian Excellences (2015)
- International Women's Award (2015)
- Casato Prime Donne Award (2013)
- Woman's Voice Award (2013)
- Special Award for the Women and Future Project (2012)

== Honours ==
Commander of the Order of Merit of the Italian Republic

«On the initiative of the President of the Republic » — Rome , 23 February 2006.
