= Alberto Gallo =

Alberto Gallo may refer to:

- Alberto Enríquez Gallo (1894–1962), President of Ecuador, 1937–1938
- Alberto Gallo (footballer) (born 1975), Italian retired footballer
- Alberto Gallo (fund manager) (born 1983), Italian fund manager

== See also ==
- Albert Gallo (born 1930), New York mobster
