= Alberto Gallo (fund manager) =

- Born: 1983 (age 42–43); Naples, Italy
- Education: Bocconi University
- Occupations: Chief Investment Officer and Founder at Andromeda Capital Management
- Title: Guest faculty at SDA Bocconi School of Management
- Website: andromedainvestors.com

Alberto Gallo (born 1983) is Chief Investment Officer and Founder at Andromeda Capital Management.

== Education ==
In 1997, joined Scuola Navale Militare "F. Morosini" in Venice, where he become chief cadet of his class.
He graduated in Economics from Bocconi University cum laude at 21, two years ahead of the norm.

== Career ==
Gallo joined Merrill Lynch in 2004, in London, moving to Bear Stearns in 2007 to run global credit derivatives strategy. In the run-up to the crisis, Gallo's team warned investors about the imbalances building in the credit market.

In 2008 he joined Goldman Sachs in New York, as a strategist in the Global Investment Research division. In 2011 he joined RBS, becoming managing director and heading the global credit strategy team.

Alberto Gallo and his team were ranked top 3 for Investment Grade Strategy and High Yield Strategy in 2013, 2014, 2015 and 2016 by Institutional Investor.

After the 2008 financial crisis, Gallo became critical of the European Central Bank response to the euro area crisis, coining the term "QE infinity" to describe that the quantitative easing response would not be sufficient to restart growth and inflation, and would last for much longer than expected.

Over the following years, he continued to advocate a focus on reforms, shifting away from the one-size-fits-all approach of QE infinity.

In 2016, he joined Algebris as partner and portfolio manager, to launch and run the Macro Credit fund (later renamed as Global Credit Opportunities fund) designed to deal with negative interest rates and the QE infinity environment.

The Algebris Global Credit Opportunities fund was awarded by EuroHedge in 2019 as Best Macro-Fixed Income Ucits, and as the best Multi-Strategy Credit Fund by the AltCredit European Performance Award in 2020. The fund was ranked five stars by Morningstar in 2021. Gallo has been ranked by Citywire since 2020.

In April 2022 Gallo resigned from Algebris Investments, to launch his own firm, Andromeda Capital Management, together with Aditya Aney.

Gallo has been a participant to the ECB's Financial Stability Contact Group (FSCG) since 2015.

He has published articles in the Financial Times, The Wall Street Journal, the World Economic Forum, Bloomberg Opinion. He is a guest faculty at SDA Bocconi School of Management, and a CFA chartherholder.
