= 1994–95 Calcio Padova season =

Calcio Padova
1994–95 season
- Chairman: Sergio Giordani
- Manager: Mauro Sandreani
- Stadium: Stadio Euganeo
- Serie A: 14th
- Coppa Italia: Second Round
- Top goalscorer: Filippo Maniero (9)

During the 1994–95 Italian football season, Calcio Padova competed in the Serie A and their first season in the top flight since the 1961–62 season.

== Kit ==
Padova's kit was manufactured by Italian sports retailer Lotto and sponsored by Acqua Vera.

== Squad ==
=== Goalkeepers ===
- (Italy) Adriano Bonaiuti
- (Italy) Ennio Dal Bianco

=== Defenders ===
- (Italy) David Balleri
- (Italy) Andrea Cuicchi
- (Italy) Franco Gabrielli
- (United States) Alexi Lalas
- (Italy) Massimiliano Rosa
- (Italy) Cristian Servidei
- (Italy) Gianluca Zattarin

=== Midfielders ===
- (Italy) Gianni Cavezzi
- (Italy) Maurizio Coppola
- (Italy) Gaetano Fontana
- (Italy) Marco Franceschetti
- (Netherlands) Michel Kreek
- (Italy) Damiano Longhi
- (Italy) Carmine Nunziata
- (Italy) Emanuele Pellizzaro
- (Italy) Carlo Perrone
- (Italy) Davide Tentoni
- (Italy) Daniele Zoratto

=== Attackers ===
- (Italy) Giuseppe Galderisi
- (Italy) Alberto Gallo
- (Italy) Filippo Maniero
- (Italy) Roberto Putelli
- (Croatia) Goran Vlaovic

== Competitions ==
=== Serie A ===
==== League table ====
Pos	Team	Pld	W	D	L	GF	GA	GD	Pts	Qualification or relegation
12	Bari	34	12	8	14	40	43	−3	44	
13	Cremonese	34	11	8	15	35	38	−3	41	
14	Padova	34	12	4	18	37	58	−21	40 (Note: winner of relegation tie-breaker 1-1*(5:4) vs Genoa. (10 June 1995))	Relegation tie-breaker
15	Genoa (R)	34	10	10	14	34	49	−15	40 (Note: Loser of relegation tie-breaker 1-1*(4:5) vs Padova. (10 June 1995). Relegated to 1995-96 Serie B)	Serie B after tie-breaker
16	Foggia (R)	34	8	10	16	32	50	−18	34	Relegation to Serie B

Source: Serie A, RSSSF.com, Soccerway
Rules for classification: 1) Points; 2) Head-to-head points; 3) Head-to-head goal difference; 4) Goal difference; 5) Goals scored; 6) Draw. (Note: Head-to-head record is used only after all the matches between the teams in question have been played).
(R) Relegated

==== Matches ====
4 September 1994 1	Sampdoria	5–0	Padova
		Report

11 September 1994 2	Padova	0–3	Parma
		Report

18 September 1994 3	Torino	2–0	Padova
		Report

25 September 1994 4	Padova	0–2	Bari
		Report

2 October 1994 5	Napoli	3–3	Padova
		Report

15 October 1994 6	Padova	2–0	Milan
		Report

23 October 1994 7	Fiorentina	4–1	Padova
		Report

30 October 1994 8	Padova	0–0	Foggia
		Report

6 November 1994 9	Padova	2–0	Brescia
		Report

20 November 1994 10	Lazio	5–1	Padova
		Report

27 November 1994 11	Padova	1–2	Juventus
		Report

4 December 1994 12	Roma	2–0	Padova
		Report

11 December 1994 13	Padova	2–1	Cagliari
		Report

18 December 1994 14	Reggiana	3–0	Padova
		Report

8 January 1995 15	Padova	3–2	Cremonese
		Report

15 January 1995 16	Genoa	2–1	Padova
		Report

22 January 1995 17	Padova	1–0	Inter
		Report

29 January 1995 18	Padova	1–4	Sampdoria
		Report

12 February 1995 19	Parma	1–0	Padova
		Report

19 February 1995 20	Padova	4–2	Torino
		Report

26 February 1995 21	Bari	0–1	Padova
		Report

5 March 1995 22	Padova	2–0	Napoli
		Report

12 March 1995 23	Milan	1–0	Padova
		Report

19 March 1995 24	Padova	0–1	Fiorentina
		Report

2 April 1995 25	Foggia	4–1	Padova
		Report

9 April 1995 26	Brescia	1–3	Padova
		Report

14 April 1995 27	Padova	2–0	Lazio
		Report

23 April 1995 28	Juventus	0–1	Padova
		Report

30 April 1995 29	Padova	0–0	Roma
		Report

7 May 1995 30	Cagliari	2–0	Padova
		Report

14 May 1995 31	Padova	3–0	Reggiana
		Report

21 May 1995 32	Cremonese	3–0	Padova
		Report

28 May 1995 33	Padova	1–1	Genoa
		Report

4 June 1995 34	Inter	2–1	Padova
		Report
