= New SANAA Campus =

- Nouvo Campus SANAA (Italian)
- Click on the map for a fullscreen view

General information
- Location: Milan, Italy
- Coordinates: 45°26′51.16″N 9°11′13.88″E

Design and construction
- Architect(s): SANAA

The New SANAA Campus (Italian: Nuovo Campus SANAA) is a building complex on the Bocconi University campus in Milan, Italy.

== History ==
The complex, which constitutes an expansion of the Bocconi University campus, was designed by Japanese architectural firm SANAA. Inauguration took place on November 29, 2019, in the presence of the President of the Italian Republic, Sergio Mattarella.

== Description ==
The complex includes the new seat of the SDA Bocconi School of Management, a student dorm and a sports center equipped with an Olympic-size swimming pool.

The buildings are characterized by sinuous volumes and façades, ground-floor glass windows and interior courtyards, typical of Milanese architecture, that make them porous to the public. Sheltered porticoes link the several buildings, providing sheltered connection across the gardens that separate them.

== Gallery ==

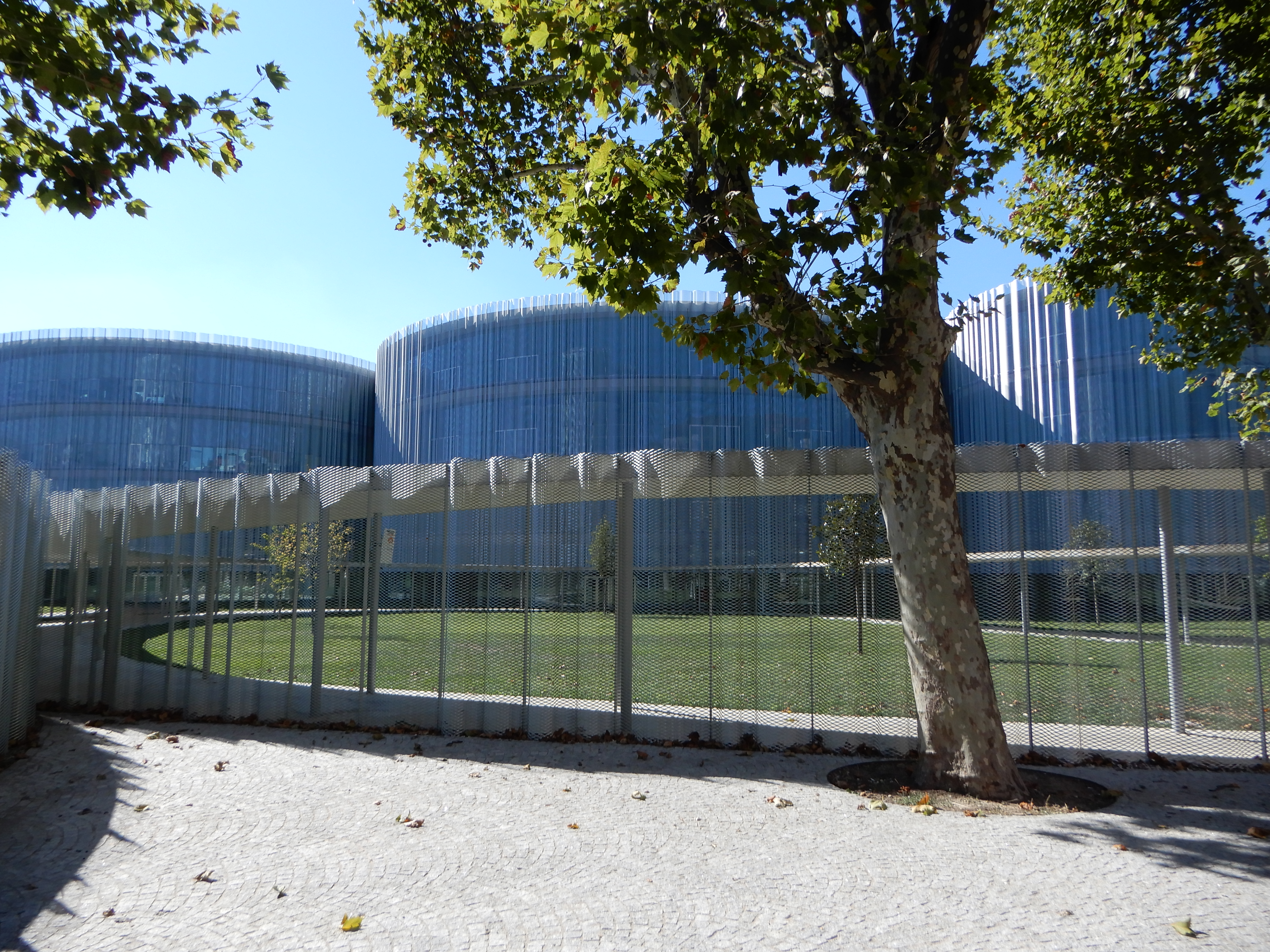

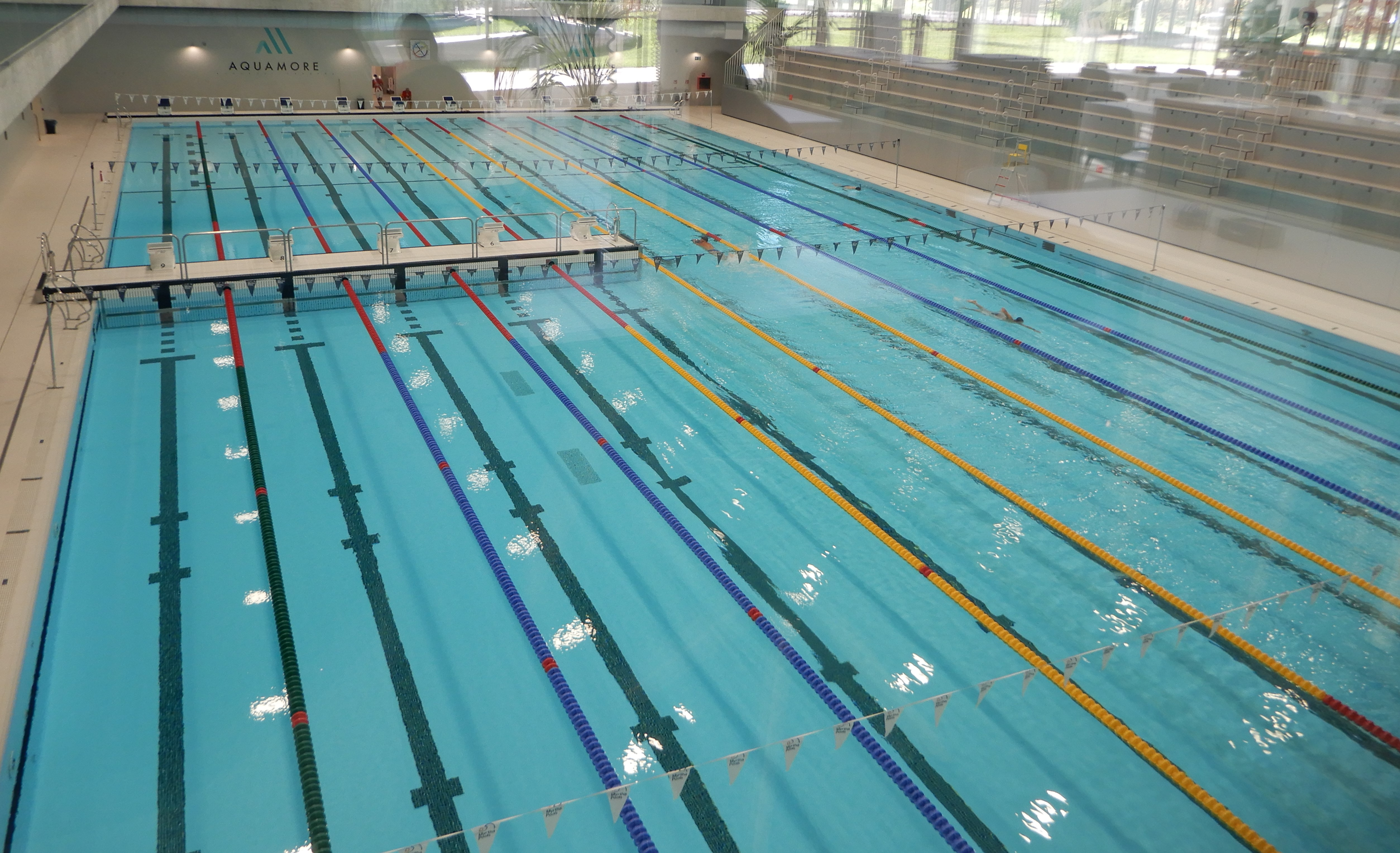

== See also ==
- Sarfatti Building
- Roentgen Building
