= Sabattini =

Sabattini is a surname. Notable people with the surname include:

- Amadeo Sabattini (1892–1960), Argentine politician
- Rory Sabbatini (born 1976), South African-born Slovak golfer
- Sandra Sabattini (1961–1984), Italian Roman Catholic

== See also ==
- Sabatini (surname)
