= Roentgen Building =

- Edificio Roentgen (Italian)
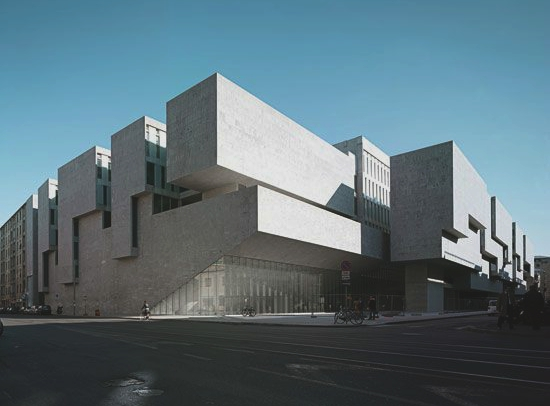
- Roentgen Building in Milan
- Click on the map for a fullscreen view

General information
- Location: Milan, Italy
- Coordinates: 45°27′02.7″N 9°11′16.4″E

Design and construction
- Architect: Grafton Architects

The Roentgen Building (Italian: Edificio Roentgen) is an office building on the Bocconi University campus in Milan, Italy.

== History ==
The building, ultimated in 2008, was designed by Shelley McNamara and Yvonne Farrell's Grafton Architects, winners of a contest purposefully organized in 2001, as a new office building for Bocconi University. The building received the World Building of the Year 2008 award.

== Description ==
The exterior of the building is monumental and fortress-like, being almost windowless.

== See also ==
- Sarfatti Building
- New SANAA Campus
