= Sabbatini =

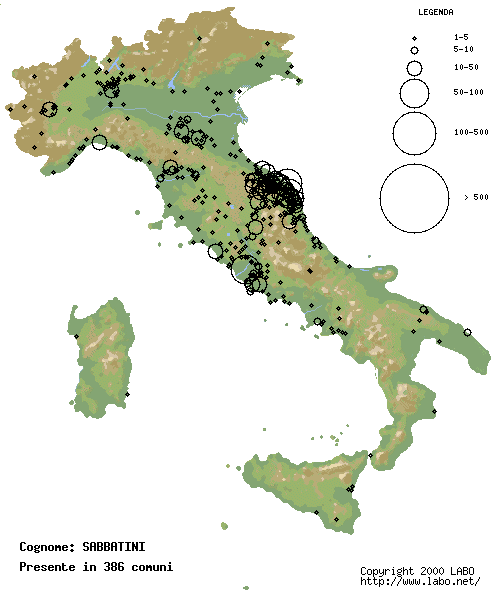
Distribution of the Sabbatini surname in Italy

Sabbatini, with its variations Sabbatino (plural form thereof), Sabbadin, Sabbadino and Sabbadini, is a family name of Italian origin. Other variants use one b only, such as Sabatini, Sabatino, Sabadin, Sabadini and Sabadino and are also very common names in Italy. Variations with a double t (particularly in foreign countries where Italians emigrated to), such as in Sabattini and Sabbattini, also exist. Still rarer variations are Sabbatello, Sabbatiello, Sabbatella, Sabbatinella, Sabbatucci and Zabbatini, all having also a version with a single b. During the Roman Empire time, it existed in the Sabbatinus form. Variations of these names in Latin started to appear already in the 8th century.

Sabbatini and Sabatini have different pronunciations in Italian, since the double b requires a short labial stop between them. The same happens with Sabattini and Sabatini.

The name is a patronymic, i.e., it originated from the name of an ascendant person, and it is related to sabato, Italian for Saturday, indirectly from shabbat (rest), the weekly day of rest holiday for Judaism probably because the person was born in a Saturday. Due to the reference to the Jewish holiday, it has been speculated that people with this surname were New Christians or marranos (Christianized Jews in the medieval times), but this is so far unsubstantiated. What is known for sure is that gentile families used to give the name Sabbato or Sabbatin to children who were born on Saturdays, as they used also Domenico to baptize children born on Sundays. Sabbatini is therefore the plural form used to name the descendants of someone who was named Sabbatin, Sabbatino or Sabbato.

Records indicate that the specific Sabbatini surname appeared for the first time in a noble family in Bologna, in the form Sabbadini. Since the 13th century it is a very specific surname of the region of Marche. Today, it is present also in the Abruzzo region (mainly as Sabatini, but also as Sabatino, Sabatini and Sabbatini) and in the Campania region, around Naples (where the more rare surname Sabbatino is present).

Due to the strong immigration of Italians in the late 19th century and early 20th century, the Sabbatini family name and its variations are strongly present in Brazil (mostly in the Southern and Southeastern regions, specially in the cities of Campinas and Valinhos), Uruguay, Argentina, Chile, Australia and the United States (with higher concentrations in the states of New York, Pennsylvania, Tennessee, Missouri and California).

== Notable people ==
- Andrea Sabbatini (1487–1530), Italian painter of the Renaissance, one of the best pupils of Raphael
- Lorenzo Sabbatini (c. 1530–1576), Italian renaissance painter
- Nicola Sabbatini (1574–1654), Italian architect and engineer
- Galeazzo Sabbatini (1597–1662), Italian musician and composer
- Pietro Paolo Sabbatini (c.1600–1658), Italian composer
- Ludovico Sabbatini (1650–1724), Italian priest and religious teacher
- Gaetano Sabatini (1703–1734), Italian painter
- Francesco Sabatini (1722–1797), Italian architect who worked in Spain
- Luigi Antonio Sabbatini (1732–1809), Italian composer
- Leopoldo Sabbatini (1860–1914), first rector of Bocconi University at Milano
- Rafael Sabatini (1875–1950), Italian/British author
- Amadeo Sabattini (1892–1960), reformist governor of Córdoba Province, Argentina
- Innocenzo Sabbatini (1891–1983), Italian architect
- Enrico Sabbatini (1932–1998), Italian costume designer for the theater and cinema industry
- Renato M.E. Sabbatini (born 1947), Brazilian scientist and writer
- Gabriella Sabbatini (born 1950), Italian poet
- Gaia Sabbatini (born 1999), Italian middle-distance runner
- Giuseppe Sabbatini (born 1957), Italian opera singer
- Gabriela Sabatini (born 1970), Argentine tennis player
- Rory Sabbatini (born 1974), South African professional golfer

== See also ==
- Saturday
- Sabbatani
