= Eduardo Serra (disambiguation) =

Eduardo Serra (1943–2025) was a Portuguese cinematographer

Eduardo Serra may also refer to:

- Eduardo Serra Rexach (born 1946), Spanish politician and businessman
- Eduardo Serra (admiral) (born 1958), Italian naval officer
