= Giulio Gallazzi =

Italian businessman (born 1964)

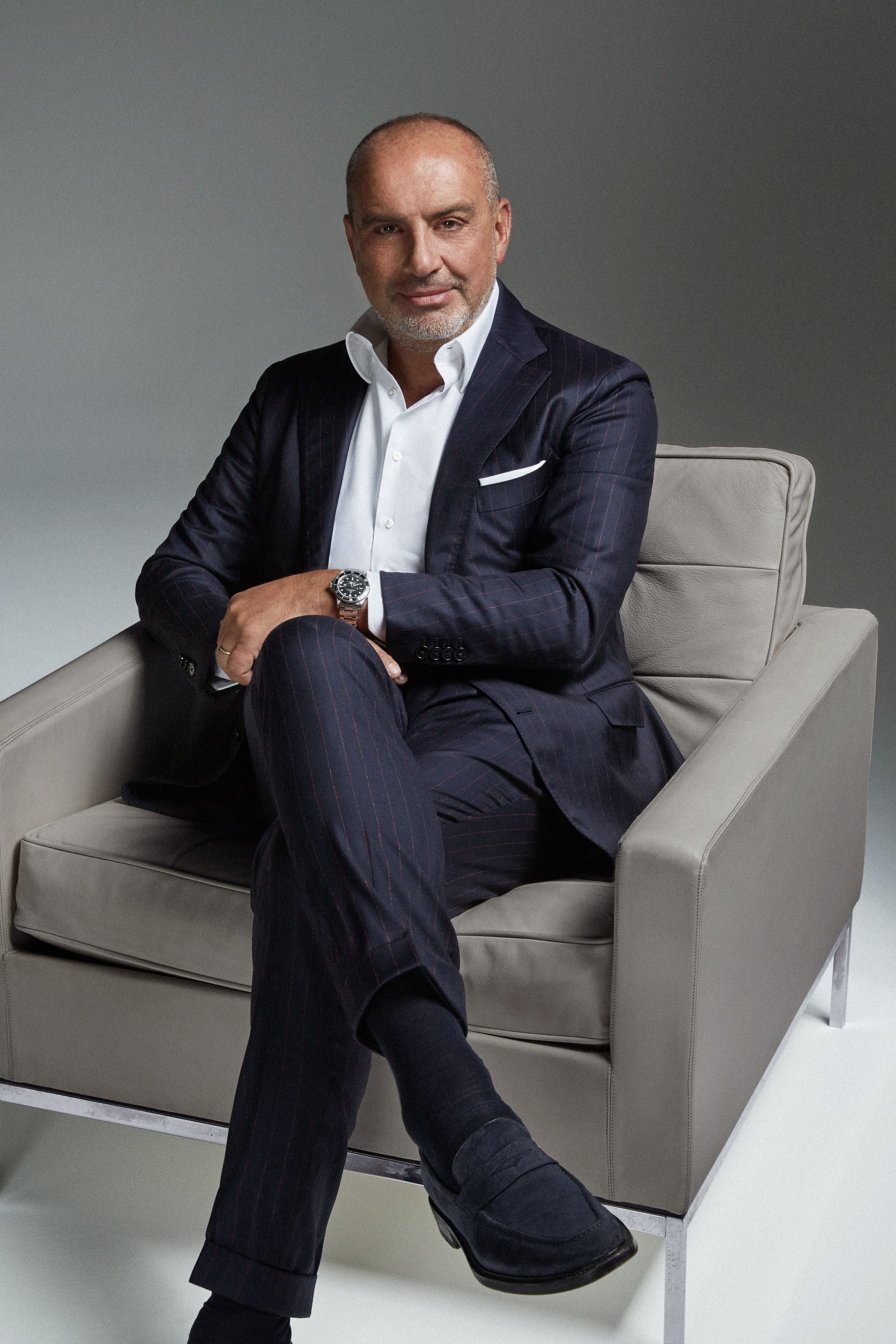
- Giulio Gallazzi during a TV interview
- Born: 8 January 1964 (age 62); Bologna, Italy
- Occupation: Businessman
- Known for: SRI Group

Giulio Gallazzi (born 8 January 1964 in Bologna, Italy) is an Italian businessman. He is the Chairman/CEO of SRI Group, a multinational independent M&A corporate finance consultancy and proprietary Private Equity investments company founded in 2001.

== Life and education ==
Graduated with highest grades in Business and Economics from University of Bologna. Achieved his MBA from SDA Bocconi School of Management, Milan. He completed his studies at Harvard Business School, Boston (USA) as a visiting scholar. Giulio Gallazzi is married to Serena Bortolini and has two children.

== Business career ==
In 2001 he founded SRI Group. Today, SRI Group is a UK-based multinational company operating in corporate investment banking business with its head office in London and operational office in Milan and Rome.

In 2012, the SRI Group started his own direct Private Equity Proprietary investments activity with major focus on New Tech Business Transformation opportunities.

In his career he has served as an independent non executive board member in several Stock Exchange listed industrial and financial companies, among these TIM, MediaForEurope, Danieli, ASTM, Gruppo Carige, Ansaldo STS.

He is the major shareholder of Alcione Milano, the third professional football team in Milan.

In December 2025 SRI Group led an international club deal which acquired 49% of equity shares of one iconic Italian fashion group: Etro

In 2022 he became one of the major shareholders of Gruppo Banca del Fucino, an Italian bank specialising in S.M.E. market.

=== Sports ===
He was an American football player (1984–1989), winning both the Italian championship in Super Bowl VI (1986 - Warriors Bologna) and European championships in Helsinki (1987 - Italian National Team) captaining the Italian team. He was voted MVP in 1988.

== Publications ==
- Gallazzi, Giulio (1997). Egea (ed.). I processi di marketing (1st (print) ed.). Milan: Egea.. Co-written with other experts in the sector.
- Gallazzi, Giulio (2005). Egea (ed.). Profitable customer proximity – Il cliente al centro del pensiero e dell'azione delle aziende; raccolta di esperienze, progetti e best practice (1st (print) ed.). Milan: NPV.. Co-written with other experts in the sector.
- Gallazzi, Giulio (2010). Egea (ed.). La famiglia è ancora un affare? La finanza responsabile, la società e la famiglia (1st (print) ed.). Milan: Cantagalli.. Co-written with L. Melina.
- Gallazzi, Giulio (2011). Libreria Ateneo Salesiano (ed.). Oltre la crisi. Prospettive per un nuovo modello di sviluppo. Il contributo del pensiero realistico dinamico di Tommaso Demaria (1st (print) ed.). Roma: Libreria Ateneo Salesiano.. Co-written with other experts in the sector.
- Gallazzi, Giulio (2013). Cantagalli (ed.). Affari, siete di famiglia? Famiglia e sviluppo sostenibile (1st (print) ed.). Milano: Cantagalli.. Co-written with S. Kampowski.
