= Stefan Siegel =

Italian activist (born 1978)

- Born: 1978 (age 46–47); Merano, South Tyrol, Italy
- Education: Francesco Morosini Naval School
- Alma mater: Vienna University of Economics and Business
- Occupation: Founder/CEO Not Just A Label

Stefan Siegel (born 1978) is the founder of Not Just a Label, an online platform for emerging voices in fashion.

== Early life and education ==
Siegel was born in 1978 in the German speaking province of South Tyrol in northern Italy.

Following his high school career at the Francesco Morosini Naval School, he moved to Vienna and received his MA in International Business Administration and Economics from Vienna University of Economics and Business in 2004.

== Career ==
Siegel worked as a fashion model for brands including Prada, Gucci, BMW, K-Swiss and Calvin Klein. After graduation he worked in finance for firms such as Ernst & Young and private bank Sal. Oppenheim in Zurich, Switzerland.

In 2017, Siegel joined the Merrill Lynch Investment Banking Group as a Senior Analyst in London and New York, specialising in the Consumer & Retail sector and advising publicly listed fashion powerhouses.

Stefan used his experience to launch Not Just a Label. Siegel has spoken at over 100 leading conferences such as the Condé Nast Luxury Conference in 2017 and 2018. Siegel appeared on the BBC, Arte Euromaxx and Bloomberg TV, and is a guest lecturer at universities such as Parsons, London College of Fashion and Central Saint Martins. In 2012, he gave a TED talk based on the theme "The World in the Next Ten Years" at United World College of the Atlantic. Furthermore, he works with agencies such as the European Union, East London Tech City and The British Council, and acted as an advisor to cities of New York, Los Angeles and Dubai.

== Not Just A Label ==
Siegel started Not Just A Label (NJAL) with his brother Daniel. The two came up with the idea for a global web platform to display emerging fashion designers at Siegel's home in East London. Siegel had the experience working within the fashion industry while Daniel was a web developer. NJAL began in 2008. The brothers funded the business until it was cash positive in its second year.

Today, it represents over 35,000 designers in more than 150 countries. NJAL opened temporary stores in Dubai, New York City, Berlin and London, and hosted a fair over four years in Venice, Italy called Origin Passion & Beliefs.

Siegel also encouraged the industry to support designers from lesser known countries, and politically difficult regions. As such he travelled and organised events in locations including Russia, Estonia, Lithuania, and Lebanon as a representative of NJAL. In March 2014, Siegel was the only representative of the Western fashion industry to attend fashion week in Ukraine amidst the political turmoil.
