= Salvatore Aranzulla =

Italian blogger and entrepreneur (born 1990)

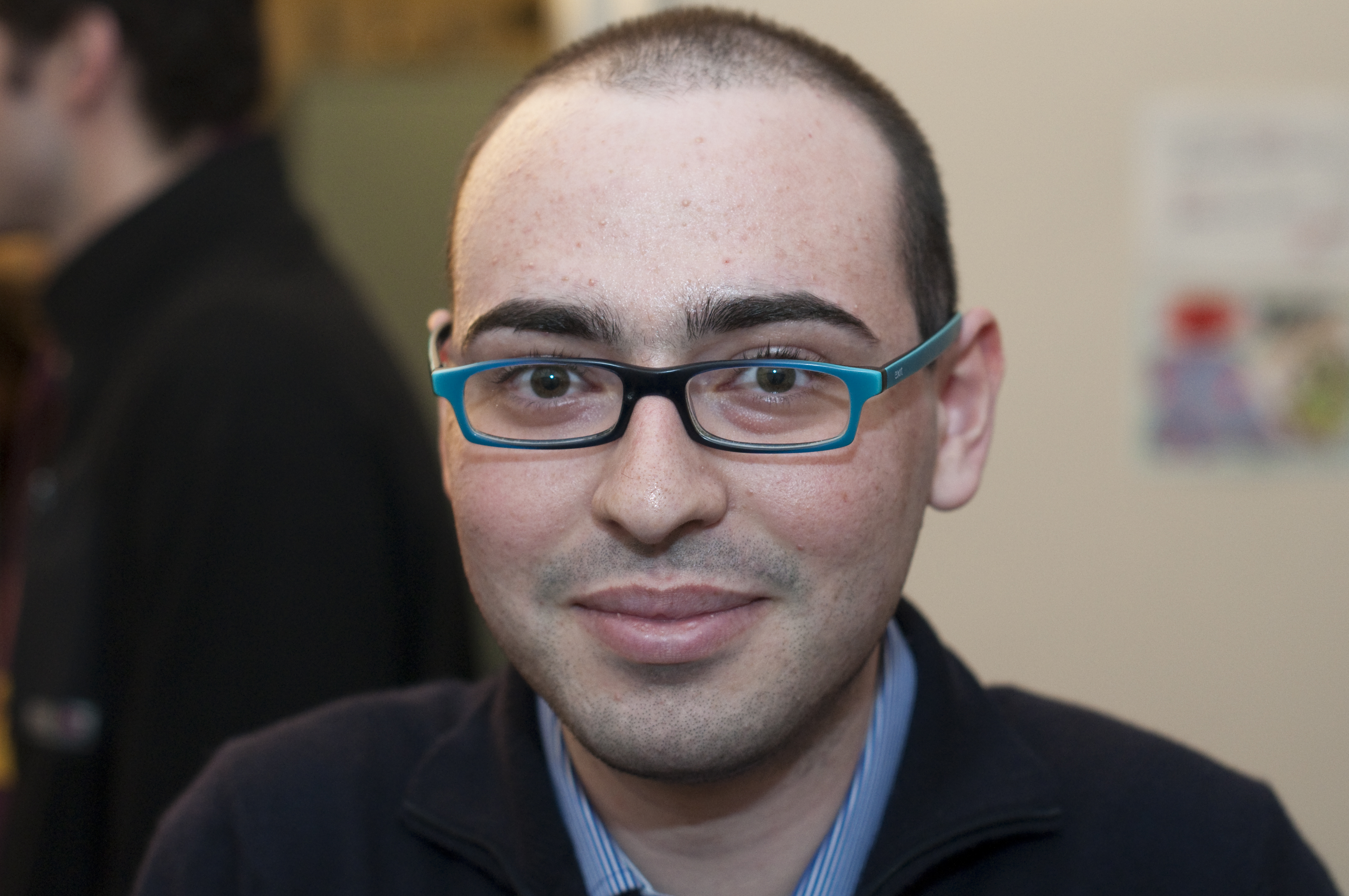
- Aranzulla in 2010
- Born: 24 February 1990 (age 36); Mirabella Imbaccari, Sicily, Italy
- Occupations: blogger, entrepreneur

Salvatore Aranzulla (born 24 February 1990) is an Italian blogger and entrepreneur. He is a well-known popularizer and author of problem solving tutorials for information technology (especially software) by the general Italian public.

== Early life and education ==
Born in Mirabella Imbaccari, a Sicilian hamlet, by parents Giovanni and Maria in a family of four children; his three brothers are Giuseppe, Davide, and Elia. His father was a nurse in Caltagirone hospital and the mother a housekeeper. He attended the scientific high school in Piazza Armerina.

In 2008, he moved to Milan to study at Bocconi University, where he graduated in 2015.

When he was 12, he started reading through the net and soon he began looking after a newsletter and a blog where he published practical advice on solving computer problems, thus becoming the youngest popularizer in Italy. As a teenager, he was also active as a bug hunter for some major websites and web browsers.

== Popularization activities ==
=== Website ===
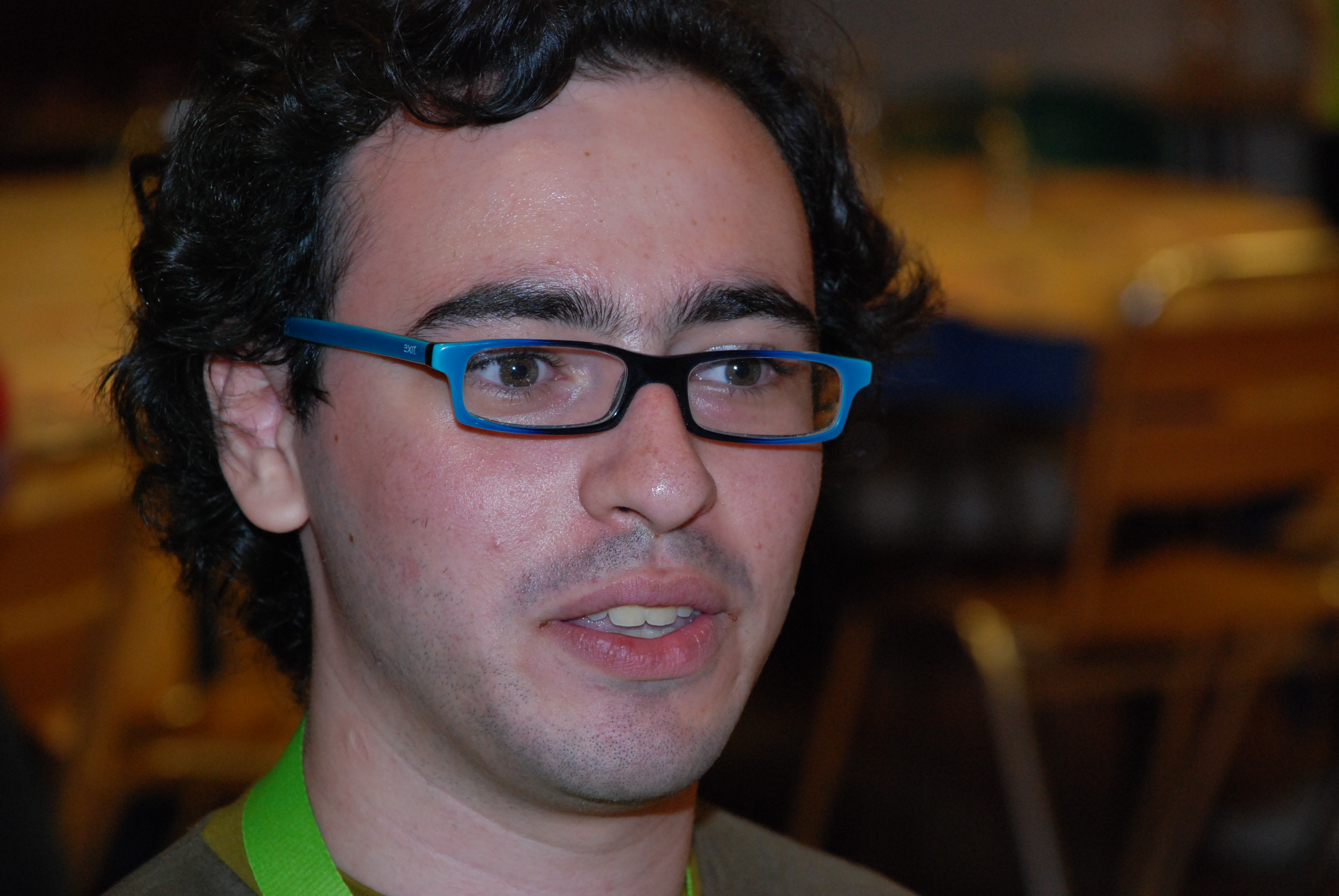
Aranzulla in 2007

His blog had about 300,000 monthly readers between 2007 and 2008. When Aranzulla needed money to go to the university, he started using Google Ads.

In 2016 the readers became 9 million every month, with 20 million page views, and about 500,000 daily in 2015 and 2018 thanks to an accurate use of SEO.

In 2018 the website ranked in the top 30 in Italy (first in the general field of "Information Technology" and with a 40% quota of the "computer news" sector) and in March 2019, it ranked 57th in Italy.

The company, whose sole shareholder is Aranzulla himself, is located in Milan and closed 2014 with a turnover of one million euros, then 1,6 million euros in 2016. In 2017 the annual turnover was two million, in 2019 three million euros. and in 2021 3,8 million euros By 2018 the company has a staff of eight people.

The articles are written by 10 ghostwriters from various parts of Italy, such as Campania, Calabria, Lombardy, Tuscany.

=== Other editorial activities ===
He also wrote the technology column on the web portal Virgilio.it from 2008 to 2015. In 2016 he started a cooperation with the national newspaper Il Messaggero.

== Italian Wikipedia's article deletion ==
In 2016 his article on the Italian Wikipedia was deleted because he was not considered sufficiently relevant. He replied by calling Italian Wikipedia users who proposed his deletion "low-class competitors and sore losers". The page was previously deleted 12 times over a period of 10 days in 2006, because it kept being rewritten probably by himself or close acquaintances.

The debate about the deletion was also publicized on Italian periodics Il Gazzettino, Il Foglio, La Stampa and il Giornale where the deletion was described critically. It was also noted that the deletion was originally requested by a person who owns a website with similar content to the one of Aranzulla.

The issue of deleting the page on Aranzulla was also dealt with during the Report television show.

== Awards and honours ==
In 2018 the website obtained a special recognition for best website by the comune of Perugia at the 2018 Macchianera awards in Perugia

In February 2019, he received the Candelora d'Oro from the comune of Catania.

== In popular culture ==
In 2017 he had a cameo in the music video of the song In the town of Gabry Ponte and Sergio Sylvestre. In 2018 he dubbed a pop-up in the Italian version of Ralph Breaks the Internet. and he was also the Italian poster person for the Netflix television series Black Mirror.

In 2017 he was the protagonist of an episode of the Mediaset program Emigratis, broadcast from Singapore and hosted by Pio and Amedeo.

== Bibliography ==
- Super hacker. I segreti della sicurezza nella nuova era digitale (2012)
- Hacker contro hacker. Manuale pratico e facile di controspionaggio informatico Sperling & Kupfer (2013)
- Il metodo Aranzulla, Mondadori (2018)
