= Ferdinando Bocconi =

Italian entrapreneur and politician

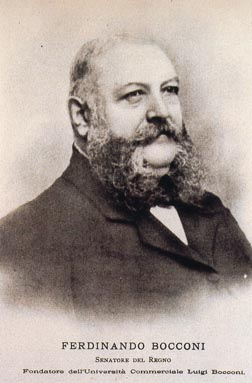
Ferdinando Bocconi

Ferdinando Bocconi (11 November 1836 – 5 February 1908) was an Italian entrepreneur and politician (as Senator of the Kingdom of Italy). He is mostly known for being the founder of Bocconi University in Milan in 1902.

Bocconi was born and died in Milan. He and his brother Luigi became rich founding the Aux villes d'Italie, a great department store that became later the current La Rinascente.

The university was named after his son, Luigi Bocconi, who died in the 1896 Battle of Adwa during the First Italo-Ethiopian War.
