= Francesco Billari =

Italian demographer (1970-)

Rector Università Bocconi Francesco C. Billari

Francesco C. Billari (born 13 October 1970) is an Italian sociologist and demographer, and the Rector of Bocconi University in Milan, as well as Professor of Demography in the Department of Social and Political Sciences.

== Biography ==
He graduated from Bocconi University with a degree in Political Economy in 1994, with a specialization in Statistics and Operations Research. In 1997 he was a Doctoral Fellow at the Max Planck Institute for Human Development in Berlin, and obtained a PhD in demography from the University of Padua (Department of Statistical Sciences) in 1998. From 1999 to 2002 he was the leader of a research group at the Max Planck Institute for Demographic Research in Rostock.

A professor of demography at Bocconi University from 2002 to 2012 (until 2005 Associate and later Full Professor), he subsequently moved to the University of Oxford as Statutory Professor of Sociology and Demography and Director of the Department of Sociology, and as Professorial Fellow at Nuffield College, Oxford, before returning to his alma mater in 2017.

At Bocconi he has also held the roles of Dean for Development, in charge of Alumni relations and Fundraising, founding Director of the Carlo F. Dondena Center for Research on Social Dynamics and Public Policy, Director of the Master of Science in Economic and Social Sciences when it was launched, Dean of the Faculty and Deputy Rector.

On 27 June 2022 he has been appointed by the Bocconi board Rector of the University for the 2022/2024 two-year period; he took office on 1 November 2022, at the end of Gianmario Verona's six-year Rectorship.

== Academic recognitions ==
He has held several academic positions at an international level, including Distinguished International Scholar at the Department of Sociology and the Population Studies Center at the University of Pennsylvania (2008–2009), and visiting professor at the Department of Social and Political Sciences at Universitat Pompeu Fabra in Barcelona (2007).

He was president, Secretary-General and Treasurer of the European Association for Population Studies and President of the Italian Association for Population Studies, a section of the Italian Statistical Society. He has also held positions on the scientific councils of various institutions, including the Center for Demographic Studies at the Institut National d'Études Démographiques, the Netherlands Interdisciplinary Demographic Institute, the Paris School of Economics and the Vienna Institute of Demography.

For his research contributions on demography and study of life courses, sociology and social policies, he was appointed Fellow of the British Academy (2014), Foreign Corresponding Member of the Austrian Academy of Sciences (2014) and Fellow of the European Academy of Sociology (2010).

In 2012, the Population Association of America awarded him the Clifford C. Clogg Award for Mid-Career Achievement. He also received an Honorary Doctorate from the Faculty of Economic, Social and Political Sciences and Communication from Université Catholique de Louvain (2013).

== Research areas ==
His research has been published by generalist journals, such as Nature and PNAS, and by top international journals in the demographic, sociological, statistical and epidemiological fields. He has also held editorial roles at Advances in Life Course Research (as founding editor), Population Studies, Demographic Research and Demography. He has obtained competitive research funding from the European Research Council (Advanced Investigator Grant) and other leading programs at national and international levels.
