= Innocenzo Gasparini Institute for Economic Research =

The Innocenzo Gasparini Institute for Economic Research (IGIER) is an economic research center of Bocconi University. It was launched in 1990 by Francesco Giavazzi, Mario Monti, and Richard Portes as a joint project of Bocconi University, the CEPR and the NBER and named in memory of Innocenzo Gasparini, former rector of Bocconi University.

IGIER is committed to supporting a research community that shares the values and best practices of the international scientific community. To this end, it provides its scholars with an environment that nurtures frontier and rigorous empirical and theoretical research aiming to make a major impact in economics and the social sciences.
