= Sabbatino =

Sabbatino is an Italian surname, a variation of Sabbatini. Notable people with the surname include:

- Aniello Sabbatino (born 2000), Italian rower
- Jules G. Sabbatino (1911–1999), American politician
- Sabbatino, C.A.V.'s legal representative in the U.S.
