= Sabatini (surname) =

Sabatini is an Italian surname, see Sabbatini. Notable people with the surname include:

- Ambra Sabatini (born 2002), Italian athlete
- Anthony Sabatini (born 1988), American politician
- Bernardo L. Sabatini, American neuroscientist
- Bettina Sabatini (born 1966), Italian marathon runner
- David D. Sabatini, Argentine-American cell biologist
- David M. Sabatini (born 1968), American cell biologist and biochemist
- Fabio Sabatini (born 1985), Italian road bicycle racer
- Francesco Sabatini (1722–1797), Italian architect who worked in Spain
- Gabriela Sabatini (born 1970), Argentine female tennis player
- Gabriele Sabatini (1976–2026), Italian football player and coach
- Gaetano Sabatini (1703–1734), Italian draftsman and painter
- Griffin Sabatini (born 1998), Swiss footballer
- Lorenzo Sabatini (c. 1530–1576), Italian painter
- Oriana Sabatini (born 1996), Argentine model, actress and singer
- Pat Sabatini (born 1990), American mixed martial artist
- Rafael Sabatini (1875–1950), Italian-British author
- Roberto Sabatini (born 1969), Italian-Australian aerospace researcher and academic
- Sandra Sabatini (born 1959), Canadian writer
- Walter Sabatini (born 1955), Italian former association football player
