= Not Just a Label =

London and Los Angeles-based global fashion industry platform

Not Just A Label (NJAL)
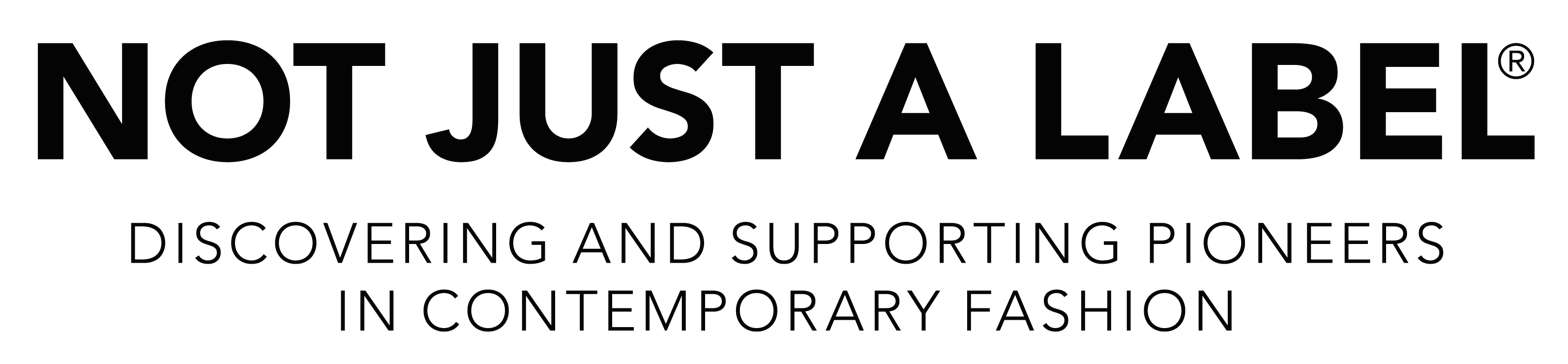
- Industry: Fashion
- Founded: 2008
- Founder: Stefan Siegel
- Headquarters: Los Angeles, United States
- Area served: Worldwide
- Owner: Stefan Siegel
- Website: www.notjustalabel.com

Not Just A Label (NJAL) is a London and Los Angeles–based global fashion industry platform, virtual showroom, and online community that connects independent designers with consumers. Representing more than 35,000 designers from over 150 countries, NJAL has launched the careers of designers such as Mary Katrantzou and Damir Doma and has support from celebrities such as Lady Gaga, Vivienne Westwood and Beyoncé.

In February 2019, NJAL launched a premium designer service, NJAL+, a program that enables shoppable capabilities and provide additional tools.

== History ==
Stefan Siegel and his brother Daniel founded NJAL in 2008 to serve as a networking platform for fashion designers. NJAL launched "The Shop" section of their website in 2009, making it the first e-commerce site to allow consumers to buy directly from designers. Select items in "The Shop" were curated by celebrities including Amanda Lepore and Lara Stone.

For the Spring/Summer 2010 season, NJAL released a limited edition offering of organic cotton T-shirts and tank tops featuring signature designs and prints of designers. In 2011, NJAL collaborated with Spanish label Mango in a competition where young designers presented collections at the 'El Botón' Mango Fashion Awards with NJAL supervising competitors. The same year, the site won the Drapers Etail Award for Best E-Commerce innovation.

NJAL first collaborated with the British Council in 2011 for the "London Meets Beirut" seminar. In March 2012, NJAL received a grant from the British Council to travel to India during Lakmé Fashion Week in order to develop business relationships in the country.

In 2012, NJAL participated in a three-week tour of Eastern European fashion weeks where the company delivered workshops and scouted talent in Bratislava, Kyiv, Łódź, Belgrade and Riga. The trips were documented through a partnership with Vogue Italia. The same year, online-trend analysis and research service WGSN offered NJAL designers services at a 98 percent discount in order to support young talent while expanding the WGSN professional network.

NJAL began The Open Source Partnership with Vivienne Westwood in 2013. NJAL advised the fashion house on expanding their e-commerce business and creating a new open-source website for Westwood. In turn, Westwood became a major investor in the platform.

NJAL collaborated with the Who's Next fashion trade show in 2013 to create "The Future of Fashion" program where twenty emerging designers competed for the chance to show their designs during the Who's Next Autumn/Winter Paris trade show. Selected designers showed their collections at the 2014 Who's Next show with Siegel as one of the judges of the competition.

In 2014, NJAL partnered with Matteo Marzotto and the Fiera di Vicenza center to hold the company's first offline event called "Origin Passion & Beliefs." 100 NJAL designers participated in order to showcase their wares and network with others in the fashion industry. The same year, NJAL was the only international platform to attend Ukrainian Fashion Week during the political turbulence occurring at the time.

NJAL curated and managed the launch of the AEG produced documentary "The Next Black" about the future of textiles. The film was released in conjunction with the release of new high efficiency washing machines. At the 2014 Copenhagen Fashion Summit, NJAL presented plans for the "Re-start Fashion" initiative, developed to help designers solve ecological challenges in the fashion industry through sustainable design.

NJAL relaunched its website in 2014 to improve the user experience on smartphones, tablets, and desktops. While the e-commerce part of the site was established in 2009, the 2014 relaunch made sales the main component of the site. The relaunch also incorporated an open source content management system into the site which allows designers to edit their own profiles.

In 2017, NJAL closed “The Shop” in order to focus on the core components of the community that helped designers gain exposure and network.

The next year, NJAL launched a brand new website in conjunction with their ten-year anniversary.

In February 2019, NJAL launched their premium designer service called NJAL+. Working with a network of brands across industries, NJAL+ provides designers with exciting shoppable capabilities and tools that include services and products in sales, marketing, manufacturing, education and showcasing.

== Notable designers and celebrity clients ==
Notable designers who showcased early on with NJAL include Mary Katrantzou, Damir Doma and Rad Hourani. Celebrities who have purchased items from designers showcased on NJAL include Rihanna, Lady Gaga, Alice Dellal, Pixie Geldof, Paris Hilton, Taylor Swift, Katie Holmes, Whitney Houston, Fergie, Elle Mcpherson and Beyoncé.

== Business model ==
NJAL is a platform for designers, buyers, press and consumers to collaborate with each other independently.

The NJAL platform helps designers to gain exposure in the fashion industry at no cost, promoting a designer's creativity and individuality. Representatives from NJAL visit fashion week events, institutions, showrooms and studios looking for emerging designers with established look-books before providing exposure via editorial coverage and social media. Designers are also able to approach NJAL independently.

The online community opens up a space for designers to gain exposure and network with their peers. The platform includes a search capability and designer directory indexed alphabetically as well as by country, womenswear, menswear, shoes, bags, accessories, jewellery, organic products, etc.

== NJAL+ ==
NJAL offers a premium service called NJAL+ that designers can join by paying a small fee. The service provides a shoppable capability and additional tools for services and products in sales, marketing, manufacturing, education and showcasing. NJAL+ links designers with consumers who then go to a designer's own website for purchase. Notable brands that are part of NJAL+ include WWD, UPS.
