= Sarfatti Building =

- Edificio Sarfatti (Italian)
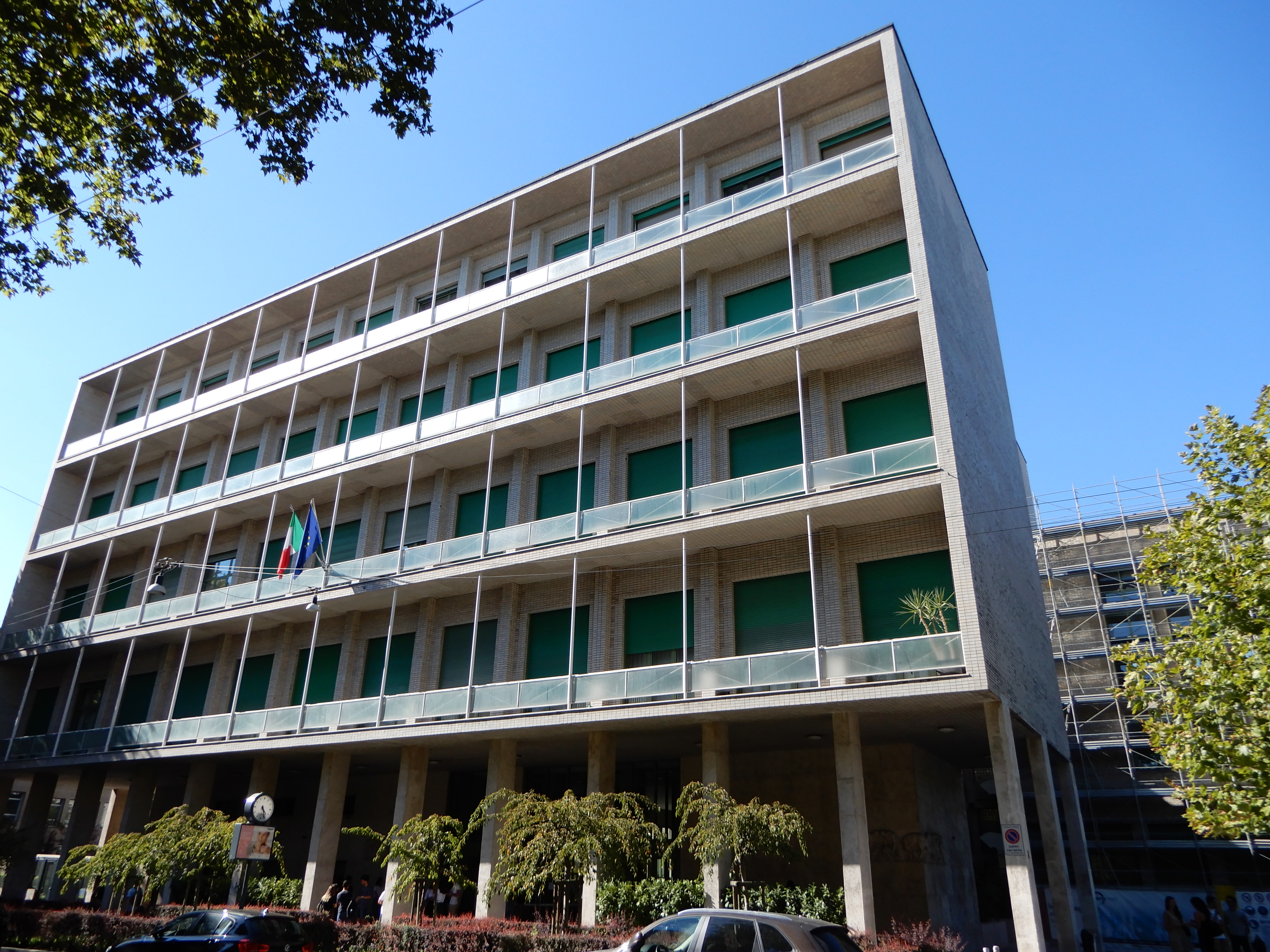
- Sarfatti Building in Milan
- Click on the map for a fullscreen view

General information
- Location: Milan, Italy
- Coordinates: 45°26′55.68″N 9°11′23.62″E

Design and construction
- Architect(s): Giuseppe Pagano

The Sarfatti Building (Italian: Edificio Sarfatti) is an office and educational building on the Bocconi University campus in Milan, Italy, at Via Sarfatti 25.

== History ==
The construction of the building, designed by Italian architect Giuseppe Pagano and his associate Gian Giacomo Predaval, commenced in 1937. The inauguration was held on December 21, 1941. The structure was the first built and corresponds to the original nucleus of the Bocconi University campus after its seat was moved from a palazzo in largo Treves in Milan.

== Description ==
The building is considered one of the finest works of Italian Rationalist architecture.

It features a cross-shaped plan, probably inspired by Walter Gropius' Bauhaus Dessau (1925–1926). Two lion statues in medieval style, created by sculptor Arturo Martini, preside over the interior of building's main entrance hallway. Below the porch alongside via Sarfatti some bas-reliefs by Leone Todi can be found.

== Gallery ==
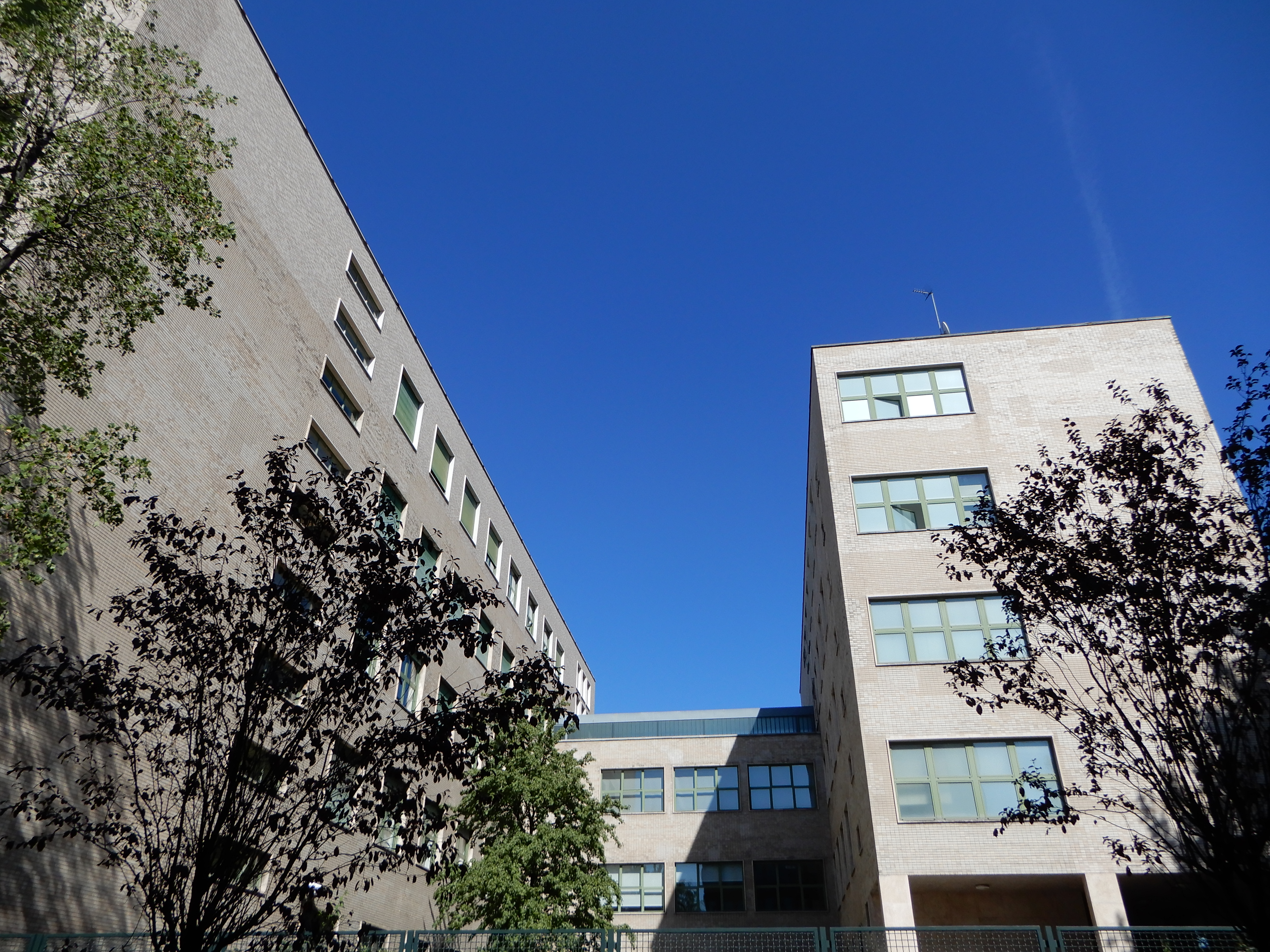

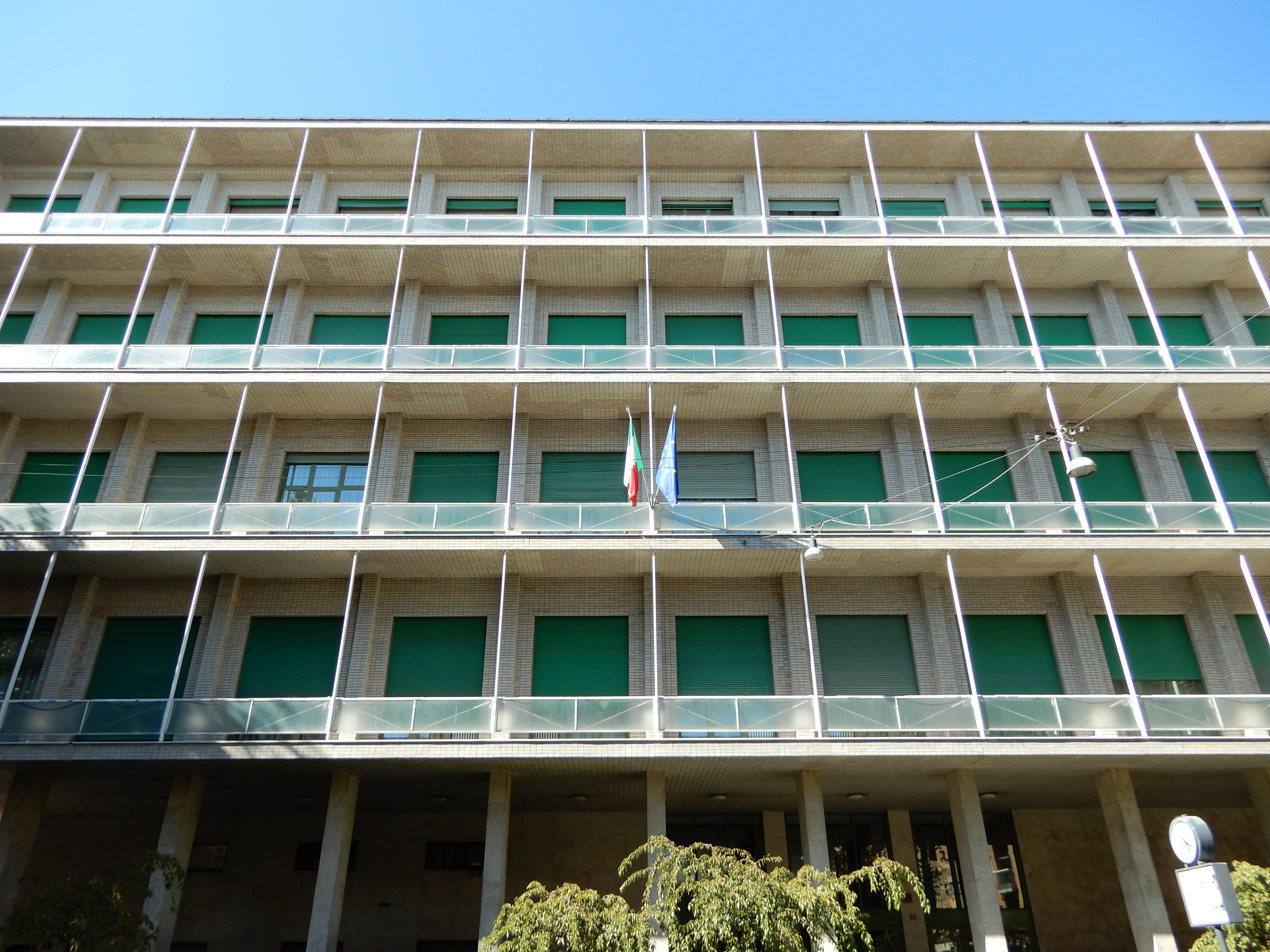

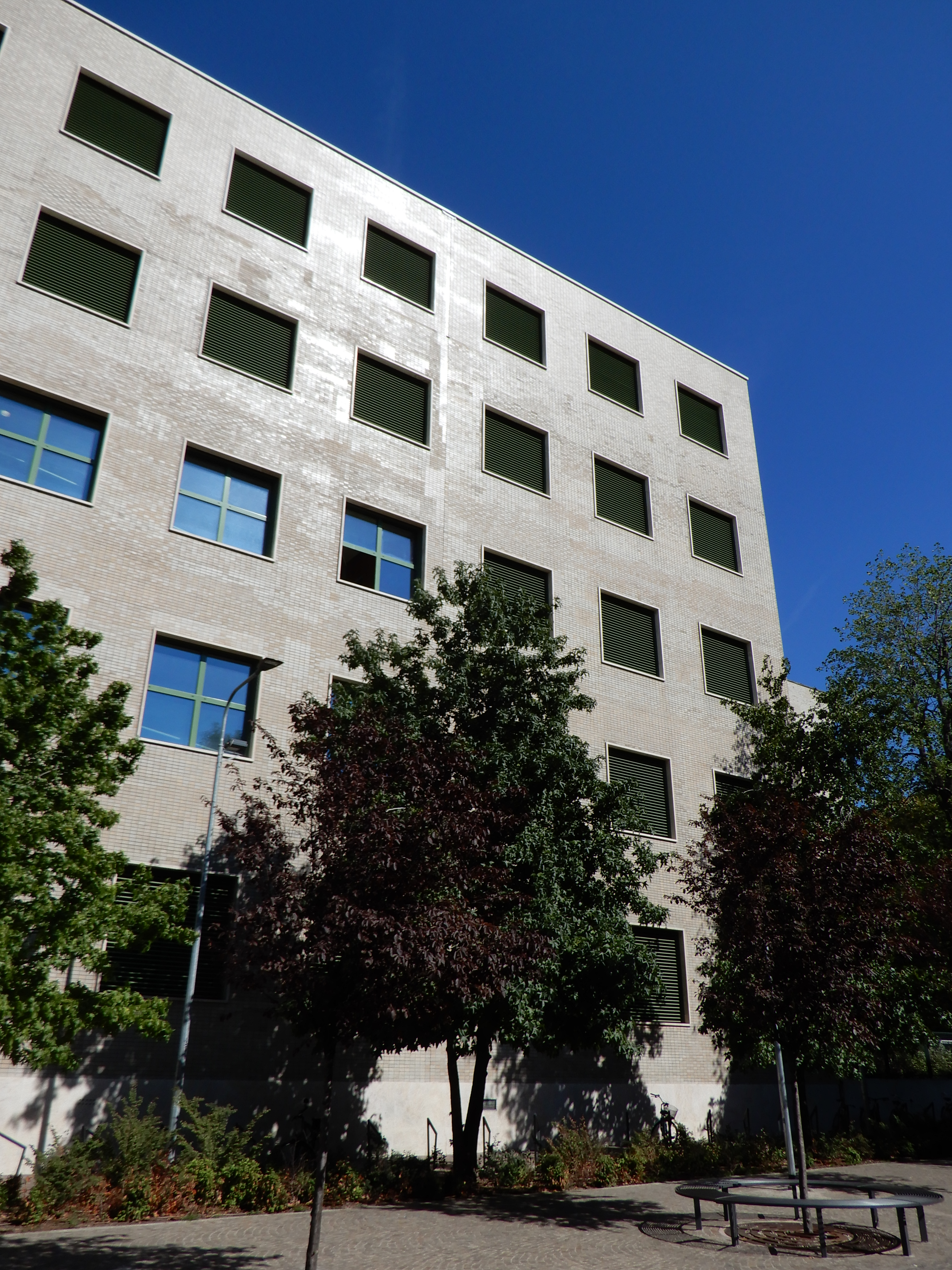

== See also ==
- Roentgen Building
- New SANAA Campus
