= Alessandro Profumo =

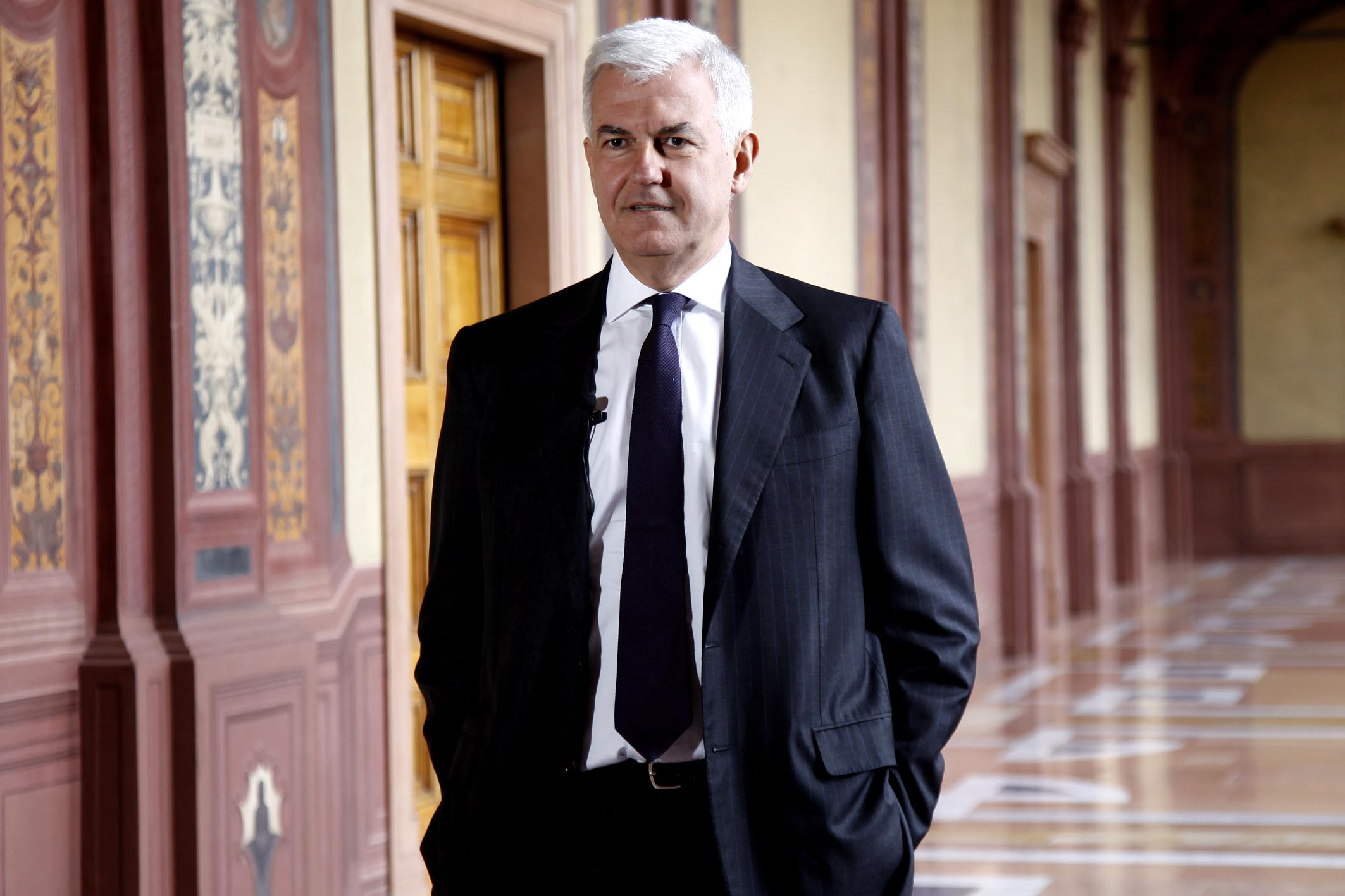
- Education: Bocconi University

Alessandro Profumo is an Italian business executive, and a former CEO of Leonardo S.p.A. (formerly Finmeccanica).

Profumo began his career as a consultant at McKinsey & Company and Bain & Company. As a CEO of Unicredit, he played a role in the bank's expansion through mergers with HypoVereinsbank, Bank Austria Creditanstalt, and Capitalia, which increased the institution's international presence. He resigned in September 2010.

== Early life ==
Born in Genoa on 17 February 1957, Profumo was the youngest of five children. He grew up in Palermo, and later moved to Milan with his family in 1970, where he attended Liceo Manzoni. He later enrolled at Bocconi University but initially left to support his family, taking a position at Banco Lariano. He completed his degree in Business Economics in 1987.

== Career ==
Profumo began his tenure as CEO of UniCredit in 1998, a period marked by significant organizational growth and structural changes. In 2005, he was appointed chairman of the supervisory board of HypoVereinsbank (HVB).

In April 2012, Profumo became chairman of the Italian bank Banca Monte dei Paschi di Siena. In 2015, he was acquitted in the Brontos case, a tax fraud case involving UniCredit and Barclays, as the judge ruled that "the fact did not exist".

In 2017, he was appointed CEO of Leonardo S.p.A., an Italian multinational specializing in aerospace, defense, and security.

== Honors and recognition ==
- 2004: Knight of the Order of Merit for Labour ("Cavaliere al Merito del Lavoro") of the Italian Republic, awarded by President Carlo Azeglio Ciampi
- 2019: Recognized as Best CEO in the Defense Industry by Business Worldwide Magazine

== Personal life ==
In 1977, Profumo married Sabina Ratti, and they have one son, Marco, born the same year.
