= Sebastian Rocca =

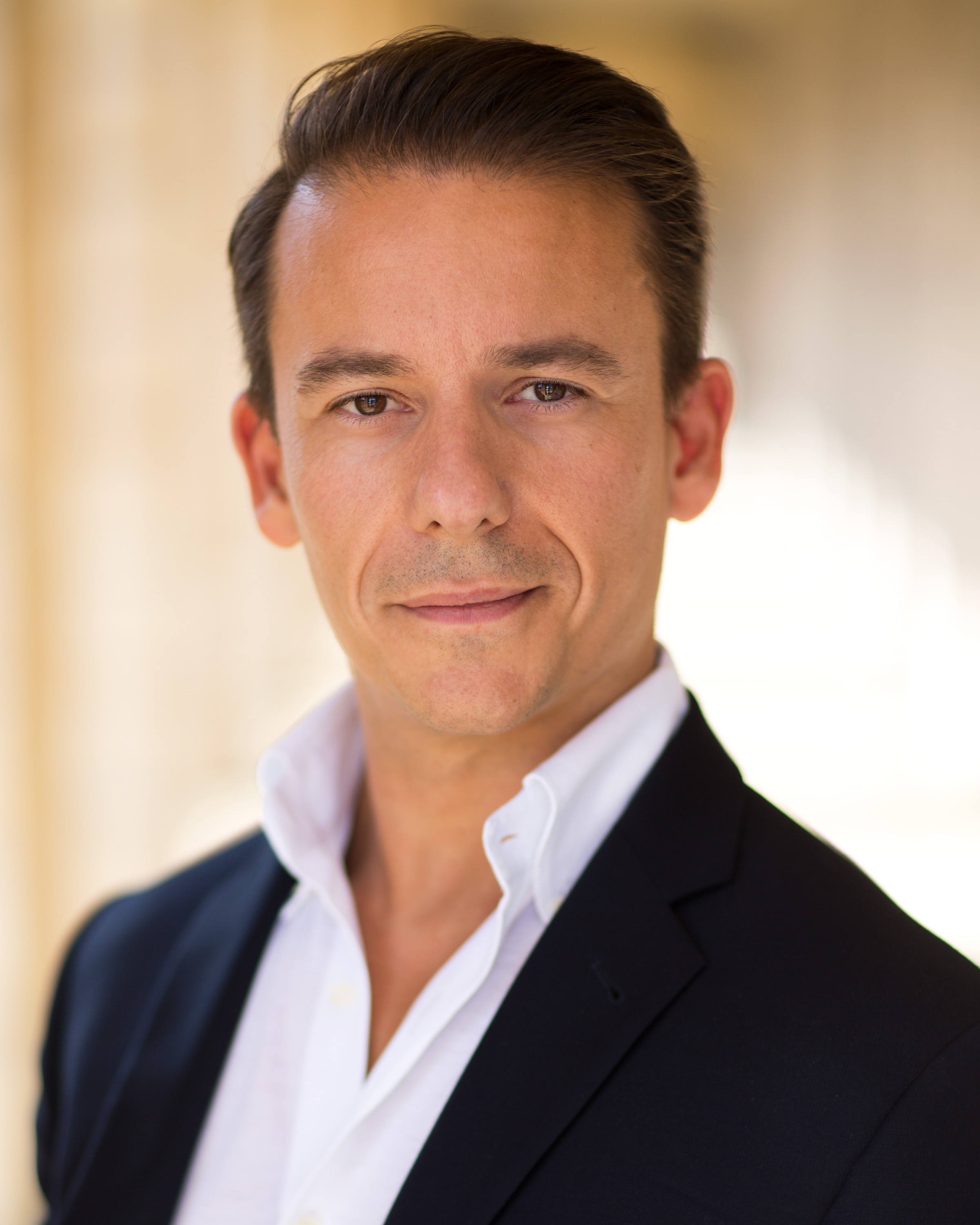
- Rocca in London, 2018
- Education: MSc, Economics; MSc Poverty Reduction and Development Management
- Alma mater: Bocconi University, University of Birmingham
- Occupations: Social entrepreneur, LGBTI activist
- Known for: Founder & CEO of Micro Rainbow, human rights, LGBTI advocacy
- Website: www.microrainbow.org

Sebastian Rocca is a social entrepreneur, coach, and LGBTQI rights activist. He is the founder and CEO of Micro Rainbow and the founding chair of the Micro Rainbow International Foundation.

Rocca has been involved in the process of building scalable models for social change to advance LGBTQI rights.

== Education ==
Rocca holds a MSc in Economics (2003) from Bocconi University in Milan, Italy, and a MSc in Poverty Reduction and Development Management (2005) from the University of Birmingham in England.

== Career ==
=== Micro Rainbow ===
Founded in 2012, and headquartered in London, Micro Rainbow (MR) is a community interest company and not-for-profit social enterprise in the UK.

=== International Lesbian, Gay, Bisexual, Transgender and Intersex Association ===
From 2010 to 2012, Rocca served as Executive Director of the world federation of LGBTI organisations known as ILGA. Under his leadership, ILGA re-obtained ECOSOC status at the United Nations, doubled its budget and membership, and opened a representation office in Geneva, Switzerland.

In addition to managing projects in Latin America, Asia, and Africa, Rocca lobbied the UN, while working closely with government officials and grassroots organisations. ILGA was awarded a World Pride Award alongside United States Secretary of State Hillary Clinton at the 2012 WorldPride in London.

=== UK Lesbian and Gay Immigration Group ===
Rocca was Executive Director of the UK Lesbian and Gay Immigration Group (now known as Rainbow Migration) from 2006 to 2009. During his directorship, UKLGIG was awarded the Black LGBT Community Award by UK Black Pride and Stonewall's Community Group of the Year in 2008.
