= Dondena Centre =

Italian research center

The Carlo F. Dondena Centre for Research on Social Dynamics was established at Bocconi University in 2006. It aims to promote, coordinate and conduct interdisciplinary research on social dynamics, with emphasis on medium- and long-term processes and on comparative analysis.

== Areas of interest ==
Researchers involved in the Centre include demographers, economists, experts in law, political scientists, social psychologists, and statisticians.

The main areas of interest of the Centre are:

- demography and the life course, e.g.
  - fertility and family dynamics
  - intergenerational relationships and ageing
  - transitions to adulthood
  - migration
  - lifelong learning
  - social networks
  - medium- and long-range forecasting
  - labour market
  - social mobility
- development and social cohesion, e.g.
  - inequality
  - social norms and economic development
  - polarization
  - integration of migrants and second generations
- welfare state and public policies, e.g.
  - social policies in comparative perspective
  - Europeanisation and regional issues
- data collection and harmonisation, including creation of a data archive.
