= Sabbatani =

Sabbatani is an Italian surname, a variation of Sabbatini. Notable people with the surname include:

- Marco Sabbatani (born 1989), Italian baseball player
- Max Sabbatani (born 1975), Italian motorcycle road racer
