= Francesco Morosini Naval Military School =

Italian naval military school

Coordinates: 45.4252°N 12.3653°E

- Scuola militare navale "Francesco Morosini"
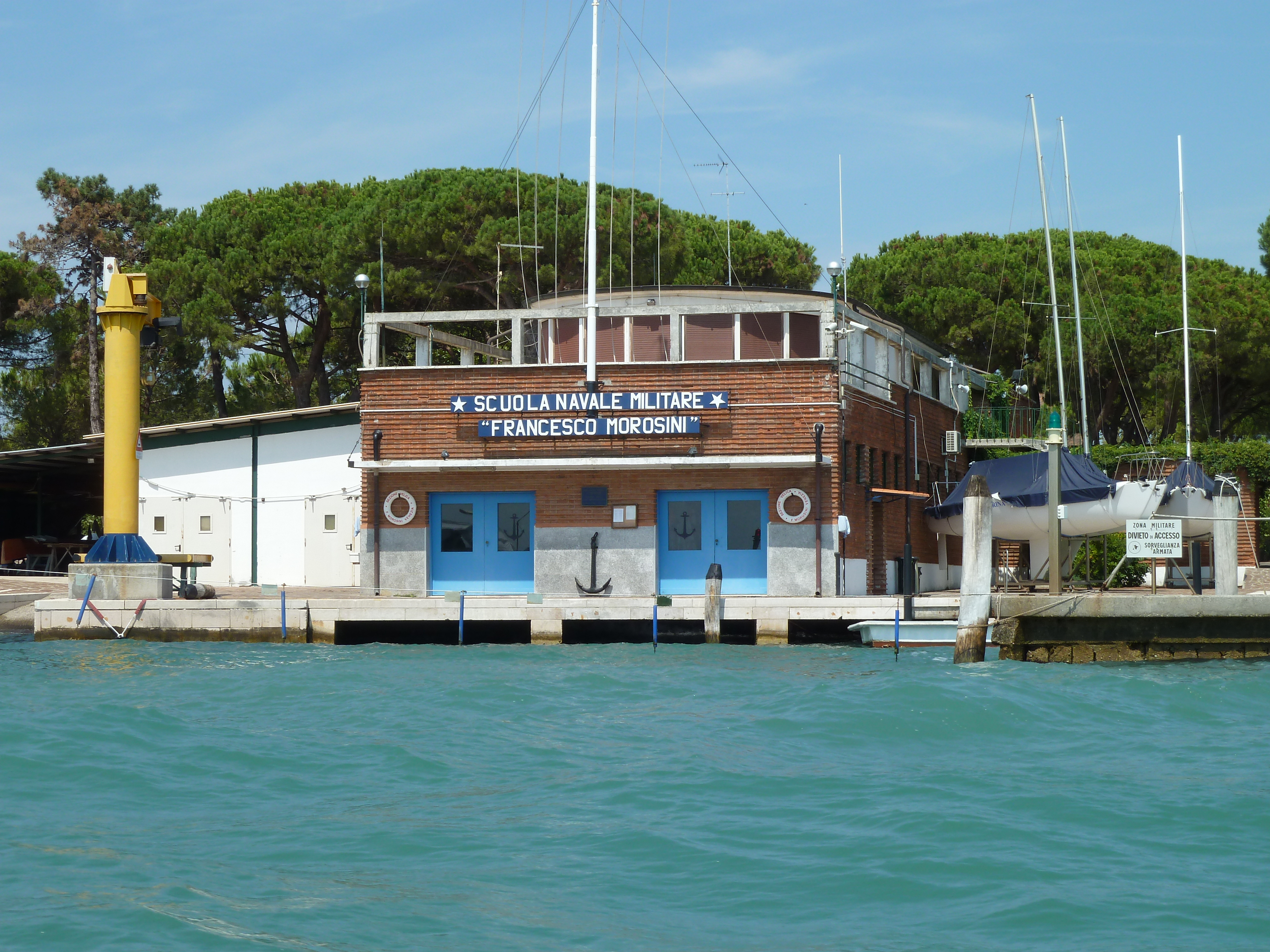
- Type: Military college
- Established: 1937
- Location: Venice, Italy
- Website: www.marina.difesa.it/il-tuo-futuro-e-il-mare/formazione-in-marina/morosini/Pagine/default.aspx

The Francesco Morosini Naval Military School (Italian: Scuola militare navale "Francesco Morosini") is a military education college based in Venice operated by the Italian Navy and named after the great venetian Doge.

Boys and girls of an age between 15 and 18 years old, after having positively passed the admission process, are enrolled to attend the last three high school years. Cadets' military and vocational education is provided both by civil teachers and naval officers in order to promote, in addition to regular studies, interest and love for life at sea through various related activities like sailing, rowing, swimming etc., preparing them to their future careers.

== History ==
A naval boarding school was established on the island of S. Elena in Venice in 1937, and it was named Italian Lictor Youth Naval College ("Collegio Navale della Gioventù Italiana del Littorio"). It aimed to encourage young men to engage in activities related to the sea and to prepare them to enroll in the Regia Marina. In 1945, after Italy's defeat in World War II the School was closed. In 1961, the boarding school opened again and it was named after doge Francesco Morosini. It allowed boys to attend here the last three years of high school. In 1998, the School obtained military status and it was therefore renamed "Scuola navale militare Francesco Morosini". In 2009, girls were allowed to attend the School. The goal of the school is to nurture an interest in seafaring careers. Director Stefano Alleva created an eleven episode film series about life at the school. Many foreign dignitaries visit the school, including U.S. President Jimmy Carter in 1980.

== Activities and facilities ==
The school is contained on the southeastern quarter of the island of S. Elena, encompassing 47,000 square meters.

Special care has been dedicated to seamanship and maritime sports, with great facilities and professional instructors for sailing, yachting and rowing. During summer students cruise on the “Amerigo Vespucci” as crew.

== Notable alumni ==
- Prince Amedeo, Duke of Aosta
- Luigi Binelli Mantelli, former Italy chief of Defence
- Giampaolo Di Paola, former Italy ministry of Defence
- Alberto Gallo, fund manager
- Manfredi Lefebvre d'Ovidio, billionaire businessman
- Eduardo Serra (admiral), Italian admiral.
- Stefan Siegel, fashion technology businessman

== See also ==
- TheRuggiero di Lauria-class ironclad Francesco Morosini.
- TheFrancesco Caracciolo-class battleship Francesco Morosini.

== Bibliography ==
- Andrea Tirondola, Pale a prora! Storia della Scuola navale militare "Francesco Morosini" e dell'istruzione marinaresca a Venezia dalla Serenissima ai giorni nostri, 2012, ISBN 9788897221050
