= Gino Zaccaria =

Italian philosopher and academic

Gino Zaccaria is an Italian philosopher known for his work on phenomenology, ontology, and aesthetics, particularly in relation to poetry. He is Senior Professor (Italian: "professore senior") of Philosophy and Aesthetics at Bocconi University in Milan.

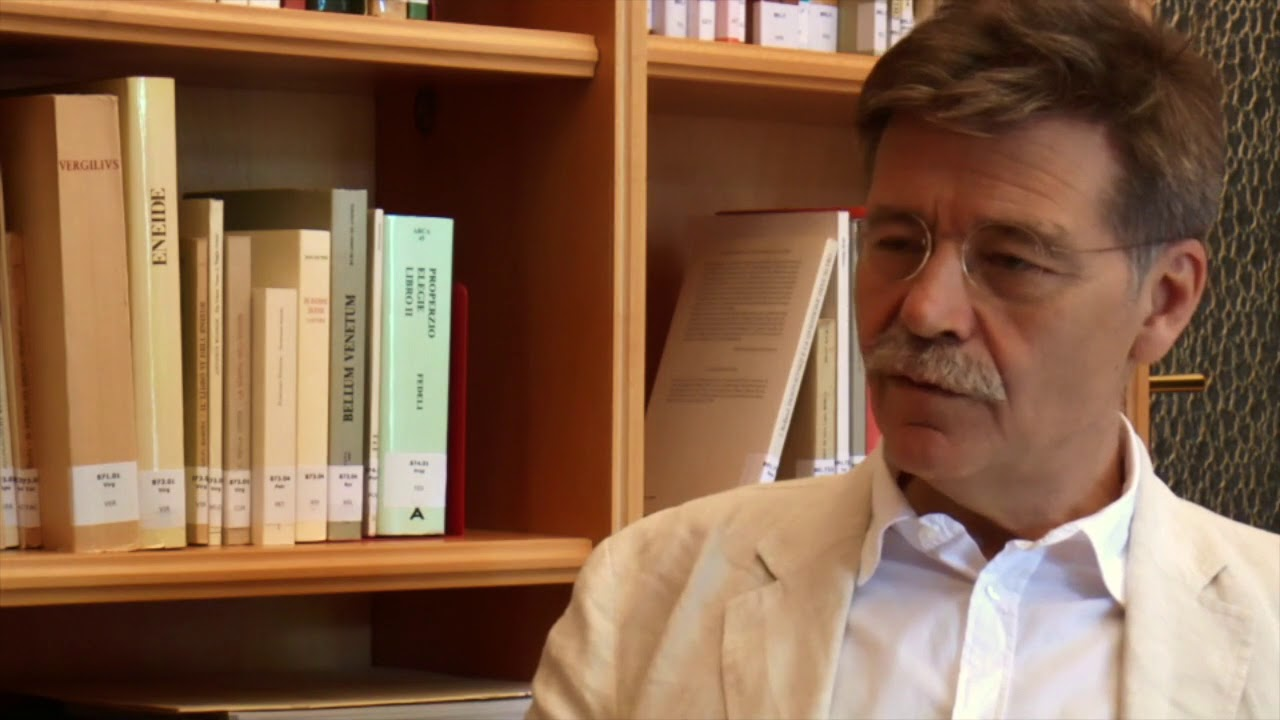
Gino Zaccaria (Bocconi University, Milan).

== Education and career ==
Classically educated, Zaccaria studied at Bocconi University and the École des Hautes Études en Sciences Sociales in Paris. He initially worked in logic and linguistic pragmatics before turning to philosophical hermeneutics and phenomenology. He is also the co-director of the journal eudia – Yearbook for Philosophy, Poetry and Art. Since 2012, he has been involved in the trans-disciplinary project ScienzaNuova, exploring the relation between philosophy and the natural sciences.

== Reception and influence ==
Contemporary reviews and critical responses note that, in Italy, his editions of Heidegger's Political Writings (1998) and The Origin of the Work of Art (2000, with Ivo De Gennaro) prompted sustained critical discussion in the press and in specialist venues.In 2024, a Festschrift titled Verso gli speranti. Scritti in onore di Gino Zaccaria ("Towards the Hoping Things: Writings in Honor of Gino Zaccaria") was published. Contributors included Columbia University philosopher Achille C. Varzi. His essay, "I limiti del linguaggio e la via negativa" (The Limits of Language and the Negative Way), critically analyzed Zaccaria's 2021 book The Enigma of Art, focusing on its contribution to the English philosophical lexicon, such as the use of the term ''beënt'' to clarify the phenomenological concept of being (essente).

== Selected works (English) ==
Books

- The Dictatorship of Value. Teaching and Research in the Planetary University (with Ivo De Gennaro), Milan–New York: McGraw-Hill, 2011. ISBN 9788838672873
- The Enigma of Art. On the Provenance of Artistic Creation, Leiden–Boston: Brill, 2021. ISBN 9789004448704
- Science under the Yoke of Value. A Phenomenological Inquiry into the Evaluation Machinery (with Maurizio Borghi and Ivo De Gennaro), London: Routledge, 2025. ISBN 9780367681616

Book Chapters

- "Time and Value," in I. De Gennaro, H. Hofmeister, R. Lüfter (eds), Academic Freedom in the European Context: Legal, Philosophical and Institutional Perspectives, London: Palgrave Macmillan, 2021. ISBN 9783030869335
- "The Dictatorship of Value. Teaching and Research in the Planetary University," in I. De Gennaro (ed.), Value, Leiden–Boston: Brill, 2012. ISBN 9789004218161

Journal Articles

- "Das Nichts denken (Leopardi)," Heidegger Studies 19 (2003). ISBN 9783428111985
- "The Fiction of Peer Review. Phenomenology of a Catastrophe" (with Ivo De Gennaro), eudia, year 12 (2018). ISSN 2281-9193

== Selected works (Italian) ==
=== Books ===
- L'etica originaria [Originary Ethics] (in Italian). Milan: EGEA. 1992. ISBN 88-238-0194-X.
- L'inizio greco del pensiero [The Greek Onset of Thought] (in Italian). Milan: Marinotti. 1999. ISBN 978-88-8273-007-9.
- Lingua pensiero canto [Mother-speech, Thought, Song] (in Italian) (2nd ed.). Pavia: Ibis. 2014. ISBN 978-88-7164-351-9.
- La provenienza dell'arte. Atena e l'enigma [The Provenance of Art: Athena and the Enigma] (in Italian). Pavia: Ibis. 2015. ISBN 978-88-7164-491-2.
- Pensare il nulla [Thinking the Null] (in Italian) (4th ed.). Pavia: Ibis. 2015. ISBN 978-88-7164-358-8.
- Meditazioni scismatiche. Il nulla e il tempo, l'infinito e l'arte [Schismatic Meditations: The Null and Time, the Infinite and Art] (in Italian). Florence: Olschki. 2022. ISBN 978-88-222-6830-3.
