= Cristian Servidei =

Italian footballer (born 1972)

Personal information
- Date of birth: December 11, 1972 (age 53)
- Place of birth: Bagnacavallo, Italy
- Height: 1.83 m (6 ft 0 in)
- Position: Defender

Senior career*
Years	Team	Apps	(Gls)
1989–1993	SPAL	71	(0)
1993–1994	Venezia	41	(1)
1995	Padova	3	(0)
1995–1997	Lecce	57	(2)
1997–1998	Roma	6	(0)
1998–2001	Ternana	33	(2)
2001–2002	SPAL	12	(1)
2002–2003	Pistoiese	25	(1)
2003–2005	Castel San Pietro	36	(1)
2005–2006	Venezia	29	(0)
2006–2009	SPAL	71	(0)
- * Club domestic league appearances and goals

Cristian Servidei (born December 11, 1972, in Bagnacavallo) is an Italian former professional footballer.

He played in the Serie A in the 1994/95 season (3 games for Calcio Padova) and in the 1997/98 season (6 games for A.S. Roma).
