= Eduardo Serra (admiral) =

Italian naval officer (born 1958)

- Born: March 19, 1958 (age 68)
- Military career
- Allegiance: Italy
- Branch: Italian Navy
- Rank: Vice admiral Italian: Ammiraglio di Squadra
- Commands: Commander Maritime Command South; Italian frigate Aliseo (F574); Francesco Mimbelli (D561)

Vice Admiral Eduardo Serra is an Italian naval officer.

He attended the Francesco Morosini Naval Military School in Venice from 1973 to 1976 before attending the Italian Naval Academy from 1976 to 1980.

He was appointed Commander Maritime Command South on 6 November 2015 with a promotion to vice admiral in 2017, a position he held until October 2017. On 27 October 2017 he was appointed Commander of Logistics Command.

== Education ==
He obtained a degree in Maritime and Naval Science from the University of Pisa.
