= Leopoldo Sabbatini =

Italian educator

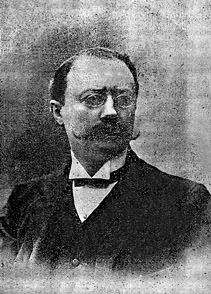
Leopoldo Sabbatini

Leopoldo Sabbatini (14 July 1861, Camerino, Marche, Italy – 1914, Milan, Italy) was an Italian lawyer, the first dean and president of Bocconi University, the first business school in Italy.

His parents were Eugenio Sabbatini and Silvia Piermarini. He started to study law in 1879 at the University of Pisa, graduating with a thesis on commercial law in 1883. He also married very young, in 1880. Soon after that, he was admitted as vice-secretary of the Commerce Chamber of Milano, where he was instrumental in achieving the first comprehensive survey and publication of statistics about commerce and industry in Milano. In his free time, Sabbatini collaborated with Antonio Maffi in the management of popular schools for adults of both sexes, which had been founded on 1875 by workers and artisans associations.

In the year 1897, Sabbatini was presented to Ferdinando Bocconi, a publisher who founded and owned a chain of big magazines, Alle città d'Italia. He wanted to pay homage to his son Luigi, who had been killed at the Battle of Adua, during the Italian-Ethiopian War in 1896, by establishing a school of commerce with his name. Bocconi's brother was a member of the Chamber of Commerce and introduced him to Sabbatini. Bocconi wanted a radical departure from the traditional Italian universities, which were too much theoretical and very little pragmatic in business education. Sabbatini took the bait and presented to Bocconi a school where economic sciences would be the key discipline, which would permeate the entire cycle of studies, in order to provide the future business leaders the tools to understand and to practice in the real world.

Sabbatini stated that the University's mission should be to "promote harmony between school and life". The proposal was very well received by Bocconi and other Milanesi businessmen and within two years the Universitá Commerciale "Luigi Bocconi" was founded. Sabbatini became president and later dean of the University, where he worked indefatigably and with great management acumen until his premature death, in 1914.

Leopoldo Sabbatini was also an important player in the creation of a federation of all chambers of commerce of Italy, the Unioncamere, on June 7, 1901. He participated as a vice-president until 1912, when he resigned.
