= Roberto Sabatini =

Aerospace scientist

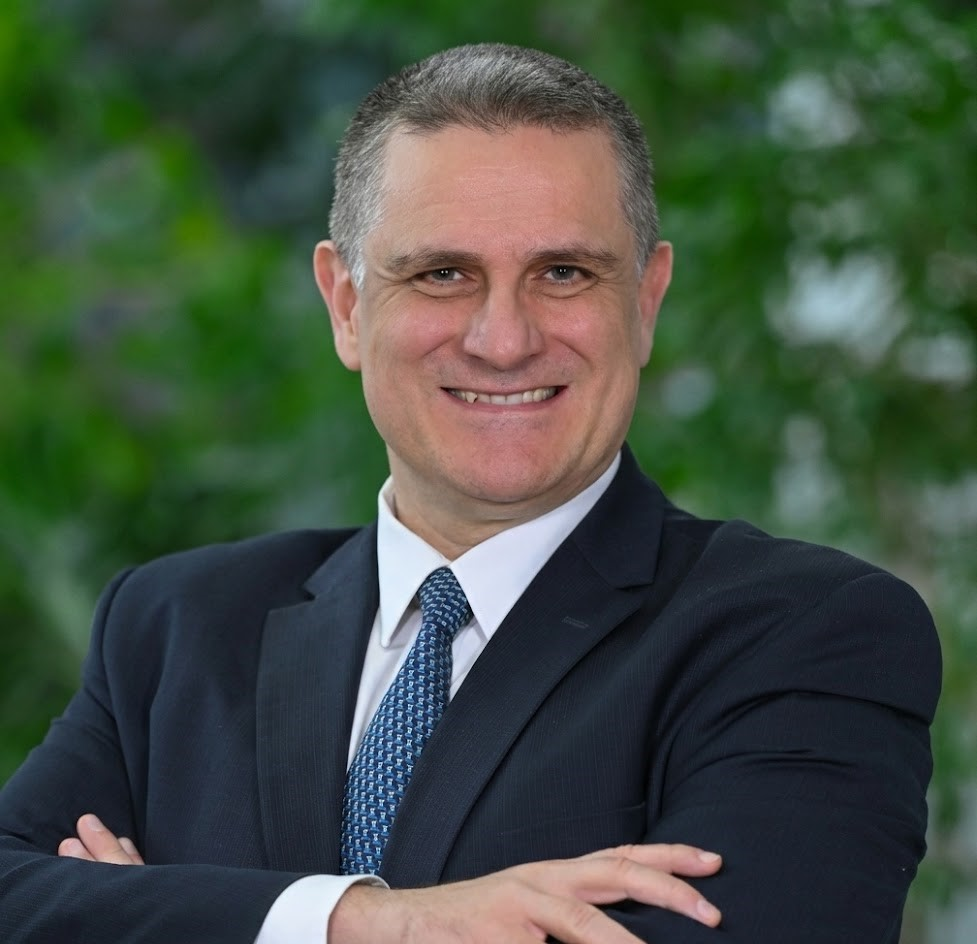
- Born: Rome, Italy
- Citizenship: Italian–Australian
- Education: Sapienza University of Rome (Laurea); Cranfield University (PhD); University of Nottingham (PhD, MSc); Quantic School of Business and Technology (Executive MBA)
- Known for: Digital avionics; ATM & UTM decision-support; autonomous flight systems; GNSS integrity
- Scientific career
- Fields: Aerospace engineering; Avionics; Autonomous systems; Navigation
- Workplaces: Italian Air Force; Cranfield University; RMIT University; Khalifa University

Roberto Sabatini is an Italian-Australian researcher, academic, and innovator specializing in aerospace, defense, and geospatial systems. He is a full professor at Khalifa University in the United Arab Emirates, and an honorary professor at RMIT University in Melbourne, Australia.

Since 2019, he has been listed among the top 2% most-cited researchers globally in Aerospace and Aeronautics, as reported by Stanford University and Elsevier.

== Education and early career ==
Sabatini's academic credentials include a Laurea in Astronautical Engineering from Sapienza University of Rome, PhDs in Aerospace Engineering (Cranfield University) and Space Geodesy and Surveying (University of Nottingham), an MSc in Navigation Technology, and an Executive MBA. He is also a licensed flight test engineer and pilot.

He joined the Italian Air Force Technical Corps in 1990 and graduated from the School of Air Warfare in 1993. He completed advanced training with the Royal Air Force and obtained the qualifications of Aerosystems Officer, Electronic Warfare Officer, and Weapon Employment Officer.

Sabatini served at the 14th Flight Inspection and Electronic Warfare Wing before joining the Italian Experimental Flight Regiment. From 2006 to 2008, he was Italian Platform Representative and European Logistic Manager for the US Joint Tactical Radio System Program and later served at the Directorate General for Aeronautical Armaments and Airworthiness.

== Academic career ==
Sabatini began his academic career at Cranfield University, where he led projects for the European Union’s Clean Sky programme and co-directed the Green Aircraft Trajectories under ATM Constraints project.

He later joined RMIT University in Melbourne as associate professor of aerospace engineering, becoming full professor in 2015. At RMIT, he was deputy director of the Sir Lawrence Wackett Defence and Aerospace Centre, chaired the Cyber-Physical Systems Research Group, and directed the Intelligent and Autonomous Aerospace Systems Laboratory.

In 2021, he became an honorary professor at RMIT and joined Khalifa University as professor and chair of the Aerospace Engineering Department. At Khalifa, he founded the Aerospace Systems Research Group and the Guidance, Navigation and Control Laboratory. Additionally, he launched the FALCON Innovation Program.

== Research ==
Sabatini’s research focuses on the design, testing, and certification of aerospace systems, highlighting the critical role of digital avionics and artificial intelligence in advancing sustainability and ensuring trusted autonomy. His work has addressed multi-sensor navigation and guidance, air traffic and unmanned aircraft traffic management decision support, autonomous separation assurance and collision avoidance, and airborne electro-optical testing and analysis. He has also contributed to research on Global Navigation Satellite System (GNSS) integrity monitoring and augmentation, distributed and intelligent satellite systems, Intelligent Health and Mission Management (IHMM), human–machine interaction, avionics for advanced air mobility, and sustainability in aviation and spaceflight.

He has authored more than 350 scholarly publications, including over 120 peer-reviewed journal articles, nine books, more than 40 book chapters, and numerous conference papers and technical reports. Sabatini has served on the editorial boards of journals such as Progress in Aerospace Sciences, IEEE Transactions on Aerospace and Electronic Systems, Aerospace Science and Technology, Journal of Intelligent and Robotic Systems, Robotica, and The Journal of Navigation. He is a founding co-editor of the IEEE Press Series on Aeronautics and Astronautics Systems.

== Industry and professional roles ==
Sabatini has contributed to NATO working groups, the US Joint Tactical Radio System Program, and European Space Agency initiatives. He has served in leadership roles with the IEEE Aerospace and Electronic Systems Society, the American Institute of Aeronautics and Astronautics, the Royal Aeronautical Society, and the International Council on Systems Engineering. In 2024, he became Vice President of Technical Operations for the IEEE Aerospace and Electronic Systems Society.

== Awards and honors ==
- Technology Innovation Award for Advanced Air Mobility, Aviation Business Middle East (2024)
- IEEE Aerospace and Electronic Systems Society Technical Panel of the Year (2022 and 2024)
- Distinguished Leadership Award, Aviation/Aerospace Australia (2021)
- Scientist of the Year, Australian Defence Industry Awards (2019)
- Professorial Scholarship Award, Northrop Grumman (2017)
- Science Award, Sustainable Aviation and Energy Research Society (2016)
- Arch T. Colwell Merit Award, SAE International (2015)
- Scientific Achievement Award, NATO Research & Technology Organization (2008)

Sabatini is a Fellow of the Institute of Electrical and Electronic Engineers (IEEE), Fellow of the Royal Aeronautical Society (RAeS), Fellow of the Royal Institute of Navigation (RIN), Fellow of the International Engineering and Technology Institute (IETI), as well as a Fellow and Executive Member of the Institution of Engineers Australia (IEAust).
