= Algebris =

British asset management company

Algebris (UK) Limited
- Type: Limited company
- Founded: London, United Kingdom (2006)
- Founders: Davide Serra and Eric Halet
- Headquarters: 11 Waterloo Place; London, SW1Y 4AU; United Kingdom
- Number of locations: 9: London, Milan, Rome, Zurich, Dublin, Boston, Singapore, Zurich 0and Tokyo
- Website: www.algebris.com

Algebris (UK) Limited is an asset management company which has historically specialized in the global financial sector. Founded in 2006, in October 2021 Algebris managed over $18 billion in assets under management. The company has offices in London, Milan, Rome, Dublin, Boston, Singapore, Zurich and Tokyo. Davide Serra, founder and CEO, owns the firm outright.

== History ==
Algebris was founded in 2006 by Davide Serra (from Genoa), a former analyst with Morgan Stanley and Eric Halet, a former fund manager with Wellington Management Company. The first fund, Algebris Global Financials Fund, was launched in October 2006. During the first year the fund grew from $700 million to around $2 billion managed. Historically, Algebris focused on bank shares and, shortly after 2008, started to seek value primarily in the tier-1 and 2 debt structures of global systemically important financial institutions. In November 2012, the Financial Times highlighted Algebris Financial CoCo Fund as one of the most profitable in London.

On the financial credit side, which in November 2017 counted for $7.4 billion of the firm’s assets under management, including bad loans at face value, the firm has earned 15 per cent annual net returns since it switched its emphasis to financial credit after the 2008 crisis.
Alongside subordinated debt and financial equity, the fund has extended into non-performing loans in 2014, a global macro strategy in 2016 investing also outside of financials.

In 2017 Algebris launched a fund focused on credit and equity securities of mostly midsized Italian companies. In February 2021, Algebris announced the launch of a team, led by Valerio Camerano, dedicated to investable solutions in the green transition. In October 2021 Algebris managed over $18 billion in assets under management. Algebris has posted a 9 percent compound annual return net of fees since 2006 on the $600 million it has invested on the equity side.

In January 2025, the company launched Algebris Climatech, a fund focused on investing in climate startups.

== Licenses ==
Algebris (UK) Limited is authorised and regulated by the Financial Conduct Authority and operates in Italy through its Milan branch. Algebris Investments (US) Inc is a SEC registered Investment Adviser. Algebris Investments (Asia) Pte. Ltd is a Licensed Fund Management Company with the MAS. Algebris Investments K.K.is licensed by Financial Services Agency. Algebris Investments S.à.r.l. is authorised and supervised by the CSSF.

== Sustainable development goals ==
Algebris became a UNPRI signatory on 23 July 2019.

In 2019 Algebris started a carbon off-setting project, aimed at achieving carbon neutrality across the group by planting 25,000 trees and committing to 20 trees per employee annually in Tanzania, in collaboration with Hakuna Matata, a registered UK charity founded by Serra. As of December 2021, Algebris had planted more than 82,000 trees.
