= Alberto Gallo (footballer) =

Italian footballer (born 1975)

Alberto Gallo (born 28 April 1975 in Padova) is an Italian retired footballer. He played as a striker. After playing for Padova youth teams, he made his debut in Serie A on 5 November 1995 against Roma. He then played for Monza in Serie C1 and Serie B, and after that again in Serie C1 with Ancona, Arezzo and Varese and in Serie C2 for Trento. He then went to play for the amateurs.

== Career ==
- 1994-1995 Padova 1 (0)
- 1995-1998 Monza 57 (3)
- 1998 Ancona 6 (0)
- 1998-1999 Atletico Catania 16 (2)
- 1999-2000 Arezzo 23 (3)
- 2000-2002 Varese 35 (5)
- 2002-2003 Trento 22 (1)
- 2003-2004 Città di Jesolo 28 (7)
- 2004-2005 Borgomanero 30 (3)
- 2005-2006 Palazzolo 23 (7)
- 2006-2007 Montecchio Maggiore 52 (18)
- 2007-2008 Castellana Castelgoffredo 5 (0)
- 2008-2009 Montecchio Maggiore 32 (9)
- 2009- Abano 29 (8)
