= SDA Bocconi School of Management =

Graduate business school in Milan, Italy

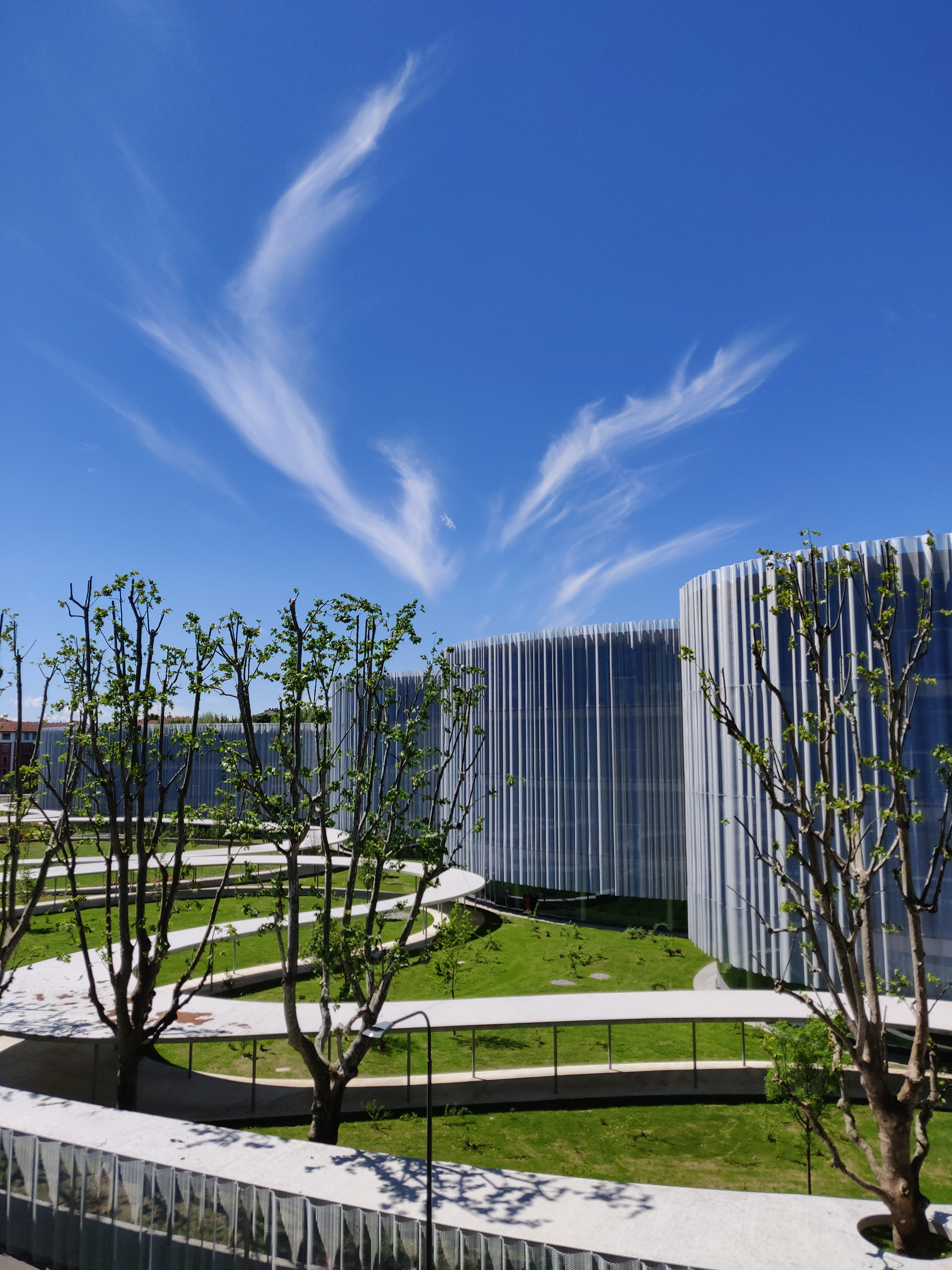
- School building
- Former name: Business School of Bocconi University
- Motto: Designed for your world
- Type: Private Business School
- Established: 1971
- Parent institution: Bocconi University
- Accreditation: Triple accreditation
- Dean: Stefano Caselli
- Location: Milan; Rome; Mumbai
- Website: www.sdabocconi.it/en/home
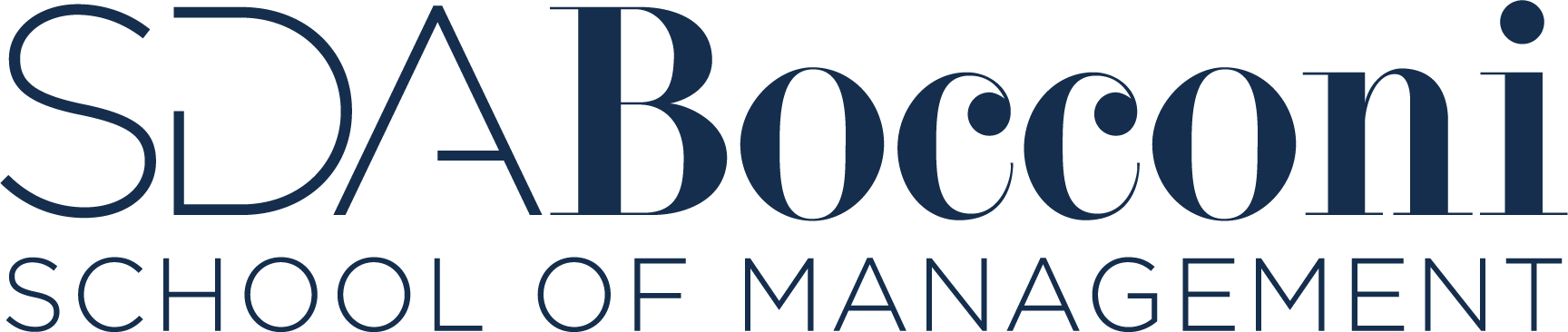

SDA Bocconi School of Management (Italian: Scuola di Direzione Aziendale, lit. 'Business School') was founded in 1971 and is the graduate business school of Bocconi University in Milan and Rome, Italy. It is triple accredited by the AACSB, EQUIS, and the AMBA. SDA Bocconi offers various MBA programs, specialized master's degrees, as well as executive education, professional development, and professional certification programs. The business school also regularly engages in commissioned research projects. SDA Bocconi School of Management, in addition to its main campus in Milan, Italy, maintains a presence in Mumbai, India, at the SDA Bocconi Asia Center.

== Accreditation and memberships ==
In 1998, SDA Bocconi was the first school in Italy to be accredited by EQUIS and is now one of only 100 business schools worldwide to hold the "triple crown", having been accredited by three international accreditation associations: AACSB, EQUIS and AMBA (Association of MBAs). The School has also been accredited by CSQNet and holds the ISO 9001:2000 quality rating from the Funded Projects Services Center.

SDA Bocconi is a member of the European Foundation for Management Development, AACSB International (Association to Advance Collegiate Schools of Business), EABIS (The Academy of Business in Society), ECGI (European Corporate Governance Institute), PIM (Partnership in International Management), CEMS (Community of European Management Schools and International Companies) – the last two alongside Bocconi University.

== Rankings ==
In the 2026–2027 Bloomberg Businessweek rankings, SDA Bocconi School of Management ranked 2nd in Europe.

In 2025, SDA Bocconi School of Management ranked 6th in Europe in the Financial Times European Business Schools Ranking.

In 2024, the Financial Times ranked SDA Bocconi's full-time MBA program 3rd in the world. In 2022, SDA Bocconi was ranked as the 4th best business school in Europe in the Financial Times' European Business School Ranking.

In 2023, QS ranked SDA Bocconi's MBA program as the 22nd best in the world

Bloomberg ranked SDA Bocconi as the #1 business school in Europe for the 2023–24 ranking cycle.

== Master in Business Administration (MBA) programs ==
SDA Bocconi offers three MBA programs:

- Full-Time MBA
- Global Executive MBA
- Executive MBA

=== Full-Time MBA ===
A 12-15-month full-time program in general management, taught in English. The course is designed for professionals with a few years’ industry experience. SDA Bocconi MBA structure is organized around three cornerstones: Planning and Innovation, Leading People and Processes and Controlling and Investment. These core courses represent the competence requirements of a global manager.

In addition to 4 functional-based Concentrations, such as Finance and Private Investment, Innovation and Entrepreneurship, Customer Experience Management and Digital Transformation and AI, the Program offers participants a sector-based track in Luxury Business Management. The last part of the MBA will take place in the Arrivederci Week: Arts and Business, Telecommunications and New media, Government-related finance, Pharmaceuticals and Health, and “Made in Italy” business models. As a major international school of management, SDA Bocconi is engaged in a network of exchanges, collaborations and interactions with peer institutions.

=== Global Executive MBA ===
A 18-month global executive program in general management that combines distance learning modules and class-based lessons in partnership with the Rotman School of Management. Taught in English, the Global Executive MBA includes 6 months at partner business schools abroad in Toronto, San Francisco, Copenhagen, Shanghai, São Paulo and Mumbai and offers the possibility to follow elective courses while abroad through partner organizations.

=== Executive MBA ===
A 18-month executive program in general management taught in either English and Italian or English. It can be taken in Weekend Format in either Milan or Rome or in Modular Format in Milan.

== Master's programs ==
=== Specialized master's ===
Specialized master's programs last one year and are taught in either English or Italian. In addition to class-based lessons, they include seminars, group projects, and field-based projects. The specialized Master's programs cover the following:

- Arts Management and Administration
- Corporate Finance
- Fashion, Experience and Design Management（Ranked 1st worldwide in the Eduniversal Best Masters Ranking in Fashion Management, which evaluated 40 master's programs in the field.）
- Imprenditorialità e Strategia Aziendale
- International Healthcare Management, Economics, and Policy
- International Master in Management, Law and Humanities of Sport
- Management per la Sanità
- Public Management
- Sustainability Management

=== Executive master's ===
Executive master's programs combine class-based lessons with distance learning. The courses are taught in English and cover the following:

- Business of Events
- Finance
- Luxury Management
- Management delle Amministrazioni Pubbliche
- Management delle Aziende Sanitarie e Socio-Assistenziali
- Management of International Organizations
- Marketing and Sales (in partnership with ESADE Business School)

== Doctorate program ==
=== Doctorate in Business Administration (DBA) ===
SDA Bocconi offers the DBA degree, a 3-year part-time program designed for business professionals seeking to become thought leaders in their organizations by applying academic research to real-world managerial problems.

== Executive open programs and custom projects ==
Open programs and professional certifications are aimed at managers with different degrees of experience and responsibility working in one of the following fields: large corporations, banks, insurance and financial intermediaries, fashion and design, healthcare, non-profit organizations, small and medium-size businesses, public administration, real estate, sport and tourism. As well as being sector-specific, the programs are designed based on different job functions: administration and control, corporate finance, marketing, sales, communication and distribution, organization, human resources, risk management, information systems, strategy and entrepreneurship, technology and operations. There are also more generic programs covering areas such as general management, project management, quantitative methods and leadership. Class-based lessons are combined with individual assessments, study tours, distance learning, role playing, experiential learning, web-based simulations, field visits, company visits, tutoring and coaching.

In addition to the 200 Executive Open Programs aimed at Italian professionals, the school has designed a number of International Executive Open Programs on subjects such as finance, retail management, marketing and communication. Some of these have been developed in collaboration with institutions, sponsors and international trade associations.

To address the specific needs of companies and organizations, the school has developed what they call the Modello di Corporate Empowerment (i.e. Corporate Empowerment Model), designed especially to create custom programs that are able to strengthen and value organizations. These programs are run by three divisions, each dedicated to one of the School's main target sectors. The divisions are: DIM (Divisione Imprese), for businesses, DIBA (Divisione Banche, Assicurazioni e Intermediari Finanziari), for banks, insurance companies and financial intermediaries, and DAP (Divisione Amministrazioni Pubbliche, Sanità e non profit), for public administration, healthcare and non-profit organizations.

== Research ==
The Research Division, founded 22 years ago by Claudio Demattè, uses the outcomes of the latest studies to address the needs of managers working in companies and in financial and public institutions. Research projects can take one of the following shapes:

- Custom research projects
- Academic research projects
- Labs

== Alumni Association ==
Alumni from SDA Bocconi and the other Bocconi schools are all members of the Bocconi Alumni Association. As of September 2015, the Alumni Association is composed of over 95,000 active alumni, 12,000 of which are from SDA Bocconi. The Bocconi alumni network is active in over 110 countries in the world.
