= Bocconi University =

Private university in Milan, Italy

- Università Commerciale Luigi Bocconi
- Seal
- Motto: Knowledge That Matters
- Type: Private
- Established: 10 November 1902; 124 years ago
- Affiliations: CIVICA, AACSB, EQUIS, AMBA, CEMS, CFA, ASFOR, EAPAA
- President: Andrea Sironi
- Rector: Francesco Billari
- Students: 15,427 (as of 2024)
- Location: Milan, Italy; 45°27′1″N 9°11′23″E
- Campus: Urban
- Website: www.unibocconi.it/en

Bocconi University or Università Bocconi (formally known in Italian as Università Commerciale Luigi Bocconi [universiˈta kommerˈtʃaːle luˈiːdʒi bokˈkoːni] – or simply Bocconi) is a non-profit private university located in Milan, Italy.

The university offers courses in social sciences, with programs in economics, management, finance, law, political science, data and computer science, and an increasing focus on artificial intelligence.

Bocconi is a founding member of CEMS – The Global Alliance in Management Education. Through its graduate business school, the SDA Bocconi School of Management, the university holds triple accreditation from AACSB, EQUIS, and AMBA. SDA Bocconi offers MBA, Executive MBA, DBA, executive education, professional development, and certification programs.

== History ==
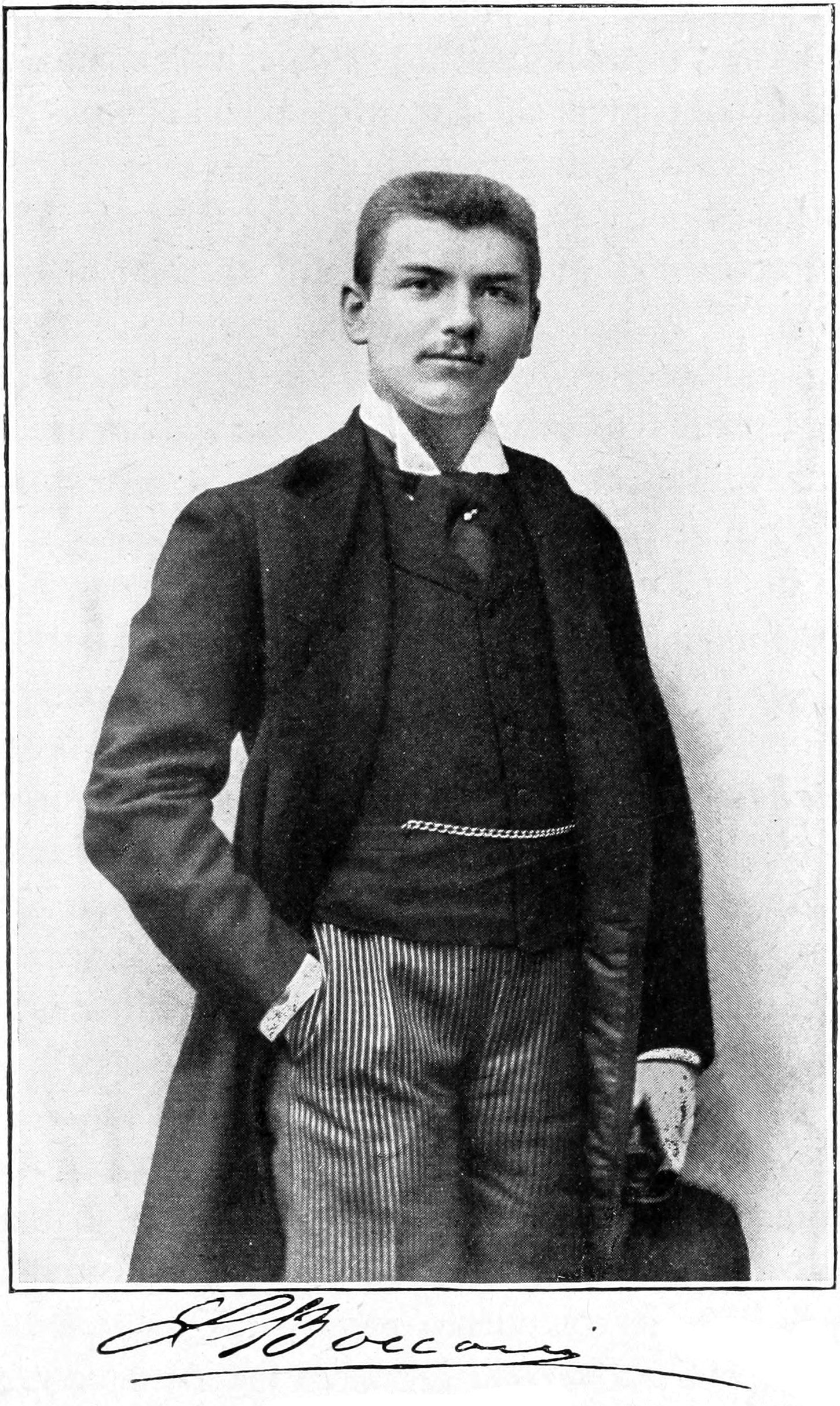
Luigi Bocconi

Bocconi University was established in 1902 as Italy's first university to offer a degree in economics.

Its founder, Ferdinando Bocconi, created the university in memory of his son Luigi, who died in the 1896 Battle of Adwa during the First Italo-Ethiopian War. The university was initially conceived to complement the Polytechnic University of Milan's engineering school with the aim of integrating technical expertise and economic knowledge, thereby training professionals equipped to meet emerging industrial and commercial needs, and adopted a teaching model based on methods used at the École Supérieure of Antwerp.

The university's first building opened in Largo Notari (today Via Statuto). In 1941, Bocconi moved to its current main campus in Via Sarfatti 25. Over the decades, the campus has expanded with new facilities, including student residences, research centers, and the business school SDA Bocconi School of Management (established in 1971).

Key milestones include the introduction of new degree programs in law, political science, data science and artificial intelligence, the launch of Italy's first MBA (1974), the creation of the CEMS alliance (1988), and the completion of the new urban campus designed by SANAA in 2019.

== Campus ==
The university's first building opened in 1902 on Via Statuto, near the Pinacoteca di Brera. Today, the campus is located beside Parco Ravizza, between Via Sarfatti and Viale Bligny, and comprises multiple buildings near Porta Ticinese and the Basilica of Sant'Eustorgio:

- Sarfatti Building (1941), designed by Giuseppe Pagano, is the oldest building on campus. It houses classrooms, the aula magna, administrative offices, and a restaurant. Its entrance is flanked by two lion statues, which have become the subject of university myths.
- Pensionato Building (1956), by Giovanni Muzio, contains dormitories (350 rooms), a canteen, large halls, and faculty offices. Its floors are shaped like a symmetrical "L", said to represent laude.
- SDA Bocconi Building (2019) houses the new headquarters of the SDA Bocconi School of Management and is located on the site previously occupied by the Centrale del Latte. Designed by the Tokyo-based SANAA studio, the area also includes the Castiglioni Residence and the sports center.
- Leonardo del Vecchio Building (Velodromo) (2001), designed by Ignazio Gardella, is ellipsoid in shape and contains classrooms for up to 150 students each. It features a geothermal heat pump system. A statue of Ferdinando Bocconi stands in the foyer.
- Library Building (1962), also by Giovanni Muzio, stands in Piazza Sraffa alongside the campus chapel (San Ferdinando) and other smaller facilities.
- Röntgen Building (2007), designed by Grafton Architects, won World Building of the Year at the 2008 World Architecture Festival in Barcelona. It houses the university's departments and research centers, as well as a new aula magna, seminar rooms, and exhibition areas. Its designers, Yvonne Farrell and Shelley McNamara, received the 2020 Pritzker Architecture Prize.

Several other administrative and research offices are located near Parco Ravizza and Viale Isonzo.

=== Dormitories ===
Bocconi provides approximately 1,800 dormitory places for students. Residences include Bocconi, Javotte, Dubini, Spadolini, Isonzo, Bligny, and Castiglioni (opened in 2018).

Full view on the ellipsoid Velodromo building, as seen from EGEA

Entrance to the Velodromo and new building in background

The Dubini Residence (Residenza E. Dubini) of Bocconi University

== Academics ==
Bocconi is organized into five schools:

- Undergraduate School
- Graduate School
- School of Law
- PhD School
- SDA Bocconi School of Management.

The academic structure includes nine departments:

- Accounting
- Computing Sciences
- Economics
- Finance
- Management and Technology
- Marketing
- Decision Sciences
- Social and Political Sciences
- Legal Studies.

Research activities are carried out within departments, research centers, and laboratories.

=== Undergraduate School ===
The Bocconi Undergraduate School offers eight Bachelor of Science programs in English and/or Italian:

- Economics
- Finance
- International Politics and Government (double degree with HEC Paris)
- Management (double degree with Peking University)
- Management and Computer Science
- Management for the Arts and Cultures
- Mathematical and Computing Sciences for Artificial Intelligence
- World Bachelor in Business (triple degree with USC Marshall School of Business and Hong Kong University of Science and Technology)

=== Graduate School ===
The Bocconi Graduate School offers 14 Master of Science (MSc) programs taught in English, 1 specialized master in English, and 1 in Italian. Bocconi's MSc in Finance was among the first six programs worldwide to partner with the CFA Institute and the first in continental Europe. Its MSc in Management and International Management includes participation in the CEMS Master in International Management, of which Bocconi is a founding member.

MSc programs include Accounting and Financial Management; Artificial Intelligence; Cyber Risk Strategy and Governance; Data Analytics and Artificial Intelligence in Health Sciences; Data Science and Business Analytics; Economic and Social Sciences; Economics and Management in Arts, Culture, Media and Entertainment; Economics and Management of Government and International Organizations; Finance; Innovation, Technology and Entrepreneurship; International Management; Marketing Management; Politics and Policy Analysis; and Transformative Sustainability.

Specialized masters include Marketing e Comunicazione (MiMeC); and Quantitative Finance and Risk Management (MAFINRISK).

Double degree programs exist with CEMS partner universities, and with many universities from all over the world such as ESSEC Business School, Fudan University, and Sciences Po, London School of Economics, HEC Paris, ESADE.

=== School of Law ===
Established in 2006, the Bocconi School of Law consolidated the university's tradition in legal studies under the "A. Sraffa" Institute for Comparative Law. It offers law courses in Italian and English and a summer academy (with the University of Trento and Sant'Anna School of Advanced Studies).

Programs include:

- Giurisprudenza
- Bachelor in Global Law (BGL)
- Master of Arts in Global Law for Organizations, Business Enterprises and Institutions (GLOBE)

Specialized master's include LLM in European Business and Social Law; LLM in Global Tax and Law Governance; and LLM in Law of Technology and Automated Systems.

The School of Law also offers a number of double degree programs and exchange programs with 290 partner institutions worldwide.

=== PhD School ===
The Bocconi PhD School offers doctoral programs in:

- Economics and Finance (4 years)
- Business Administration and Management (4 years)
- Statistics and Computer Science (4 years)
- Social and Political Science (4 years)
- Mathematics and Applications (4 years)
- Legal Studies (3 years)

=== SDA Bocconi ===
The new SDA Bocconi campus in Milan

Founded in 1971, SDA Bocconi is the university's graduate business school, with locations also in Rome and Mumbai, and offers MBA, Executive MBA, specialized master's, and executive education. It holds triple accreditation (AACSB, EQUIS, AMBA) and publishes Economia & Management, an Italian management review. The school also offers specialized Master programs in areas such as corporate finance, real estate management, food and beverage, fashion, design, and sports management.

== Research and endowment ==
In 2006, Bocconi's research funding came primarily from the university itself (€1.5 million), the European Union (€1.4 million), the Italian Ministry of Education, University and Research (€300,000), and external sources (€11 million). In 2011, the European Research Council awarded €5 million to five social sciences and humanities projects led by Bocconi professors. Bocconi has been a major recipient of European Research Council (ERC) funding since the program's inception, securing 71 grants across all ERC schemes, particularly in the social sciences and quantitative disciplines, with approximately 35 grants active in 2025.

=== Departments ===
Bocconi has departments in Accounting, Economics, Finance, Management and Technology, Marketing, Decision Sciences, Legal Studies, Social and Political Sciences, and Computing Sciences.

Permanent research centers include the Paolo Baffi Centre (economics, finance and regulation), BIDSA (data science and analytics), CERGAS (health and social care management), Dondena Centre (social dynamics and public policy), GREEN (energy and environment), ICRIOS (innovation and strategy), IGIER (economic research, jointly with NBER and CEPR).

== International rankings ==
Institute	Subject	2025	2024	2023	2022	2021	2020	2019	2018	2017	2016
QS World University Rankings	Social Sciences and Management	12th	16th	16th	10th	10th	16th	16th	11th	17th	22nd
QS World University Rankings	Social Policy and Administration	46th	38th								
QS World University Rankings	Arts and Humanities	451st-500th	401st-450th								
QS World University Rankings	Law and Legal Studies	=71st	=57th								
QS World University Rankings	Politics	71st	51st-100th								
QS World University Rankings	Marketing	7th	7th	8th							
QS World University Rankings	Hospitality and Leisure Management	51st-100th	51st-100th								
QS World University Rankings	Statistics and Operational Research	101st-150th	51st-100th								
QS World University Rankings	Development Studies	101st-150th									
QS World University Rankings	Computer Science and Information Systems	301st-350th	351st-400th	401st-450th		351st-400th					
QS World University Rankings	Mathematics	451-500th	401st-450th								
QS World University Rankings	Finance Masters		11th	10th	10th		10th	11th	8th		
QS World University Rankings	Management Masters		13th	11th			9th	11th	11th		
QS World University Rankings	Accounting & Finance	19th	17th	17th		16th	17th	18th	29th	33rd	27th
QS World University Rankings	Business & Management Studies	10th	9th	7th	6th	7th	7th	8th	10th	11th	10th
QS World University Rankings	Economics & Econometrics	17th	16th	16th	16th	18th	16th	16th	16th	16th	17th
QS World University Rankings	Global MBA		20th	22nd			23rd	10th	22nd		
QS World University Rankings	Global EMBA							16th	19th		
Financial Times	Global MBA	4th	3rd	6th		13th	12th	31st	29th	22nd	25th
Financial Times	European Business Schools		6th	5th							
Financial Times	Executive Education (customized)	3rd	5th	9th				4th	7th	4th	6th
Financial Times	Executive Education (open)	12th	9th	14th				23rd	28th	33rd	39th
Financial Times	Master in Finance (pre-experience)	19th	18th	13th					8th	7th	9th
Financial Times	Master in Management	13th	11th	8th				10th	6th	10th	11th
Bloomberg	European B-Schools ranking	1st	3rd	1st	5th	3rd	5th	5th			
ARWU	Economics		32nd	32nd				27th	31st	40th	
ARWU	Finance		47th	51–75				34th	36th	50th	
ARWU	Management		29th	25th				30th	34th	41st	
Times Higher Education	Business and Economics								27th		
US News	Best Global Universities for Economics and Business							24th	27th		
Forbes	The Best International MBAs: One-Year Programs						4th			5th	
The Economist	MBA						6th	13th	24th	28th	38th

== Student life ==
Bocconi offers students a variety of cultural and extracurricular initiatives, including:

- Student Media Center, which includes Radio Bocconi, Bocconi TV, and the student newspaper Tra i Leoni
- Bocconi Sport, with facilities such as the Bocconi Sport Center and teams in football, basketball, volleyball, tennis, swimming, athletics, and more
- Bocconi Art Gallery (BAG), a contemporary art project on campus
- More than 100 student associations

=== Student publications ===
Student-run publications include:

- Tra i Leoni, a campus magazine
- Bocconi School of Law Student-Edited Papers, the official law journal

== Notable people ==
.

=== Alumni ===
- Alberto Alemanno, global clinical professor of law at New York University (NYU)
- Alberto Alesina, former Nathaniel Ropes Professor of Political Economy at Harvard University
- Franco Amatori, professor of Economic History at Bocconi University and past president of the European Business History Association
- Salvatore Aranzulla, blogger and entrepreneur
- Mario Arcelli, economist, minister for the Budget in the Italian government
- Giovanni Arrighi, professor of sociology at Johns Hopkins University
- Jörg Asmussen, member of the executive board of the European Central Bank
- Oriana Bandiera, Sir Anthony Atkinson Professor of Economics at the London School of Economics
- Francesco Billari, demographer and sociologist, rector of Bocconi University
- Mario Biondi, novelist, travel writer, poet
- Alessandro Magnoli Bocchi, economist
- Tito Boeri, professor of labour economics at Bocconi University, columnist for La Repubblica and former president of INPS (National Institute for Social Security in Italy)
- Emma Bonino, former Italian minister of Foreign Affairs (2013–14)
- Paolo Brera, journalist, author, and former assistant professor of political economy at Bocconi University
- Marco Cappato, Italian politician and member of the European Parliament
- Vittorio Colao, former CEO of Vodafone Group and the Italian minister for Technological Innovation in the government of Prime Minister Mario Draghi
- Francesca Cornelli, dean of Northwestern University's Kellogg School of Management, former professor of finance and deputy dean at London Business School
- Luigi Corradi, engineer and CEO of Trenitalia
- Claudio Costamagna, chairman of Advanced Accelerator Applications
- Fabio De'Longhi, CEO of De'Longhi
- Teresa de Lauretis, writer and professor at the University of California, Santa Cruz
- Luca de Meo, CEO of Kering, former CEO of Renault and former president of SEAT
- Luigi Einaudi, president of the Italian Republic (1948–1955) and governor of Bank of Italy
- Andrea Enria, chair of the ECB Supervisory Board (2019–present), and former chair of the European Banking Authority (2011–19)
- Francesco Giavazzi, economist and Bocconi University professor
- Vittorio Grilli, Italian minister of Economy and Finance (2012–13) and former professor at Yale University
- Fiorella Kostoris, professor at the Sapienza University of Rome and College of Europe
- Domenico Lombardi, president of the Oxford Institute for Economic Policy, and a senior fellow at the Brookings Institution
- Valerio Massimo Manfredi, journalist, television host, historical novelist
- Federico Marchetti, CEO and founder of YOOX Net-a-Porter Group
- Antonio Merlo, sixteenth president of Drexel University, former George A. Peterkin Professor of Economics and dean at Rice University
- Francesco Milleri, CEO of Luxottica
- Eduardo Missoni, secretary general of the World Organization of the Scout Movement
- Mario Monti, former Italian prime minister (2011–2013)
- Dubravka Negre, minister of Mining and Energy of Serbia since 2022
- Sergio Noja Noseda, professor of Islamic law, Arabic Language and Literature, author of multiple books on Islamic culture
- Tommaso Padoa-Schioppa, economist and former Italian minister of Economy and Finance (2006–08)
- Alessandro Pansa, former CEO of Leonardo
- Corrado Passera, former Italian minister of Enterprises and Made in Italy, Infrastructure and Transport (2011–13)
- Marco Patuano, CEO of TIM Group
- Barbara Pollastrini, former Italian minister for Equal Opportunities in the Prodi II cabinet (2006)
- Alessandro Profumo, banker
- Marco Tronchetti Provera, manager
- Massimo Renon, CEO of the Benetton Group since 2020
- Sebastian Rocca, social entrepreneur, coach, and LGBTQI rights activist
- Luigi Roth, CEO of Breda Railway Construction (1993–2001)
- Nouriel Roubini, NYU Stern School of Business professor emeritus
- Leopoldo Sabbatini, first dean of Bocconi University, vice president of the Milan Chamber of Commerce
- Fabrizio Saccomanni, minister of Economy and Finance of the Italian government and former general manager of the Bank of Italy
- Paolo Scaroni, chair of AC Milan and Enel
- Nina Seničar, Serbian model
- Renato Soru, billionaire entrepreneur and manager, founder of the internet service company Tiscali
- Guido Tabellini, former rector of Bocconi University (2008–2012) and columnist for Il Sole 24 Ore
- Patrizia Toia, Italian politician and member of the European Parliament
- Sara Tommasi, actress
- Benedetto Della Vedova, politician
- Roberto Vedovotto, CEO of Kering Eyewear since 2014
- Gino Zaccaria, philosopher, Bocconi senior professor of philosophy
- Luigi Zingales, University of Chicago Booth School of Business professor

=== Other ===
- Andrea Agnelli, businessman and chairman of Juventus FC
- Prince Aimone of Savoy, Duke of Apulia, claimant for the headship of the House of Savoy
- Beatrice Borromeo, noblewoman of the House of Borromeo, journalist and ex-model
- Pierre Casiraghi, seventh in line to the throne of Monaco, son of Caroline, Princess of Hanover, and nephew of Albert II, Prince of Monaco
- Chiara Ferragni, fashion blogger and businesswoman, has not obtained degree
- Giovanni Cobolli Gigli, former chairman of Juventus FC
- Steven Goldstein, race car driver
- Vittorio Gallinari, basketball player
- Clarence Seedorf, Dutch football player
- Carla Sozzani, gallerist known for creating the 10 Corso Como complex

=== Alumnus of the Year ===
Since 2011, Bocconi's Alumni Association has awarded Alumnus of the Year to graduates exemplifying the values of professionalism, entrepreneurship, integrity, responsibility, and openness. It replaced the Bocconian of the Year (since 1988) and Master of Masters (since 2007). Past recipients include Fabrizio Saccomanni, Emma Bonino, Vittorio Colao, Nouriel Roubini, Luca de Meo, Francesca Bellettini, and Giuseppe Sala.

== See also ==
- University of Milan
- Polytechnic University of Milan
