= Treaty of San Ildefonso =

Treaty of San Ildefonso may refer to:

- First Treaty of San Ildefonso of 1777 between Spain and Portugal
- Second Treaty of San Ildefonso of 1796 between Spain and France, allying the two nations
- Third Treaty of San Ildefonso of 1800 between Spain and France, by which Spain returned Louisiana to France

== See also ==
- San Ildefonso, a town in central Spain
- Royal Palace of La Granja de San Ildefonso, the summer residence of the Kings of Spain
