= The Christ Child and the Infant John the Baptist with a Shell =

Painting by Bartolomé Esteban Murillo

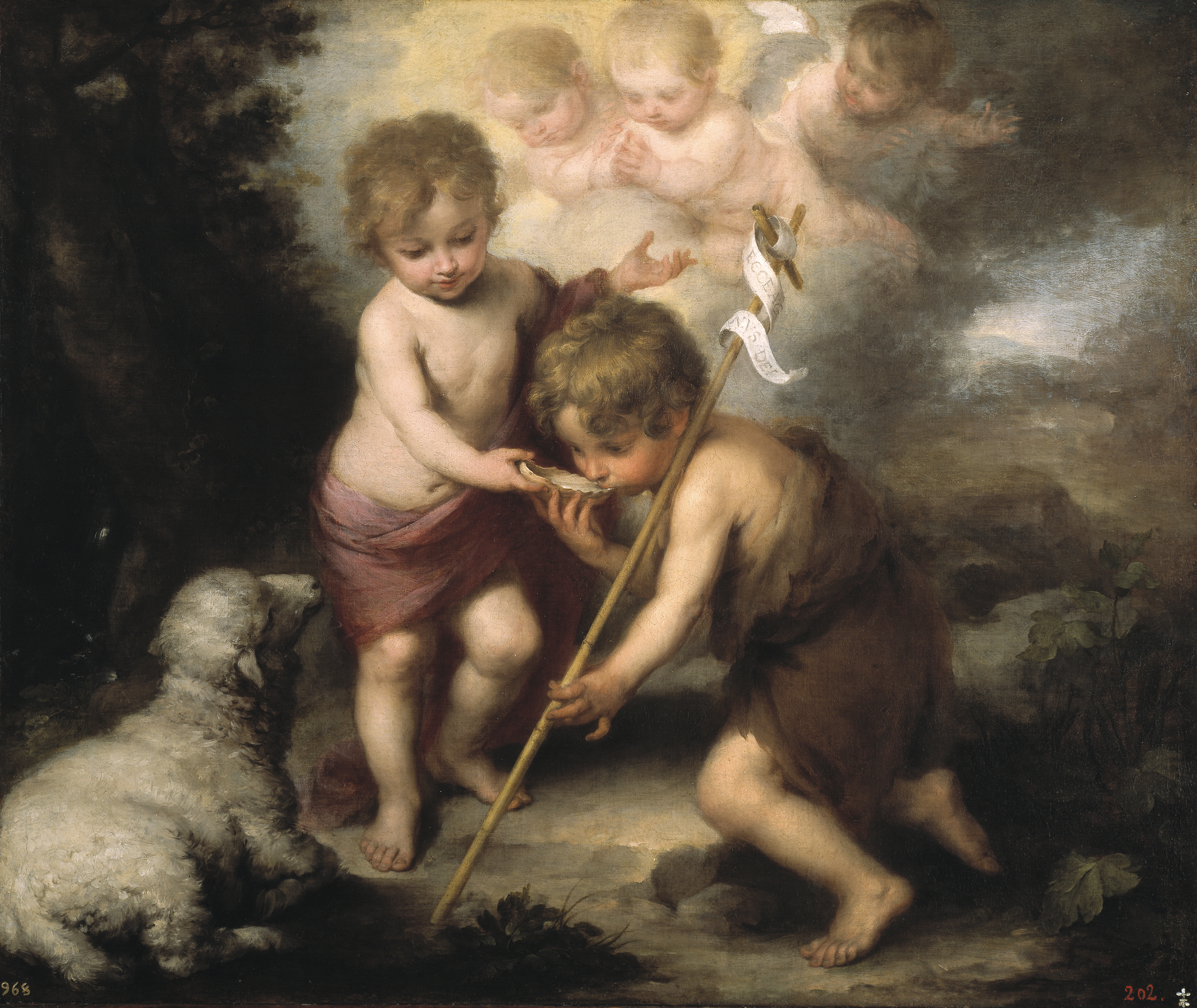

The Christ Child and the Infant John the Baptist with a Shell or The Holy Children with a Shell (Spanish - Los Niños de la concha) is a 1670-1675 oil on canvas painting by Bartolomé Esteban Murillo, now in the Prado Museum in Madrid.

One of the artist's most popular works, it was widely reproduced in prints and on plates. It first appeared in the written record in 1746, when it was recorded in Elisabeth Farnese's collection in the Royal Palace of La Granja de San Ildefonso in Segovia, moving to infante Luis's bedroom in the same palace by 1766. It was next recorded in the kings' bedroom in the Palacio de Aranjuez in Madrid in 1794, then the Palacio Real in Madrid from 1814 to 1818.
