= Teodoro Ardemans =

Spanish painter

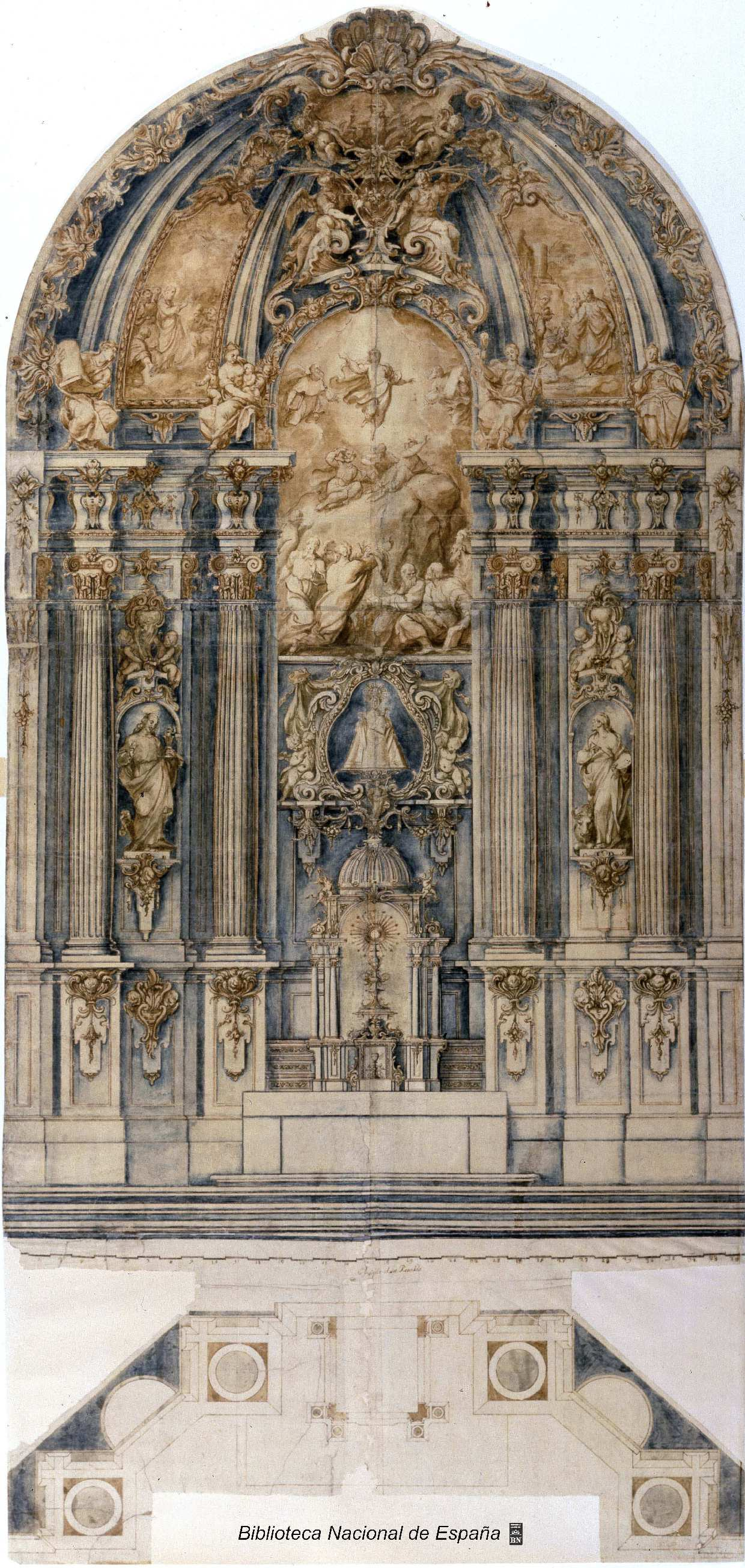
- Project by Teodoro de Ardemans for a retablo in the Convent of Santa Teresa, Madrid
- Born: 1664; Madrid, Spain
- Died: 15 February 1726 (aged 61–62); Madrid, Spain
- Education: Claudio Coello
- Known for: Architecture; Painting
- Movement: Baroque

Teodoro de Ardemans or Ardmans (1664 – February 15, 1726) was a Spanish architect and painter known for his significant contributions to Spanish Baroque architecture and painting in the early 18th century, including his work on the Royal Palace of Aranjuez and the Royal Palace of La Granja de San Ildefonso.

== Life and works ==
Ardemans was born in Madrid to a German father. He began his training as a painter in the studio of Antonio de Pereda. Upon the latter's death, when Ardemans was sixteen, he entered the studio of Claudio Coello. He also studied mathematics at the Colegio Imperial de Madrid.

=== Architecture ===
He worked in Granada (1689–91) as chief architect of the cathedral, also advising on civil and engineering works. He returned to Madrid in 1691 as deputy municipal architect, becoming municipal architect in 1700. The doorways and towers of the Casa de la Villa, the Ayuntamiento in Madrid, remodelled by him c. 1690, are a good example of his bold manner and cosmopolitan taste. The doorways are Italianate and the heraldic pedestals are reminiscent of the style of John Vanbrugh in England. The capitals of the Ayuntamiento in Toledo (1693) were built following a design of Ardemans, who was in charge of the cathedral works in that city from 1694.

=== La Granja de San Ildefonso ===
In 1702, King Philip V of Spain named him to succeed José del Olmo as the master for Royal works, and in 1704 as their chamber painter. From 1719 Ardemans was involved in the first great building of the Spanish Bourbon dynasty, the palace of La Granja in San Ildefonso, near Segovia, built on the site of a farm and Hieronymite monastery founded in 1477 and acquired by Philip V in 1718. Ardemans was required to design a palace and chapel using the 16th-century cloister as a nucleus. Work started in April 1721 and both palace and chapel were ready for benediction and consecration in 1723. Ardemans designed a very simple Alcázar-type palace. Square in plan and set around a central courtyard, the Patio de la Fuente, it has four towers at the corners. The Baroque capitals of the towers are still visible despite the recasing (1735–9) of the whole structure by Filippo Juvarra and Giovanni Battista Sacchetti.

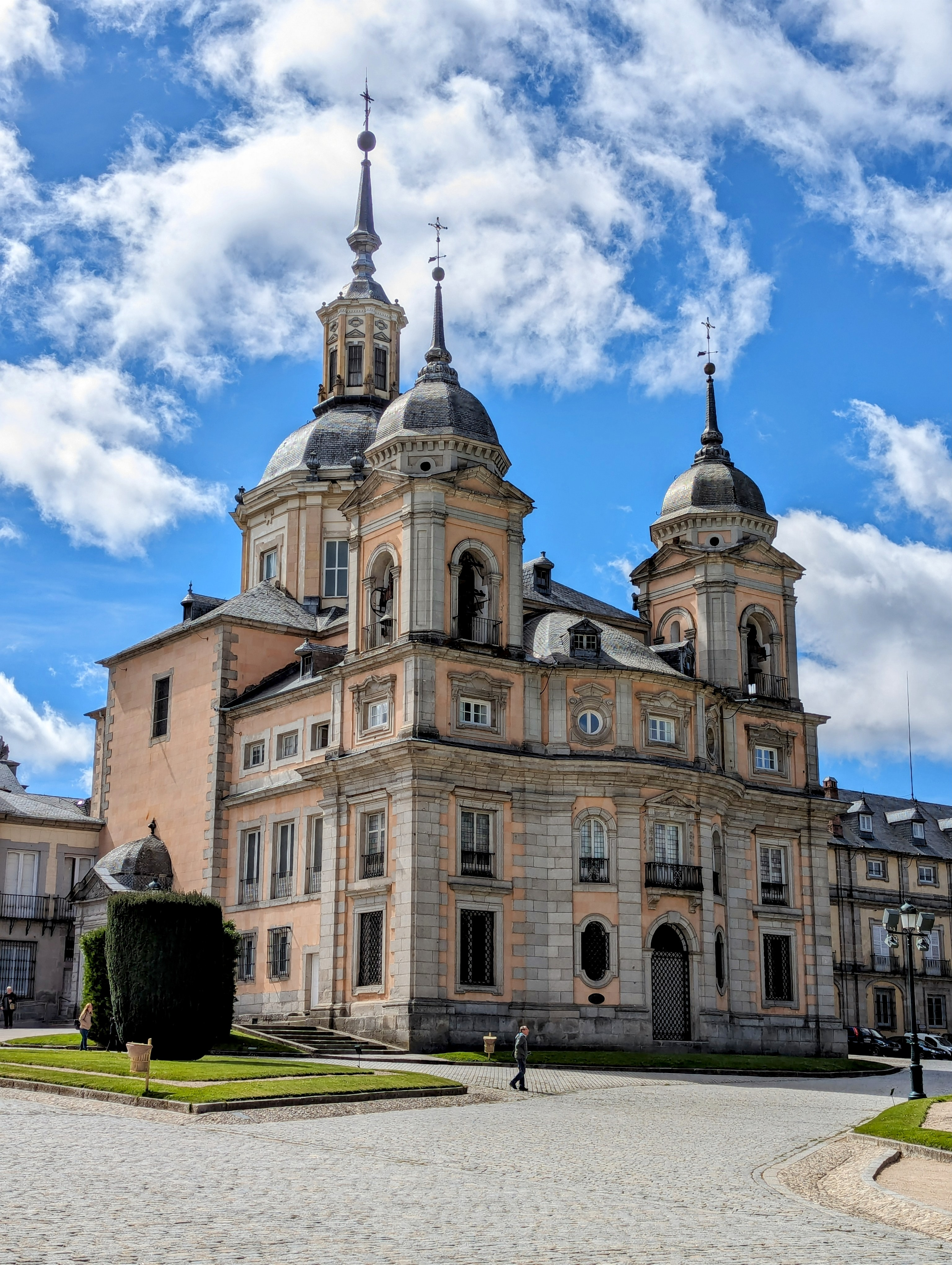
Real Colegiata de la Santísima Trinidad, San Ildefonso

The palace chapel, the Colegiata, elevated to collegiate church status in 1723, is in a Latin cross plan crowned by a dome. Modelled on the parish church of Alpagés, Aranjuez (1681–1705), it follows the traditional style of Baroque churches in Madrid and is set at an axis to the palace façade, its dome rising above the palace towers to form a picturesque grouping. In its original form, Ardemans’s design recalled the Escorial, which offered a similar view of a church flanked by the palace towers. Like the palace, the chapel was subsequently given a grander appearance (1727–34 and 1736–80). For the chapel he also designed the high altar dedicated to San Ildefonso, an elaborate construction in bronze and such rich materials as jasper, which was unfinished at his death. Ardemans’s interest in urban planning and engineering is reflected in his two treatises, Ordenanzas de Madrid y otras diferentes que se practican en las ciudades de Toledo y Sevilla (Madrid, 1720) and Fluencias de la tierra y curso subterráneo de las aguas (Madrid, 1724). Ardmans died in Madrid on February 15, 1726 and was buried in the Convent de San Antonio del Prado.

== Bibliography ==
- Noticias de los arquitectos y arquitectura de España desde su restauración. Eugenio Llaguno y Amirola y Juan Agustín Ceán Bermúdez, Madrid 1829. digital version
- Aterido Fernández, Ángel, Teodoro Ardemans, pintor, Anuario del Departamento de Historia y Teoría del Arte, (UAM), vol. VII-VIII, 1995–1996, p. 133-148.
