= René Frémin =

French sculptor (1672–1744)

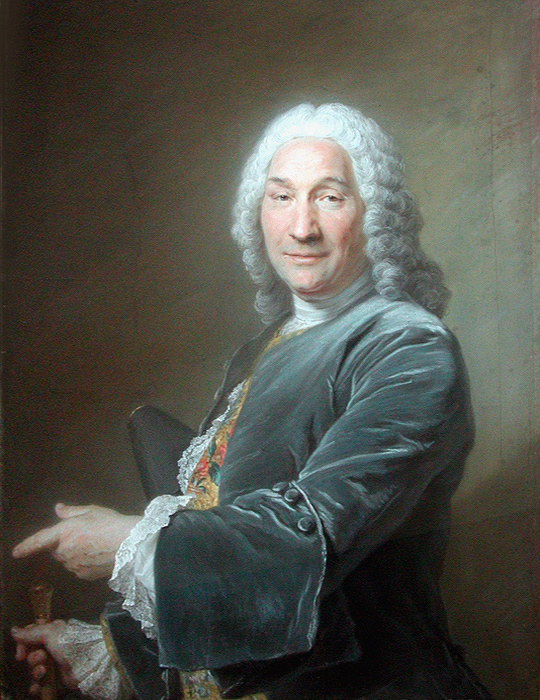
- Portrait of Frémin from 1743 by Académie member Maurice-Quentin de La Tour
- Born: 1 October 1672; Paris, Kingdom of France
- Died: 17 February 1744 (aged 71); Paris, Kingdom of France
- Education: François Girardon, Antoine Coysevox
- Known for: Sculpture
- Awards: Prix de Rome (1694)
- Patrons: Philip V

Director of the Académie de Peinture et de Sculpture
- In office 1742–1744
- Monarch: Louis XV
- Preceded by: Nicolas de Largillière
- Succeeded by: Pierre-Jacques Cazes

René Frémin (1 October 1672 – 17 February 1744) was a French sculptor.

== Biography ==
Frémin was born on 1 October 1672 in Paris to Jean Frémin, a goldsmith, and Marguerite Tartarin, niece of the painter Charles de La Fosse. He was a student of the French sculptors François Girardon and Antoine Coysevox. Frémin won the Prix de Rome for sculpture in 1694 and spent the next several years at the French Academy in Rome. While there, he contributed two Baroque bronze reliefs to the sculptural ensemble of the altar of Saint Ignatius in the Church of the Gesù.

Frémin returned to Paris near the end of 1699 and was shortly thereafter admitted to the Académie royale de peinture et de sculpture as an academician upon his presentation of the marble relief Time Unveiling Truth. He produced sculptures for the park of Rambouillet and the Hall of Mirrors at the Palace of Versailles. Frémin was also responsible for the decoration of the façade of the building housing La Samaritaine department store on the Pont Neuf in Paris.

Frémin married Suzanne Cartaud, daughter of the architect Sylvain Cartaud, on 22 November 1707. They had two sons together, Jean Sylvain and Claude-René, both of whom were eventually employed by the French Crown.

He departed France in 1721 in response to an invitation from King Philip V of Spain to work on the sculptural decoration at the park of the Royal Palace of La Granja de San Ildefonso. His work there was considerable, but he returned to France in 1738 after accumulating a large fortune.

Frémin was elected director of the Académie Royale in 1742. Frémin died in the Louvre Palace on 17 February 1744.

== Selected works ==
- Lot and his Daughters leaving the Town of Sodom (1694) – a now-lost sculpture that earned Frémin the Prix de Rome
- Time Unveiling Truth (1700-1701) – Frémin's reception piece for the Académie Royale, now in fragments at the Beaux-Arts de Paris.
- Hercules Abducting Deianera (1704) – Exhibited at the Salon of 1704, now in the park of Château de Chantilly
- Flora (1706-1709) – The Louvre, Paris
- Companion of Diana (1710-1717) – The Louvre, Paris

== Gallery (partial) ==
Works by René Frémin

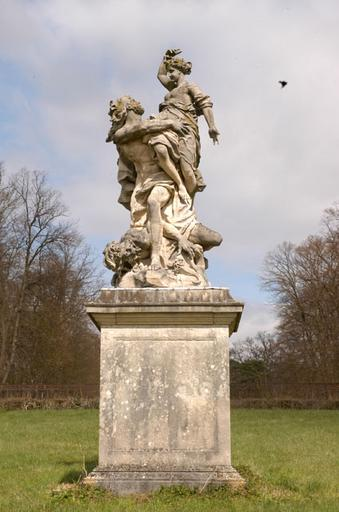
Hercules Abducting Deianera (1704)

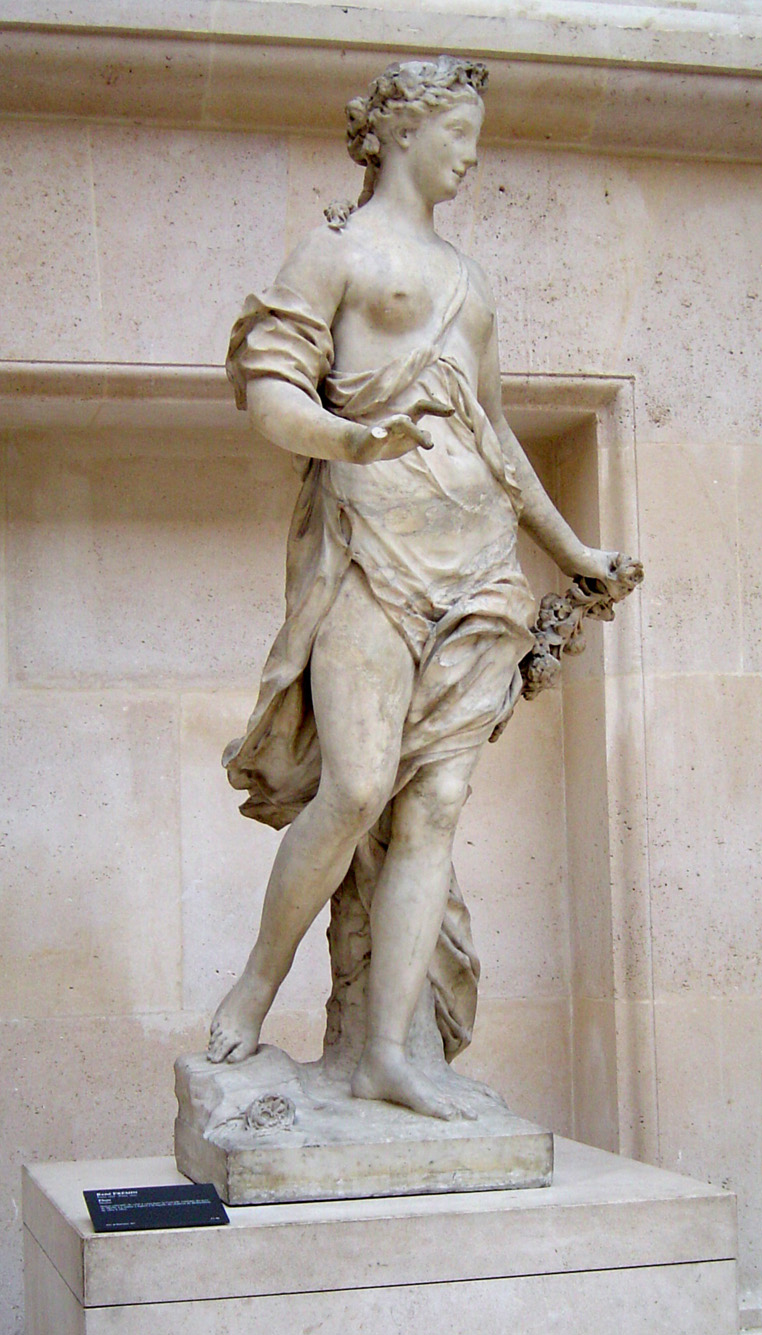
Flora (1706-9)

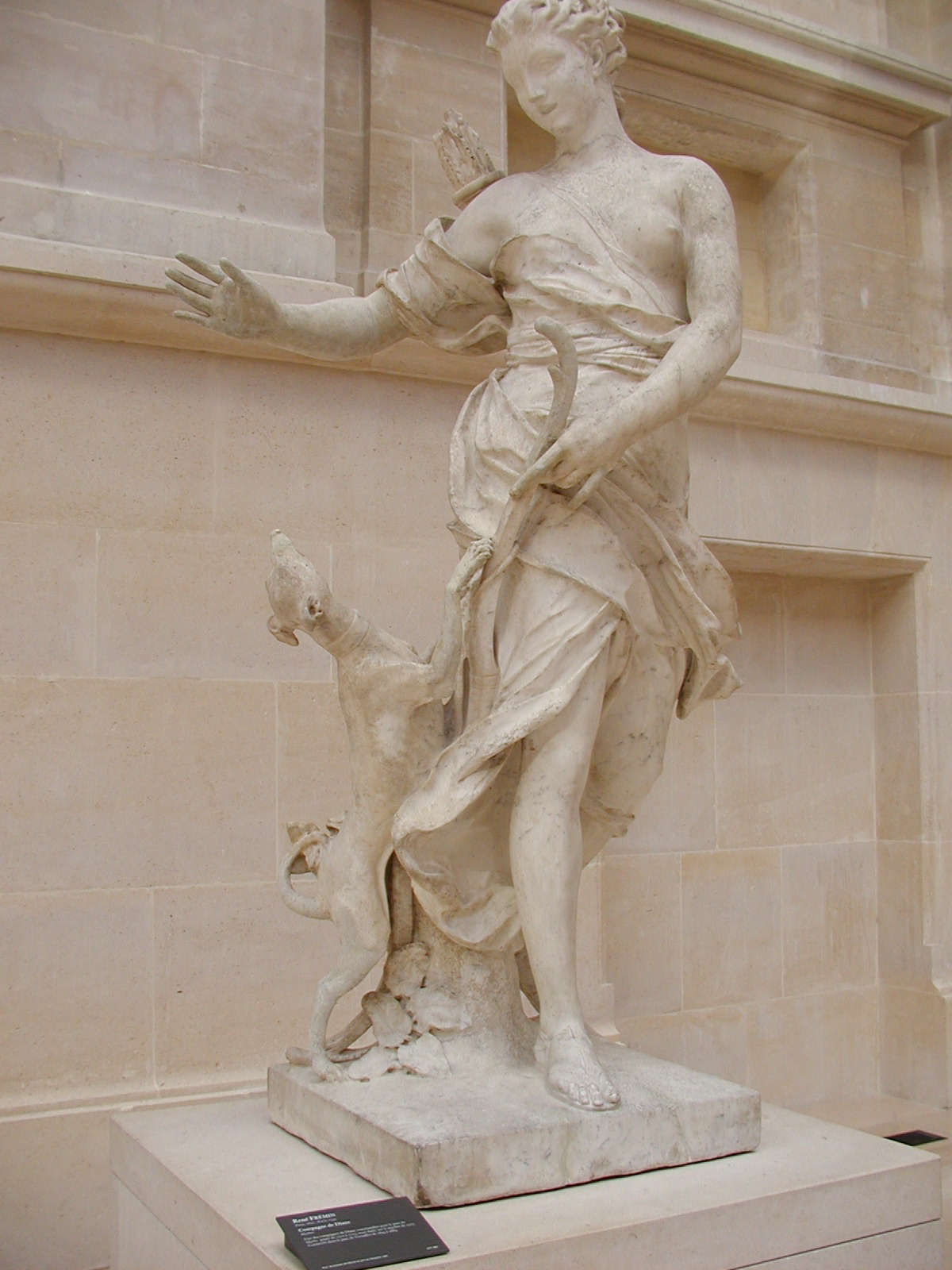
Companion of Diana (1710-1717)
