= Pierre-Jacques Cazes =

French painter (1676–1754)

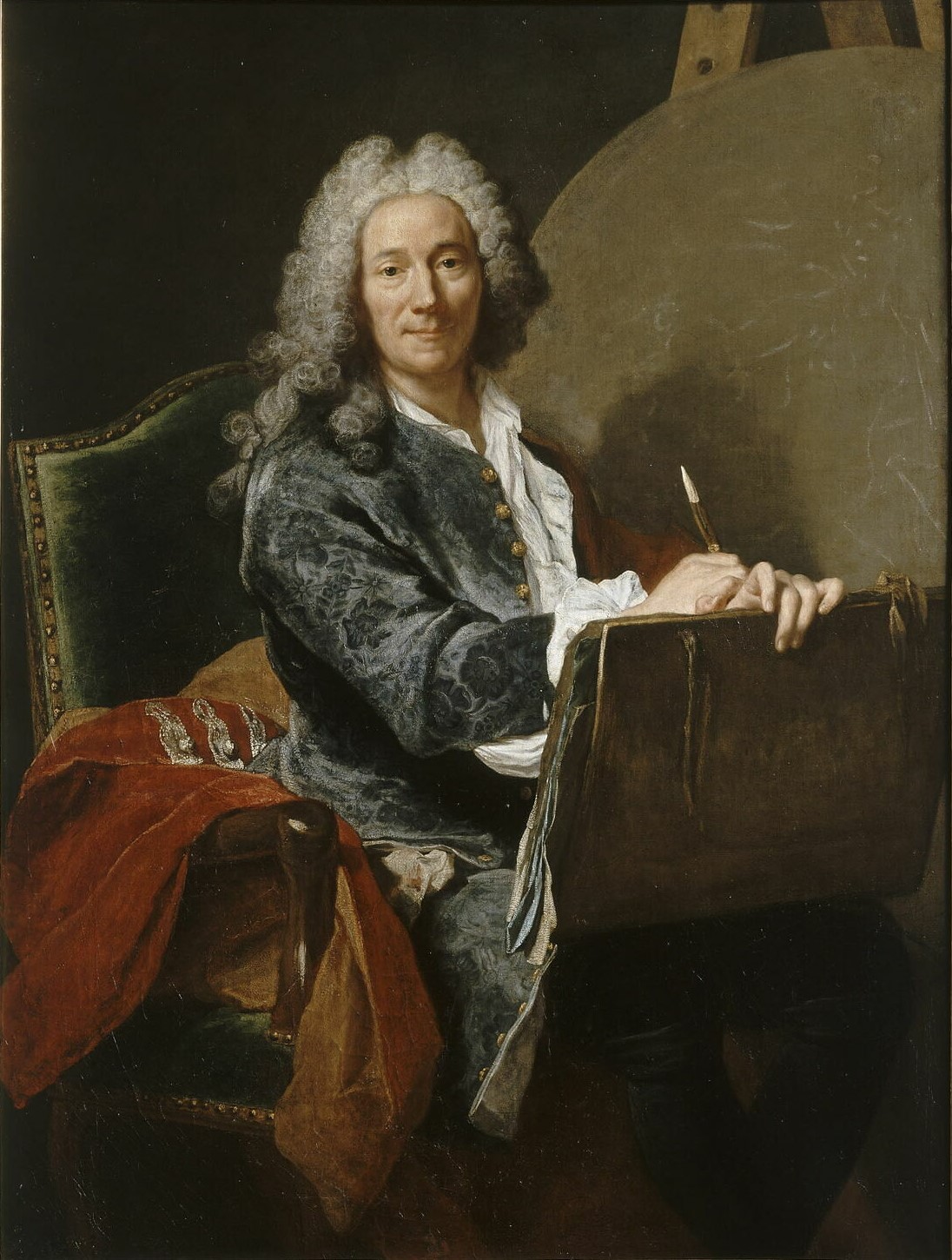
- Portrait of Cazes from 1734 by Académie member Joseph Aved
- Born: 1676; Paris, Kingdom of France
- Died: 25 June 1754 (aged 78); Paris, Kingdom of France
- Education: René-Antoine Houasse, Bon Boullogne
- Known for: Painting
- Children: Jacques Nicolas, Pierre Michel
- Awards: Prix de Rome (1699)

Director of the Académie Royale de Peinture et de Sculpture
- In office 1744–1747
- Monarch: Louis XV
- Preceded by: René Frémin
- Succeeded by: Charles-Antoine Coypel

Pierre-Jacques Cazes (1676 – 25 June 1754) was a French painter who specialized in religious and mythological subjects. He also taught several other French artists including François Boucher and Jean-Siméon Chardin.

== Biography ==
Cazes was born in Paris in 1676 to an officer and protégé of the Marquis de Louvois. At the behest of his father, Cazes was first tutored by an otherwise unknown artist named Ferou, concierge of the Académie Royale de Peinture et de Sculpture. He was later instructed by the painters René-Antoine Houasse and Bon Boullogne.

Cazes competed in the Prix de Rome competition of 1698 with Joseph’s Cup Found in Benjamin’s Belongings, but came in second place. He won the next year with Vision of Jacob in Egypt, but chose not to go to Rome and instead remain in Paris. He was received as an academician at the Académie Royale in 1703 with a Triumph of Hercules over Achelous. Cazes would later become its Director in 1744.

He worked in the Galerie d'Apollon in the Louvre in 1727 and produced a large number of religious paintings for churches in Paris and Versailles. His historical painting is in the same academic tradition as the French painters Charles Le Brun and Charles de Lafosse. He also painted paintings with mythological motifs and genre scenes.

A portrait the artist wearing a wig and holding a portfolio was presented to the Académie Royale in 1734 by Chardin's friend Joseph Aved.

== Selected works ==
- Joseph’s Cup Found in Benjamin’s Belongings (1698) – Earned Cazes second place at the 1698 Prix de Rome
- Vision of Jacob in Egypt (1699) – Earned Cazes first place at the 1699 Prix de Rome, now at the Beaux-Arts de Paris
- Triumph of Hercules over Achelous (1703) – Cazes's reception piece for the Académie Royale, now lost
- St. Cecilia (1704) – Exhibited at the Salon of 1704, now at the Church of Saint-Médard, Paris
- Le Christ et la Cananéenne (1706) – Produced for the May of 1706, now at the Musée des beaux-arts d'Arras
- Saint Pierre ressuscitant Tabithe (1720) – Produced for May 1720 for Saint-Germain-des-Prés, now lost. A reduction resides at The Louvre, Paris
- The Swing (1732) – The Louvre, Paris
- Venus, Eros and Anteros – Crocker Art Museum, Sacramento
- Saint Francis receiving the stigmata – Church of Saint-Michel-de-Sillery, Quebec City

== Gallery (partial) ==
Works by Pierre-Jacques Cazes

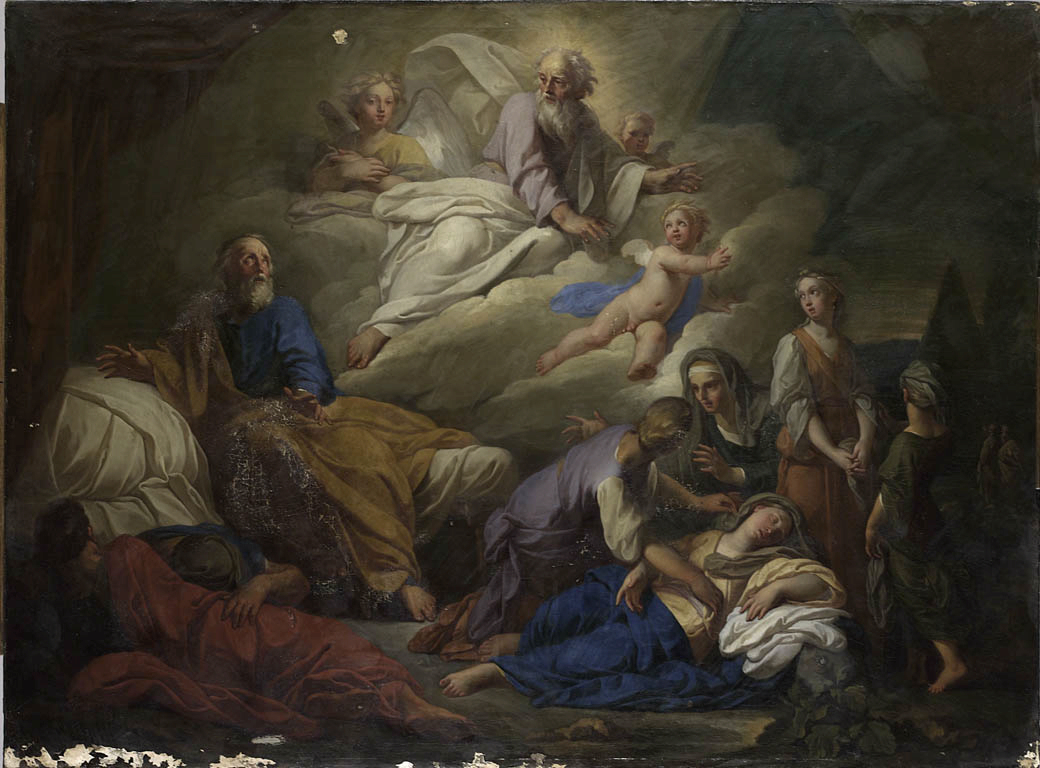
Vision of Jacob in Egypt (1699)

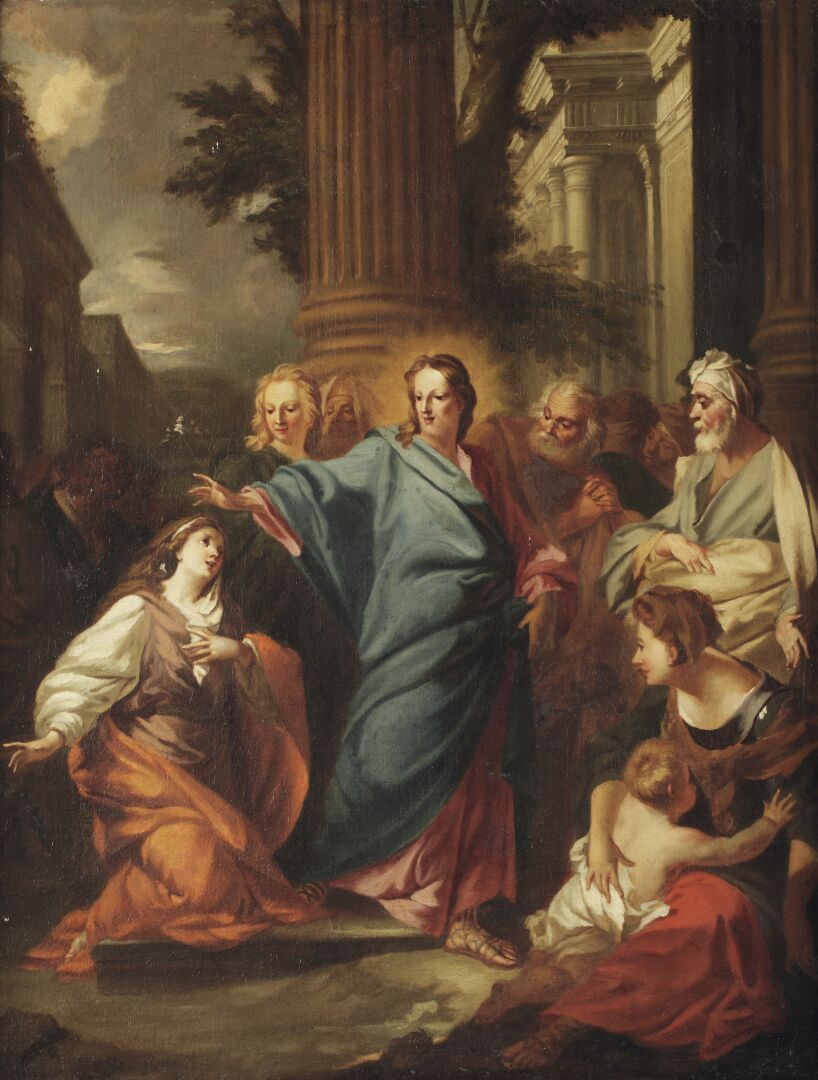
Le Christ et la Cananéenne (1706; reduction of original that hung in Notre Dame)

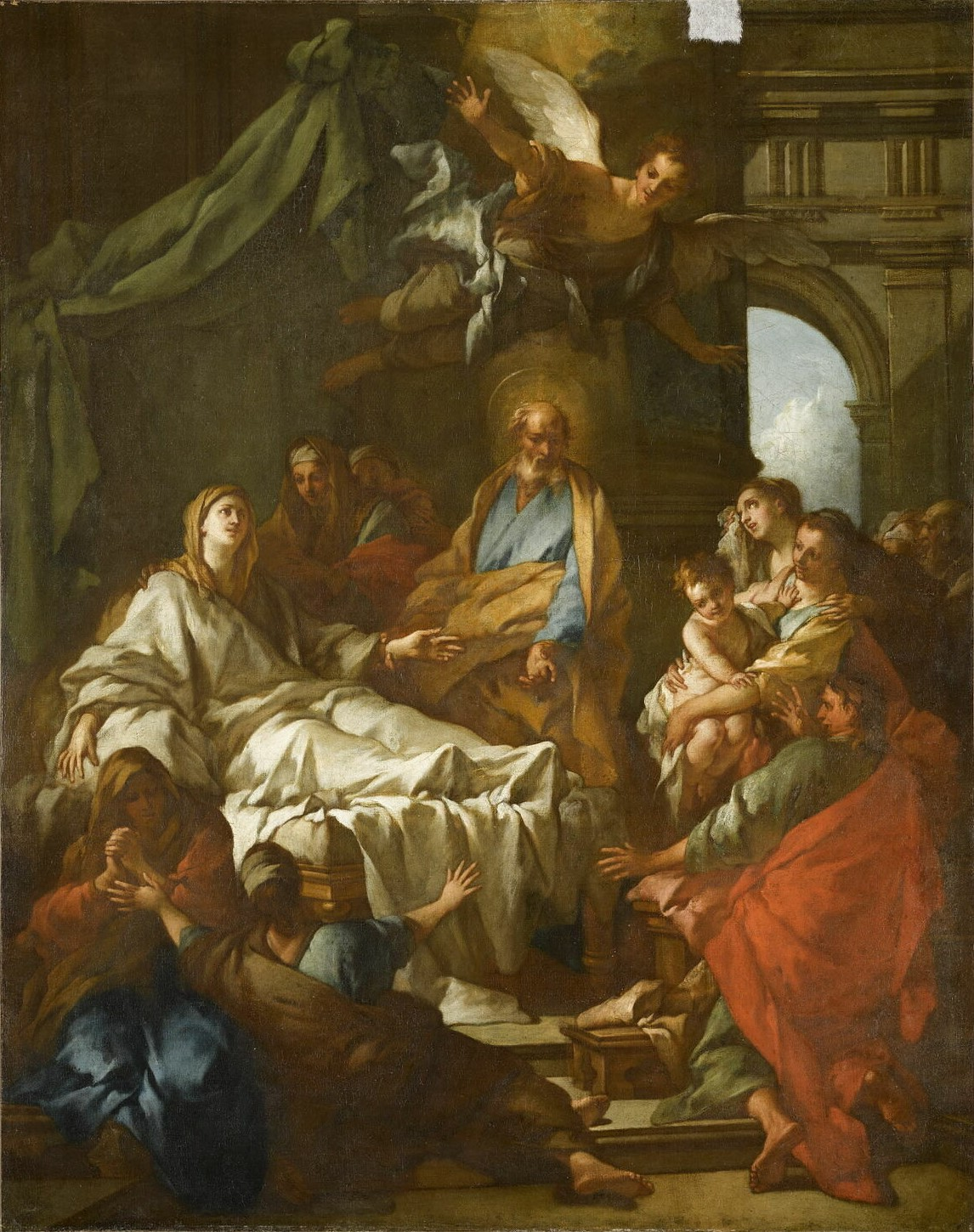
St. Peter raising Tabitha (1720; reduction of original that hung in Saint-Germain-des-Prés)

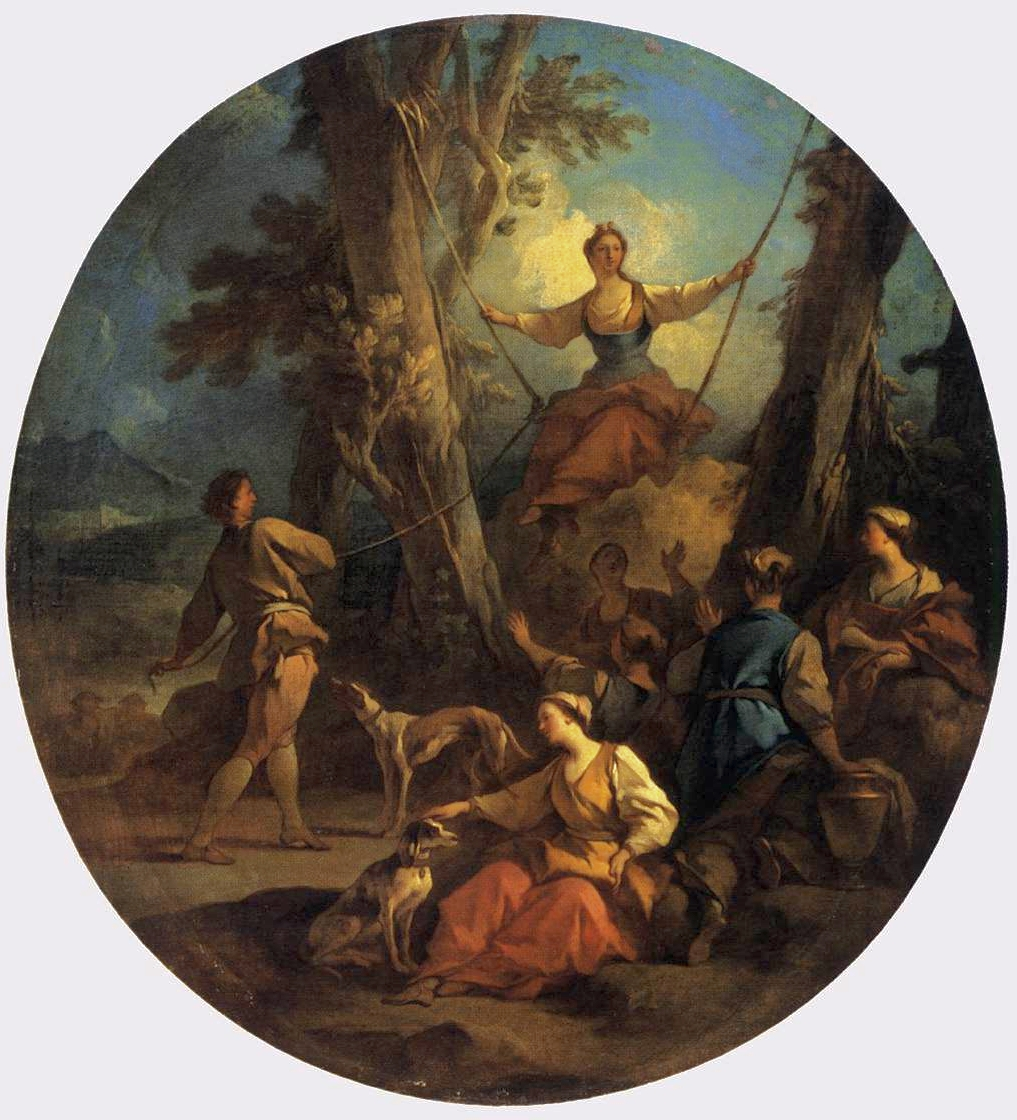
The Swing (1732)

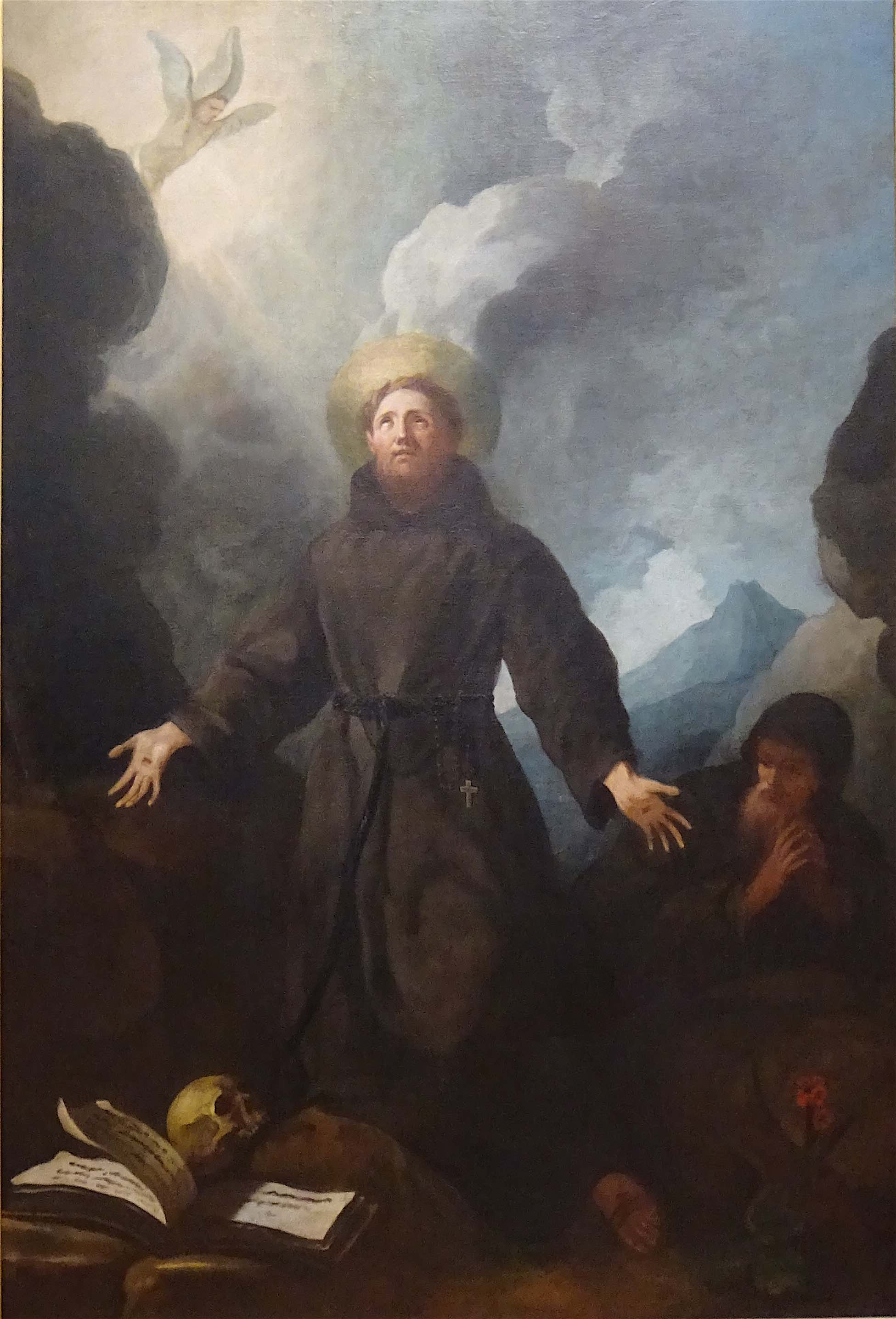
Saint Francis receiving the stigmata
