= Royal Palace of La Granja de San Ildefonso =

Palace in Sal Ildefonso, Spain

Coordinates: 40°53′51″N 4°00′16″W

- Palacio Real de La Granja de San Ildefonso
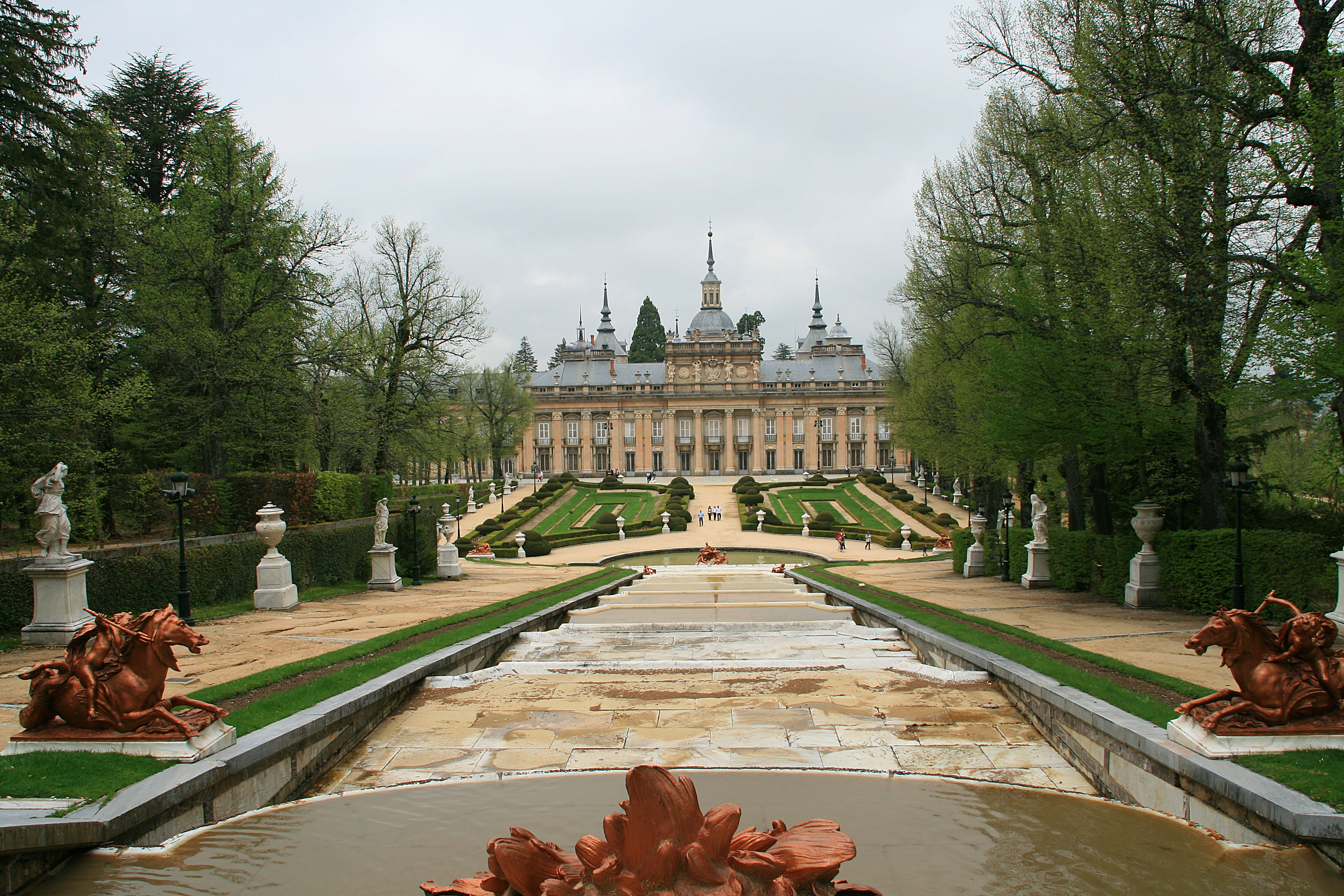

General information
- Architectural style: Rococo
- Location: Real Sitio de San Ildefonso (Segovia), Spain
- Construction started: 1721
- Opened: Exclusive property for the monarch: 1724
- Operator: Patrimonio Nacional

Technical details
- Size: 25,000 square metres (270,000 sq ft)
- Grounds: 146 hectares (360 acres) of gardens

Design and construction
- Architect: Teodoro Ardemans

Spanish Cultural Heritage
- Official name: Palacio de San Ildefonso con sus dependencias y Jardines
- Type: Non-movable
- Criteria: Monument
- Designated: 11 August 1925
- Reference no.: RI-51-0000314

Spanish Cultural Heritage
- Official name: Jardines del Palacio de San Ildefonso
- Type: Non-movable
- Criteria: Historic Garden
- Designated: 3 June 1931
- Reference no.: RI-52-0000002

The Royal Palace of La Granja de San Ildefonso (Spanish: Palacio Real de La Granja de San Ildefonso), known as La Granja, is an early 18th-century palace in the small town of San Ildefonso, located in the hills near Segovia and 80 kilometres (50 mi) north of Madrid, within the Province of Segovia in central Spain.

It became the summer residence of the kings of Spain from the 1720s during the reign of King Philip V. The palace is in a restrained Baroque style, surrounded by extensive gardens in the formal Jardin à la française style with sculptural fountains. It is now open to the public as a museum.

== History ==
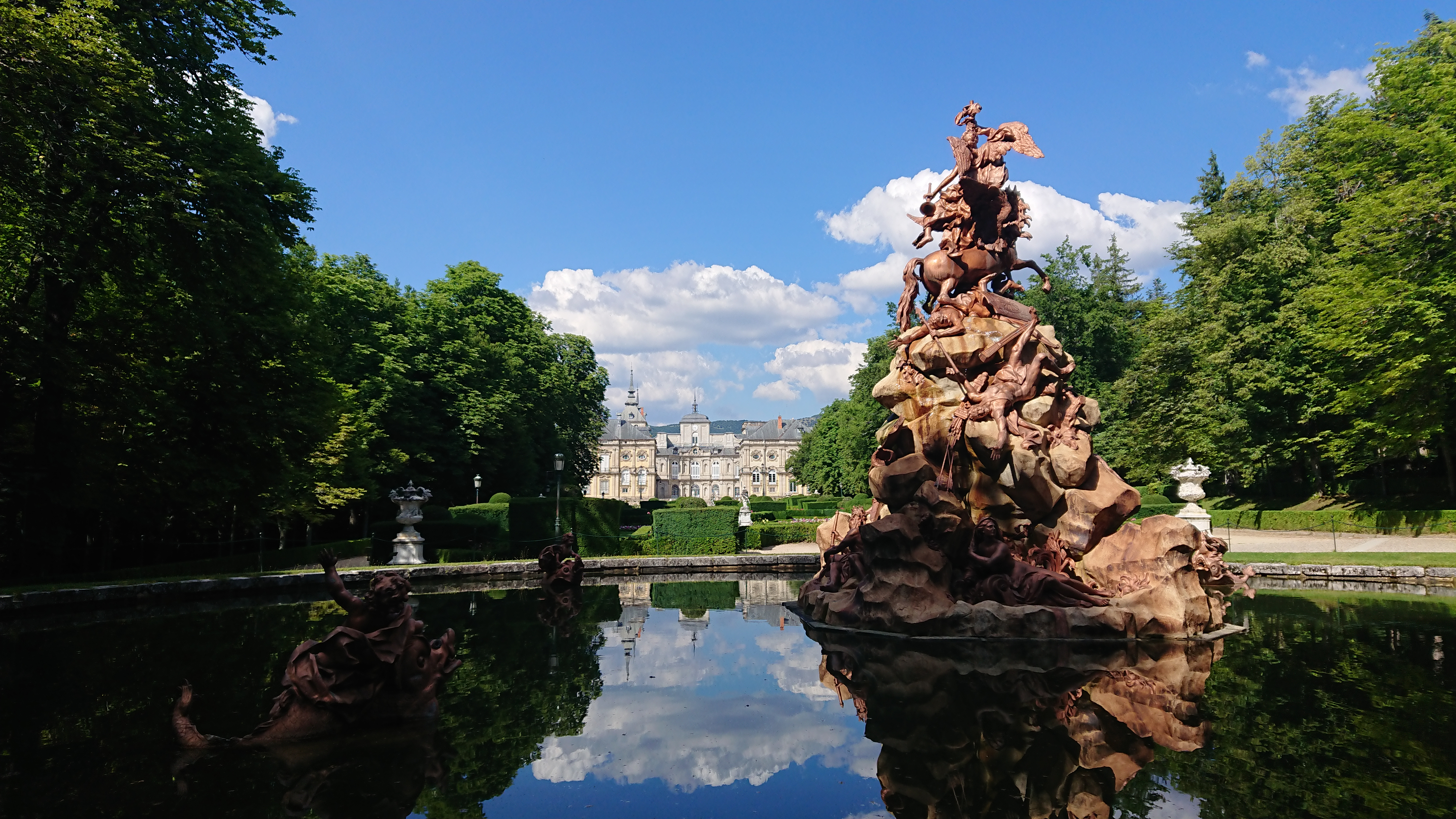
"Fame" fountain and lateral garden facade of La Granja.

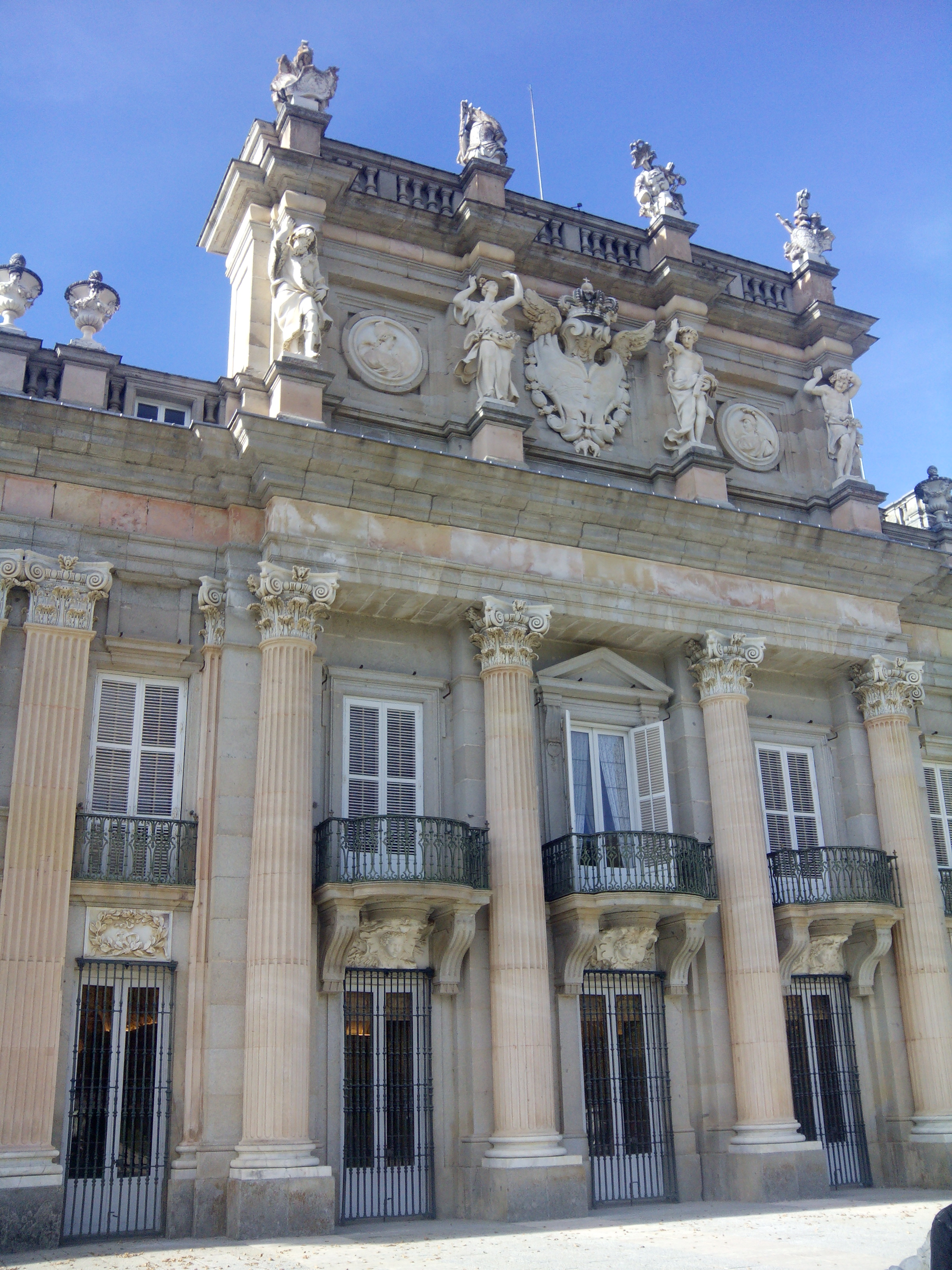
Baroque main facade with architectural sculptures.

The area was a favourite hunting grounds for many Castilian kings, due to its location on the forested northern slopes of the Sierra de Guadarrama. In the 15th century, Henry IV of Castile built the first hunting lodge on the site, along with a small shrine dedicated to Saint Ildephonsus of Toledo, which gave this place its first name.

Isabella I of Castile granted both buildings to the monks of the Santa Maria del Parral monastery in Segovia, who built an almshouse and developed a granja (farm) alongside the lodge and shrine.

=== Palace ===
The site was purchased from the monks in 1719 by King Philip V, after his nearby summer Palace of Valsain burned to a shell. He was the first Spanish king from the French Bourbon dynasty. Beginning in 1721, Philip began building a new palace and gardens modeled on Versailles, built by his grandfather, Louis XIV of France. Like Versailles it embraced a cour d'honneur on the approaching side, and formal gardens, with a main axis centred on the palace, that were surrounded by woodland in which further hidden garden features were disposed. Like Versailles, La Granja began as a retreat from the court but became a centre of royal government.

For the architect, Philip began with an unpretentious project by the Spanish architect Teodoro Ardemans, incorporating a chapel centred on one facade, which was enlarged in a second phase, ca 1728-34 under Andrea Procaccini and Sempronio Subisati, who provided the courtyards in the flanks, then given its definitive character by Filippo Juvarra, who was brought from Turin, based on recommendations in the circle of Philip's second queen, Elizabeth Farnese of Parma, and his assistant, Giovanni Battista Sacchetti.

When the King decided to abdicate in 1724, his intention was to retire to La Granja. Unfortunately Philip's heir, King Louis I, died that same year, and Philip had to return to the throne. Consequently, a place designed for leisure and quiet retreat thus became an important meeting place for the King, his ministers and the court. The town of San Ildefonso expanded to provide housing and services to the courtiers who wanted a place near the king's favourite residence. Military barracks, a collegiate church (1721–1724, built to designs of Teodoro Ardemans, and dedicated to the Holy Trinity, 22 December 1723), and even a royal glass factory (1728) were built to provide for the palace. The glass factory, which had some initial successes from 1720 at Nuevo Baztan in the province of Madrid, was moved under the direction of its Catalan foreman, Ventura Sit, to San Ildefonso, where supplies of timber were plentiful, and a royal patron was near. The best glass of Venetian type produced in the works dates from the last quarter of the 18th century. As La Granja de San Ildefonso, the glassworks continue today as a subsidiary of Saint Gobain.

The church was selected as his burial site by Philip, marking a break with his Habsburg predecessors. The frescoes by Giambattista Tiepolo, completed by Francisco Bayeu, were badly damaged in a fire of 1918.

Philip's successor Ferdinand VI bequeathed the royal site of San Ildefonso, with all it contained, to his father's second wife, Elisabeth Farnese, who was effectively forced to live there, well away from Madrid politics, for the duration of his reign. She maintained a considerable court there. At her death in 1766, it reverted to the Crown in the person of her son Charles III.

For the next one hundred and twenty years, La Granja was the court's main summer palace, and many royal weddings and burials, state treaties, and political events took place within its walls. However, from the 1880's the court preferred to sojourn at the seaside palaces in the Basque Country and the royal site became rarely used. In 1918 a major fire damaged the palace and although the damage was repaired much of the interior decoration and contents were lost.

Currently the royal site is part the Patrimonio Nacional of Spain, which holds and maintains many of the Crown's lands and palaces. It is a popular tourist attraction, with gardens, and interiors displaying rooms with Carrara marble, Japanese lacquerware, and crystal chandeliers; portraits and other paintings; and a Museum of Flemish tapestries.

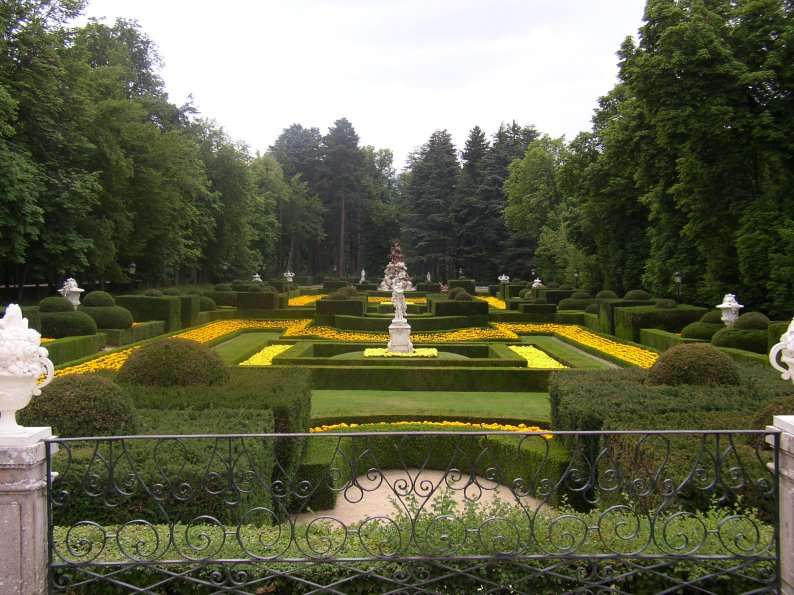
Jardin à la française style garden at La Granja.

=== Gardens ===
Extending over 1,500 acres (6.1 km^{2}), the gardens around the palace are one of the best examples of 18th-century European garden design in the Jardin à la française style in Spain. The French designer from the official French royal offices of Robert de Cotte was René Carlier, who used the natural slope of the site in the palace grounds design, for enhancing axial visual perspectives, and to provide sufficient head for water to shoot out/up from the twenty-six sculptural fountains in the formal gardens and landscape park.

Sculptors arrived from Paris to execute designs on the site. They included: René Frémin (1672–1744, at La Granja until 1738), to whom the execution of many vases and sculptures was attributed in 18th-century inventories; Jean Thierry; and others who are little more than names in archival references.

==== Fountains ====
All of the fountains represent themes from classical mythology, including Greek deities, allegories and scenes from myths. They are cast in lead to prevent corrosion, and painted over to simulate bronze, a nobler material, or lacquered over white oxidised lead to imitate marble. A group of richly sculptural vases have been attributed to designs by the "dazzling maverick" Gilles-Marie Oppenord, which were probably forwarded through the offices of Robert de Cotte, overseeing French royal building projects as intendant des Bâtiments du Roi. Bruno Pons noted in the sculptural vases "an almost excessively brilliant style, quite distinct from French royal taste and showing an undeniably superior understanding of ornament".

The "Baths of Diana" fountain is the focal point of several garden alleés. The base of the structure was made of lead, however it was painted to look like bronze and marble. It and its marble statues form some of the most well conserved architecture from this period in Spain. Frémin, Thierry, and Jacques Bousseau led a team of sculptors who between 1720 and 1745 created this feature which was brought to life by the fountains' water displays. However, regarding the elaborate "Baths of Diana", the chronically depressed Philip remarked, "It has cost me three millions and amused me three minutes."

The original waterworks and piping are still functional. They rely purely on gravity to project water up the fountain jets, including to the 40 metres (130 ft) height of the "Fame" fountain. A reservoir, El Mar (the Sea), lies secluded at the highest point of the landscape park, and provides the supply and water pressure for the whole system. In spite of the protests of the royal accountant, in 1736 twelve dromedaries were sent from the Royal Palace of Aranjuez to help in the works of the reservoir. The last one died in 1740.

In the present day, only a few fountains are active on each day. Twice a year, on the feast days of San Fernando and of San Luis, all twenty-six fountains are set to jet and flow, providing memorable experiences.

== Gallery ==
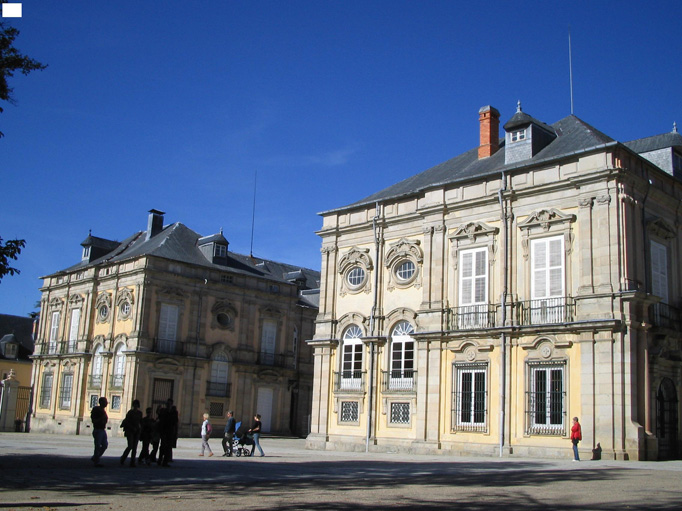
La Granja façade at Patio de la Herradura.

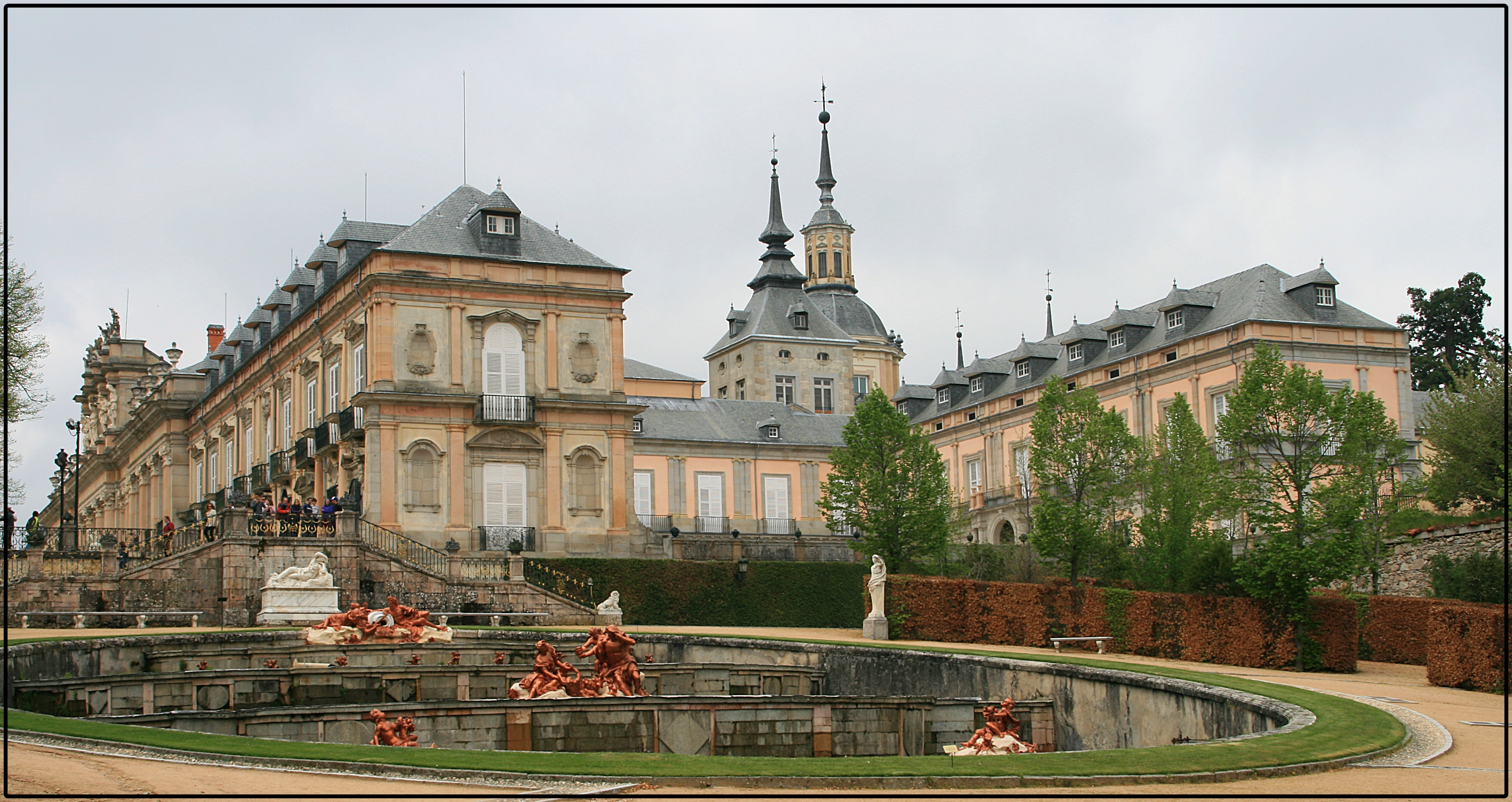
Fountains and Patio de Coches facade.

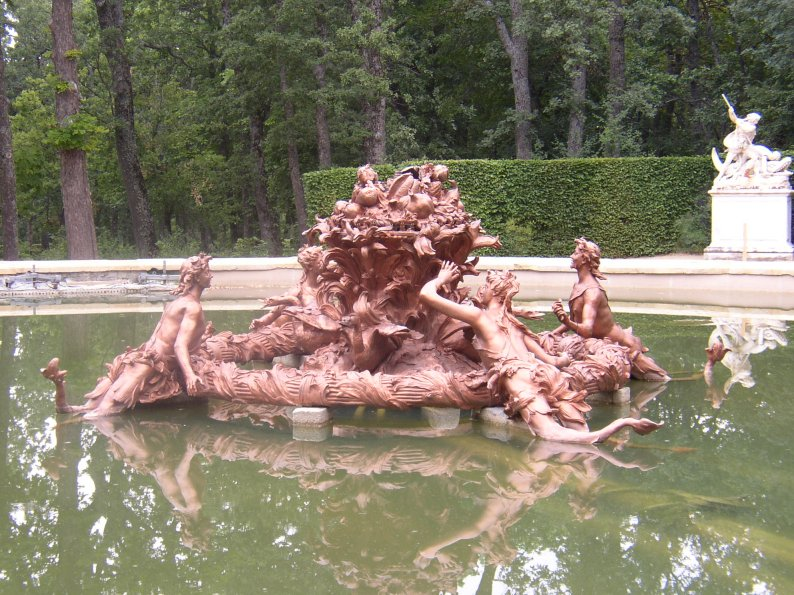
Fountain in the gardens of La Granja.

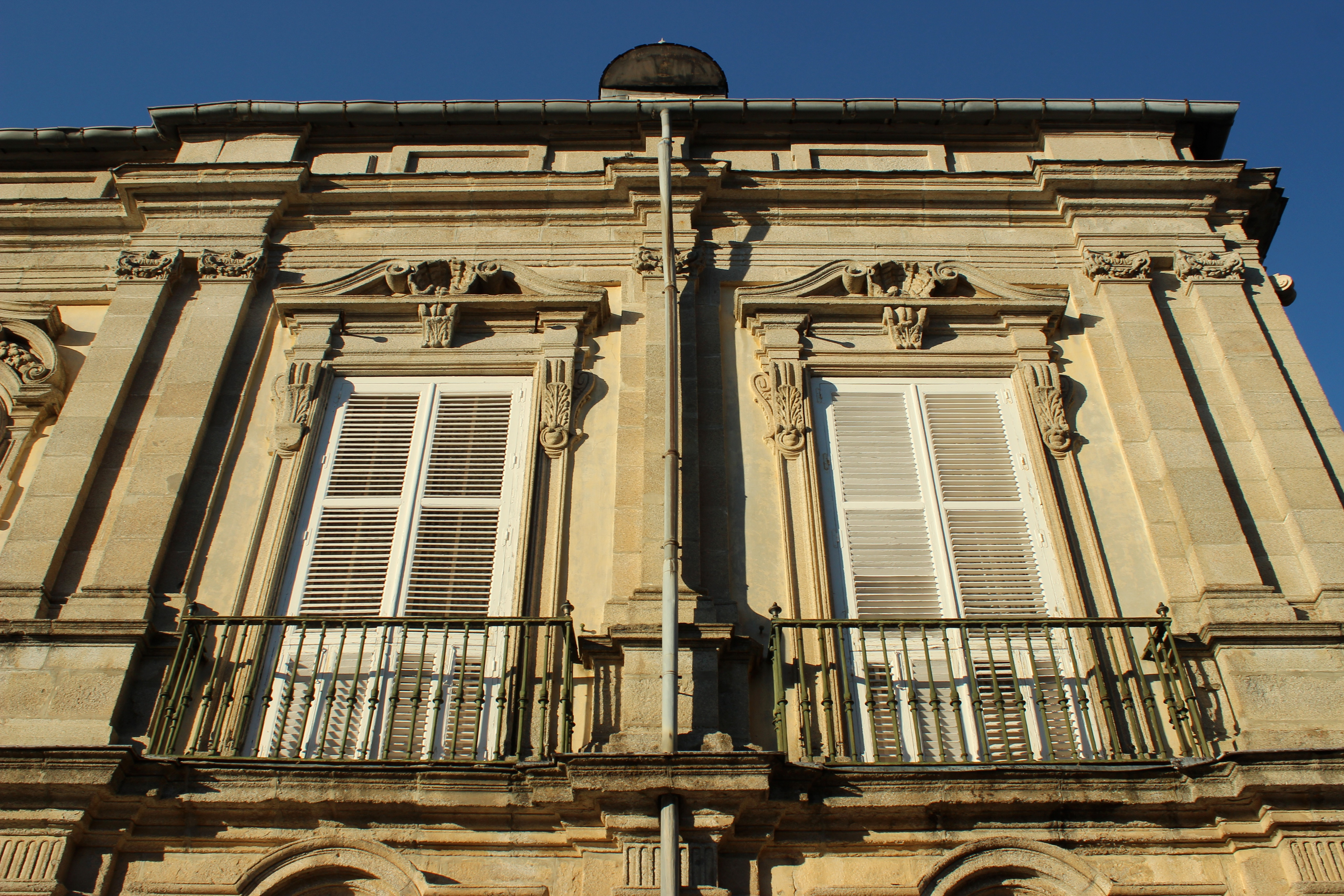
Façade detail.

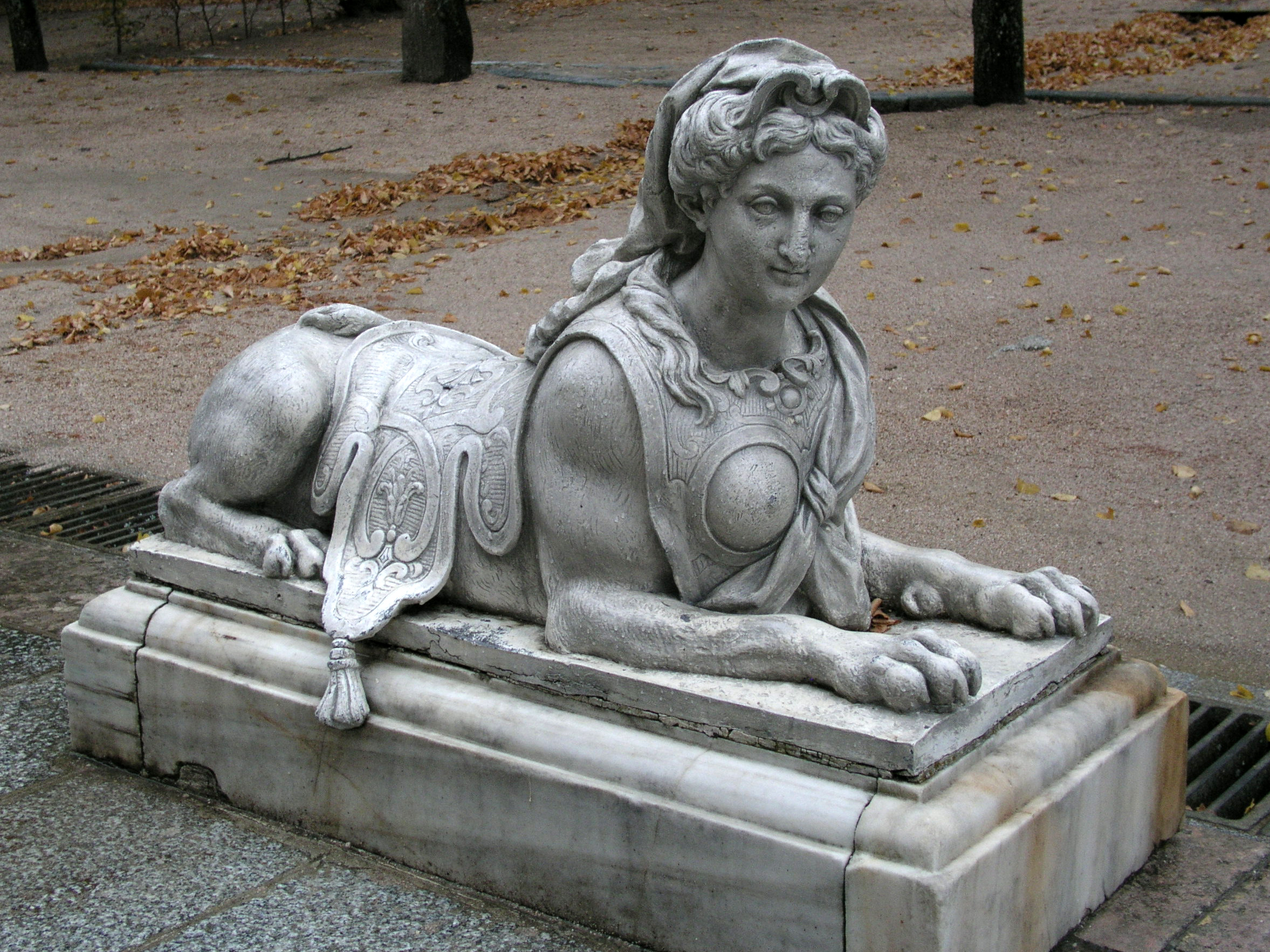
Sphinx on rear terrace at La Granja.

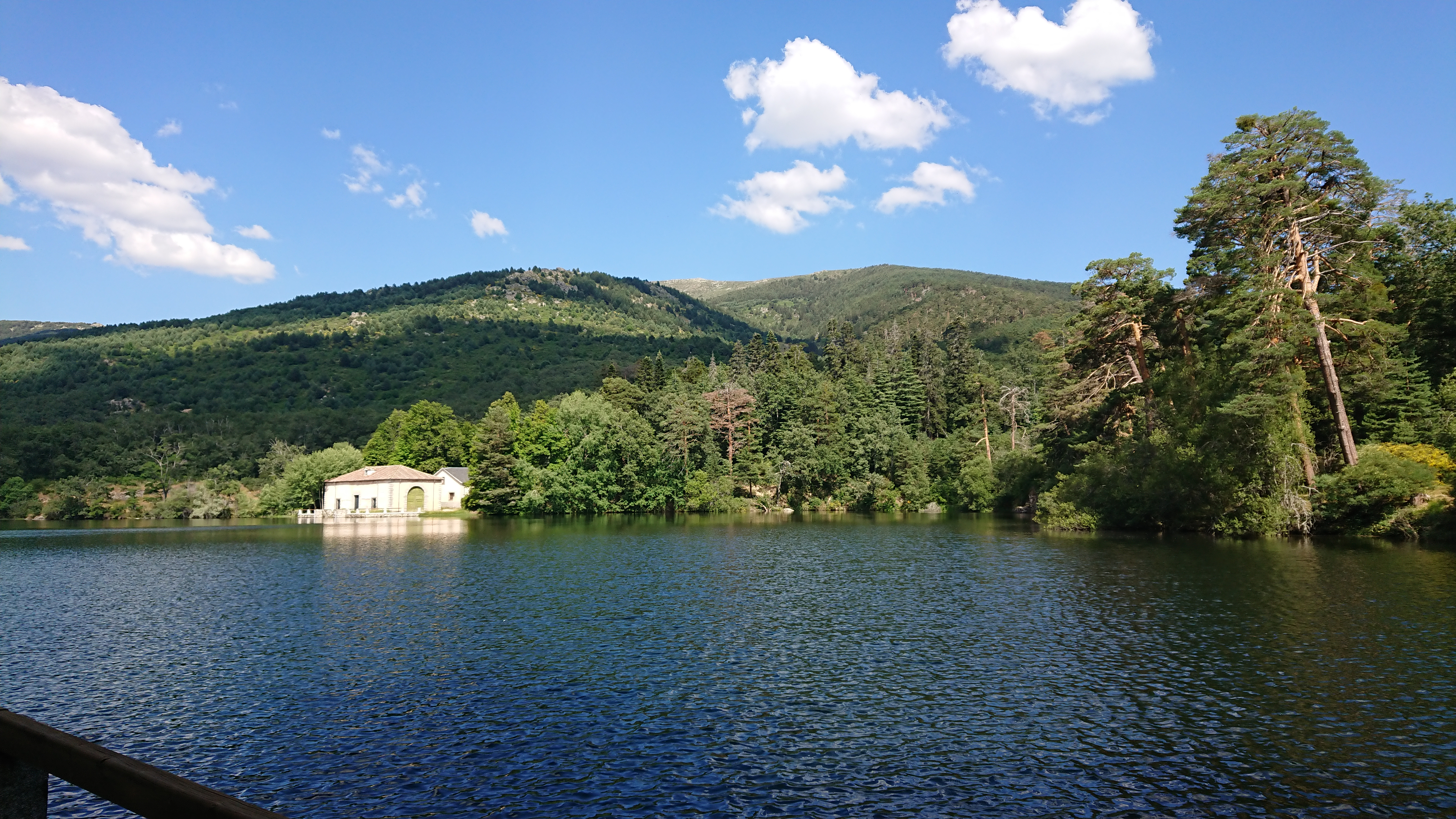
El Mar (The Sea)

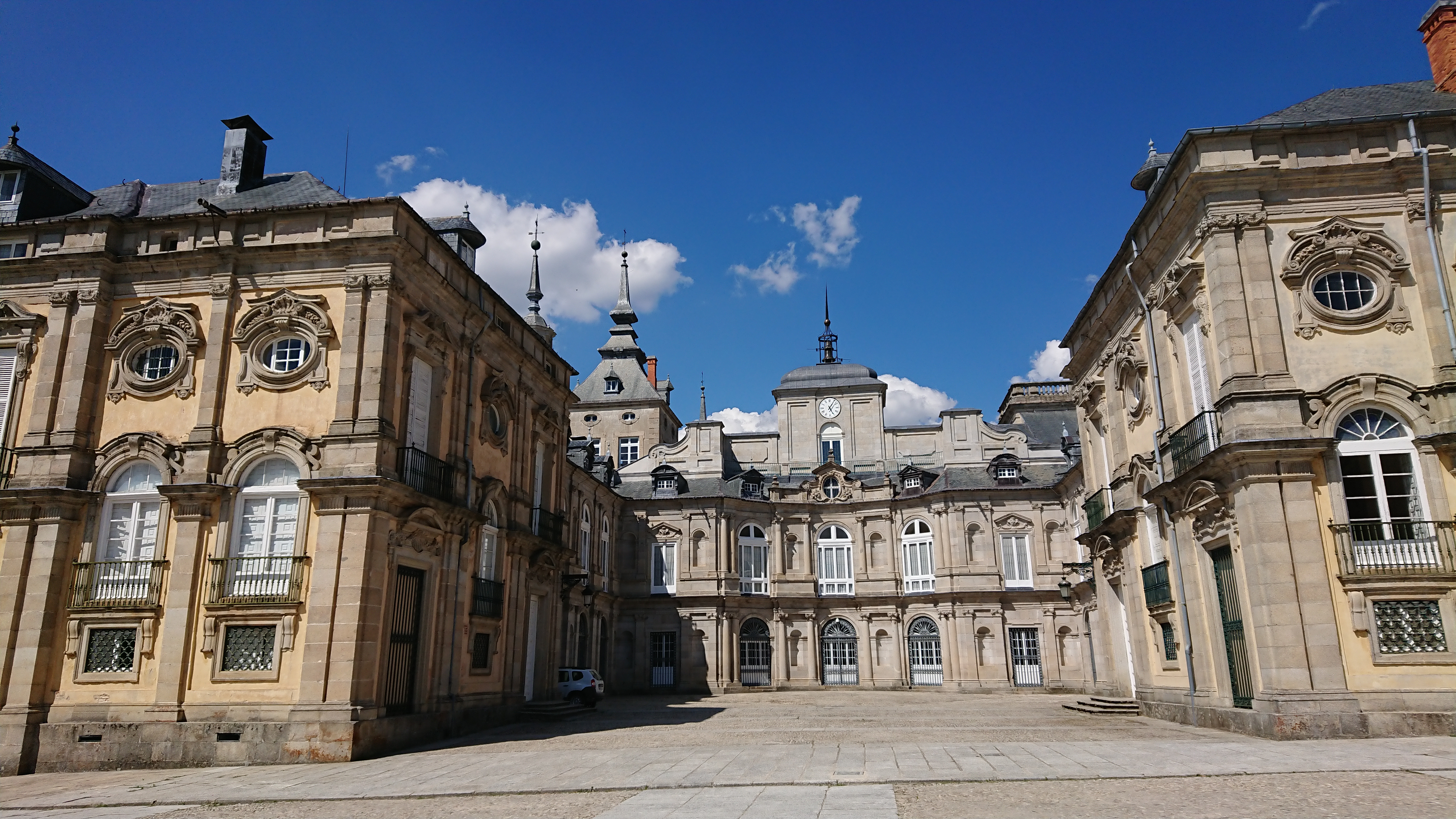
Patio de la Herradura courtyard

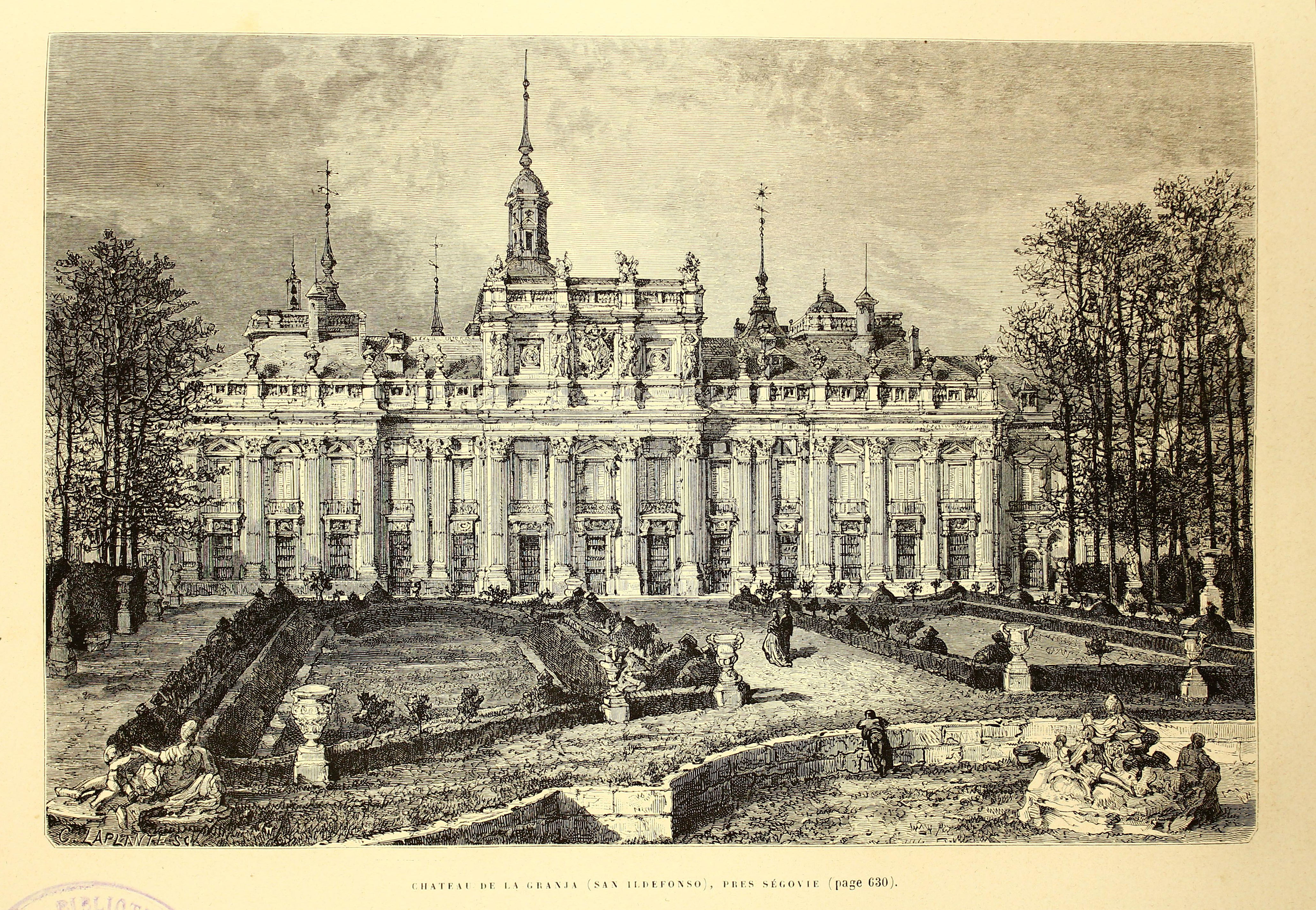
Print of La Granja palace and gardens in 1873.
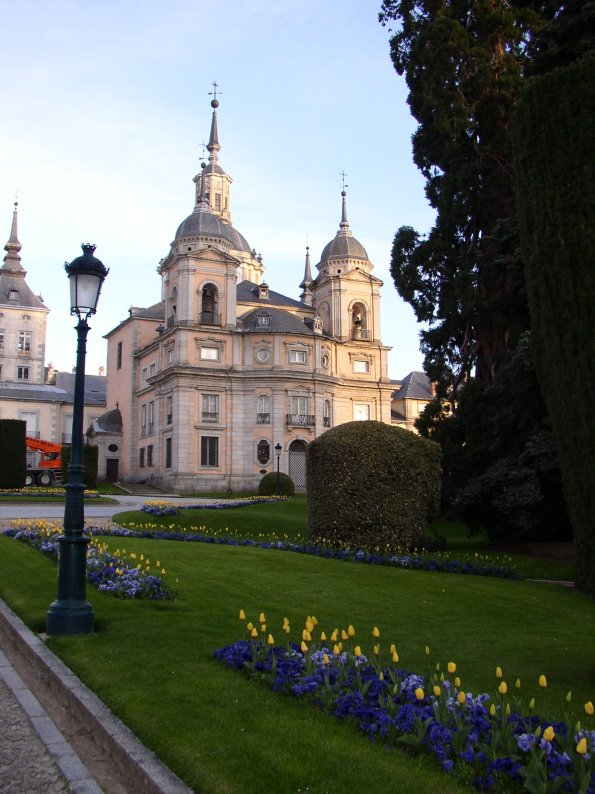
Royal chapel at La Granja.

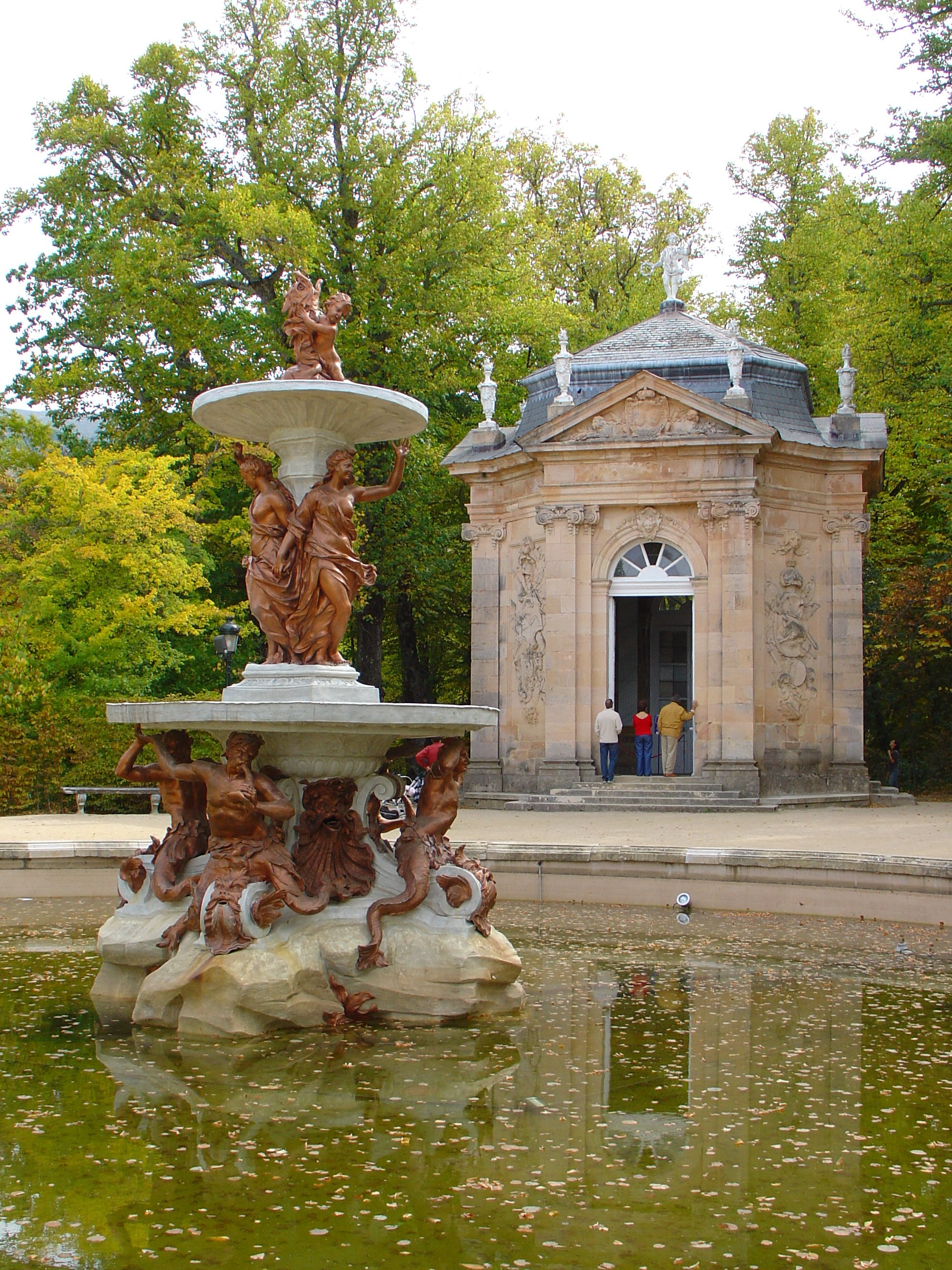
Fountain and music temple in gardens.

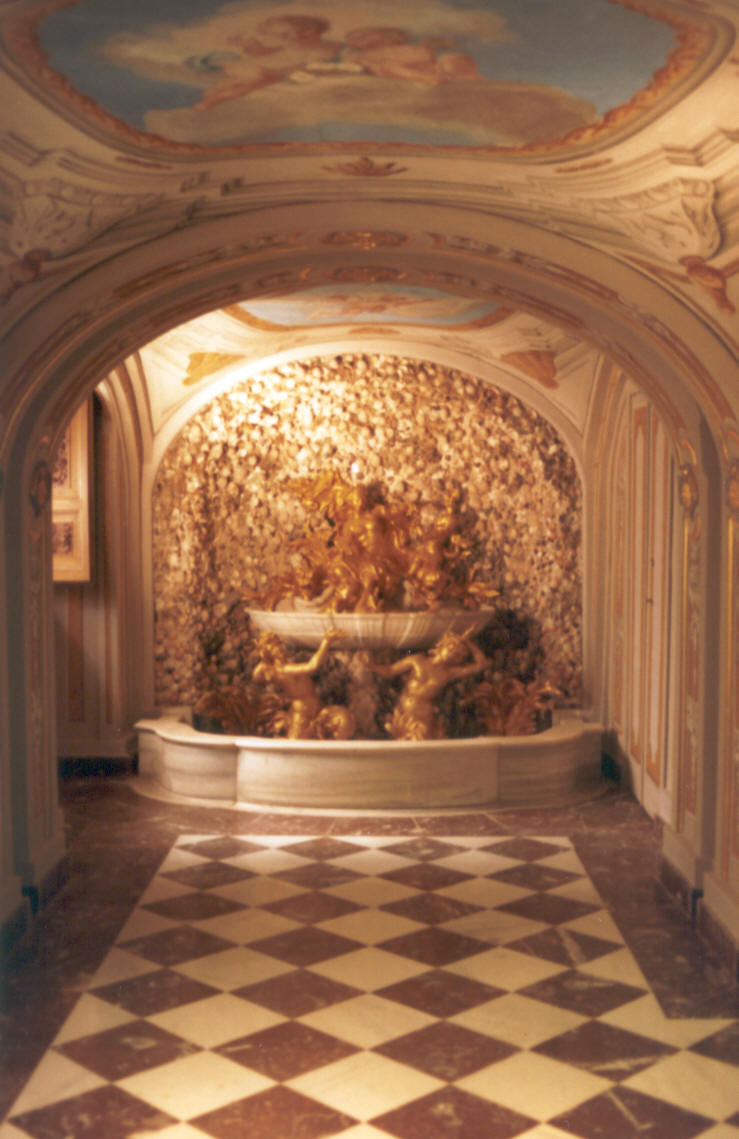
Interior of Retreat Room.

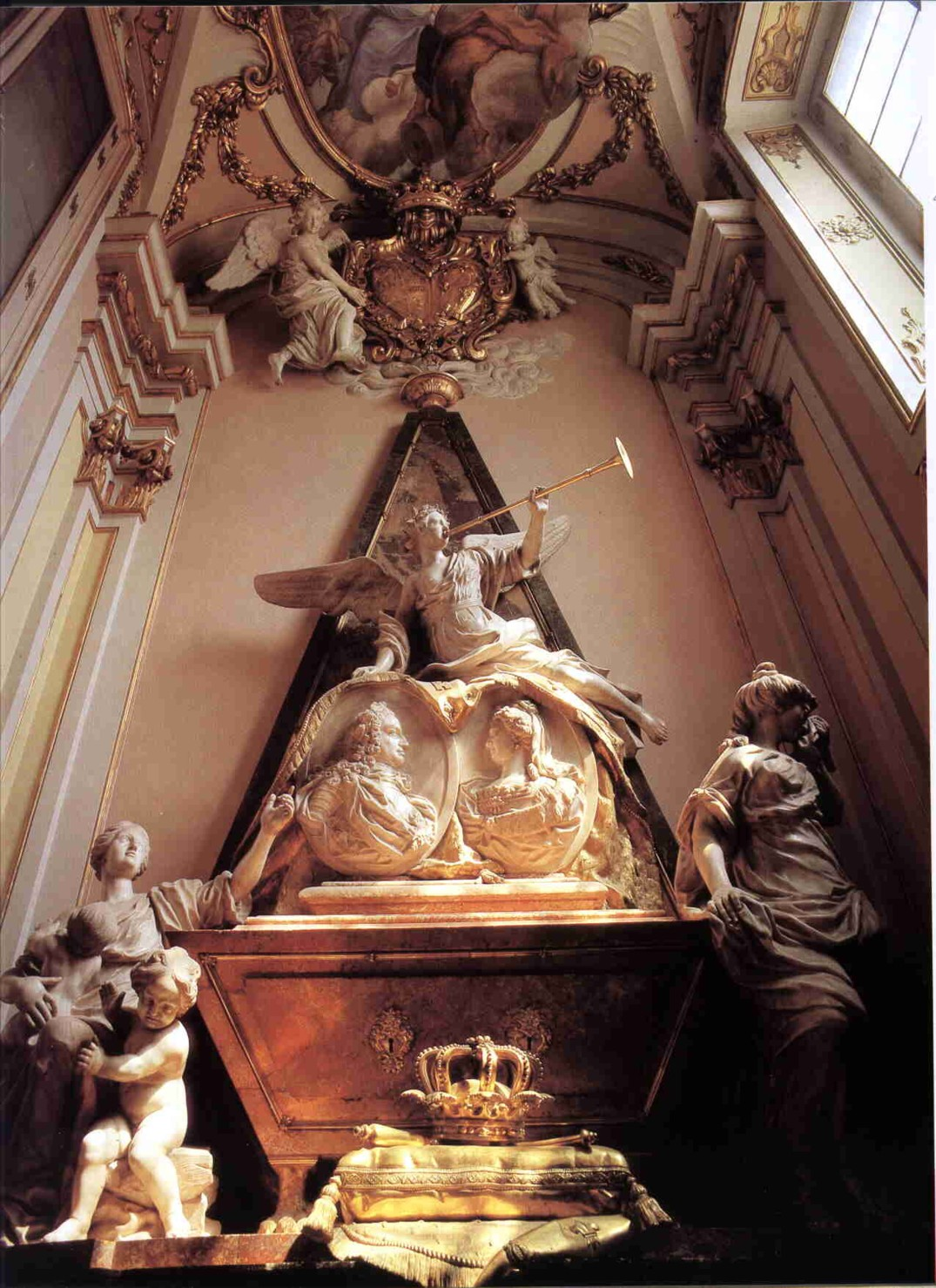
Funerary Monument of King Philip V and Elizabeth Farnese, by Dumandre & Puthois.

== See also ==
- List of Baroque residences
- Buildings inspired by Versailles
- Gardens in Spain
