= San Filippo Neri, Turin =

Church of San Filippo Neri
- Chiesa di San Filippo Neri
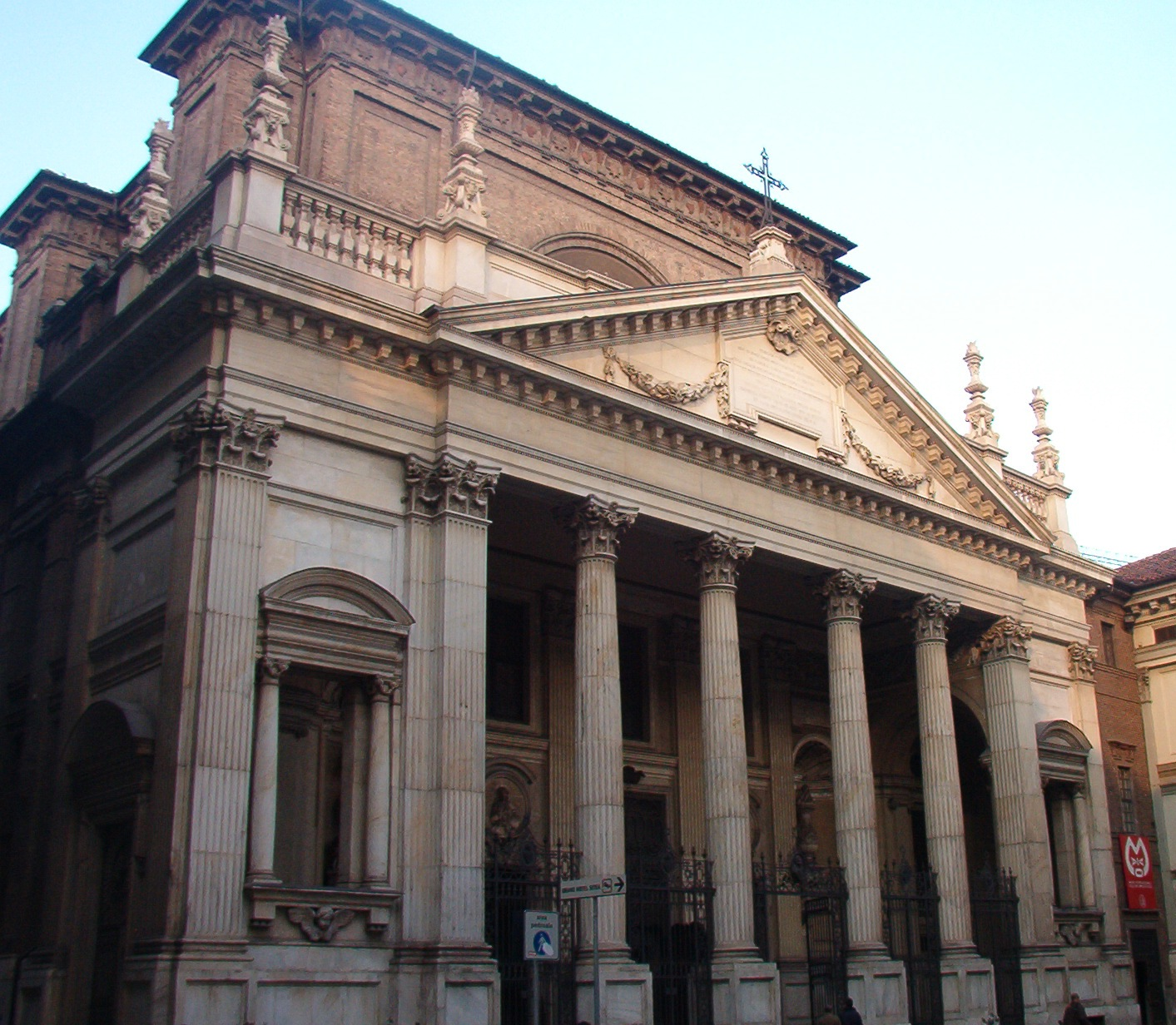
- Façade of the church

- Map of Turin
- 45.0683°N 7.6847°E
- Country: Italy
- Denomination: Roman Catholic Church

Architecture
- Style: Baroque and neoclassical
- Groundbreaking: 1675
- Completed: 1730

Administration
- Archdiocese: Turin

San Filippo Neri is a late-Baroque style, Roman Catholic church located in Turin, region of Piedmont, Italy. The church is located on Via Maria Vittoria 5; the left flank of the nave faces the Turin Academy of Sciences. The church is still used for services. 69 metres (226 ft) long and 37 metres (121 ft) wide, it is the largest church in the city of Turin.

== History ==
The church was commissioned late in life by Charles Emmanuel II, Duke of Savoy, and completed after his death in 1675 with the patronage of his widow Maria Giovanna Battista of Savoy-Nemours. The original design was by Antonio Bettini, however, the roof of this original church collapsed in 1706 during the fierce Siege of Turin by French forces.

The church was rebuilt (1715–1730) according to designs by Filippo Juvarra. The main altar (1703) was designed by Antonio Bertola with six Solomonic columns surmounted by statues of Faith Hope and Charity by Carlo Francesco Plura. The altarpiece was painted by Carlo Maratta, and the tribune and choir framed with putti sculpted by Stefano Maria Clemente. One church chapel has a canvas of Beato Valfrè by Ferdinando Cavalleri. The sacristy was frescoed by Luigi Vacca. The adjacent oratory (to the right of the facade) was designed by Bettini. The painting of the Immaculate Conception of the Virgin was painted by Sebastiano Conca with frescoes by Gaetano Perego.

The imposing Neoclassic pronaos (1823) of the facade, designed by Giuseppe Maria Talucchi has four monumental columns, flanking advanced wings with pilasters, and a triangular tympanum. The sober linearity clashes with the decorative interior with its playful, shell-shaped Juvarrian window frames. The six chapels have elliptical domes. Juvarra designed the polychrome marble pavement of the presbytery. Along the nave are medallion bas-reliefs by Giovanni Battista Bernero.

The oratory, located to the right of the facade, is mainly used for concerts and theatrical performances. On the outer (street-side) pilaster of the oratory facade, nearly three-quarters towards the top, is a cannonball embedded in the wall during the French siege of Turin in 1799. The oratory was designed by Antonio Bettini, although likely inspired by a prior design by Jurvarra. To the left of the oratory is the baptistry which houses a marble medallion of the Baptism of Christ. The oratory is rich in paintings. The main altar is a St Phillip with an Immaculate Conception by Sebastiano Conca. On the walls are four canvases depicting episodes in the Life of Mary, completed by Conca, his brother, and their studio, including an Annunciation, Visitation, Presentation of Jesus at the Temple, and an Assumption of the Virgin. Four smaller paintings depicting the Birth of the Virgin, the Presentation of Mary at the Temple, the Marriage of the Virgin, and Consolation of Mary, were painted by Mattia Franceschini. The ceiling fresco, depicting the Coronation of Mary, is attributed to Gaetano Perego.

For special feasts, such as Christmas, Pentecost, and the anniversary of the consecration of the church (in November), an altar plate (paliotto) is displayed, made of mother of pearl, ivory, tortoiseshell, and hard-wood. It was donated by the artist, Pietro Piffetti (1700–1777), to celebrate the first century of the congregation.

Between Christmas and Epiphany, the entrance to the church is decorated with a presepe consisting of 30 life-sized mannequins, dressed in period costume, sculpted by Anton Maria Maragliano (1664–1739).
