= Colonna Santa =

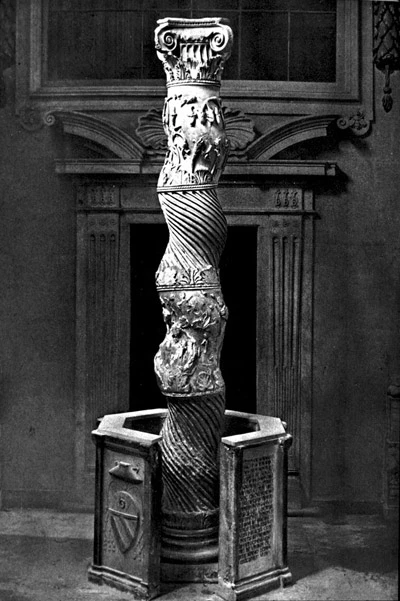
- Medium: Marble
- Dimensions: 4.74 m (15.5 ft)
- Location: The Treasury Museum, St. Peter's Basilica, Vatican City

The Colonna Santa is a lone column that was venerated in the past as a relic, currently kept in St. Peter's Basilica. Its name means "holy column" in Italian.

== History ==
The column dates back to the late 2nd or early 3rd century. It, along with 11 other columns, made up the pergola in the church's chancel since the late 6th century. In the 12th century, Petrus Mallius considered that the columns were part of the Temple in Jerusalem and, earlier, part of Apollo's temple in Troy.

By the late 12th century and during the 13th century, a myth had emerged in which the northeast column of the pergola had been used by Jesus to lean on during his sermons to the Jewish people. The column was also said to have healing powers, especially to those under spirit possession. This earned it the title colonna degli spiritati (Italian for "column of the possessed").

In 1438, the cardinal Giordano Orsini placed a stone guard rail, decorated with heraldic motifs, around the column, along with tall bars. The stone rail had the phrase de Salomonis templo inscribed onto it, regarding the column's supposed Solomonic origins.

The column was separated from the chancel's pergola in 1513, being moved to different locations within the old basilica.

Archaeological studies regarding the column were started in the late 19th century, due to it being moved from a chapel south from the Chapel of the Pietà in the currently standing basilica into the Chapel of the Pietà in 1888.

== Description ==
The column is made of white marble and has a height of 15.5 feet (4.74 meters). It belongs to the Solomonic order, with a shaft decorated with grape vines and a Composite capital.

In Old St. Peter's Basilica, the column was kept in the right side of the nave, next to the crossing, according to the plan of Tiberio Alfarano. It is currently kept in the Treasury Museum of the basilica.
