= Cartography of Sri Lanka =

The cartography of Sri Lanka is the history of the surveying and creation of maps of Sri Lanka. A list of maps of Sri Lanka in chronological order is shown below.

== Maps ==
Sortable table
| Date | Carto- grapher | Description | Image |
|---|---|---|---|
| 1482 | Francesco Berlinghieri | | |
| 1535 | Laurent Fries | Based on the 2nd century CE Geography | |
| 1595 | Petrus Plancius | Left–right is north–south. | |
| 1681 | Robert Knox | | |
| 17th century; after 1681 | Nicolaes Visscher II | | |
| 1686 | Alain Manesson Mallet | | |
| 17th century | Robert Morden | | |
| 1789 | | | |
| late-19th century | | | |
| c. 1914 | | | |

=== Small-scale maps ===
Sortable table
| Date | Title | Carto- grapher | Description | Image |
|---|---|---|---|---|
| 1815 | Sketch map of Kandy and environ in 1815 | | | |
| 1914 | Map of Kandy and environs | | | |
