= Bernero =

Bernero is an Italian surname that may refer to

- Adam Bernero (born 1976), American baseball pitcher
- Edward Allen Bernero (born 1962), American television writer, producer, and director
- Giovanni Battista Bernero (1736–1796), Italian sculptor
- Virgil Bernero (born 1964), American politician

== See also ==
- 16051 Bernero, a minor planet
