= Nicolaus Germanus =

German cartographer (c. 1420 – c. 1490)

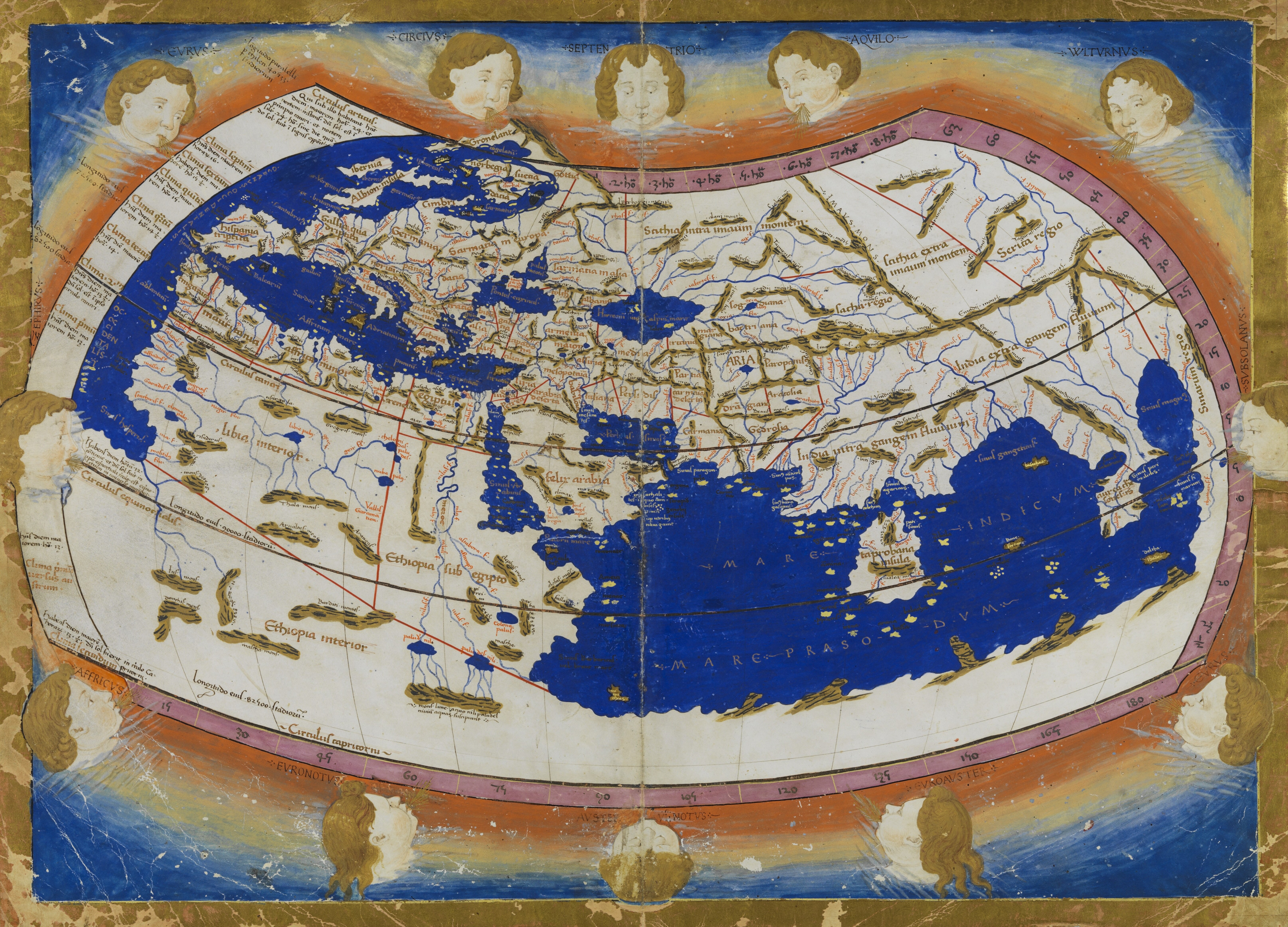
Nicolaus Germanus's 1467 manuscript copy of Ptolemy's world map, displaying Nicolaus Germanus's form of Ptolemy's 2nd projection and the expanded knowledge of Scandinavia in the northwest

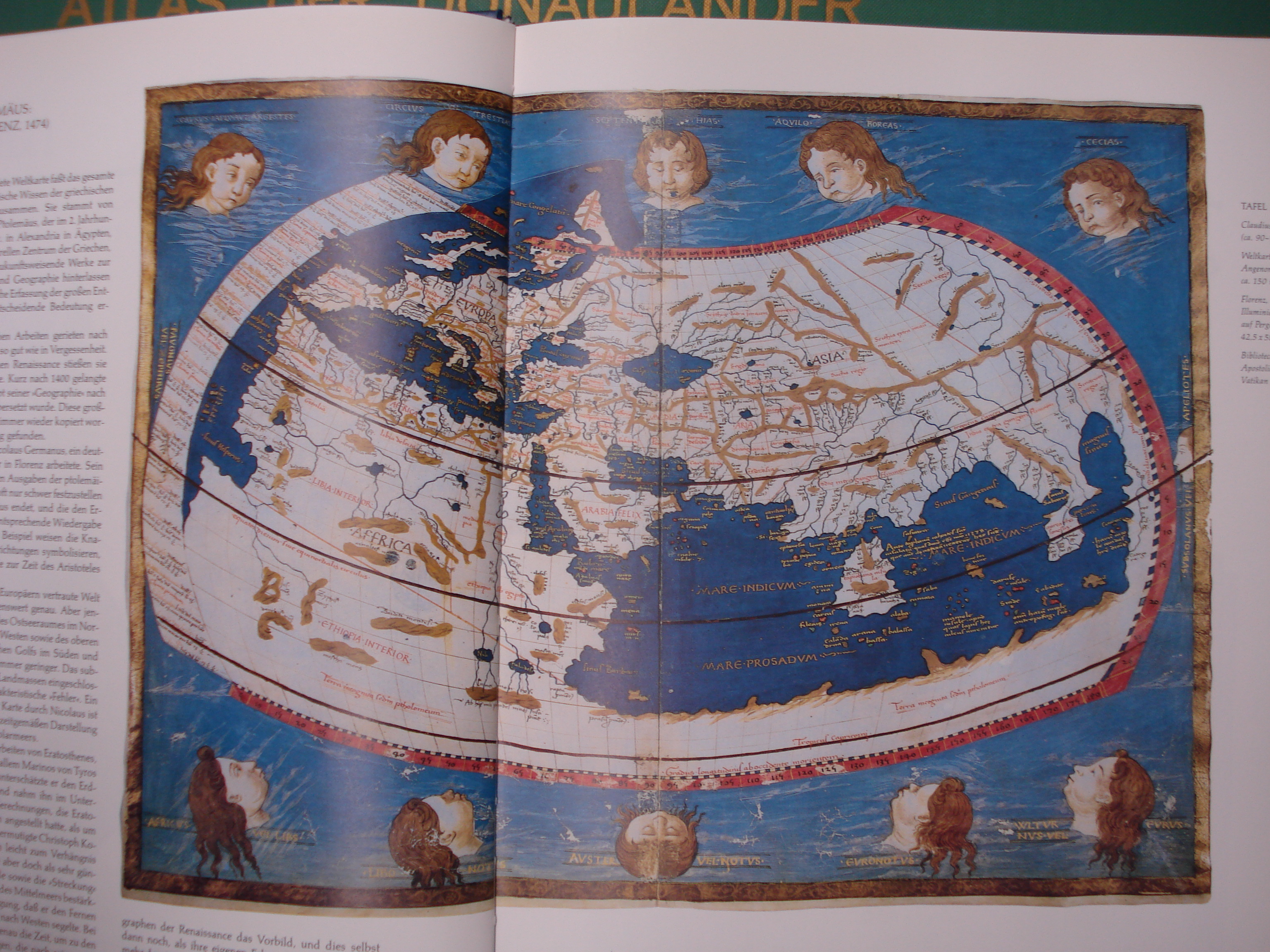
A modern book illustration of the world map in the Ulm Ptolemy

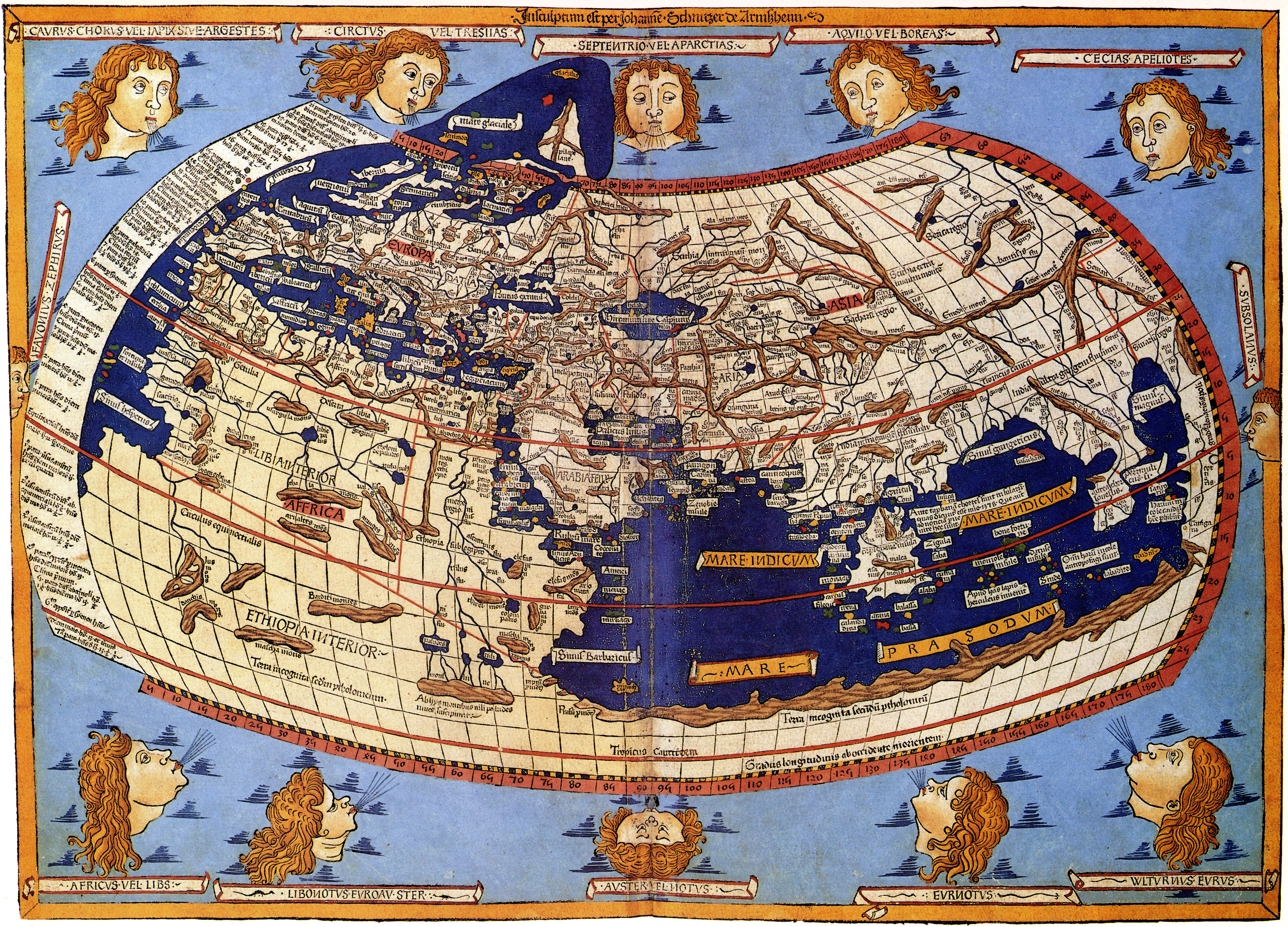
Johannes Schnitzer's world map from Holle's 1482 edition of Ptolemy's Geography

Nicolaus Germanus (c. 1420 – c. 1490) was a German cartographer who modernized Ptolemy's Geography by applying new projections, adding additional maps, and contributing other innovations that were influential in the development of Renaissance cartography.

== Name ==
In the fifteenth century it was common for scholars and artisans to adopt a Latinized version of their birth name. Nicolaus Germanus is the Latin form of the name "Nicholas the German". His full birth name is unknown. His name is sometimes preceded by "Donnus" or "Donus", an abbreviated form of the Latin title Dominus ("Lord" or "Master").

== Life ==
Nothing is known about the early life of Nicolaus Germanus. He first appears in the records of the Reichenbach Priory (now in Baden-Württemberg) where he was prior of the Benedictine monastery in 1442. It appears that he was trained in cosmography around 1460 and arrived in Italy by 1464. He lived first in Florence where he compiled astrological tables and produced his first revision of Ptolemy's Geography in 1466. He later moved to Rome where he created a pair of globes and a world map for the Vatican Library in 1477. He continued to prepare updates and revisions of Ptolemy's atlas for several years. The last contemporary record of his activity comes from a fellow German scholar, Conrad Celtes, who met him in Florence and wrote that Nicolaus complained bitterly about others getting the glory and profit for his work.

== Works ==
=== Ptolemy's Geographia ===
Nicolaus Germanus was an influential figure in the modernization and popularization of Ptolemy's Geographia. At least fifteen manuscript copies of Geographia were authored by Germanus or immediately copied from his work. Except for the 1482 Florence edition, all versions printed in the fifteenth century were based on his manuscripts.

Scholars group his manuscripts into three recensions (versions), roughly based on the number of maps included and the type of map projection used. His first recension (ca. 1460 to 1466) contains only the original twenty-seven Ptolemaic maps (tabulae antiquae) drawn using a trapezoid projection of which Germanus claimed to be the author. In the so-called "Donis projection", latitude is reflected by parallel lines while longitude lines converge towards the pole. This recension served as the basis for the Rome edition of Geographia printed in 1478 and reprinted in 1490. Henricus Martellus Germanus also adopted the trapezoid projection in 1480 for his manuscript version of Geographia.

The second recension (1466 to 1468) includes the twenty-seven tabulae antiquae and three new maps (tabulae modernae) covering northern Europe, Spain and France. His representation of the Scandinavian region, including Iceland and Greenland, reflected a more accurate depiction provided by Danish cartographer Claudius Clavus. The world map in this recension was drawn using the homeotheric projection which Ptolemy called superior but more difficult to construct. This recension was the basis for the Ulm edition printed in 1482 and 1486 in Ulm. It was the first edition of Geographia to be printed north of the Alps and the first atlas to be colored in-house prior to sale. It was printed using woodcuts prepared by Johannes de Armsheim who first introduced the practice of engravers signing their maps.

His last recension (1468 to 1482) added two more maps depicting Italy and Palestine and extended the world map to include northern Europe, although his placement of Iceland and Greenland were notably less accurate than his previous portrayal. Printed in 1482, Berlinghieri's Geographia uses a mix of maps from this recension and earlier ones.

The 1482 editions of Ulm and Berlinghieri contain the first modern maps (derived from Germanus) to appear in print. Germanus introduced other cartographic innovations including the use of dots or circles to mark the exact position of localities and dotted lines to indicate frontiers.

=== Globes ===
In 1477, Nicolaus Germanus created a terrestrial and a celestial globe for inclusion in the new Vatican Library. Germanus was paid 200 ducats for the globes and an additional seven ducats to add the papal coat of arms and provide two covers. The globes were listed in an inventory of 1481 and kept in the Salle Pontifica until they were lost during the sack of Rome in 1527. The earth globe is the earliest documented modern globe and preceded the extant Behaim's globe by fifteen years.

=== Astrology ===
Nicolaus Germanus was also a competent astrologer. In 1466 while in Florence, he prepared an astrological table for the Duke Borso d'Este which demonstrated his ability to calculate the positions of the planets for several years into the future. In Rome he prepared a similar astrological table for Pope Paul II.
