= Casale Monferrato Cathedral =

Roman Catholic church in Casale Monferrato, Italy

Coordinates: 45.1373°N 8.4527°E

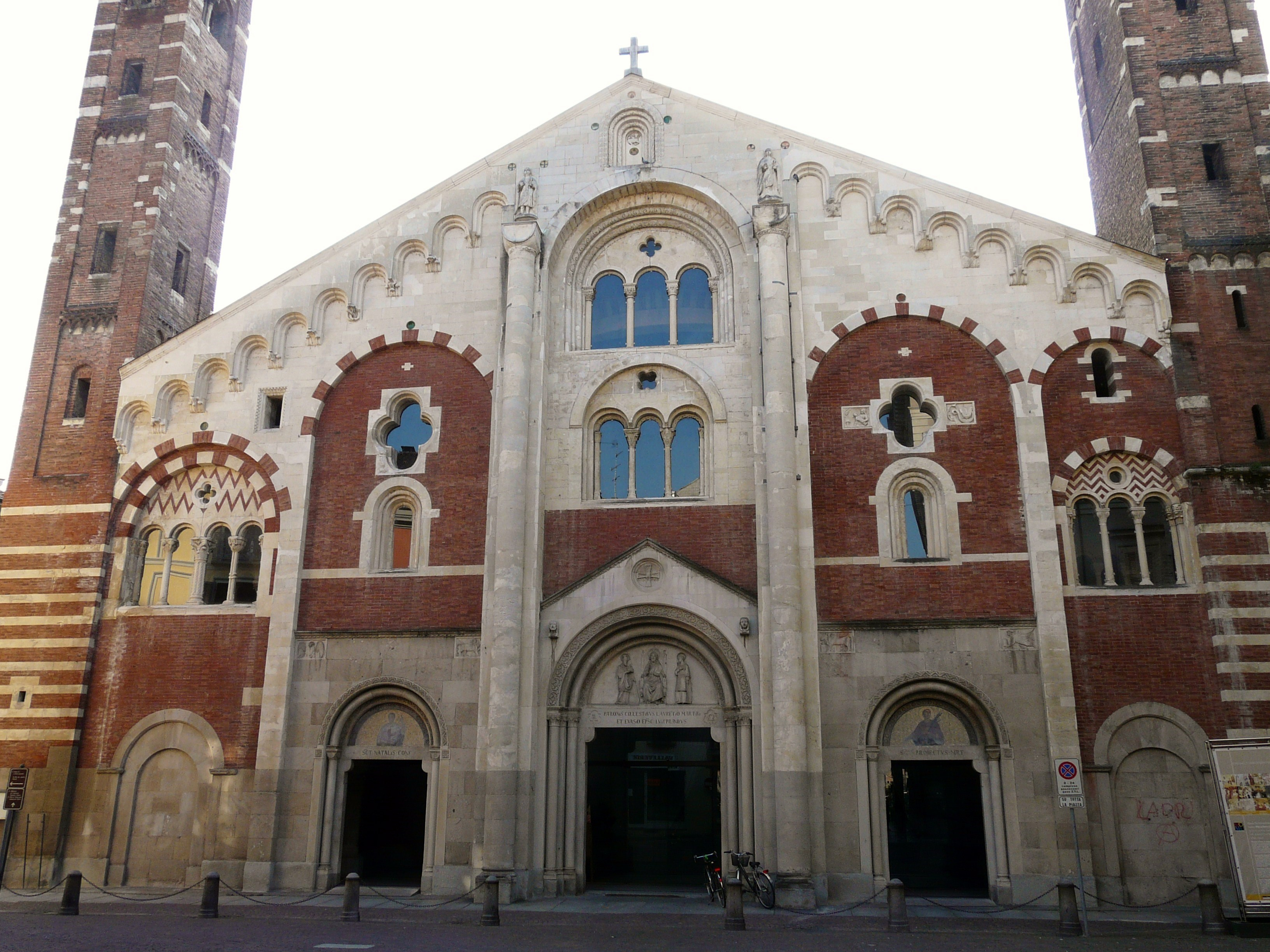
West front and bell towers

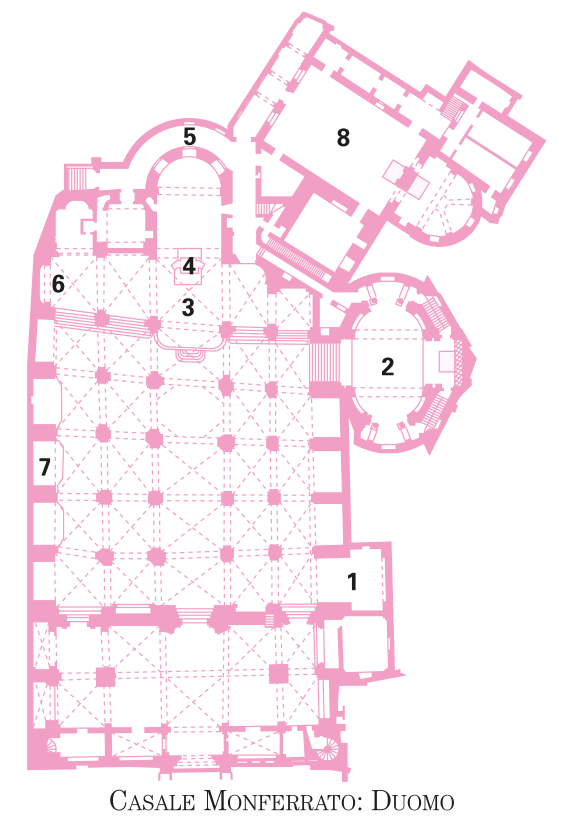
Casale Monferrato. The Cathedral of S. Evasio. (1) First right chapel. (2) Chapel of S. Evasio. (3) Crucifix. (4) High altar. (5) Ambulatory. (6) Tomb of S. Bernardino Tibaldeschi-Orsini. (7) Third left chapel. (8) Sacristy.

Casale Monferrato Cathedral (Italian: Duomo di Casale Monferrato; Cattedrale di Sant'Evasio) is a Roman Catholic cathedral in Casale Monferrato, province of Alessandria, Piedmont, Italy, dedicated to Saint Evasius. It is the episcopal seat of the Diocese of Casale Monferrato.

== History and description ==
The present Romanesque and Gothic structure was first consecrated in 1107 or 1108, but a previous church from the 9th century stood on the site.

The cathedral has a narthex. The interior has five naves, of which the central one is marked by tall polychrome columns rising two storeys. The ceilings are frescoed, sometimes sky blue.

On the south, the first chapel houses an 18th-century marble statuary group depicting the Ecstasy of Mary Magdalen by Giovanni Battista Bernero. A small column monogrammed with the sign of Christ is the spot where the town's patron saint, Evasius, was martyred. Tradition maintains that if someone puts his or her ear to the column, it is possible to hear the blood of the saint flowing.

The south arm of the transept opens onto the elliptical Chapel of Saint Evasius (1793), a Baroque feature which houses the relics of the saint in a silver statue, restored despite looting. The apse of the cathedral has an 11th-century crucifix. The ceiling of the apse was frescoed by Costantino Sereno, depicting Christ in Glory with Angels.

Behind the church is a museum of religious artworks.
