= Vittorio Amedeo Cignaroli =

Italian painter and architect

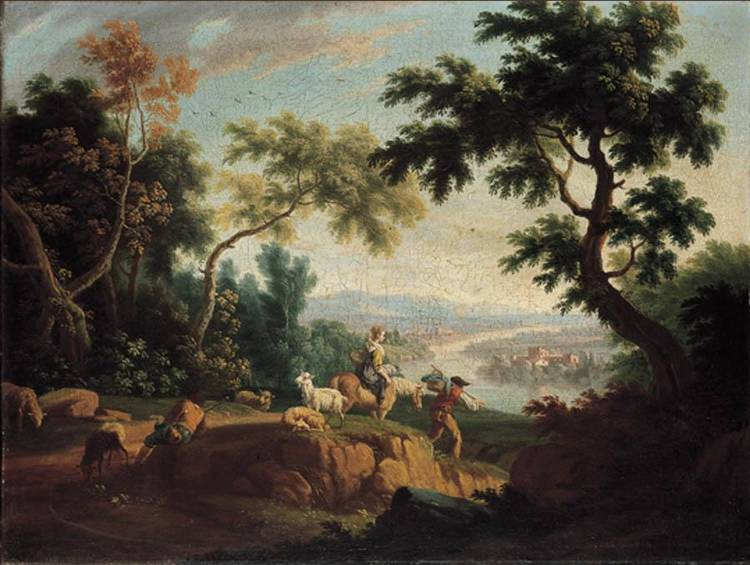
Landscape with Wayfarers

Vittorio Amedeo Cignaroli (1730–1800) was an Italian painter and architect. He was the grandson of Martino Cignaroli.

== Biography ==
He was born in Turin, and is described as a painter of landscapes and history. He was active during 1778–1793. He married the daughter of the French sculptor La Datte, who had been a member of the French Academy and author of the ossuary of the chapel of Sacra Sindone. Vittorio worked for the King of Sardinia, and in 1782, Victor Amadeus III of Sardinia named him painter of landscapes and wooded scenes for the King. Many of his paintings were present in the Royal Palace and Castle of the Venaria Reale; at the Palace of Stupinigi, he painted four large hunting scenes. For the Castle of Moncalieri, he painted the four stations. His daughter married the painter Gaetano Perego.
