= Claudius Clavus =

Danish geographer (1388–?)

Geography by Ptolemy, Latin manuscript of the early 15th century, with maps by Claudius Clavus

Claudius Clavus (Suartho) also known as Nicholas Niger, (Danish: Claudius Claussøn Swart), (born 14 September 1388), was a Danish geographer sometimes considered to be the first Nordic cartographer.

It is believed that he was born in the village of Salling on the Danish island of Funen. He is commemorated by a plaque in the local Aagaarden.

In 1412–13 at the age of 25 he started to travel around Europe and appeared eleven years later (1423–24) in Rome. It is believed he travelled as far north as the 70°10' N. lat. In Rome he became friends with the cardinal Giordano Orsini and the pope's secretary Gian Francesco Poggio Bracciolini, who were among those working to update the old Roman cartography. Claudius contributed to a more realistic description of Nordic countries, in particular Iceland and Greenland, and was probably the first cartographer to put Greenland on a map. He is also known for having named Greenlandic places by using lyrics from old folk songs.

Most of his work (including two maps) is lost, but a copy has been preserved through the German cartographers Donnus Nicholas Germanus and Henricus Martellus Germanus, and in the nineteenth century more texts were rediscovered in the imperial library at Vienna. He drew 27 maps for a copy of the Geography by Ptolemy (see image).
