= Scipione Cignaroli =

Italian painter

Scipione Cignaroli (1715–1766) was an Italian painter.

== Life ==
The son of Martino Cignaroli, he received his first instruction from his father, and then went to Rome, where he became a scholar of Tempesta. He was a successful imitator of the style of his master, and of the works of Gaspard Dughet and Salvator Rosa. His pictures are chiefly at Milan and Turin.
