= Ignazio Collino =

Italian artist

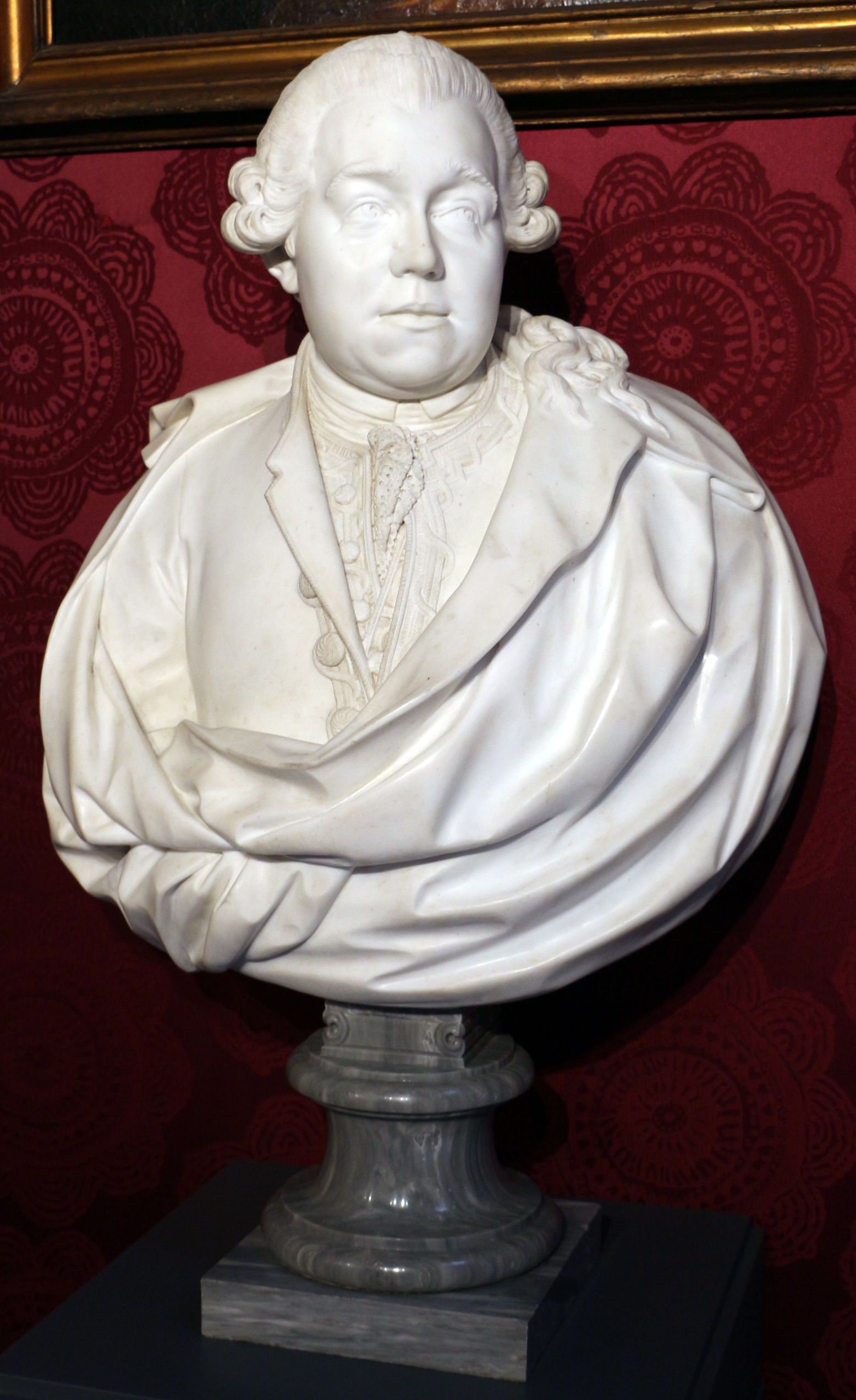
Ignazio and Filippo Collino, Francesco Alerano Saverio Provana del Sabbione

Ignazio Collino (1724–1793) was an Italian sculptor, active in the late-Baroque period, mainly in the region of the Piedmont.

== Biography ==
Collino was born in Turin. Up to the age of 14, he worked under his father, Damẻ, from whom he learned wood carving. Along with his brother, Filippo Collino (ca 1737–1800), Ignazio worked in a restrained formal style, intermediate between Baroque and Neoclassicism. He went to apprentice with the bronze sculptor François Ladotte (Francois Ladatte) and in drawing with Claudio Francesco Beaumont in 1744. With Ladotte, he completed a Saint Sebastian.

A royal subsidy provided by Carlo Emanuele III of Savoy in 1750 enabled him to go to Rome. He was there in 1754 at work with fellow-Lombard Giovanni Battista Maini, who was a trainee of Camillo Rusconi. In Rome, he copied many antique originals, including busts of the Emperor Marcus Aurelius, of Faustina, and of a Vestal.

In 1755 he completed in Carrara Marble, the sculptural group of Papirus and his mother, then a Niobe. He completed the four statues, Justice, Strength. Beneficence and Charity. He appointed in 1760 a member of the Accademia di San Luca in Rome. In 1763, he was appointed sculptor of the king after sending four bas-reliefs sent to the court of Turin.

In 1767, they relocated back to Turin to run the school of sculpture. He provided much sculpture for royal tombs of the House of Savoy at the Basilica of Superga, including the Monument for Carlo Emanuele III (1773). In Turin he founded a school of sculpture, Giovanni Battista Bernero was one of his pupils.

His brother Philip completed statues for the elegant fountain in the castle of Agliè: a statue of Pallas for the Royal palace of Turin and the statues of Vittorio Amadeo II and Charles Emmanuel III, in Carrara marble six feet tall, for the university of Turin. He also helped complete the royal tombs for the king of Sardinia, in the church of Superga, and finally the colossal statue of St. Agabus in Novara.
