= Anna Caterina Gilli =

Italian artist

Anna Caterina Gilli (bef. 1729 – bef. 1820), was an Italian painter, active in Turin between 1729 and 1751. Her name is sometimes given as Gili or Gillia.

Little is known of Gilli's life and career save that she was active as a decorative artist for the Royal Palace of Turin and the Palazzina di caccia of Stupinigi; her work has been described as similar to that of Michele Antonio Rapos. She was most likely dead by 1820, when two still-lives of fruit in pastel were ascribed to a "Rosa Gilli, Torinese" at a local exhibition of work by deceased artists.
