= Martino Cignaroli =

Italian painter

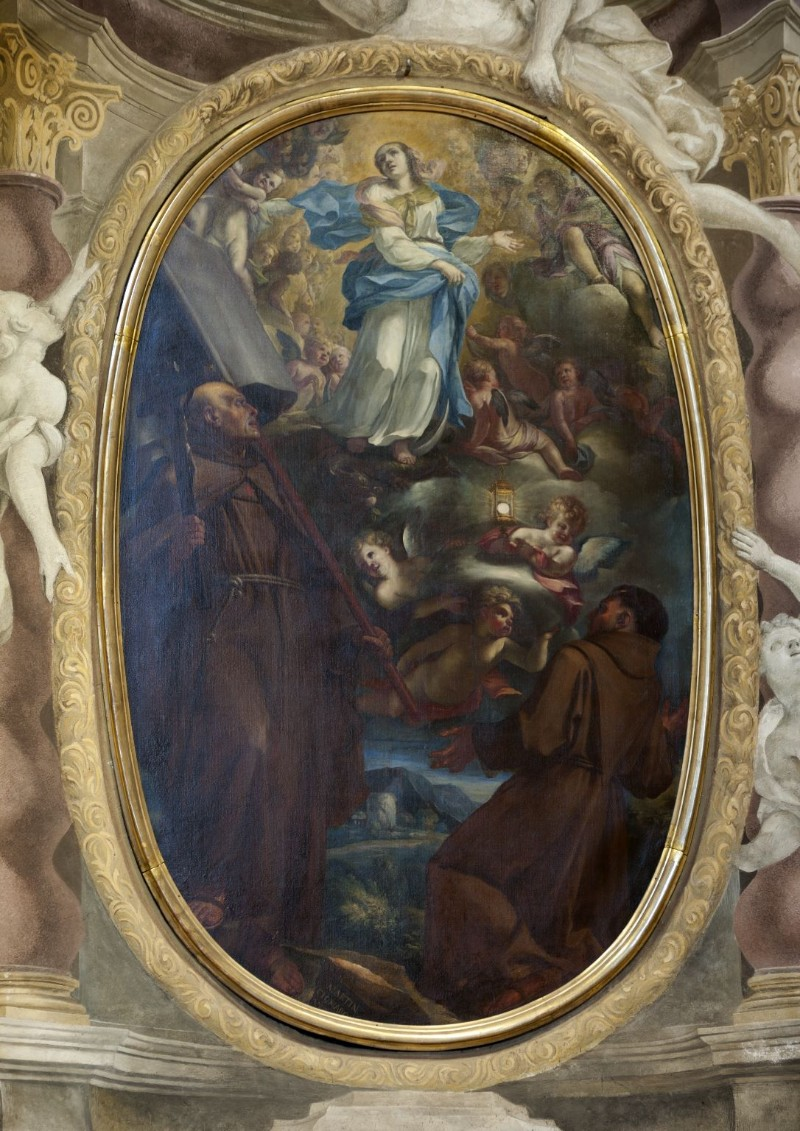

Martino Cignaroli (1649 – 10 January 1726) was an Italian painter of the Baroque period. He was the elder son of Giambettino Cignaroli's uncle.

== Biography ==
Also called il Veronese, he was born and studied in Verona with Giulio Carpioni. He mainly painted both religious frescoes and landscapes. His landscapes are described as populated with small figures in a Flemish style. He worked in Crema and Milan, until 1714 when he was asked to paint for the court of the King of Sardinia, then in Turin. He travelled there with Scipione.

His Cignaroli family line produced over a dozen artists and artisans. Martino's son Scipione became a pupil of Pieter Mulier II (Cavalier Tempesta). Martino's grandson, Vittorio Amedeo Cignaroli (1730–1800), was a known landscape painter for the House of Savoy in Turin. Martino's great grandson Angelo Cignaroli, was a painter of veduta, died in 1842. Another pupil of Martino was Giovanni Murari.
