= Nicolaus Laurentii =

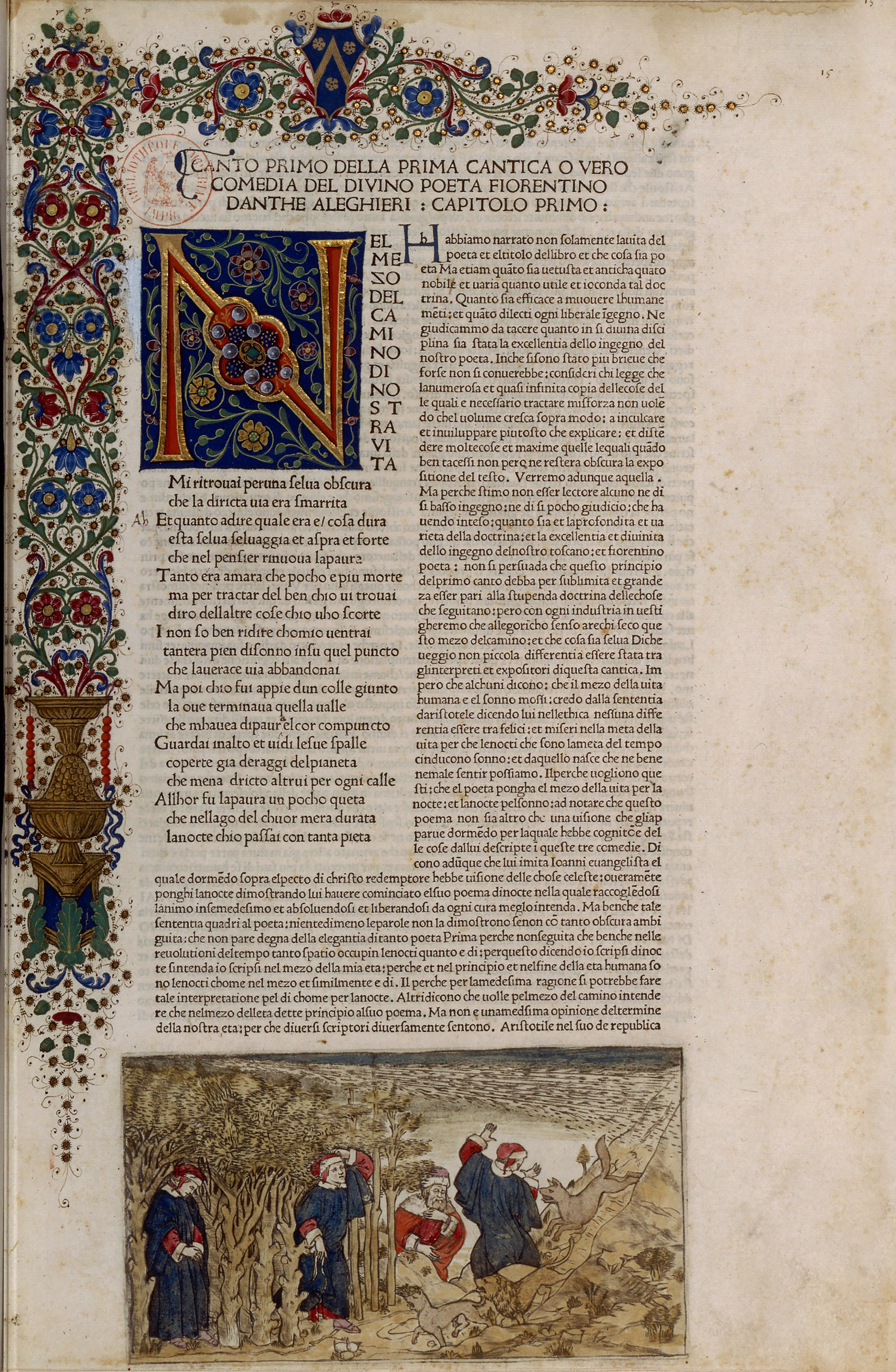
Page from the edition of The Divine Comedy with commentary by Cristoforo Landino printed by Nicolaus Laurentii in 1481. This particular copy includes a dedication by Cristoforo Landino to Bernardo Bembo. Bibliothèque Nationale de France

Nicolaus Laurentii (fl. 1475–1486) is the Latin form of the name of Niccolò di Lorenzo, also known as Niccolò Todesco ("Nicholas the German"). He was a German printer who lived in Florence, Italy in the late fifteenth century. He was among the first printers to use copper plate engravings and printed a number of works of importance to the Italian Renaissance.

== Biography ==
Laurentii moved to Florence from Wrocław (today Poland). He worked with Johannes Petri of Mainz in a nunnery of the Dominican Order. The sisters there served as compositors and printers.

Among the works printed by Laurentii are Cristoforo Landino's commentary to The Divine Comedy by Dante Alighieri (1481) and the Septe Giornate della Geographia di Francesco Berlinghieri by Francesco Berlinghieri, which was one of the first printed works based upon Ptolemy's Geographica.

== Works printed ==
Nicolaus Laurentii's printed works include:

- Marsilio Ficino, De christiana religione (1476)
- Antonio Bettini, Monte Santo di Dio (1477)
- Aulus Cornelius Celsus, De medicina (1478)
- Dante Alighieri, La Commedia (1481)
- Francesco Berlinghieri, Septe Giornate della Geographia di Francesco Berlinghieri (1482)
- Leon Battista Alberti, De Re Aedificatoria (1485)
