= Palazzina di caccia of Stupinigi =

- Palazzina di caccia di Stupinigi
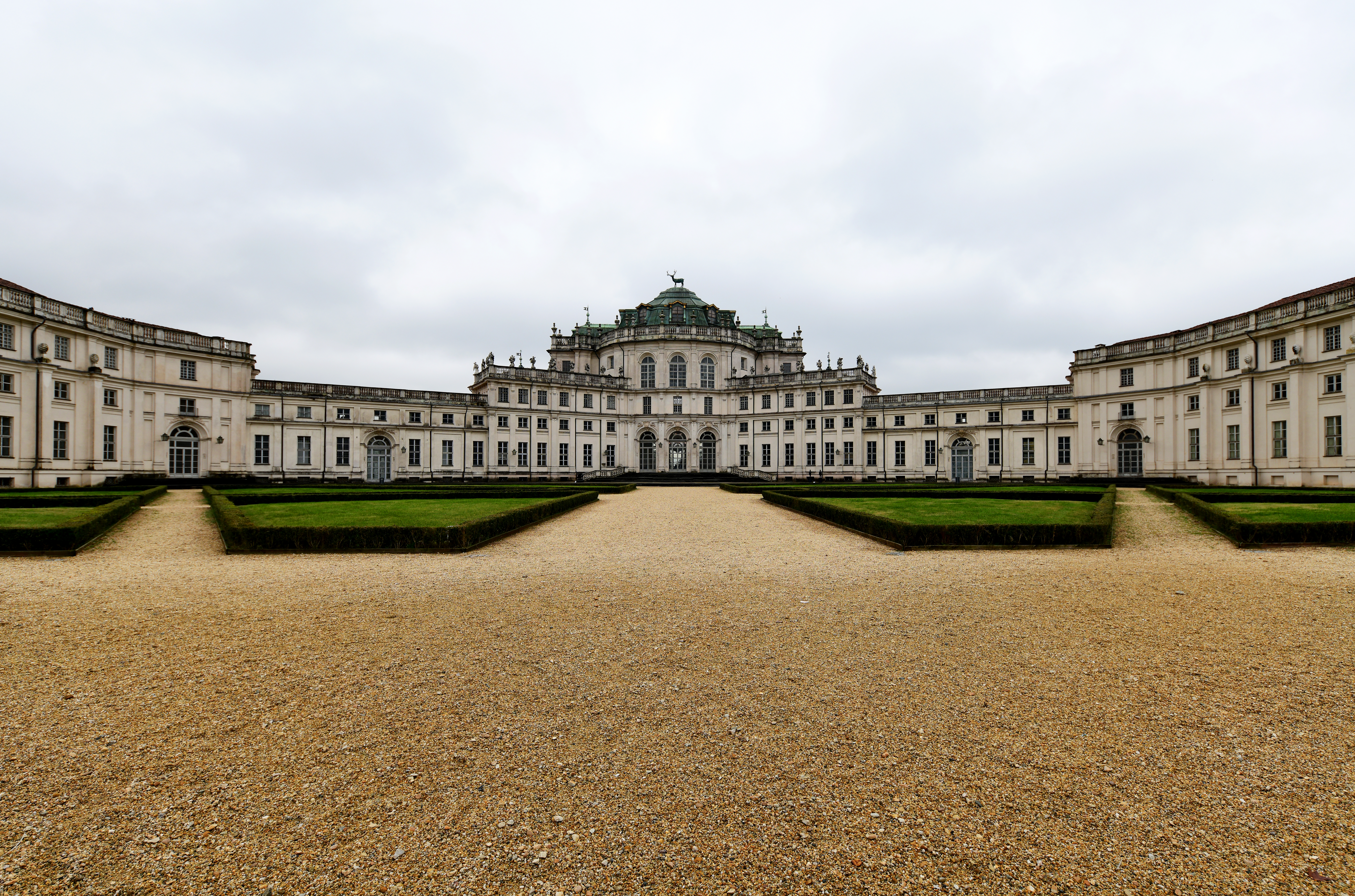
- Façade of the palace

- Location within Piedmont Location within Italy

General information
- Coordinates: 44°59′42″N 7°36′14″E

UNESCO World Heritage Site
- Criteria: (i)(ii)(iv)(v)
- Reference: 823bis

The Palazzina di caccia of Stupinigi (Italian for 'hunting residence' of Stupinigi) is one of the Residences of the Royal House of Savoy in the Metropolitan City of Turin in northern Italy, part of the UNESCO World Heritage Sites list. Built as a royal hunting lodge in the early 18th century, it is located in Stupinigi, a suburb (italian frazione) of the town of Nichelino, 10 km (6 mi) southwest of Turin.

== History ==
The original castle was owned until 1418 by the Acaja line of the House of Savoy, Lords of Piedmont, and it was sold to Marquis Rolando Pallavicino in 1493. It was then acquired by Emmanuel Philibert in 1563, when the ducal capital was moved from Chambéry to Turin.

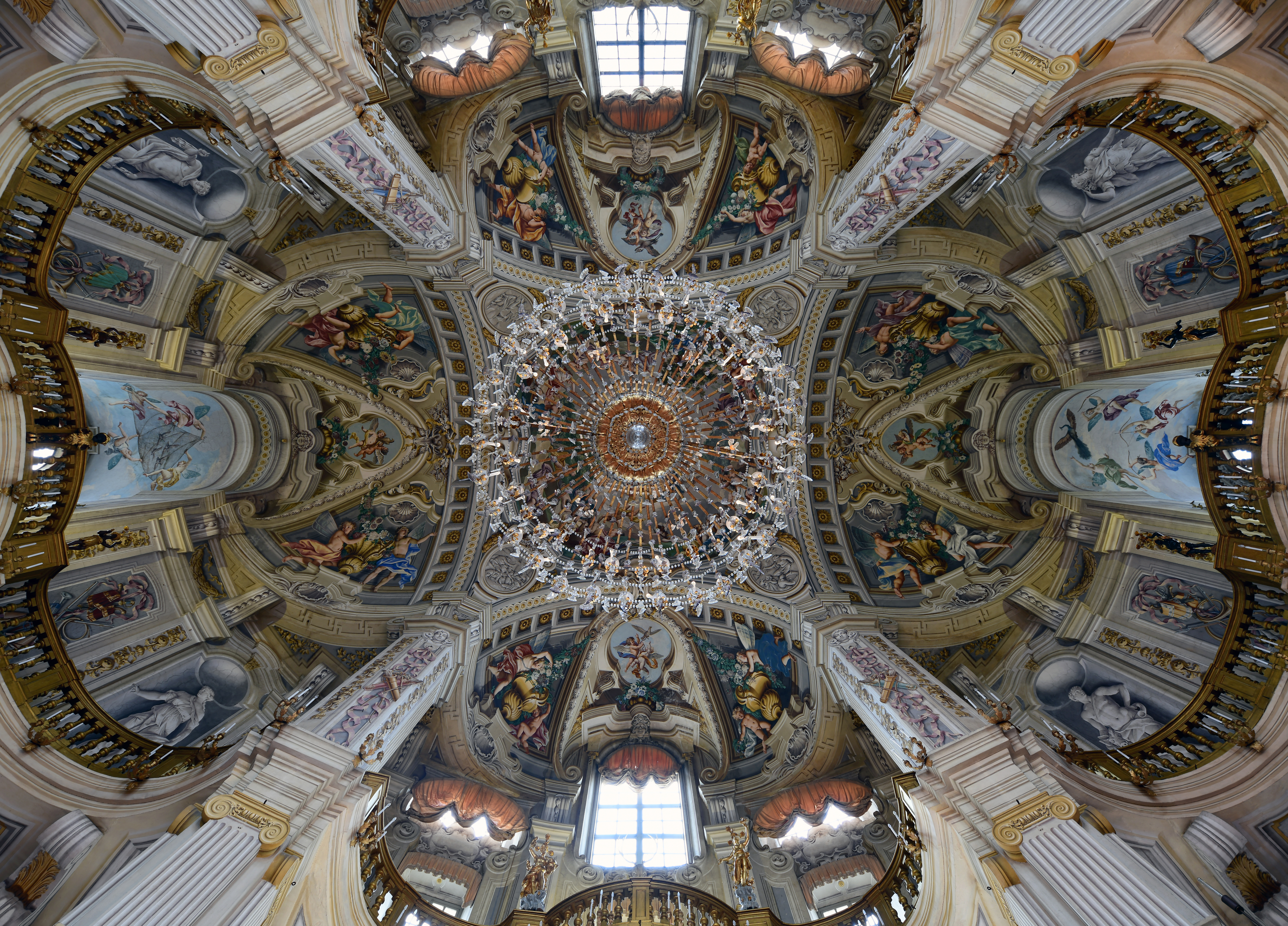
Detail of the vaulting of the Central Hall

The new palace was designed by the architect Filippo Juvarra to be used as a palazzina di caccia ('hunting residence') for Victor Amadeus II, King of Sardinia. Works started in 1729. Within two years, construction was far enough advanced for the first formal hunt to take place in 1731.

Juvarra called upon a team of decorators, many of them from Venice, to carry out the decor of the interiors. During the reigns of Charles Emmanuel III and Victor Amadeus III, the palazzina and its formal park continued to be extended, at first by Juvarra's assistant, Giovanni Tommaso Prunotto, then by numerous North Italian architects, such as Ignazio Birago di Borgaro, Ludovico Bo, Ignazio Bertola and Benedetto Alfieri. The final building has a total of 137 rooms and 17 galleries, and covers 31,050 square meters. Polissena of Hesse-Rotenburg, wife of Charles Emmanuel III, also carried out improvements.

The original purpose of the hunting lodge is symbolized by the bronze stag perched at the apex of the stepped roof of its central dome, and the hounds' heads that decorate the vases on the roofline. The building has a saltire plan – four angled wings project from the oval-shaped main hall. The extensions resulted in separate pavilions linked by long angled galleries and a long octagonal forecourt enclosed by wings, extended forward into two further entrance courts.

Stupinigi was the preferred building to be used for celebrations and dynastic weddings by members of the House of Savoy. Here, in 1773, Princess Maria Theresa of Savoy, married Charles Philippe, Count of Artois, brother of Louis XVI and the future Charles X of France.

Today, the Palace of Stupinigi houses the Museo di Arte e Ammobiliamento, a museum of the arts and furnishings, some original to the palazzina, others brought from the former Savoy family residences of Moncalieri Castle and the Palace of Venaria. Stupinigi has the most important collection of Piedmontese furniture, including works by Turin's three most famous Royal cabinet-makers – Giuseppe Maria Bonzanigo, Pietro Piffetti and Luigi Prinotti. Some of the sculptures of hunting figures are by Giovanni Battista Bernero. Additionally, temporary exhibitions are held in its galleries, such as the Mostra del Barocco (1963).

Anna Caterina Gilli was active as a decorative painter at the palace.

== Description ==
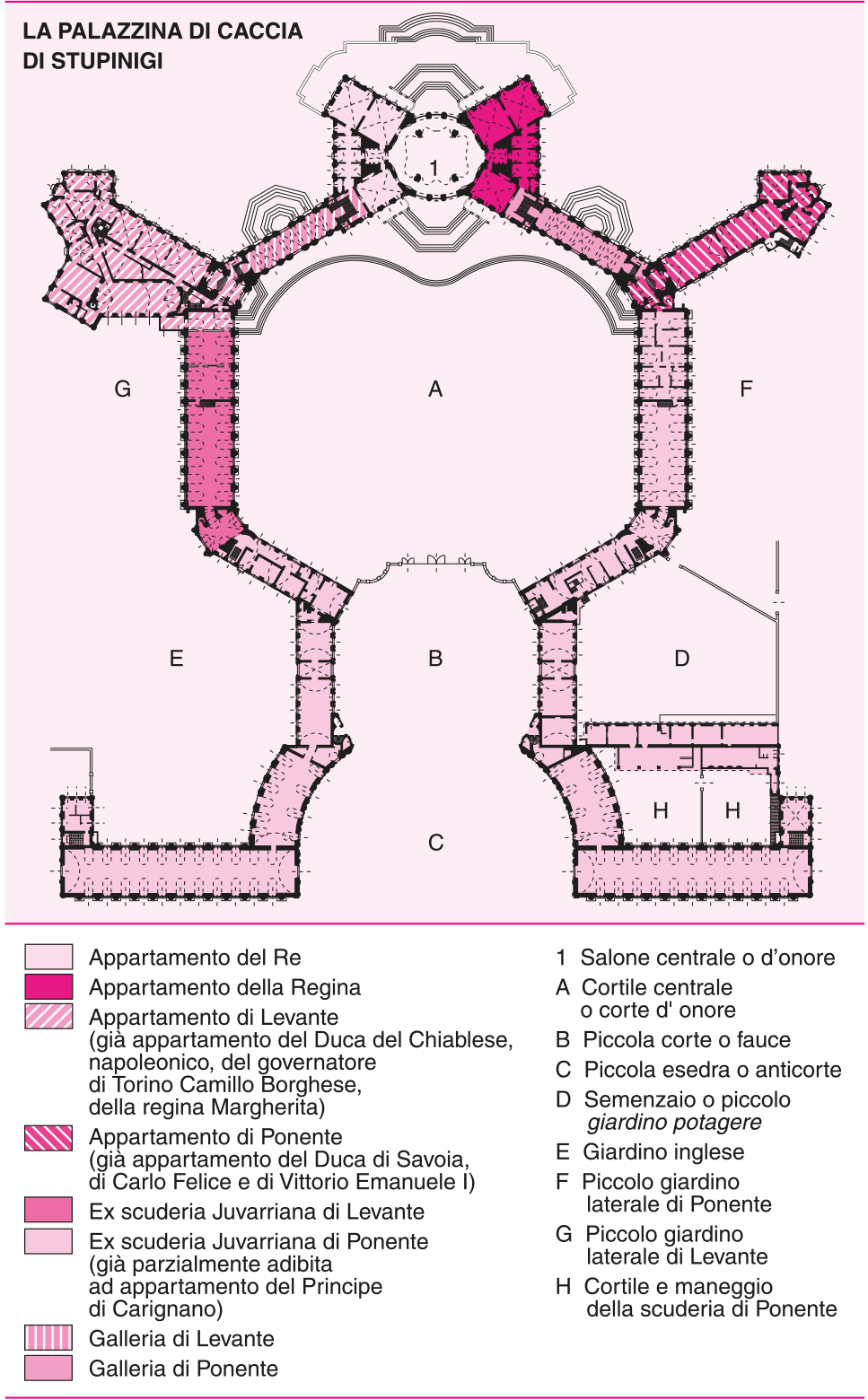
Plan of the palace

The plan of the building is defined by the four arms of St. Andrew's Cross, divided by the central axis that is aligned with the path that leads from Turin to the palace through a tree-lined avenue that runs alongside farms, stables and other old dependencies of the building.

The core nucleus consists of a large central oval hall from which the four wings depart, which includes the royal apartments and those for guests. The large double-height oval hall with balconies concave-convex, is covered by a dome surmounted by the statue of the "Cervo", by Francesco Ladatte. With the departure of Juvarra from Turin, King Charles Emmanuel III entrusted the direction of the work to Giovanni Tommaso Prunotto, who provided for the expansion of the building starting from the sketches left by Juvarra, thus trying to safeguard the complex play of lights and shapes. The interior is in Italian Rococo, made of precious materials such as lacquers, porcelains, gilded stuccos, mirrors and roots that today extend on an area of about 31,000 square meters, while 14,000 are occupied by adjacent buildings, 150,000 by the park and 3,800 by the external flowerbeds; Overall, there are 137 rooms and 17 galleries. Among the fine furniture made for the building should be mentioned that of the carver Giuseppe Maria Bonzanigo, Pietro Piffetti and Luigi Prinotto. The building preserves decorations by the Venetian painters Giuseppe and Domenico Valeriani, by Gaetano Perego, and by the Viennese Christan Wehrlin. The frescoes by Vittorio Amedeo Cignaroli, Gian Battista Crosato and Carlo Andrea Van Loo are also noteworthy.

=== Entrance ===
The entrance to the complex gives access to the vast area of the Galleria dei Ritratti (Portrait Gallery), which was part of the side stables designed and built by Filippo Juvarra after the completion of the central complex of the building. This space was therefore used for the carriages and coaches and to house horses during the hunts. Here today stands the original statue of Stupinigi's deer, created by Francesco Ladatte in 1766, which overlooks the dome of the central hall. It was placed in this room in 1992, and the top of the dome was replaced with a modern bronze copy. The sculpture is surrounded by carved wooden bas-relief portraits commissioned by Victor Emmanuel II and originally intended for the Moncalieri Castle. In the first library and then in the second library one can find the change of taste in the mid-eighteenth century when the stables area was reduced to make room for a library sandwiched with shelves designed by Benedetto Alfieri and painted in blue, ivory and gold, accompanied by allegories of the arts and sciences painted by Giuseppe Nogari.

=== Apartment of the Duke of Chiablese ===
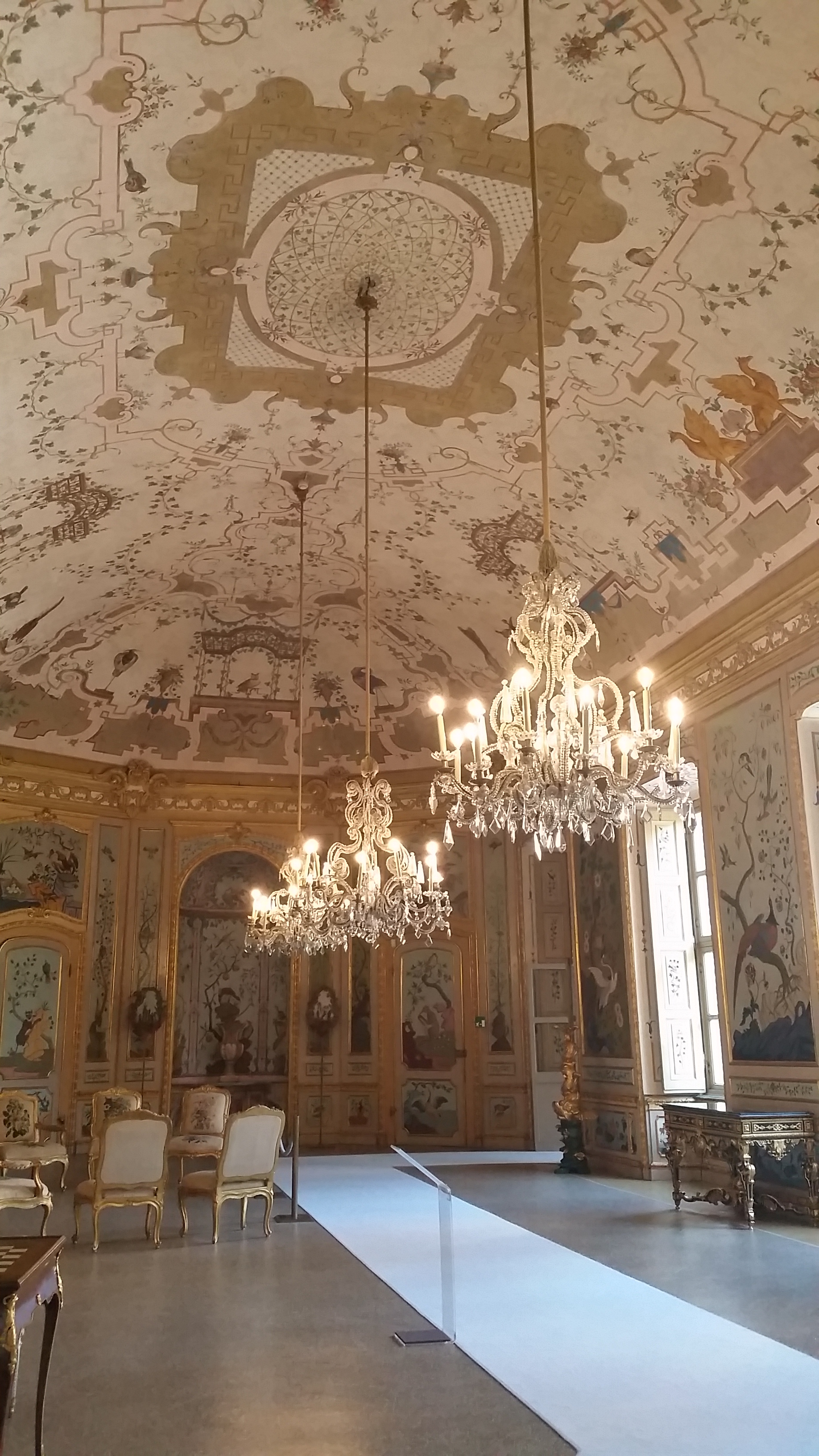
Gambling hall

Also called "Appartamento di Levante" (as opposed to the specular Appartamento di Ponente), the set of rooms was enlarged under the direction of Benedetto Alfieri in the 18th century to accommodate the rooms of Prince Benedetto, Duke of Chablais, son of King Charles Emmanuel III.

==== Gambling hall ====
The room of greater consistency for size and style in the apartments of the Duke of Chiablese is undoubtedly the gambling hall, a large space intended for the leisure of the court, inserted into a rectangular hall with rounded corners and two large niches on the sides, shorter. The ceiling, decorated by Giovanni Pietro Pozzo in 1765, incorporates the same exotic and oriental motifs of the walls that play the role of an elegant frame for the game furniture inside the room: a mid-eighteenth century drawing room, a Louis XV style game table with a precious chessboard inlaid with ebony and ivory, as well as a desk with refined ivory figures inlaid from the beginning of the 18th century. Noteworthy are also the chinoiserie and the porcelain present in this environment that are well suited to the exotic decoration of the complex.

==== Hall of Mirrors and Cabinet of Pauline Bonaparte ====
The first room, decorated with a very special rococo style, is decorated with stucco and mirrors from the walls to the ceiling, designed by Giovanni Pietro Pozzo in 1766 with the help of Michele Antonio Rapous in the realization of the boiserie. The chandelier, dating back to the 1940s, is more ancient and is decorated with sculptures of wrought iron birds. The Cabinet of Pauline Bonaparte owes its fame to the fact that it was made to equip in current forms by Pauline Bonaparte, Napoleon's sister, during her period of stay at the palace when her husband Camillo Borghese was appointed governor of Piedmont. The room, small in size, contains a beautiful marble bathtub, decorated with bas-reliefs representing the imperial insignia with the Napoleonic eagle.

=== Central Hall ===
The central hall, the core of the building, was the first idea of Juvarra to be completed and the focus around which its entire building complex was developed. The room consists of a large oval-shaped room culminating in a dome enclosed by a vaulted ceiling. The hall was completed in 1730, and on 10 February 1731, the king commissioned to the Bolognese brothers Giuseppe and Domenico Valeriani a large fresco on the vault, depicting the Triumph of Diana, the classic goddess of hunting that appears between the clouds, above a celestial chariot overlooking woods. Around there are also putti with game or wreaths of flowers, flanked by nymphs. At the apex of the four pillars that support the dome of the hall, just below the large fresco, there are four monochromatic medallions representing similar episodes related to the same deity. The works for the realization of such frescoes began already on 8 March, ending in 1733. Juvarra imposed a quadrature scheme on the two brothers so as not to ruin his complex overall design.

==== Frescoes of the upper vault ====
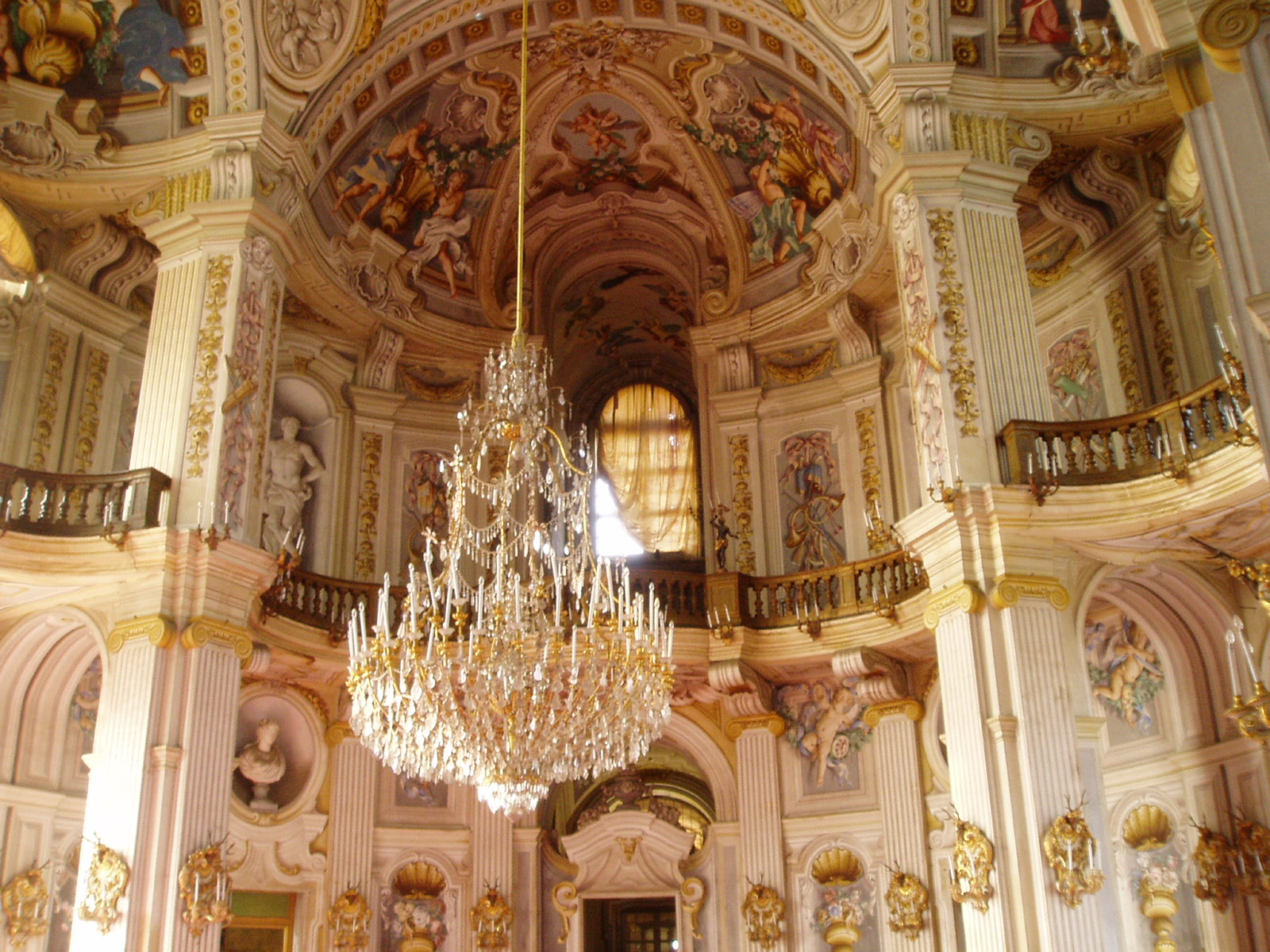
The Central Hall

After Juvarra left, his idea to place large sculptural groups of dogs and deer in the large windows of the salon was abandoned, so as not to excessively limit the splendid perspective view that is still enjoyed looking outwards. The project was entrusted to Giuseppe Marocco, who envisioned the thirty-six wooden fans (appliques) with deer heads that show off themselves on the walls of the hall. From the same period are the gilded wood inlays of the balustrade of the singers in the upper part of the hall and the paracamels painted by the Lombard Giovanni Crivelli (1733). Also worthy of note are the four marble busts made in 1773 by Giovanni Battista Bernero, which overlook the same number of entrances to the hall and which represent minor divinities linked to hunting and the fields: Ceres, Pomona, Naiad and Napea.

The salon, steeped in its structure and in the decorations characteristic of the eighteenth century, also attracted the attention of several contemporaries who were able to see it personally as the French engraver Charles-Nicolas Cochin, who however criticized the superabundance of decorations and excessive eccentricity. Of the same opinion was Jérôme Lalande, who reported how the Juvarra was almost completely focused on the salon, leaving behind all the rest and revealing how it was arranged as the "dream of an architect", too risky for a city palace and only for a sumptuous country residence.

== The park ==
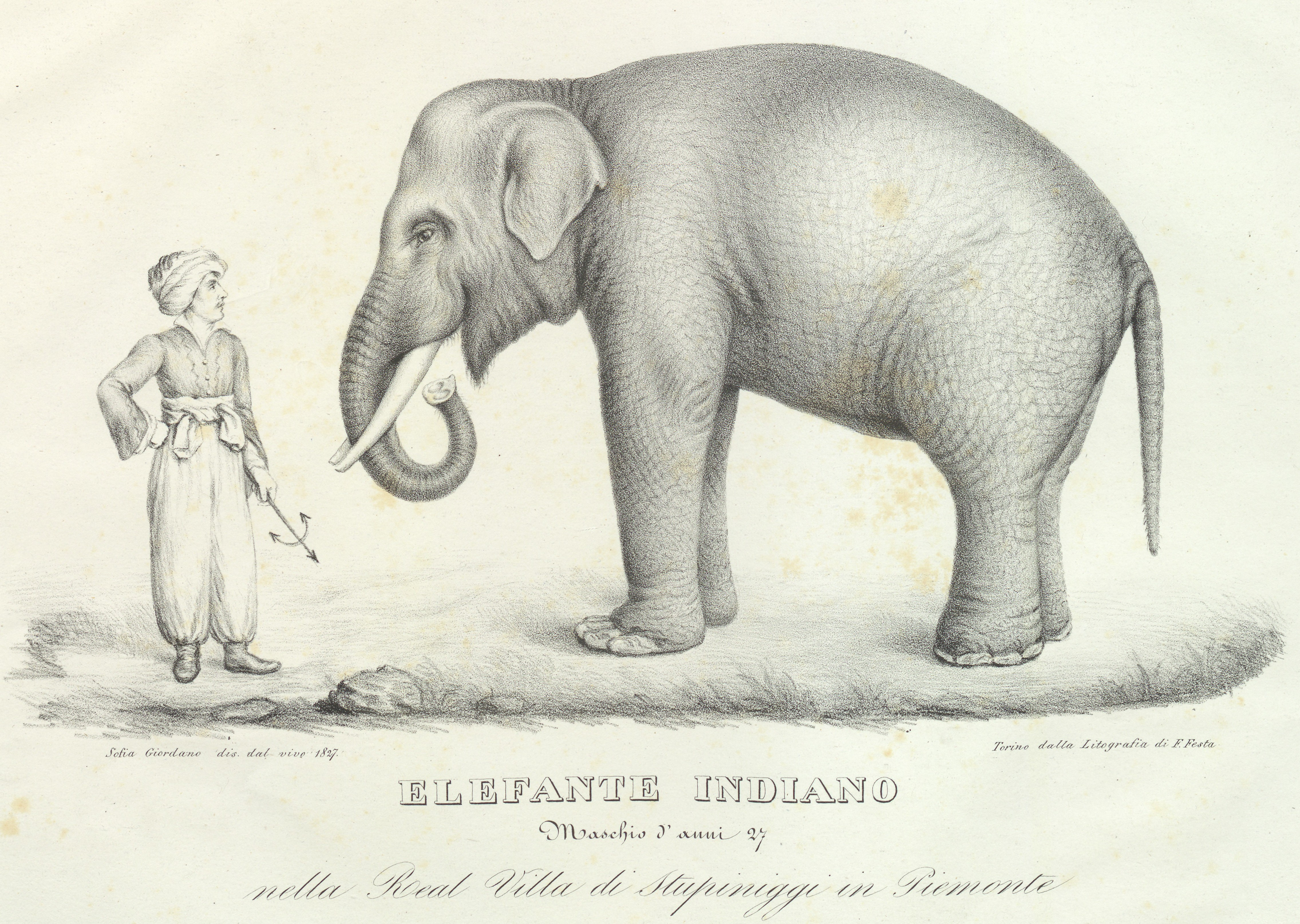
Fritz the Indian elephant (donated to Charles Felix) in the Royal Villa of Stupinigi, 1827.

The hunting park that belonged to a branch of the House of Savoy was given to Emmanuel Philibert, Duke of Savoy in 1563, when he moved the capital of the Duchy of Savoy from Chambéry to Turin. The garden of the hunting lodge and the surrounding hunting estate are clearly distinguished in Stupinigi: the complex, in fact, is part of a large geometric garden, characterized by a continuous succession of flowerbeds, parterres and avenues. This park, bordered by a wall and intersected by long avenues, was designed by the French gardener Michael Benard in 1740. The hunting park, or estate, was instead constituted by the vast area of almost 1,700 hectares that extended outside the fenced park and which had been expropriated by Emmanuel Philibert in 1563 from the Pallavicini family. This area included land and woods included today in the municipalities of Nichelino, Orbassano and Candiolo.

Since 1992, woods and agricultural land surrounding Stupinigi have been preserved as the Parco naturale di Stupinigi. Included in the communal territories of Nichelino, Candiolo and Orbassano, it has an area of 17.32 km^{2} (6.7 sq mi) that includes a part of the region's original lowland forest, where visitors can admire some rare plant species no longer widely found elsewhere. Wildlife includes beech martens, weasels, foxes, hazel dormice, European hares, white storks, tree squirrels and others.

== See also ==
- List of Baroque residences

== Sources ==
- Roberto, Baffert; Francesco Fenoglio (1998). Castelvecchio di Stupinigi: storia e trasformazioni. Cavallermaggiore: Centro Stampa. ISBN 88-86637-10-1.
- Carlo, Balma Mion (2007). Lodovico Bò (1721-1800). Misuratore, soprastante, architetto. Trento: UNI Service. ISBN 978-88-6178-060-6.
