= Antonio Bettini =

Italian bishop (1396–1487)

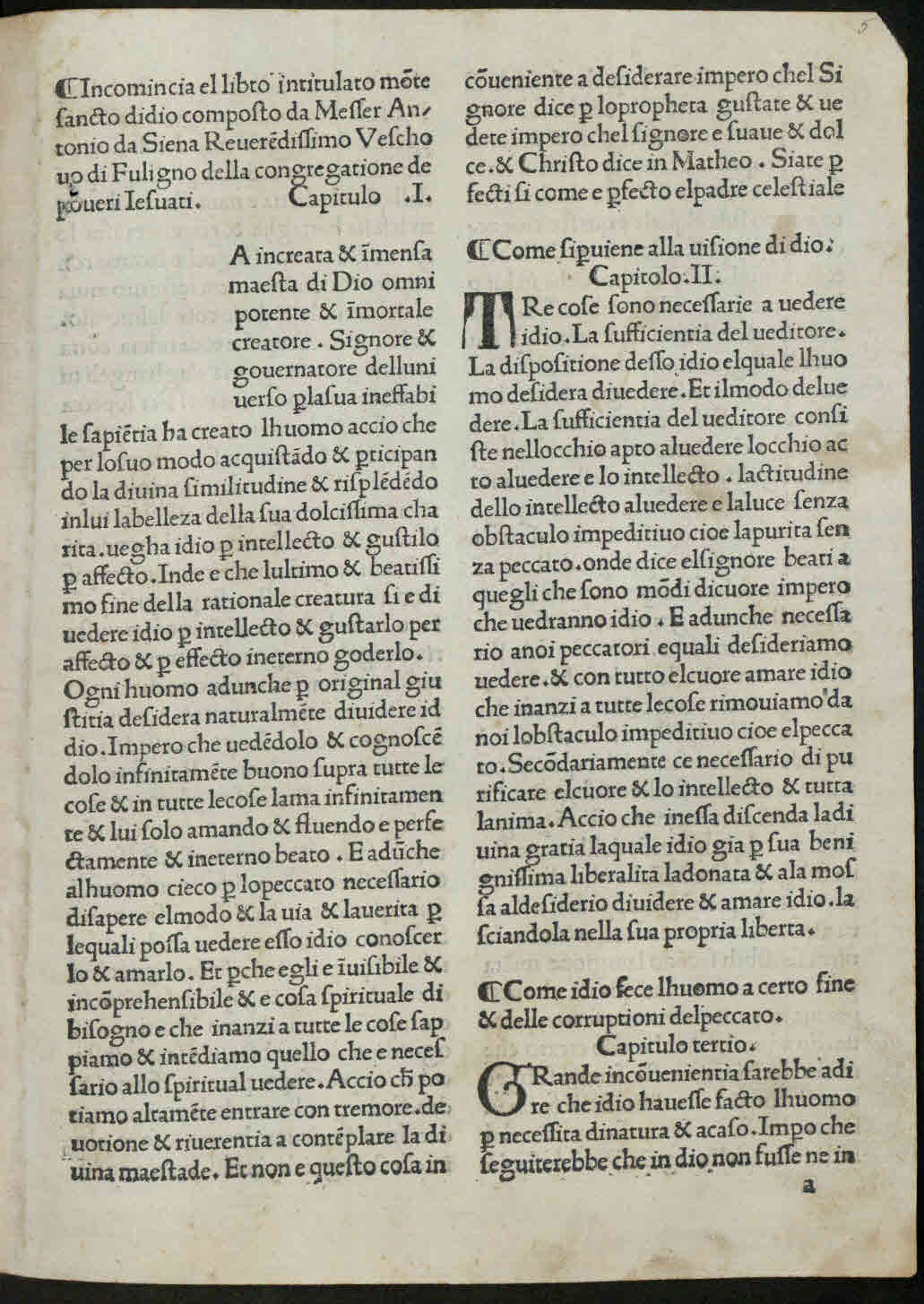
Monte santo di Dio, 1491

Antonio Bettini (13 June 1396 – 22 October 1487) was an Italian clergyman, diplomat and writer.

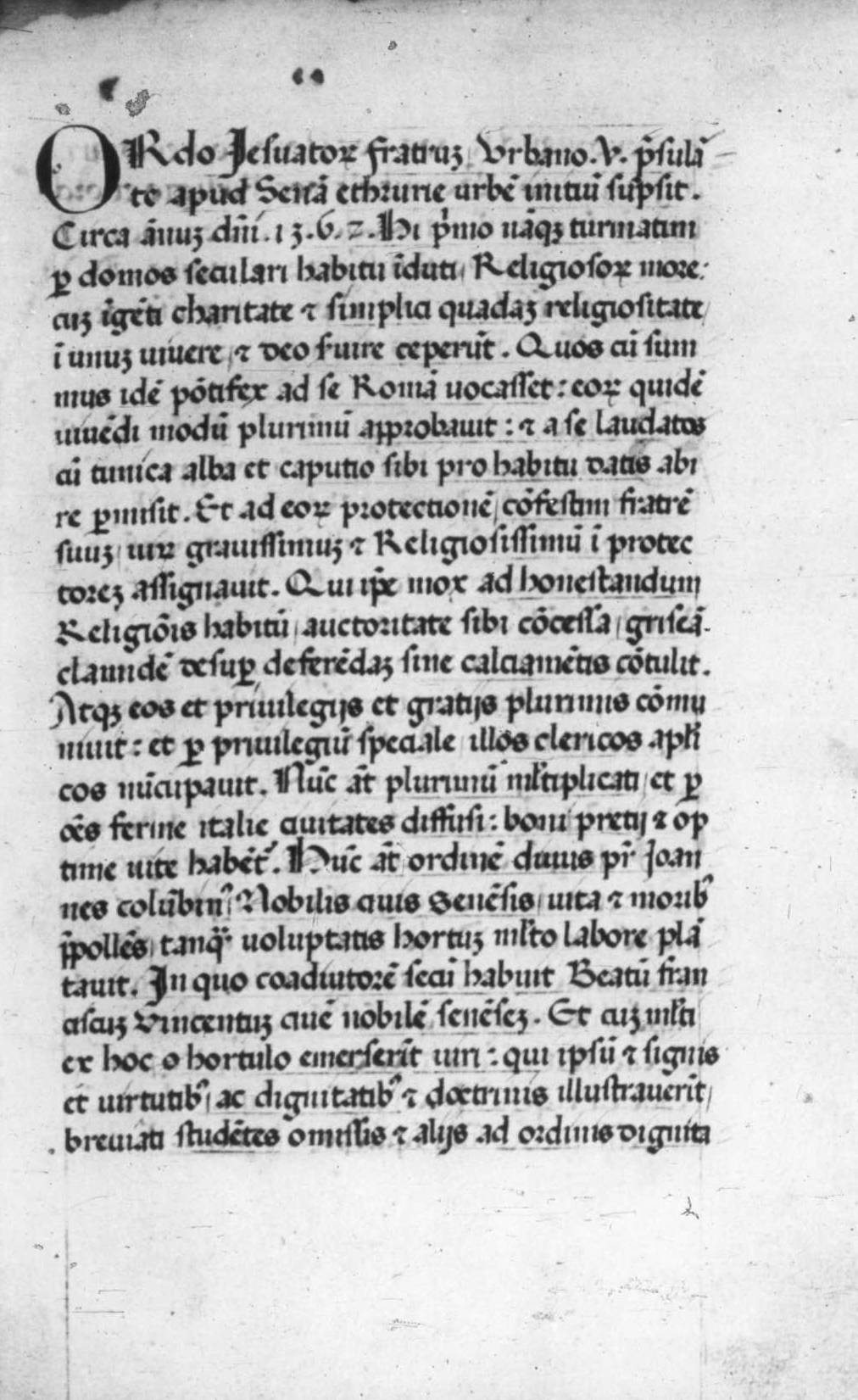
Tractatus sive allegationes, Roma 1492, 15th-century manuscript. Parma, Biblioteca Palatina, Fondo Parmense.

Bettini was born in Siena in 1396. He joined the convent of San Girolamo in Siena in 1439 and worked closely with Pope Pius II. Pius made Bettini bishop of Foligno in 1461. For Pope Sixtus IV, Bettini may have travelled to France (1474) and Germany (1481). He retired to his original convent in Siena in 1486 and died a year later. Bettini was revered by later biographers and sometimes referred to as "Beato" (Blessed) (a step toward canonization), but this designation was never church-sanctioned.

Bettini was known as a prolific writer. His Monte Santo di Dio (1477) described how one could use science and virtue to reach closer to God. This work, printed in Florence by Nicolaus Laurentii is especially notable in that it is possibly the first printed work to contain copper plate engravings. These were executed by Baccio Baldini, based on designs by Botticelli.
