= Costantino Sereno =

Italian painter (1829–1893)

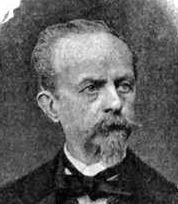
Costantino Sereno

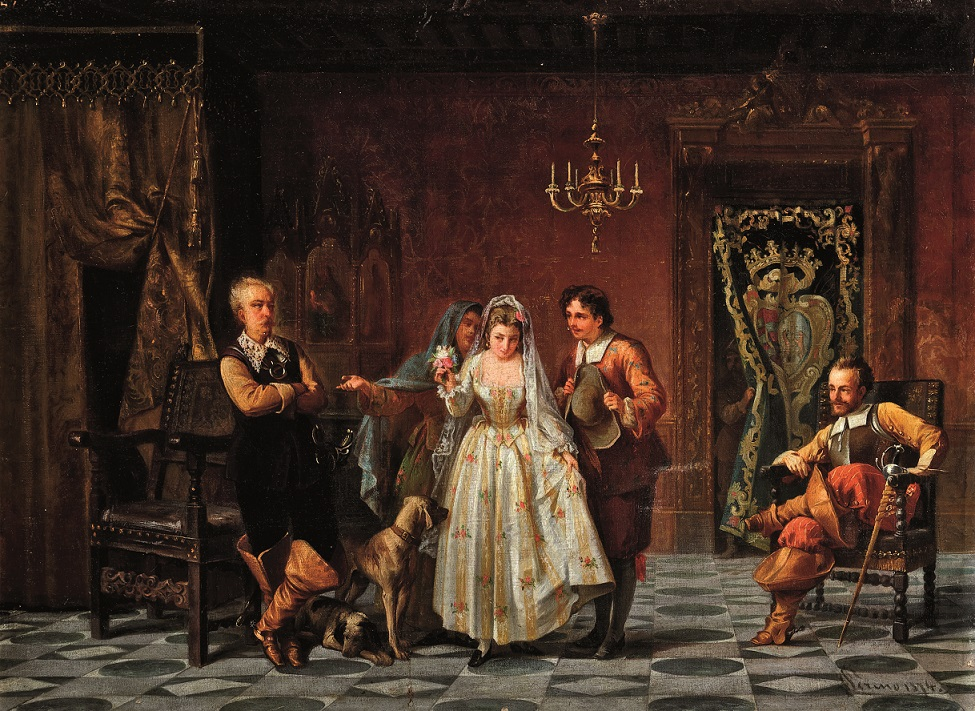
Historical Scene (1874)

Costantino Sereno (1829, Casale Monferrato, Province of Alessandria - 1893, Turin) was an Italian painter.

== Life and work ==
He was born in Casale Monferrato in Piedmont and studied at the Albertina Academy until the early 1840s. At first, His work consisted mostly of historical paintings. He exhibited in 1881 at Milan with a genre painting called The Kilo. In 1884, he had exhibits in Rome and Turin with a set of paintings depicting a "Monacanda" (a candidate for a monastic order): Monacanda Before Pronouncing the Vows and Monacanda, an Hour Before Taking the Monastic Clothes. He also exhibited Discovery of a Bersagliere and A Kiss of Furtive Origin.

Later, he presented decorative projects for the municipal theatre in Casale Monferrato, as well as the ceiling of the Teatro Scribe and the curtain of the Teatro Alfieri, both in Turin.

Among his frescoes are those for the Duomo in Casale Monferrato (1860-1861), the Palazzo Carignano, the Sanctuary della Consolata, the Church of San Secondo, and the church of Santa Maria Ausiliatrice; the last four all in Turin. He also created Angels and the Assumption of the Virgin (1865) for the parish church of Fubine, near Alessandria. In addition to frescoes, he also designed mosaics and stained glass windows. He exhibited at the Turin Promotrice (Society for Promotion of the Arts) from 1844 to 1888, to tepid public reception, but abundant royal patronage.
