= Gaetano Perego =

Italian painter

Gaetano Perego (died 1783) was an Italian painter active in Northern Italy.

Few biographical details are known about this painter. He worked in the Sanctuary of Vicoforte in preparation for the wedding of Victor Amadeus III of Savoy and Maria Antonietta of Bourbon in 1750. In 1753–1780, he helped decorate the Carignano theatre in Turin, and the Hunting Lodge of Stupinigi. He married the daughter of the painter Vittorio Amedeo Cignaroli. Perego died in Turin.

== Bibliography ==
- Luigi Mallè. Stupinigi. Tipografia torinese editrice, 1968.
