= Francesco Berlinghieri =

Italian humanist and geographer (1440–1501)

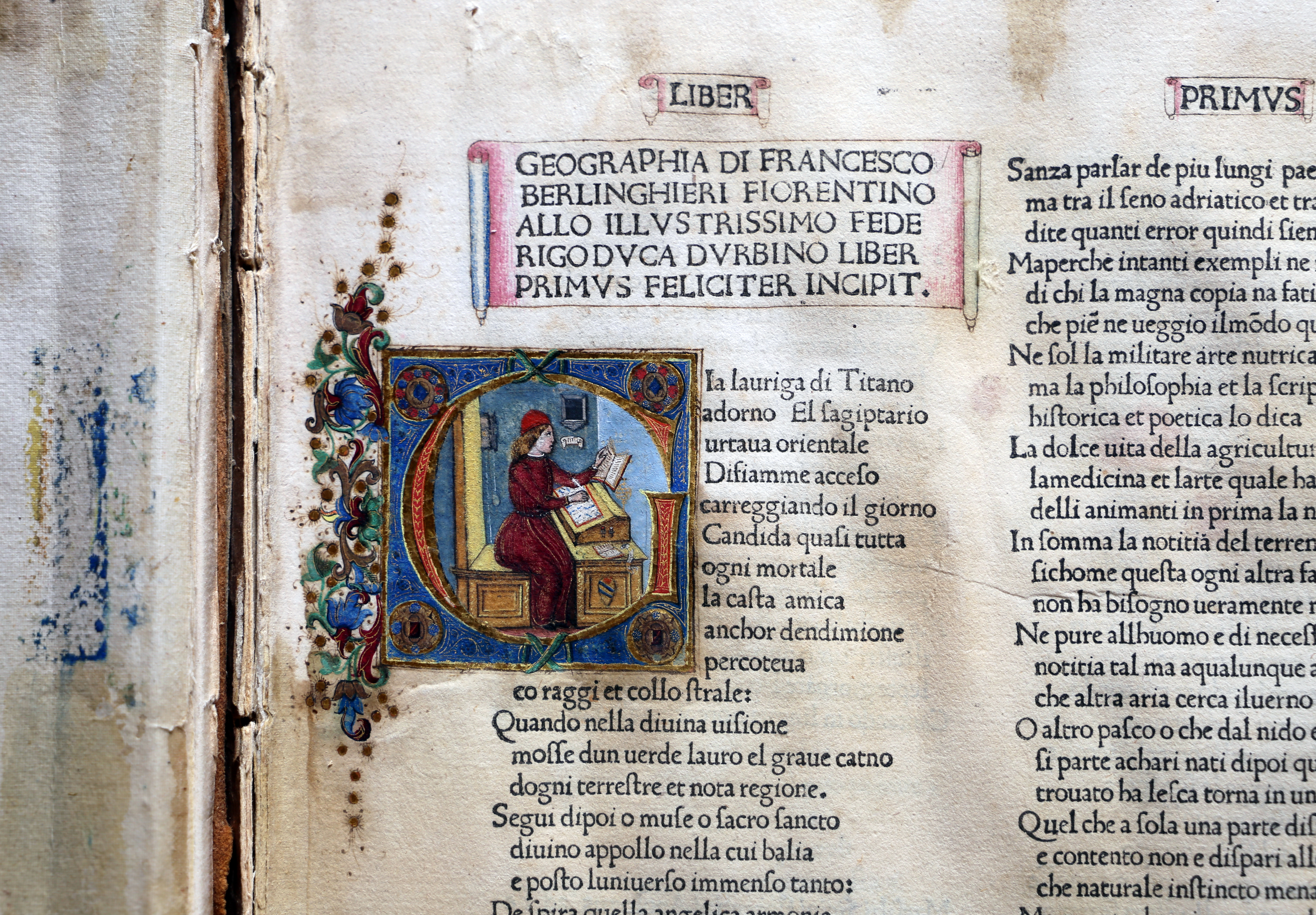
Illuminated letter in an edition of his Geographia (Accademia della Crusca library)

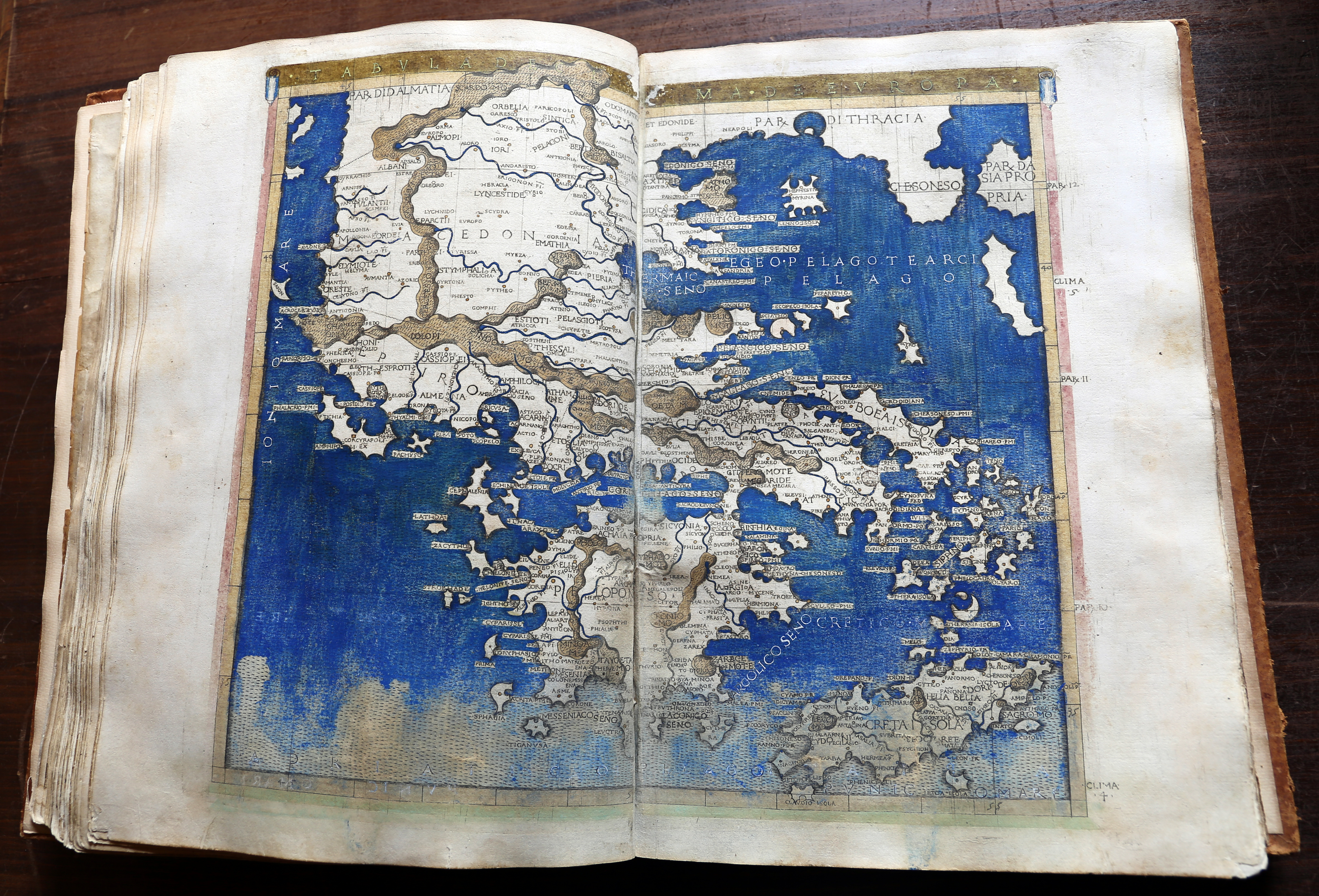
A map of Greece in Geographia

Francesco Berlinghieri (1440–1501) was a Florentine scholar and humanist who lived during the fifteenth century. He promoted the value of classical Greek learning and was one of the first to print a text based on Ptolemy's Geography. Berlinghieri studied poetry under the tutelage of Cristoforo Landino.

== Career ==
Berlinghieri was born in Florence into a family with over 200 years of involvement in Florentine politics. He served in a variety of governmental offices including as Prior of the Signoria and Conservator of Laws. In 1479 he was appointed Florentine ambassador at the Gonzaga court in Mantua¹. He later found employment in Florence in the court of Lorenzo de' Medici and took part in the Platonic Academy, founded by Marsilio Ficino. Berlinghieri provided financial support to Ficino during the latter's translation of Plato's works into Latin.

In 1464 Berlinghieri started to work on a treatise based upon Ptolemy's Geography. He updated its maps and included a commentary in verse form. It was printed in 1482 with copper engraved maps by the German printer Nicolaus Laurentii, also known as Niccolò Tedesco, under the title Septe Giornate della Geographia di Francesco Berlinghieri meaning "The Seven Days of Geography". It was one of the first printed works based on Ptolemy and also the first to be printed in vernacular Italian. Berlinghieri was also among the first to supplement the traditional maps contained in the Geographia with updated maps of France, Italy, Spain, British Isles and the Holy Land, based on the work of Nicolaus Germanus.² He painstakingly identified Ptolemy's place names with contemporary toponyms and, aside from Ptolemy, also sourced information from classical geographers Strabo and Diodorus of Sicily.

Berlinghieri's work was originally to be dedicated to the Ottoman Sultan Mehmed II. When the sultan died in 1481, Berlinghieri dedicated it to Federico da Montefeltro, the Duke of Urbino. Unfortunately, the duke died before the final edition was printed. Additionally, manuscript copies of the book were dedicated to Lorenzo de' Medici and Federigo da Montefeltro and individual copies of the printed edition were dedicated to the Ottoman Sultan, at that time Bayezid II and his half-brother Cem Sultan.³
