= Giordano Orsini (died 1438) =

Roman Catholic Cardinal

Giordano Orsini (1360/70 — 29 May 1438) was an Italian cardinal who enjoyed an extensive career in the early fifteenth century. He was a member of the powerful Roman family of the Orsini.

== Biography ==
Orsini was Archbishop of Naples from 1400 until 1405, when he was made a Cardinal by Innocent VII. In 1408, he abandoned the "Roman Obedience" and attended the Council of Pisa. He was subsequently administrator of the see of Pécs 1409–10, and legate of Antipope John XXIII in Spain, Picenum and Bologna. Promoted to the suburbicarian see of Albano in 1412, he had a considerable role in the Council of Constance, where he presided over the fifth session. He was the papal legate appointed to establish peace between England and France in 1418. He became part of the Grand penitentiary in 1419. In 1420, he was named Abbot Commendatory of the Imperial Abbey of Farfa. He was a legate of Pope Martin V in Bohemia, Hungary and Germany in prosecution of the Hussites in 1426.

He became Dean of the Sacred College of Cardinals in 1428, and he presided over the 1431 Papal conclave. Orsini opted for the suburbicarian see of Sabina on 14 March 1431. As the legate of Pope Eugenius IV to open the Council of Basle, he defended the rights of the Pope against the claims of conciliarist movement. He was Archpriest of the patriarchal Vatican Basilica from 1434 until his death. He is buried in a tomb in St. Peter's Basilica in Rome.

== Patron of the arts ==
Orsini's status put him in a position to be a major patron of the arts, and during the pontificate of Martin V (1417–31), the Cardinal of Santa Sabina, as he was called, became the center of an early circle of humanist culture that included Leonardo Bruni, Poggio Bracciolini, Leonardo Dati and Lorenzo Valla, who recalled how the scholars would gather, dressed in antique robes, to discuss topics of human conduct in Classical and Christian terms. Orsini assembled a library with 244 manuscripts, which passed at his death intact to the Vatican Library. His seat was the fortress-palazzo crowning "Monte Giordano", a small rise south-east of the Ponte Sant'Angelo, which had been built in the twelfth century by the Roncioni, and had been converted and extended into a palatial complex by the Orsini.

Around 1430, Orsini built in the palazzo a sala teatri for his humanistic gatherings; it was the first permanent indoor theatre built in the Renaissance. Its walls were painted with an audience of illustrious personages of history, painted full-length in a cavalcade, row upon row, three hundred figures by the time the frescoes were completed, winding their way down the walls. Such a grand scheme was beyond the powers of Roman painters, whose skills and workshops had diminished during the Avignon Papacy, when the sources of patronage were removed from Rome. The Cardinal turned to the Florentine Masolino da Panicale, currently at work in Rome. The young Paolo Uccello also played a part in the enterprise.

Among Orsini's friends was the Danish cartographer Claudius Clavus, who lived in Rome.

The humanist circle disbanded when Giordano Orsini followed Pope Eugenius IV into voluntary exile from Rome in 1434. He spent the remainder of his life in Florence and northern Italy and never returned.
