= San Girolamo in Campansi =

Church and convent in Siena, Italy

Coordinates: 43°19′30.6″N 11°19′41.3″E

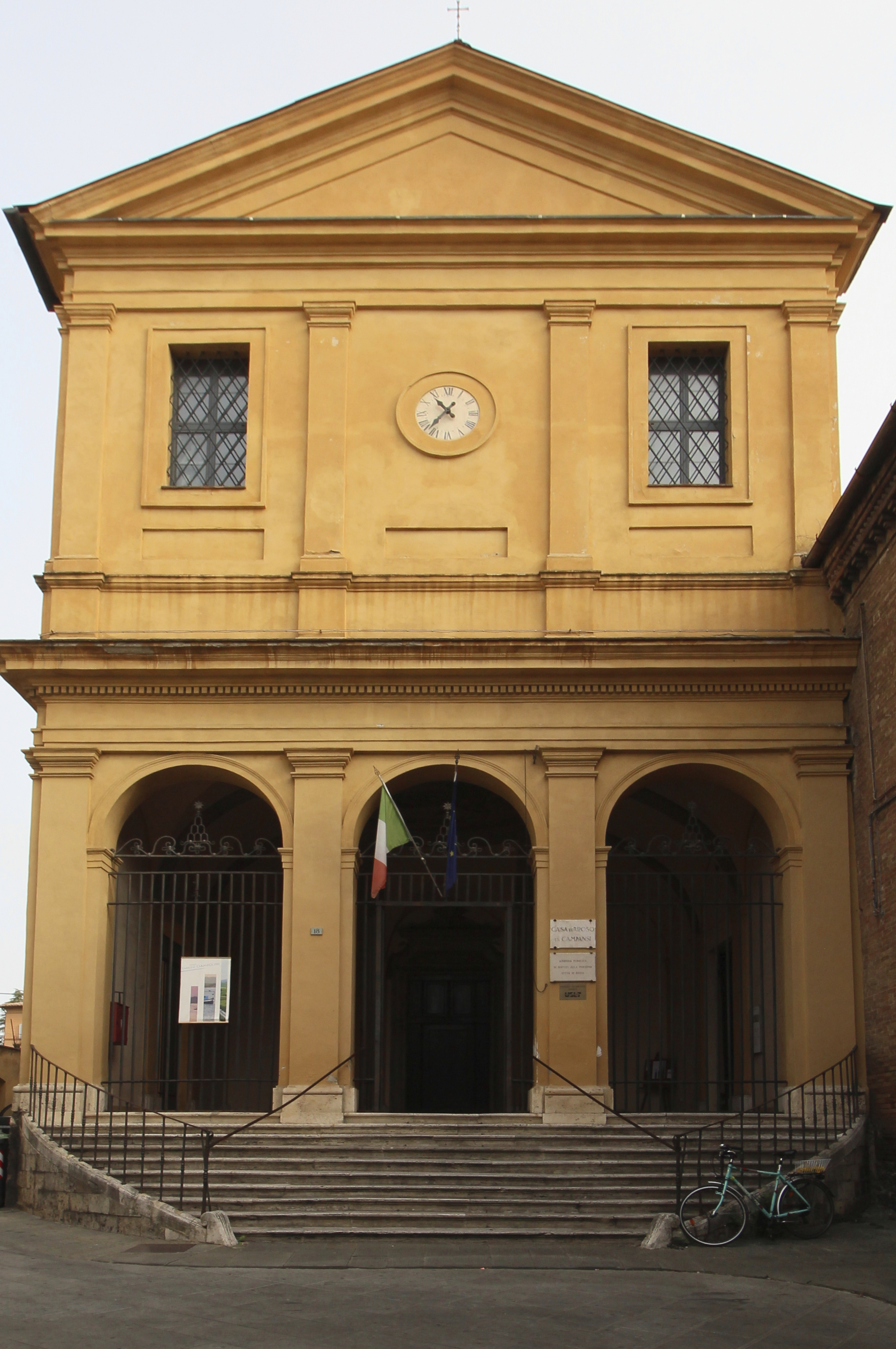
Church San Girolamo in Campansi, Via Campansi, Terzo di Camollia, City Center of Siena, Province of Siena, Italy.

The Monastery of San Girolamo in Campansi is a former convent located on Via Campansi #18 in the city of Siena, region of Tuscany, Italy. The Baroque-style church still stands as an independent chapel; while the monastery has been converted to a nursing home (Casa di Riposo) for the elderly. There is a separate Monastery of San Girolamo on via San Girolamo, located in a different contrada of Siena.

== History ==
Located in the northern peninsula of medieval Siena, the monastery was located adjacent to what would be called the Porta di Campansi. The monastery originated from a few woman aligned with the Franciscan order in the late 13th to early 14th century. They obtained from the republic the donation of houses in this district, known for its abundance of prostitutes. However, only in 1420-1430 was a monastery building erected, and in 1473 the nuns obtained permission from Pope Sixtus IV to erect an oratory at the site. In 1575, the convent housed some 77 women seeking vocation. Only in 1613 did the monastery receive official recognition by Cardinal Metello Bichi. It soon became popular among the aristocratic classes to accommodate their women to the cloistered life. For example, Berenice, daughter of Agostino Chigi, took on the vows of a Poor Clares in 1683. The great-grandsons of Pope Alexander VII endowed the decoration of the structures.

Construction of the church began in 1683; the facade consists of three ground floor arches. The church was built perpendicular to the former oratory.

The convent was suppressed in 1808 during the Napoleonic occupation, but re-opened in 1816, only to undergo a final suppression in 1874. The property was ceded to a charitable communal office of the Ricovero di Mendicita (Recovery from Poverty). In 1889, it became an asylum for abandoned elders. The convent underwent numerous modifications over the last two centuries.

== Artworks ==
The church contains a fresco attributed to the studio of Sano di Pietro (1460–70). The ceiling of the church has frescoes depicting the Glory of St Peter of Alcantara with the Virgin, St Francis, and Christ attributed to a Giulio Coralli and Niccolò Ricciolini. It is stated that some of the painting or designs were by Michelangelo and Girolamo di Benvenuto and Bartolomeo Neroni. It houses a painting of St Anne and the Madonna and Child with Saint Ursula and the Magdalen, attributed to Domenico Beccafumi.

A survey from the 1840s claim that the church contained paintings by a Pietro Locatelli, and the main altarpiece was a copy of Domenichino's Communion of St Jerome. Nearby on via del Pignattello are the remnant of the Monastery of the Convertite of Santa Maria della Grazie.
