= Giovanni Battista Bernero =

Italian sculptor

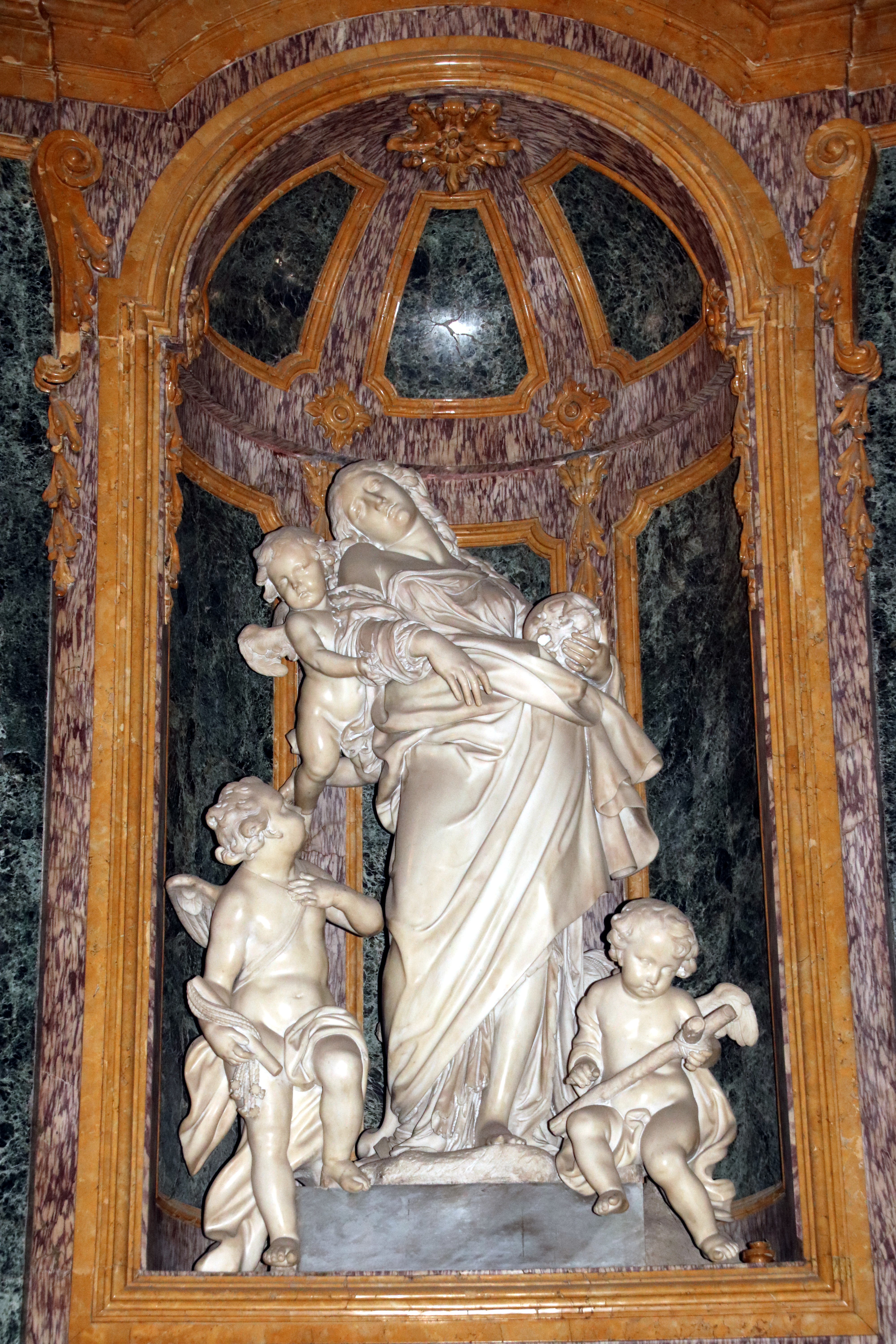
- Ecstasy of Mary Magdalen, Casale Monferrato Cathedral
- Born: 1736; Cavallerleone, Kingdom of Sardinia
- Died: 7 January 1796 (aged 59–60); Turin, Kingdom of Sardinia
- Known for: Sculpture
- Movement: Late-Baroque

Giovanni Battista Bernero (1736 – 7 January 1796) was an Italian late-Baroque sculptor who worked, mainly in Piedmont, in a formalized restrained style, intermediate between baroque and Neoclassicism. He is known for his sculptures of mythological figures associated with hunting for the royal hunting lodge at Stupinigi as well as a stucco relief for Carignano Cathedral, depicting St. Remigius and St. John the Baptist.

== Biography ==
=== Early life and education ===
He was born in Cavallerleone in Piedmont. A royal subsidy provided by Charles Emmanuel III of Savoy enabled him to apprentice with the royal academy of sculpture in Turin under Claudio Francesco Beaumont. In 1765 he traveled to Rome where he trained under the Piedmontese brothers Ignazio and Filippo Collino. In 1770, he completed a statue of the Ecstasy of Mary Magdalen for the Casale Monferrato Cathedral.

=== Career ===
In 1774 Victor Amadeus III made Bernero court sculptor. After a second stay in Rome in 1778, Bernero became professor at the Accademia Reale in Turin. Shortly thereafter (Bernero's chronology remains uncertain) he created an Assumption with Angels (1780; Turin, San Francesco d’Assisi), in the Baroque scenographic tradition that so appealed to him.

There is evidence that Bernero might have been moving away from the Baroque to a Neo-classical style in works after 1780, as in his History of Saint Evasio (Casale, Cathedral), but the obscure chronology of his later years makes it difficult to trace his stylistic changes with certainty. Bernero had two artist sons: Vittorio Amadeo Bernero was a sculptor and Luigi Bernero was a gifted portrait painter. Luigi learnt this skill perhaps from his father, who had demonstrated his own talent in this area in, for instance, the series of marble medallions containing likenesses of members of the royal house of Savoy (c. 1780; Royal Palace of Turin).

== Sources ==
- Bruce Boucher (1998). Italian Baroque Sculpture. World of Art. London: Thames & Hudson. pp. 212–13.
- Web Gallery of Art biography
