= House of Rohan =

Breton noble family

House of Rohan Maison de Rohan
- Parent house: Porhoët
- Origin: Duchy of Brittany
- Founded: 1116; 910 years ago
- Founder: Alan I, Viscount of Rohan
- Current head: Charles VI Raoul de Rohan, Duke of Montbazon
- Titles: See list
- Connected families: Rohan-Chabot
- Motto: A plus
- Estates: Rohan Castle; Palais Rohan, Strasbourg; Palais Rohan, Bordeaux; Josselin Castle; Château de Joyeuse Garde; Château de Blain; Saint-Étienne-du-Gué-de-l'Isle; Sychrov Castle; Hôtel de Soubise
- Cadet branches: Rohan-Guéméné; Rohan-Rochefort; Rohan-Soubise; Rohan-Gié; Rohan-Gué-de-l'Isle; Rohan-Polduc; Rohan-Montauban

The House of Rohan (Breton: Roc'han) is a Breton family of viscounts, later dukes and princes in the French nobility, coming from the locality of Rohan in Brittany. Their line descends from the viscounts of Porhoët and is said to trace back to the legendary Conan Meriadoc. Through the Porhoët family, the Rohans are related to the Dukes of Brittany, with whom the family intermingled again after its inception. During the Middle Ages, it was one of the most powerful families in the Duchy of Brittany. The Rohans developed ties with the French and English royal houses as well, and they played an important role in French and European history.

The only surviving line of the family is the branch of Rohan-Rochefort, Dukes of Montbazon, Dukes of Bouillon and Austrian Princes of Rohan, who migrated in the early 19th century to what is now Austria.

Following his marriage in 1645 with Marguerite de Rohan, only daughter of Henri II de Rohan, first Duke of Rohan (who died in 1638 with no male heir), Henri Chabot, a descendant of the eldest branch of the House of Chabot from Poitou, was made Duke of Rohan in 1648 and allowed to use the name of Rohan-Chabot instead of his own, thus giving rise to the House of Rohan-Chabot.

== Origins ==
The family of Rohan claimed descent from the first kings of Brittany, and even from the legendary ruler Conan Meriadoc.

The Rohans were descended from the Viscounts of Porhoët. According to J.-P. Soubigou, the first known viscount, Guethenoc (fl. 1028), was probably Viscount of Rennes as well and connected to the nobility of the Loire region, but he could have belonged to a Breton line holding estates around Josselin, where he built a castle.

Guethenoc's son Josselin I († 1074) took part in the Norman Conquest of England. He was granted lands in Bedfordshire, Buckinghamshire and Gloucestershire, as well as the town of Caerwent. He was the father of Mainguy, Bishop of Vannes, and Odo I, Viscount of Porhoët, Rohan and Guéméné († after 1092), who married Anne of Léon and had several sons – Geoffrey, who inherited the viscounty of Porhoët, and Alain I the Black (1084–1147), Viscount of Rohan and Castelnoec (fl. 1127), who built the castle of Rohan and was the first member of the House of Rohan.

== History ==
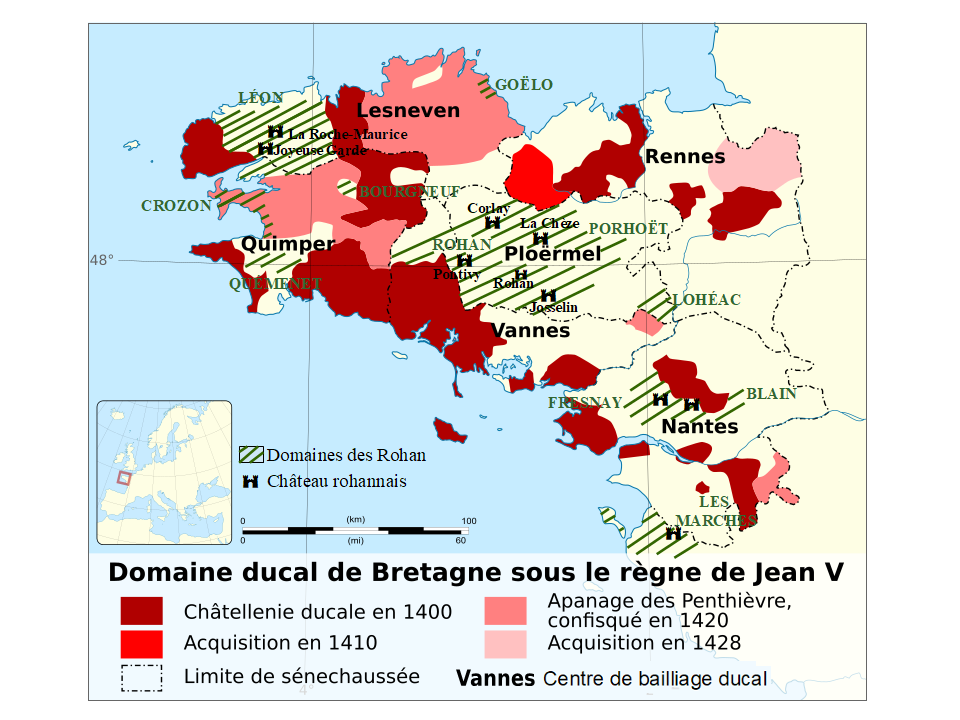
Rohan estates in the 15th century (black hatching)

From the 12th century to the 15th century, the Rohans kept securing and increasing their estates through marriages, acquisitions, inheritances, bequests and exchanges. Thus they became rivals of the Dukes of Brittany all through the Middle Ages, according to their interest, sometimes carrying out the most important charges of the Duchy faithfully, sometimes rebelling, as John II of Rohan did in the last years of Breton independence. The "great viscount", then more powerful than ever, controlled nearly 200,000 Bretons on about a fifth of the Breton territory. The heart of the viscounty of Rohan is made of the rohannais triangle (the three large fortresses of La Chèze, Josselin and Pontivy) whose center is the village of Rohan, the family's nominal fief whose castle is abandoned in favor of the other three.

To counter the power of the immense fiefs of the Rohan and Rieux families, which divided the Armorican peninsula into two equal parts, the Breton dukes denied them access to the coasts and blocked them in the eastern part of the duchy through the fortresses of the Breton March, whose main strongholds were Rennes and Nantes. The Rohans, then unpopular in a very Breton-tradition environment, were neutralized for the time being, and struck back only with the French army's direct support during the campaign of 1487 in the French–Breton War, which was marked by internal divisions among the barons of Brittany (Rohan, Rieux, Laval...) who constantly changed sides. In winter 1487–1488, John II was encircled by the ducal troops: his strongholds of La Chèze, Josselin, Rohan and Pontivy fell one after another in March 1488. The viscount was still coveting the ducal crown for his son but failed. In 1491, the marriage between Anne of Brittany and Charles VIII initiated the annexation of the duchy to the French crown, a union that was permanently ratified in 1532.

The Rohan family married several times into the Breton ducal family, the last time in 1407.

Henry II of Rohan chose Pontivy as the capital city of his fief. The chief of the Protestant party during Marie de' Medici's regency Louis XIII's reign, he was one of the greatest captains of his time.

In the 17th century, members of the Rohan family began to use their genealogy and their power at the French Court to obtain the rank of prince étranger, thus coming second after the princes du sang before all dukes and peers. Their aim was to prove that the former Kings of Brittany effectively ruled and that the Rohans are directly descended from them.

These two assertions were difficult to establish at the time and are not used in the 21st-century historiography. The Rohans then applied themselves to giving credence to this version through historians such as Dom Morice, but also through favour, forcing and violating history if needed. The Rohans had to force their claims through thanks to forged evidence (a common practice in these aristocratic families in the ancien régime).

This operation remained uncertain, the Dukes and peers of France being watchful, and the Rohans secured their position through other means: alliances with other families of princes étrangers exclusively (Lorraine, La Tour d'Auvergne and Condé), elevation of their estates into principalities, legally or not (Guéméné, Soubise, Lordship of Léon), accession to the Bishopric of Strasbourg, giving them the rank of Prince of the Empire, and the use of royal favor and their closeness to the kings (Louis XIV and Madame de Soubise, Louis XV and the Marshal of Soubise, Louis XVI and Madame de Marsan, governess of the Children of France).

In spite of attacks from rival families, the Rohans managed to base their power and impose their historical and genealogical views, which provided them with positions allowing them to secure their power and credit at Court. The greatest closeness to the King was then acquired and could not be questioned any more.

== Descent tree ==
The family of Rohan has a long documented history, with close ties to the Dukes of Brittany.

Descent tree of the main branches
- House of Rohan
    - Barons Zouche branch
      - Rohan eldest branch (†)
        - Rohan-Guéméné branch (†)
              - Rohan-Rochefort branch
            - Rohan-Soubise branch (†)
          - Rohan-Gié branch (†)
            - House of Rohan-Chabot (descended from Rohan in female line)
        - Rohan-Gué-de-l'Isle branch (†)
          - Rohan-Polduc (†)
  - Rohan-Montauban branch (†)

Main family tree of the House of Rohan
- Guethenoc († after 1021), probably Viscount of Rennes; parentage unknown; m. Alarun of Cornouaille
  - Joscelin I (c. 1032–1074), Viscount of Porhoët; m. ?
    - Odo I († after 1092), Viscount of Porhoët; m. Emma of Léon († 1092)
      - Alan of Porhoët, a.k.a. Alan I of Rohan the Black (1084–1147), Viscount of Rohan and Castelnoec; m. (1128) Villana de Castille (c. 1085–?)
        - Alan II († 1170), Viscount of Rohan and Castelnoec, Lord of Guéméné and Guingamp; m. ?
          - Alan III (1135–1195), Viscount of Rohan; m. (after 1164) Constance of Penthièvre (c. 1140 – c. 1184), Lady of Corlay and Mur-de-Bretagne
            - Alan IV of Rohan, a.k.a. Alan IV the Younger (1166–1205), Viscount of Rohan, Lord of Guéméné, crusader; m. Mabilla of Fougères (? – before 1198)
              - Geoffrey I of Rohan (1190–1221), Viscount of Rohan; m. Margaret of Thouars; m. (after 04/05/1220) Gervasia of Vitré, a.k.a. Gervaise de Dinan (c. 1185 – c. 1238), Lady of Southern-Dinan and Léhon, Lady of Bécherel
              - Conan of Rohan (1190–1221)
              - Oliver I of Rohan (after 1191 – 1228), Viscount of Rohan
              - Alan V of Rohan (before 1205–1242), Viscount of Rohan; m. Eleanor of Porhoët (c. 1200–?), Lady of Lannouée
                - Alan VI of Rohan (1232–1304), Viscount of Rohan; m. Isabeau of Avaugour (?–1266); m. (1266) Thomasse of La Roche-Bernard (c. 1245 – after 1304)
                  - Oliver II of Rohan (1271–1326), Viscount of Rohan; m. (1307) Alix of Rochefort (c. 1285–?)
                    - Alan VII of Rohan (c. 1308–1352), Viscount of Rohan; m. (1322) Joan of Rostrenen (c. 1300–1372), Lady of Guéméné-Guégant
                      - John I of Rohan (1324–1396), Viscount of Rohan, Lord of Guéméné; m. (1349) Joan of Léon (?–1372), Lady of Léon
                        - Alan VIII of Rohan (1396–1429), Viscount of Rohan and Porhoët, Lord of Blain, Noyon-sur-Andelle, Pont-Saint-Pierre and Radepont; m. (1407) Beatrice of Clisson (?–1448), Viscountess of Porhoët, Lady of Blain, Baroness of Pontchâteau
                          - Alan IX of Rohan a.k.a. Alan IX the Builder (c. 1382–20/03/1462 in La Chèze), Viscount of Rohan and Porhoët, Lord of Léon Baron of Pontchâteau, Lord of Blain, Noyon-sur-Andelle, Pont-Saint-Pierre, Radepont and La Garnache; m. (26/06/1407 in Nantes) Margaret of Montfort a.k.a. Margaret of Brittany (1392–13/04/1428 in Blain), Lady of Guillac
                            - Alan of Rohan (1408–1449 in Fougères), Viscount of Porhoët; m. (1443) Yolande of Montfort-Laval (01/10/1421 in Nantes – 1487)
                            - Margaret of Rohan (–1496 in Cognac); m. (31/08/1449) John of Valois-Orléans a.k.a. John II of Valois-Angoulême (1399–1467), Count of Angoulême and Périgord, Duke of Milan; m. Giles of Montmorency-Laval a.k.a. Giles II of Laval-Loué (? – December 1559), Viscount of Brosse, Lord of Loué, Benais, Montsabert, Marcillé, Le Parvis, Bressuire, Maillé, La Rochecorborn, La Haye, and La Motte-Sainte-Heraye
                            - Joanna of Rohan (1415 – after 1459); m. (11/02/1442) Francis I, Lord of Rieux (11/08/1418–20/11/1458), Lord of Rieux and Rochefort, Baron of Malestroit, Count of Harcourt, Lord of Assérac, Viscount of Donges, Councillor and Chamberlain of Francis I of Brittany, Knight of the Order of the Ermine, Chamberlain of the Dauphin Louis
                            - Catherine of Rohan (c. 1425 – after 1471); m. (22/04/1429) James of Dinan (?–30/04/1444), Knight banneret, Lord of Beaumanoir, Montafilant, and Le Bodister, Captain of Josselin, Governor of Sablé, Grand Butler of France; m. (20/09/1447) Jean I of Albret (1430–03/01/1468), Viscount of Tartas
                            - Beatrice of Rohan (?–1418); m. (16/11/1450) Mary of Lorraine-Vaudémont (?–23/04/1455)
                            - John II of Rohan (16/11/1452–01/04/1516 in Blain), Viscount of Rohan and Léon, Count of Porhoët, Lord of Blain, La Garnache and Beauvoir-sur-Mer, Councillor and Chamberlain of King Charles VIII, chief-lieutenant of Brittany; m. (1462) Marie of Montfort a.k.a. Marie of Brittany (1446–1511)
                              - Francis of Rohan (1469–1488 in Saint-Aubin-du-Cormier)
                              - John of Rohan (1476–1505)
                              - James of Rohan (1478 – 23/10/1527 in Corlay), Viscount of Rohan and Léon, Count of Porhoët; m. Françoise of Daillon du Lude; m. Françoise of Rohan-Guéméné (see lower)
                              - George of Rohan (1479–1502)
                              - Claude of Rohan (1480–08/07/1540), Bishop of Quimper and Cornouaille
                              - Anne of Rohan (1485–05/04/1529 in Blain), Viscountess of Rohan; m. (25/09/1515) Peter II of Rohan-Gié (?–1525), Lord of Blain, Frontenay, La Marche and Gié, Viscount of Carentan (see lower)
                              - Marie of Rohan (?–1542); m. (1511) Louis IV of Rohan-Guéméné (?–1527), Lord of Guéméné (see lower)
                            - Catherine of Rohan; m. René of Keradreux

m. (1456) Petronnilla of Maillé, Dowager Baroness of Pontchâteau

                            - Peter of Rohan a.k.a. Peter of Quintin (1456–24/06/1491), Baron of Pontchâteau, Lord of La Garnache, Baron of Quintin jure uxoris; m. (20/11/1484) Joan du Perrier (?–1504), Baroness of Quintin and Blossac, Lady of La Roche d'Iré
                              - Christopher of Rohan (? – before 1491)

m. Joan of Daillon
m. Isabella of La Chapelle (?–1519), Lady of La Chapelle and Molac

                            - Louis of Rohan
                            - Francis of Rohan
                            - Antoine of Rohan
                            - Madeleine of Rohan, nun in Fontevrault
                            - Anne of Rohan, nun in Fontevrault
                            - Isabella of Rohan
                        - Joan of Rohan, Lady of Noyon-sur-Andelle; m. (05/04/1374) Robert of Valois a.k.a. Robert d'Alençon (1344–1377), Count of Perche; m. Peter II of Amboise (c. 1357–1426), Viscount of Thouars
                        - Margaret of Rohan; m. John Botterel-Quintin
                        - Edward of Rohan (? – c. 1445), vicomte de Léon; m. (1406) Margaret of Châteaubriant (?–27/04/1414), Lady of Portric and La Marousière
                          - Joan of Rohan; m. William of Saint-Gilles
                          - Louise of Rohan, Lady of Léon; m. Patry III of Châteaugiron (?–27/04/1427 in Pontorson), Lord of Châteaugiron and Derval, Grand Chamberlain of Brittany; m. John of Rostrenen, Lord of Coetdor and La Chesnaye
                        - Guy of Rohan; m. (1373) Joan of Évreux a.k.a. Joan of Navarre (1339–1409)
                        - Charles of Rohan a.k.a. Charles I of Rohan-Guéméné (1375–1438), Lord of Guéméné; m. (1405) Catherine du Guesclin (?–1461)
                          - Louis I de Rohan-Guéméné (?–15/12/1457 in Saint-Quentin-les-Anges), Lord of Guéméné; m. (07/11/1443) Marie of Montauban (?–1497)
                            - Louis II of Rohan-Guéméné the Great (c. 1444–25/05/1508), Lord of Guéméné, Baron of Lanvaux, Lord of La Roche-Moysan, Mortiercrolles, Condé-sur-Noireau, Tracy and Vassy; m. (12/06/1463) Louise of Rieux (01/03/1446 in Ancenis – ?)
                              - John of Rohan-Guéméné (c. 1475–1524), Lord of Landal, Governor of Touraine; m. Guyonne of Lorgeril (?–1502), Lady of Lorgeril
                                - Catherine of Rohan-Guéméné (?–1556), Lady of La Ribaudière; m. Tanneguy of Kermaven; m. Gilbert of Limoges
                                - Margaret of Rohan-Guéméné (?–1550), Lady of Tressant and La Tourniolle; m. Louis of Malestroit, Lord of Pontcallec
                                - Helena of Rohan-Guéméné (?–1541), Lady of Landal and Lorgeril; m. Francis of Maure (1497–1556), Count of Maure

m. Isabella of La Chapelle (?–1519), Lady of La Chapelle and Molac

                              - Margaret of Rohan-Guéméné (c. 1479–?); m. (1490) Francis of Maillé (c. 1465 – May 1501), Viscount of Tours, Baron of Maillé
                              - Louis III of Rohan-Guéméné (?–1498), Lord of Guéméné; m. (1482) Renée de Fou
                                - Louis IV of Rohan-Guéméné (?–1527), Lord of Guéméné; m. (1511) Marie of Rohan (?–1542) (see above)
                                  - Louis V of Rohan-Guéméné (1513–1557), Lord of Guéméné; m. (1529) Margaret of Montfort-Laval (1523–?), Lady of Perrier
                                    - Louis VI de Rohan-Guéméné (03/04/1540–04/06/1611), Prince of Guéméné, Count of Montbazon; m. (22/07/1561) Eleanor of Rohan-Gié (1539–1583), Countess of Rochefort (see lower)
                                      - Renée of Rohan-Guéméné (1558–?); m. (1578) John of Coëtquen (?–1602), Count of Combourg
                                      - Lucrecia of Rohan-Guéméné (1560–?); m. (1574) James of Tournemine (?–1584 in Rennes), Marquis of Coetmeur, Lord of Landinière and Carmelin
                                      - Isabella of Rohan-Guéméné (1561–?); m. (1593) Nicolas of Pellevé, Count of Flers
                                      - Peter of Rohan-Guéméné (1567–1622), Prince of Guéméné, Duke of Montbazon, Baron of Mortiercrolles, Lord of Sainte-Maure; m. Madeleine of Rieux
                                        - Anne de Rohan-Guéméné (20/04/1606 in Saint-Quentin-les-Anges – 13/03/1685 in Rochefort-en-Yvelines), Princess of Guéméné; m. (02/021619) Louis VIII de Rohan-Guéméné (05/08/1598–28/02/1667 in Coupvray), Count of Rochefort, Duke of Montbazon, Prince of Guéméné, Grand Huntsman France, Conseiller d'État, Governor of Dourdan (see lower)

m. Antoinette of Avaugour (?–1681), Viscountess of Guiguen

                                      - Hercule I de Rohan-Guéméné (27/08/1568–16/10/1654 in Couziers), Prince of Guéméné, Duke of Montbazon, Count of Rochefort-en-Yvelines, Prince of Léon; m. (1594) Madeleine of Lenoncourt (1576–28/08/1602)
                                        - Louis VIII de Rohan-Guéméné (05/08/1598–28/02/1667 in Coupvray), Count of Rochefort, Duke of Montbazon, Prince of Guéméné, Grand Huntsman of France, Conseiller d'État, Governor of Dourdan; m. (02/02/1619) Anne de Rohan-Guéméné (20/04/1606 in Saint-Quentin-les-Anges – 13/03/1685 in Rochefort-en-Yvelines), Princess of Guéméné (see above)
                                          - Louis of Rohan-Guéméné a.k.a. the Knight of Rohan (1635–27/11/1674 in Paris), adventurer, Grand Huntsman of France, Colonel of the Guards of Louis XIV
                                          - Charles II de Rohan-Guéméné (1633–1699), Duke of Montbazon, Prince of Guéméné; m. (1653) Jeanne Armande de Schomberg (1632–1706)
                                            - Charles III de Rohan-Guéméné (30/09/1655–10/10/1727), Duke of Montbazon, Prince of Guéméné, Peer of France; m. (19/02/1678) Marie Anne d'Albert (?–1679); m. (30/10/1679) Charlotte Élisabeth de Cochefilet a.k.a. Mademoiselle de Vauvineux (1657–1719)
                                              - Charlotte de Rohan-Guéméné (30/12/1680–20/09/1733); m. (1717) Antoine François Gaspard de Colins (?–1720), Count of Mortagne; m. (1729) Jean Antoine de Créquy (09/11/1699–15/12/1762 in Frohen-le-Grand), Count of Canaples
                                              - Louis Henri de Rohan-Guéméné (October 1681–22/01/1689)
                                              - François-Armand de Rohan-Guéméné (1682–1717), Duke of Montbazon, Prince of Guéméné, brigadier; m. (1698) Louise Julie de La Tour d'Auvergne-Bouillon (1679–1750)
                                                - Charles Jules de Rohan-Guéméné (1700–1703)
                                              - Anne Thérèse de Rohan-Guéméné (1684–1738), Abbess of Jouarre Abbey
                                              - Louis Henri de Rohan-Guéméné (1686–1748), Count of Rochefort-en-Yvelines
                                              - ? de Rohan-Guéméné a.k.a. Mademoiselle de Rochefort (19/11/1687–?)
                                              - Hercule II Mériadec de Rohan-Guéméné (13/11/1688–21/12/1757 in Sainte-Maure), Duke of Montbazon, Prince of Guéméné, Peer of France; m. (1718) Louise Gabrielle Julie de Rohan-Soubise (1704–1741) (see lower)
                                                - Charlotte Louise de Rohan-Guéméné a.k.a. Mademoiselle de Rohan (1722–1786); m. (1737) Vittorio Amedeo Ferrero Fieschi (?–1777), Prince of Masserano
                                                - Geneviève Armande de Rohan-Guéméné (1724–1753), Abbess of Marquette
                                                - Jules Hercule Mériadec de Rohan-Guéméné (25/03/1726 in Paris – 10/12/1788 in Carlsbourg), Duke of Montbazon, Prince of Guéméné; m. (1743) Marie-Louise Henriette de La Tour d'Auvergne (15/08/1725 in Paris – 1793 in Paris), Princess of Guéméné
                                                  - Henri Louis Marie de Rohan-Guéméné (30/08/1745 in Paris – 24/04/1809 in Prague), Prince of Rohan-Guéméné, Duke of Montbazon, Lord of Clisson; m. (15/01/1761) Victoire Armande Josèphe de Rohan-Soubise a.k.a. Madame de Guéméné (28/12/1743–20/09/1807 in Paris), Princess of Maubuisson, Lady of Clisson (see lower)
                                                    - Charlotte Victoire Josèphe Henriette de Rohan-Guéméné (1761–1771)
                                                    - Charles IV Alain Gabriel de Rohan-Guéméné (18/01/1764 in Versailles – 24/04/1836 in Liberec), Duke of Montbazon, Prince of Guéméné, Duke of Bouillon, Lord of Clisson; m. (29/05/1781 in Paris) Louise Aglaé de Conflans d'Armentières (1763–1819)
                                                      - Berthe de Rohan-Guéméné (04/05/1782–22/02/1841); m. (1800) Louis IX Victor Mériadec de Rohan-Guéméné (1766 in Paris – 1846 in Liberec), Prince of Guéméné, Duke of Bouillon (see lower)
                                                    - Marie Louise Joséphine de Rohan-Guéméné (1765 in Paris – 1839); m. (1780) Charles Louis Gaspard de Rohan-Rochefort (1765–1843), Prince of Montaubon (see lower)
                                                    - Louis IX Victor Mériadec de Rohan-Guéméné (1766 in Paris – 1846 in Liberec), Prince of Guéméné, Duke of Bouillon; m. (1800) Berthe de Rohan-Guéméné (04/05/1782–22/02/1841) (see above)
                                                    - Jules Armand Louis de Rohan-Guéméné (1768 in Versailles – 1836 in Liberec); m. (1800) Wilhelmine Biron de Kurland (1781–1839)
                                                - Marie Louise de Rohan-Guéméné (1728–1737)
                                                - Louis-Armand Constantin de Rohan-Guéméné a.k.a. the Knight of Rohan (06/04/1732 in Paris – 27/07/1794 in Paris); m. (1771) Louise Rosalie Le Tonnelier de Breteuil (?–1792)
                                                - Louis René Édouard de Rohan-Guéméné (25/09/1734 in Paris – 17/02/1803 in Ettenheim), Prince of Rohan, Cardinal-Archbishop of Strasbourg, member of the Académie Française, Grand Almoner of the King and head of the Sorbonne
                                                - Ferdinand Maximilien Mériadec de Rohan-Guéméné (07/11/1738–31/10/1813 in Paris), Prince of Rohan-Guéméné, Archbishop of Bordeaux, Prince-Archbishop of Cambrai and Liège, first Almoner of Emperess Joséphine; m. (illegitimate relationship) Charlotte Stuart (29/10/1753–17/11/1789)
                                                  - Marie Victoire de Rohan (1779–1836)
                                                  - Aglaé Clémentine de Rohan (1781–1825)
                                                  - Marie Béatrice de Rohan (1783–1823)
                                                  - Charles Édouard de Rohan a.k.a. the Knight of Roehanstart (1784–28/10/1854 in Perthshire)
                                              - Marie Anne de Rohan-Guéméné (1690–1743), Abbess of Penthemont
                                              - Anne de Rohan-Guéméné (1690–1711), nun
                                              - Élisabeth de Rohan-Guéméné (1691–1753), Abbess of Preaux and Notre-Dame de Marquette
                                              - Charles de Rohan-Guéméné a.k.a. Charles de Rohan-Rochefort (1693–1766), Prince of Rochefort; m. (1722) Éléonore Eugénie de Béthisy de Mézières (1706–1757)
                                                - Rohan-Rochefort branch
                                              - Armand de Rohan-Guéméné (10/02/1695 in Paris – 28/08/1762 in Saverne), Abbot of Gard and Gorze, Duke-Archbishop of Reims, Peer of France
                                              - Charlotte Julie de Rohan-Guéméné (1696–1756), nun
                                              - Louis de Rohan-Guéméné a.k.a. the Cardinal of Rohan (24/03/1697 in Paris – 11/03/1779 in Paris), Bishop of Strasbourg, Cardinal
                                            - Jean-Baptiste de Rohan-Guéméné (1657–1704); m. (1682) Charlotte de Bautru-Nogent (1641–1725)
                                              - Marie Jeanne de Rohan-Guéméné (1683–1710)
                                            - Joseph de Rohan-Guéméné (1659–1669)
                                            - Charlotte de Rohan-Guéméné (1661–1754); m. (May 1688) Guy-Henri Chabot (27/11/1648-06/11/1690), Count of Jarnac, Marquis of Soubran, Lord of Clion-Somsac, de Maroüette et de Grésignac; m. (1691) Pons de Pons (?–1705), Count of Roquefort
                                            - Élisabeth de Rohan-Guéméné (1663–1707); m. (1690) Alexandre de Melun, Count of Melun
                                            - Jeanne de Rohan-Guéméné (?–1728)
                                        - Marie de Rohan-Guéméné (December 1600 in Coupvray – 12/08/1679), Duchess of Luynes and Chevreuse; m. (13/09/1617) Charles d'Albert (05/08/1578 in Pont-Saint-Esprit – 15/12/1621 in Longueville), Marquis of Albert, Duke of Luynes, Grand Constable of France, Peer of France; m. (19/04/1622) Claude de Lorraine a.k.a. Claude de Guise (05/06/1578-24/01/1657), Duke of Chevreuse

m. (05/03/1628) Marie d'Avaugour (1612-28/04/1657 in Paris)

                                        - François de Rohan-Guéméné a.k.a. François de Rohan-Soubise (1630-24/08/1712 in Paris), Prince of Soubise, Count of Rochefort; m. (17/04/1663) Anne de Rohan-Chabot (1648-04/02/1709 in Paris), Princess of Soubise
                                          - Rohan-Soubise branch
                                        - Anne de Rohan-Guéméné (1640–1684); m. (1661) Louis Charles d'Albert de Luynes (1620–1690), Duke of Luynes, Duke of Chevreuse, Prince of Léon
                                        - Marie Éléonore de Rohan-Guéméné (?-08/04/1682), Abbess of Sainte-Trinité, and Malnoue
                                      - Sylvie de Rohan-Guéméné (1570–1651); m. (1594) François d'Espinay (?–1598), Marquis of Broons; m. (1602) Antoine de Sillans (?–1641), Baron of Creuilly
                                      - Marguerite de Rohan-Guéméné (1574–1618); m. (1605) Charles d'Espinay (?-29/01/1607), Marquis of Espinay; m. (1612) Léonard Philibert de Pompadour (?–1634), Viscount of Pompadour
                                      - Alexandre de Rohan-Guéméné (1578–1638); m. (1624) Lucette Tarneau
                                      - Louis VII de Rohan-Guéméné (1562-01/11/1589), Count then Duke of Montbazon, Count of Rochefort, Prince of Guéméné; m. (1581) Madeleine de Lenoncourt (1576-28/08/1602)

m. (1586) Françoise de Montmorency-Laval (?–1614)

                                    - Renée de Rohan-Guéméné; m. François de Rohan-Gié (1515–1559), Lord of Gié and Verger, Viscount of Fronsac, Count of Orbec (see lower); m. (1559) René de Montmorency-Laval a.k.a. René II de Laval-Loué (03/02/1546-08/10/1562), Lord then Baron of Maillé, Lord of Loué, Benais, Montsabert, Marcillé, Parvis, La Rochecorborn, La Haye and Les Écluses; m. (1563) Jean of Montmorency-Laval (25/04/1542-20/09/1578), Count then Marquis of Nesle, Count of Joigny, Viscount of Brosse, Lord then Baron of Bressuire, Lord then Baron of La Motte-Sainte-Heraye, Baron of La Roche-Chabot and L'Isle-sous-Montréal, Marquis of Nesle, Baron then Count of Maillé, Lord of Loué
                                - Françoise de Rohan-Guéméné; m. James of Rohan (1478 - 23/10/1527 in Corlay), Viscount of Rohan and Lord of Léon, Count of Porhoët (see above)
                              - Joan of Rohan-Guéméné; m. (1498) Francis of Chastellier, Viscount of Pommerit
                              - Catherine of Rohan-Guéméné; m. John of Malestroit, Lord of Kerser
                              - Françoise de Rohan-Guéméné, Lady of Marcheville and Varennes; m. Louis of Husson, Count of Tonnerre; m. Francis of Maillé (c. 1465 – May 1501), Viscount of Tours, Baron of Maillé
                              - Henry of Rohan-Guéméné, Lord of Landal; m. (1497) Margaret du Pont-l'Abbé, Lady of Plusquellec, Callac, Trogoff and Coëtanfao
                              - James of Rohan-Guéméné
                            - Peter of Rohan-Guéméné a.k.a. Peter I of Rohan-Gié the Marshal of Gié (1451 in Saint-Quentin-les-Anges – 22/04/1513 in Paris), Lord of Gié, Viscount of Fronsac, Marshal of France; m. (1476) Françoise de Penhoët (1455–1498), Viscountess of Fronsac
                              - Rohan-Gié branch
                                - House of Rohan-Chabot; m. (1503) Margaret of Armagnac (?–1503), Countess of Guise, daughter of Jacques d'Armagnac-Nemours
                            - Helena of Rohan-Guéméné (?–1507); m. Peter du Pont (?–1488), Baron du Pont
                      - Margaret of Rohan (c. 1335 - 14/12/1406); m. (1356) John IV of Beaumanoir (1310–1366), Lord of Beaumanoir, Merdrignac and La Hardouinaye, captain of the castle of Josselin, Marshal of Brittany; m. (c. 1378) Oliver V of Clisson (23/04/1336 in Clisson – 23/04/1407 in Josselin), Lord of Clisson, Viscount of Porhoët, Lord of Blain, Josselin, Belleville, Montaigu, La Garnache, Yerrick and Beauvoir, Baron of Pontchâteau, Grand Constable of France
                      - Peter of Rohan
                    - Geoffrey II of Rohan (? – c. 1377), Bishop of Saint-Brieuc and Vannes; m. (1322) Joanna of Léon (c. 1307 – before 1340), Lady of Châteauneuf-en-Thymerais
                    - Joscelin of Rohan (?–21/03/1388 in Saint-Malo), Bishop of Saint-Malo
                    - Oliver of Rohan (?–20/06/1347)
                    - Thibaut of Rohan
                  - Joanna of Rohan (c. 1280–?); m. (1310) Peter of Kergolay (?–1336)
                  - Beatrice of Rohan; m. John of Beaumanoir, Lord of Merdrignac
                  - James of Rohan; m. (c. 1316) Peronne
                  - Odo of Rohan a.k.a. Odo of Rohan-Gué-de-l'Isle(? – after 1346), Lord of Gué-de-l'Isle; m. Aliette of Coëtlogon, Lady of Gué-de-l'Isle
                    - Rohan-Gué-de-l'Isle branch
                      - Rohan-Polduc branc
                  - Alan of Rohan (?–1299); m. Agnes of Avaugour
                  - Geoffrey of Rohan (?–1299), canon; m. Catherine of Clisson
                  - Joscelin of Rohan (?–1306)
                  - Guiart of Rohan
                - Joan of Rohan (1235–?); m. Harvey IV of Léon (1225–1281), Lord of Léon and Châteauneuf-en-Thymerais
                - Mabilla of Rohan; m. (1251) Robert of Beaumetz, Lord of Beaumetz
                - Vilana of Rohan; m. Richard of La Roche-Jagu, Lord of La Roche-Jagu
                - Tiffany of Rohan; m. Geoffrey II of Lanvaux, Lord of Lanvaux
                - Philippa of Rohan; m. Henry of Avaugour, Lord of Goëlo
                - Geoffrey of Rohan, Lord of Noial
                - Meriadec of Rohan (?–1301), Bishop of Vannes
                - Philip of Rohan
              - Catherine of Rohan; m. Geoffrey of Hennebont, Lord of Hennebont; m. Raoul Niel, Lord of La Muce
              - Heloise of Rohan
            - Constance of Rohan (c. 1170–?); m. [[Odo du Pont a.k.a. Odo I of Pontchâteau (c. 1165 – after 1200), Baron of Pontchâteau
            - William of Rohan (?–1184)
            - Margaret of Rohan; m. (1180) Harvey I of Léon (c. 1165–1208), Lord of Châteauneuf
            - Alix of Rohan; m. Françoise of Corbey
            - Joscelin de Rohan (?–1251), Lord of Montfort(-sur-Meu) et de Noial, Viscount of Rohan; m. Maud of Montfort (c. 1214–1279), Lady of Montfort(-sur-Meu) and Boutavent
              - Rohan-Montauban branch
        - Joscelin of Rohan (?–1127), Lord of Montauban
        - Odo of Rohan

For more detailed branches, see below.

== Branches of the House of Rohan ==
=== Rohan-Guéméné branch ===
Arms of the Rohan-Guéméné branch.

This branch was descended (c. 1375) from John I (1324–1396), Viscount of Rohan, and his wife Joan of Évreux (a.k.a. Joan of Navarre) (1339–1409).

It is named after the town of Guémené-sur-Scorff (Morbihan).

This branch of Rohan-Guéméné still exists through its junior branch, the Rohan-Rochefort family.

Rohan-Guéméné branch

...
│
└──> John I of Rohan (1324–1396), Viscount of Rohan, Lord of Guéméné
     x (1373) Joan of Évreux a.k.a. Joan of Navarre[70] (1339–1409)
     │
     └──> Charles of Rohan, a.k.a. Charles I of Rohan-Guéméné (1375–1438), Lord of Guéméné
          x (1405) Catherine du Guesclin (?–1461)
          │
          └──> Louis I de Rohan-Guéméné (?–15/12/1457 in Saint-Quentin-les-Anges), Lord of Guéméné
               x (07/11/1443) Marie of Montauban[71] (?–1497)
               │
               ├──> Louis II of Rohan-Guéméné "the Great" (c. 1444-25/05/1508), Lord of Guéméné, Baron of Lanvaux, Lord of La Roche-Moysan, Mortiercrolles, Condé-sur-Noireau, Tracy and Vassy
               │    x (12/06/1463) Louise of Rieux[72] (01/03/1446 in Ancenis – ?)
               │    │
               │    ├──> John of Rohan-Guéméné (c. 1475–1524), Lord of Landal, governor of Touraine
               │    │    x Guyonne of Lorgeril (?–1502), Lady of Lorgeril
               │    │    │
               │    │    ├──> Catherine of Rohan-Guéméné (?–1556), Lady of La Ribaudière
               │    │    │    x Tanneguy of Kermaven
               │    │    │    x Gilbert of Limoges
               │    │    │
               │    │    ├──> Margaret of Rohan-Guéméné (?–1550), Lady of Tressant and La Tourniolle
               │    │    │    x Louis of Malestroit, Lord of Pontcallec
               │    │    │
               │    │    ├──> Helena of Rohan-Guéméné (?–1541), Lady of Landal and Lorgeril
               │    │    │    x Francis of Maure[73] (1497–1556), Count of Maure
               │    │    │
               │    │    x Isabeau of La Chapelle (?–1519), Lady of La Chapelle and Molac
               │    │
               │    ├──> Margaret of Rohan-Guéméné (c. 1479-?)
               │    │    x (1490) Francis of Maillé[63] (c. 1465 – May 1501), Viscunt of Tours, Baron of Maillé
               │    │
               │    ├──> Louis III of Rohan-Guéméné (?–1498), Lord of Guéméné
               │    │    x (1482) Renée de Fou
               │    │    │
               │    │    ├──> Louis IV of Rohan-Guéméné (?–1527), Lord of Guéméné
               │    │    │    x (1511) Marie of Rohan (?–1542) (see above)
               │    │    │    │
               │    │    │    └──> Louis V of Rohan-Guéméné (1513–1557), Lord of Guéméné
               │    │    │         x (1529) Margaret of Montfort-Laval[74] (1523-?), Lady of Perrier
               │    │    │         │
               │    │    │         ├──> Louis VI de Rohan-Guéméné (03/04/1540-04/06/1611), Prince of Guéméné, Count of Montbazon
               │    │    │         │    x (22/07/1561) Eleanor of Rohan-Gié (1539–1583), Countess of Rochefort (see below)
               │    │    │         │    │
               │    │    │         │    ├──> Renée of Rohan-Guéméné (1558-?)
               │    │    │         │    │    x (1578) John of Coëtquen (?–1602), Count of Combourg
               │    │    │         │    │
               │    │    │         │    ├──> Lucretia of Rohan-Guéméné (1560-?)
               │    │    │         │    │    x (1574) James of Tournemine (?–1584 in Rennes), Marquis of Coetmeur, Lord of Landinière and Carmelin
               │    │    │         │    │
               │    │    │         │    ├──> Isabella of Rohan-Guéméné (1561-?)
               │    │    │         │    │    x (1593) Nicholas of Pellevé, Count of Flers
               │    │    │         │    │
               │    │    │         │    ├──> Peter of Rohan-Guéméné (1567–1622), Prince of Guéméné, Duke of Montbazon, Baron of Mortiercrolles, Lord of Sainte-Maure
               │    │    │         │    │    x Madeleine of Rieux[75]
               │    │    │         │    │    │
               │    │    │         │    │    ├──> Anne de Rohan-Guéméné (20/04/1606 in Saint-Quentin-les-Anges – 13/03/1685 in Rochefort-en-Yvelines), Princess of Guéméné
               │    │    │         │    │    │    x (02/021619) Louis VIII de Rohan-Guéméné (05/08/1598-28/02/1667 in Coupvray), Count of Rochefort, Duke of Montbazon, Prince of Guéméné, Grand Huntsman of France, Conseiller d'État, governor of Dourdan (see below)
               │    │    │         │    │    │
               │    │    │         │    │    x Antoinette of Avaugour[76] (?–1681), Viscountess of Guiguen
               │    │    │         │    │
               │    │    │         │    ├──> Hercule I de Rohan-Guéméné (27/08/1568–16/10/1654 in Couziers), Prince of Guéméné, Duke of Montbazon, Count of Rochefort-en-Yvelines, Prince of Léon
               │    │    │         │    │    x (1594) Madeleine of Lenoncourt[77] (1576-28/08/1602)
               │    │    │         │    │    │
               │    │    │         │    │    ├──> Louis VIII de Rohan-Guéméné (05/08/1598-28/02/1667 in Coupvray), Count of Rochefort, Duke of Montbazon, Prince of Guéméné, Grand Huntsman of France, conseiller d'État, governor of Dourdan
               │    │    │         │    │    │    x (02/02/1619) Anne de Rohan-Guéméné (20/04/1606 in Saint-Quentin-les-Anges – 13/03/1685 in Rochefort-en-Yvelines), Princess of Guéméné (see above)
               │    │    │         │    │    │    │
               │    │    │         │    │    │    ├──> Louis of Rohan-Guéméné a.k.a. the Knight of Rohan (1635–27/11/1674 in Paris), adventurer, Grand Huntsman of France, Colonel of the Guards of Louis XIV
               │    │    │         │    │    │    │
               │    │    │         │    │    │    └──> Charles II de Rohan-Guéméné (1633–1699), Duke of Montbazon, Prince of Guéméné
               │    │    │         │    │    │         x (1653) Jeanne Armande de Schomberg[78] (1632–1706)
               │    │    │         │    │    │         │
               │    │    │         │    │    │         ├──> Charles III de Rohan-Guéméné (30/09/1655–10/10/1727), Duke of Montbazon, Prince of Guéméné, Peer of France
               │    │    │         │    │    │         │    x (19/02/1678) Marie Anne d'Albert[79] (?–1679)
               │    │    │         │    │    │         │    x (30/10/1679) Charlotte Élisabeth de Cochefilet a.k.a. Mademoiselle de Vauvineux[80] (1657–1719)
               │    │    │         │    │    │         │    │
               │    │    │         │    │    │         │    ├──> Charlotte de Rohan-Guéméné (30/12/1680-20/09/1733)
               │    │    │         │    │    │         │    │    x (1717) Antoine François Gaspard de Colins (?–1720), Count of Mortagne
               │    │    │         │    │    │         │    │    x (1729) Jean Antoine de Créquy[81] (09/11/1699–15/12/1762 in Frohen-le-Grand), Count of Canaples
               │    │    │         │    │    │         │    │
               │    │    │         │    │    │         │    ├──> Louis Henri de Rohan-Guéméné (October 1681-22/01/1689)
               │    │    │         │    │    │         │    │
               │    │    │         │    │    │         │    ├──> François-Armand de Rohan-Guéméné (1682–1717), Duke of Montbazon, Prince of Guéméné, brigadier
               │    │    │         │    │    │         │    │    x (1698) Louise Julie de La Tour d'Auvergne-Bouillon[82] (1679–1750)
               │    │    │         │    │    │         │    │    │
               │    │    │         │    │    │         │    │    └──> Charles Jules de Rohan-Guéméné (1700–1703)
               │    │    │         │    │    │         │    │
               │    │    │         │    │    │         │    ├──> Anne Thérèse de Rohan-Guéméné (1684–1738), Abbess of Jouarre Abbey
               │    │    │         │    │    │         │    │
               │    │    │         │    │    │         │    ├──> Louis Henri de Rohan-Guéméné (1686–1748), Count of Rochefort-en-Yvelines
               │    │    │         │    │    │         │    │
               │    │    │         │    │    │         │    ├──> ? de Rohan-Guéméné a.k.a. Mademoiselle de Rochefort (19/11/1687-?)
               │    │    │         │    │    │         │    │
               │    │    │         │    │    │         │    ├──> Hercule II Mériadec de Rohan-Guéméné (13/11/1688-21/12/1757 in Sainte-Maure), Duke of Montbazon, Prince of Guéméné, Peer of France
               │    │    │         │    │    │         │    │    x (1718) Louise Gabrielle Julie de Rohan-Soubise (1704–1741) (see below)
               │    │    │         │    │    │         │    │    │
               │    │    │         │    │    │         │    │    ├──> Charlotte Louise de Rohan-Guéméné a.k.a. Mademoiselle de Rohan (1722–1786)
               │    │    │         │    │    │         │    │    │    x (1737) Vittorio Amedeo  Ferrero Fieschi (?–1777), Prince of Masserano
               │    │    │         │    │    │         │    │    │
               │    │    │         │    │    │         │    │    ├──> Geneviève de Rohan-Guéméné (1724–1753), Abbess of Marquette
               │    │    │         │    │    │         │    │    │
               │    │    │         │    │    │         │    │    ├──> Jules Hercule Meriadec de Rohan-Guéméné (25/03/1726 in Paris – 10/12/1788 in Carlsbourg), Duke of Montbazon, Prince of Guéméné
               │    │    │         │    │    │         │    │    │    x (1743) Marie-Louise Henriette de La Tour d'Auvergne[83] (15/08/1725 in Paris – 1793 in Paris), Princess of Guéméné
               │    │    │         │    │    │         │    │    │    │
               │    │    │         │    │    │         │    │    │    └──> Henri-Louis-Marie de Rohan-Guéméné (30/08/1745 in Paris – 24/04/1809 in Prague), Prince of Rohan-Guéméné, Duke of Montbazon, Lord of Clisson
               │    │    │         │    │    │         │    │    │         x (15/01/1761) Victoire Armande Joséphe de Rohan-Soubise a.k.a. Madame de Guéméné (28/12/1743-20/09/1807 in Paris), Princess of Maubuisson, Lady of Clisson (see below)
               │    │    │         │    │    │         │    │    │         │
               │    │    │         │    │    │         │    │    │         ├──> Charlotte de Rohan-Guéméné (1761–1771)
               │    │    │         │    │    │         │    │    │         │
               │    │    │         │    │    │         │    │    │         ├──> Charles IV de Rohan-Guéméné (18/01/1764 in Versailles – 24/04/1836 in Liberec), Duke of Montbazon, Prince of Guéméné, Duke of Bouillon, Lord of Clisson
               │    │    │         │    │    │         │    │    │         │    x (29/05/1781 in Paris) Louise Aglaé de Conflans d'Armentières (1763–1819)
               │    │    │         │    │    │         │    │    │         │    │
               │    │    │         │    │    │         │    │    │         │    └──> Berthe de Rohan-Guéméné (04/05/1782-22/02/1841)
               │    │    │         │    │    │         │    │    │         │         x (1800) Louis IX Victor Mériadec de Rohan-Guéméné (1766 in Paris – 1846 in Liberec), Prince of Guéméné, Duke of Bouillon (see below)
               │    │    │         │    │    │         │    │    │         │
               │    │    │         │    │    │         │    │    │         ├──> Marie de Rohan-Guéméné (1765 in Paris – 1839)
               │    │    │         │    │    │         │    │    │         │    x (1780) Charles de Rohan-Rochefort (1765–1843), Prince of Montaubon (see below)
               │    │    │         │    │    │         │    │    │         │
               │    │    │         │    │    │         │    │    │         ├──> Louis IX de Rohan-Guéméné (1766 in Paris – 1846 in Liberec), Prince of Guéméné, Duke of Bouillon
               │    │    │         │    │    │         │    │    │         │    x (1800) Berthe de Rohan-Guéméné (04/05/1782-22/02/1841) (see above)
               │    │    │         │    │    │         │    │    │         │
               │    │    │         │    │    │         │    │    │         └──> Jules de Rohan-Guéméné (1768 in Versailles – 1836 in Liberec)
               │    │    │         │    │    │         │    │    │              x (1800) Wilhelmine Biron de Kurland (1781–1839)
               │    │    │         │    │    │         │    │    │
               │    │    │         │    │    │         │    │    ├──> Marie Louise de Rohan-Guéméné (1728–1737)
               │    │    │         │    │    │         │    │    │
               │    │    │         │    │    │         │    │    ├──> Louis-Armand de Rohan-Guéméné a.k.a. the Knight of Rohan (06/04/1732 in Paris – 27/07/1794 in Paris)
               │    │    │         │    │    │         │    │    │    x (1771) Louise Le Tonnelier de Breteuil[84] (?–1792)
               │    │    │         │    │    │         │    │    │
               │    │    │         │    │    │         │    │    ├──> Louis-René-Édouard de Rohan-Guéméné (25/09/1734 in Paris – 17/02/1803 in Ettenheim), Prince of Rohan, Cardinal-Bishop of Strasbourg, member of the Académie Française, Grand Almoner of the King and Head of the Sorbonne
               │    │    │         │    │    │         │    │    │
               │    │    │         │    │    │         │    │    └──> Ferdinand de Rohan-Guéméné (07/11/1738-31/10/1813 in Paris), Prince of Rohan-Guéméné, Archbishop of Bordeaux, Prince-Archbishop of Cambrai and Liège, first Almoner of Empress Joséphine
               │    │    │         │    │    │         │    │         x (illegitimate relationship) Charlotte Stuart[85] (29/10/1753–17/11/1789)
               │    │    │         │    │    │         │    │         │
               │    │    │         │    │    │         │    │         ├──> Marie Victoire de Rohan (1779–1836)
               │    │    │         │    │    │         │    │         │
               │    │    │         │    │    │         │    │         ├──> Aglaé Clémentine de Rohan (1781–1825)
               │    │    │         │    │    │         │    │         │
               │    │    │         │    │    │         │    │         ├──> Marie Béatrice de Rohan (1783–1823)
               │    │    │         │    │    │         │    │         │
               │    │    │         │    │    │         │    │         └──> Charles Édouard de Rohan a.k.a. the Knight of Roehanstart (1784-28/10/1854 in Perthshire)
               │    │    │         │    │    │         │    │
               │    │    │         │    │    │         │    ├──> Marie Anne de Rohan-Guéméné (1690–1743), Abbess of Pentemont
               │    │    │         │    │    │         │    │
               │    │    │         │    │    │         │    ├──> Anne de Rohan-Guéméné (1690–1711), nun
               │    │    │         │    │    │         │    │
               │    │    │         │    │    │         │    ├──> Élisabeth de Rohan-Guéméné (1691–1753), Abbess of Preaux and Marquette
               │    │    │         │    │    │         │    │
               │    │    │         │    │    │         │    ├──> Charles de Rohan-Guéméné a.k.a. Charles de Rohan-Rochefort (1693–1766), Prince of Rochefort
               │    │    │         │    │    │         │    │    x (1722) Éléonore Eugénie de Béthisy de Mézières (1706–1757)
               │    │    │         │    │    │         │    │    │
               │    │    │         │    │    │         │    │    └──> Rohan-Rochefort family
               │    │    │         │    │    │         │    │
               │    │    │         │    │    │         │    ├──> Armand de Rohan-Guéméné (10/02/1695 in Paris – 28/08/1762 in Saverne), Abbot of Gard and Gorze, Duke-Archbishop of Reims, Peer of France
               │    │    │         │    │    │         │    │
               │    │    │         │    │    │         │    ├──> Charlotte de Rohan-Guéméné (1696–1756), nun
               │    │    │         │    │    │         │    │
               │    │    │         │    │    │         │    └──> Louis de Rohan-Guéméné a.k.a. the Cardinal of Rohan (24/03/1697 in Paris – 11/03/1779 in Paris), Bishop of Strasbourg, cardinal
               │    │    │         │    │    │         │
               │    │    │         │    │    │         ├──> Jean-Baptiste de Rohan-Guéméné (1657–1704)
               │    │    │         │    │    │         │    x (1682) Charlotte de Bautru-Nogent (1641–1725)
               │    │    │         │    │    │         │    │
               │    │    │         │    │    │         │    └──> Marie Jeanne de Rohan-Guéméné (1683–1710)
               │    │    │         │    │    │         │
               │    │    │         │    │    │         ├──> Joseph de Rohan-Guéméné (1659–1669)
               │    │    │         │    │    │         │
               │    │    │         │    │    │         ├──> Charlotte de Rohan-Guéméné (1661–1754)
               │    │    │         │    │    │         │    x (May 1688) Guy-Henri Chabot (27/11/1648-06/11/1690), Count of Jarnac, Marquis of Soubran, Lord of Clion-Somsac, Maroüette and Grésignac
               │    │    │         │    │    │         │    x (1691) Pons de Pons (?–1705), Count of Roquefort
               │    │    │         │    │    │         │
               │    │    │         │    │    │         ├──> Élisabeth de Rohan-Guéméné (1663–1707)
               │    │    │         │    │    │         │    x (1690) Alexandre de Melun, Count of Melun
               │    │    │         │    │    │         │
               │    │    │         │    │    │         └──> Jeanne de Rohan-Guéméné (?–1728)
               │    │    │         │    │    │
               │    │    │         │    │    ├──> Marie de Rohan-Guéméné (December 1600 in Coupvray – 12/08/1679), Duchess of Luynes and Chevreuse
               │    │    │         │    │    │    x (13/09/1617) Charles d'Albert[86] (05/08/1578 in Pont-Saint-Esprit – 15/12/1621 in Longueville), Marquis of Albert, Duke of Luynes, Constable of France, Peer of France
               │    │    │         │    │    │    x (19/04/1622) Claude de Lorraine a.k.a. Claude de Guise[87] (05/06/1578-24/01/1657), Duke of Chevreuse
               │    │    │         │    │    │
               │    │    │         │    │    x (05/03/1628) Marie d'Avaugour[88] (1612-28/04/1657 in Paris)
               │    │    │         │    │    │
               │    │    │         │    │    ├──> François de Rohan-Guéméné a.k.a. François de Rohan-Soubise (1630-24/08/1712 in Paris), Prince of Soubise, Count of Rochefort
               │    │    │         │    │    │    x (17/04/1663) Anne Julie de Rohan-Chabot (1648-04/02/1709 in Paris), Princess of Soubise
               │    │    │         │    │    │    │
               │    │    │         │    │    │    ├──> Rohan-Soubise family
               │    │    │         │    │    │    │
               │    │    │         │    │    │    x Catherine de Lyonne (?–1660)
               │    │    │         │    │    │
               │    │    │         │    │    ├──> Anne de Rohan-Guéméné (1640–1684)
               │    │    │         │    │    │    x (1661) Louis d'Albert de Luynes[89] (1620–1690), Duke of Luynes, Duke of Chevreuse, Prince of Léon
               │    │    │         │    │    │
               │    │    │         │    │    └──> Marie Éléonore de Rohan-Guéméné (?-08/04/1682), Abbess of La Trinité of Caen, Abbess of Malnoue
               │    │    │         │    │
               │    │    │         │    ├──> Sylvie de Rohan-Guéméné (1570–1651)
               │    │    │         │    │    x (1594) François d'Espinay (?–1598), Marquis of Broons
               │    │    │         │    │    x (1602) Antoine de Sillans (?–1641), Baron of Creuilly
               │    │    │         │    │
               │    │    │         │    ├──> Marguerite de Rohan-Guéméné (1574–1618)
               │    │    │         │    │    x (1605) Charles d'Espinay[90] (?-29/01/1607), Marquis d'Espinay
               │    │    │         │    │    x (1612) Léonard Philibert de Pompadour (?–1634), Viscount of Pompadour
               │    │    │         │    │
               │    │    │         │    ├──> Alexandre de Rohan-Guéméné (1578–1638)
               │    │    │         │    │    x (1624) Lucette Tarneau
               │    │    │         │    │
               │    │    │         │    ├──> Louis VII de Rohan-Guéméné (1562-01/11/1589), Count, then Duke of Montbazon, Count of Rochefort, Prince of Guéméné
               │    │    │         │    │    x (1581) Madeleine de Lenoncourt[91] (1576-28/08/1602)
               │    │    │         │    │
               │    │    │         │    x (1586) Françoise de Montmorency-Laval[92] (?–1614)
               │    │    │         │
               │    │    │         └──> Renée de Rohan-Guéméné
               │    │    │              x François de Rohan-Gié (1515–1559), Lord of Gié and Verger, Viscount of Fronsac, Count of Orbec (see below)
               │    │    │              x (1559) René de Montmorency-Laval a.k.a. René II de Laval-Loué[93] (03/02/1546-08/10/1562), Lord, then Baron of Maillé, Lord of Loué, Benais, Montsabert, Marcillé, Le Parvis, La Rochecorborn, La Haye and Les Écluses
               │    │    │              x (1563) Jean de Montmorency-Laval[93] (25/04/1542-20/09/1578), Count, then Marquis of Nesle, Count of Joigny, Viscount of Brosse, Lord, then Baron of Bressuire, Lod, then Baron of La Motte-Sainte-Heraye, Baron of La Roche-Chabot and L'Isle-sous-Montréal, Marquis of Nesle, Baron, then Count of Maillé, Lord of Loué
               │    │    │
               │    │    └──> Françoise de Rohan-Guéméné
               │    │         x James I of Rohan (1478-23/10/1527 in Corlay), Viscount of Rohan and Lord of Léon, Count of Porhoët (see above)
               │    │
               │    ├──> Joan of Rohan-Guéméné
               │    │    x (1498) Francis of Chastellier, Viscount of Pommerit
               │    │
               │    ├──> Catherine of Rohan-Guéméné
               │    │    x John of Malestroit, Lord of Kerser
               │    │
               │    ├──> Françoise of Rohan-Guéméné, Lady of Marcheville and Varennes
               │    │    x Louis of Husson, Count of Tonnerre
               │    │    x Francis of Maillé[63] (c. 1465 – May 1501), Viscount of Tours, Baron of Maillé
               │    │
               │    ├──> Henry of Rohan-Guéméné, Lord of Landal
               │    │    x (1497) Margaret of Pont-l'Abbé, Lady of Plusquellec, Callac, Trogoff and Coëtanfao
               │    │
               │    └──> James of Rohan-Guéméné
               │
               ├──> Peter of Rohan-Guéméné a.k.a. Peter I of Rohan-Gié, or the Marshal of Gié (1451 in Saint-Quentin-les-Anges – 22/04/1513 in Paris), Lord of Gié, Viscount of Fronsac, Marshal of France
               │    x (1476) Françoise of Penhoët (1455–1498), Viscountess of Fronsac
               │    │
               │    ├──> Rohan-Gié family
               │    │         │
               │    │         └──> House of Rohan-Chabot
               │    │
               │    x (1503) Margaret of Armagnac (?–1503), Countess of Guise,[94]
               │
               └──> Helena of Rohan-Guéméné (?–1507)
                    x Pierre du Pont (?–1488), Baron du Pont

=== Rohan-Rochefort branch ===
Arms of the Rohan-Rochefort branch

This family is a junior branch of the Rohan-Guéméné branch through Charles de Rohan-Guémené, a.k.a. Charles de Rohan-Rochefort (1693–1766), who took the title of Prince of Rochefort.

The family of Rohan-Rochefort, which migrated to Austria in the early 19th century, is nowadays the last remaining branch of the House of Rohan. It holds the genuine titles of Duke of Montbazon (1588, France), Duke of Bouillon (1816, Congress of Vienna), Prince of Rohan and Prince of the Holy Roman Empire with the style of Serene Highness (Durchlaucht), confirmed in 1808 by Emperor Francis II for all the members of the family. The head of the family was (since 1861) a hereditary member of the House of Lords of Austria.

Rohan-Rochefort branch

...
│
└──> Charles III de Rohan-Guéméné (30/09/1655–10/10/1727), Duke of Montbazon, Prince of Guéméné, Peer of France
     x (30/10/1679) Charlotte Élisabeth de Cochefilet (1657–1719), a.k.a. Mademoiselle de Vauvineux, daughter of Charles de Cochefilet, Count of Vauvineux 
     │
     └──> Charles de Rohan-Guéméné a.k.a. Charles de Rohan-Rochefort (1693–1766), Prince of Rochefort and Montauban
          x (1722) Éléonore Eugénie de Béthisy de Mézières (1706–1757)
          │
          ├──> Éléonore de Rohan-Rochefort (1728–1792)
          │    x (1742) Jean de Mérode (?–1763), Count of Mérode
          │
          ├──> Charles Jules de Rohan-Rochefort (1729–1811)
          │    x (1762) Marie Henriette d'Orléans-Rothelin (1744-?)
          │    │
          │    ├──> Charles Mériadec de Rohan-Rochefort (1763–1764)
          │    │
          │    ├──> Charles de Rohan-Rochefort (1765–1843), Prince of Montauban
          │    │    x (1780) Marie Louise Joséphine de Rohan-Guéméné (1765 in Paris – 1839) (see above)
          │    │    │
          │    │    ├──> Hermine de Rohan-Rochefort (1785–1843)
          │    │    │    x (1809) Gabriel Joseph de Froment (1747–1826), Baron of Castille
          │    │    │
          │    │    ├──> Armande Louise de Rohan-Rochefort (1787–1864)
          │    │    │    x (1806) Alexandre de Pierre de Bernis (1777–1845), Marquis of Pierre de Bernis
          │    │    │
          │    │    ├──> Gasparine de Rohan-Rochefort (1798–1871)
          │    │    │    x (07/01/1822 in Prague) Heinrich XIX Reuss zu Greiz (01/03/1790 in Offenbach-sur-le-Main – 31/10/1836 in Greiz)
          │    │    │
          │    │    ├──> Camille de Rohan-Rochefort (1800–1892), Prince of Guéméné
          │    │    │    x (1826) Adelheid von Löwenstein-Wertheim-Rosemberg (1806–1884)
          │    │    │
          │    │    └──> Benjamin de Rohan-Rochefort (1804–1846)
          │    │         x (1825) Stéphanie de Croÿ (1805–1884)
          │    │         │
          │    │         ├──> Arthur de Rohan-Rochefort (1826–1885)
          │    │         │    x (1850) Gabrielle von Waldstein-Wartenberg (1827–1890)
          │    │         │    │
          │    │         │    ├──> Karl de Rohan-Rochefort (1851–1852)
          │    │         │    │
          │    │         │    ├──> Alain I de Rohan-Rochefort (1853–1914), Prince of Guéméné
          │    │         │    │    x (1885) Johanna d'Auersperg (1860–1922)
          │    │         │    │    │
          │    │         │    │    ├──> Gabrielle de Rohan-Rochefort (1887–1917)
          │    │         │    │    │
          │    │         │    │    ├──> Berthe de Rohan-Rochefort (1889–1977)
          │    │         │    │    │    x (1920) Ottokar Picot de Peccaduc (1888–1965), baron de Herzogenburg
          │    │         │    │    │
          │    │         │    │    ├──> Johanna de Rohan-Rochefort (1890–1961)
          │    │         │    │    │    x (1922) Rudolf von Colloredo-Mansfeld (?–1948), comte de Colloredo-Mansfeld
          │    │         │    │    │
          │    │         │    │    ├──> Alain II de Rohan-Rochefort (1893–1976), Prince of Guéméné
          │    │         │    │    │    x (1921) Marguerite von Schoenburg-Hartenstein (1897–1980)
          │    │         │    │    │    │
          │    │         │    │    │    ├──> Marie Jeanne de Rohan-Rochefort (1922)
          │    │         │    │    │    │    x (1948) Pierre Naquet
          │    │         │    │    │    │
          │    │         │    │    │    ├──> Marguerite de Rohan-Rochefort (1923)
          │    │         │    │    │    │    x (1945) Kunata Kottulinsky, comte Kottulinsky
          │    │         │    │    │    │
          │    │         │    │    │    ├──> Mabile de Rohan-Rochefort (1924–1982)
          │    │         │    │    │    │    x (1952) Richard de Belcredi
          │    │         │    │    │    │
          │    │         │    │    │    ├──> Adélaïde de Rohan-Rochefort (1927–1931)
          │    │         │    │    │    │
          │    │         │    │    │    ├──> Gabrielle de Rohan-Rochefort (1929–10/02/1991)
          │    │         │    │    │    │    x (26/01/1953) Louis Cottafavi (07/03/1917)
          │    │         │    │    │    │
          │    │         │    │    │    ├──> Aliette de Rohan-Rochefort (1930–1968)
          │    │         │    │    │    │
          │    │         │    │    │    └──> Josseline de Rohan-Rochefort (1934)
          │    │         │    │    │         x (1958) Viktor Gottfried Riedl
          │    │         │    │    │
          │    │         │    │    ├──> Marie de Rohan-Rochefort (1893–1966)
          │    │         │    │    │
          │    │         │    │    └──> Karl Anton de Rohan-Rochefort (1898–1975)
          │    │         │    │         x (1933) Marie Apponyi (1899–1967)
          │    │         │    │         │
          │    │         │    │         ├──> Charles V de Rohan-Rochefort (1934–2008), Prince of Guéméné
          │    │         │    │         │    x (1963) Ingeborg Irnberger (1939)
          │    │         │    │         │    │
          │    │         │    │         │    └──> Charlotte de Rohan-Rochefort (1966)
          │    │         │    │         │
          │    │         │    │         └──> Albert de Rohan-Rochefort a.k.a. Albert Rohan (09/05/1936 in Melk-2019), Prince of Guéméné, Austrian diplomat
          │    │         │    │              x (1985) Elisabeth Burghardt (1948-03/08/1994)
          │    │         │    │
          │    │         │    ├──> Joseph de Rohan-Rochefort (1854–1926)
          │    │         │    │    x (1883) Elisabeth Pejacsevich (1860–1884)
          │    │         │    │    x (1891) Anna Lincke (1857–1925)
          │    │         │    │    │
          │    │         │    │    ├──> Stéphanie de Rohan-Rochefort (1892–1908)
          │    │         │    │    │
          │    │         │    │    ├──> Joséphine de Rohan-Rochefort (1893–1984)
          │    │         │    │    │    x (1922) Friedrich Willner (1887 in Vienna – 1961)
          │    │         │    │    │    │
          │    │         │    │    │    ├──> Frederick (Friedrich) de Rohan Willner (1923-?)
          │    │         │    │    │    │    x (1951) Edle Stranger (?-2000)
          │    │         │    │    │    │    │
          │    │         │    │    │    │    └──> Guy de Rohan Willner
          │    │         │    │    │    │         x Laurence Guerre
          │    │         │    │    │    │         │
          │    │         │    │    │    │         ├──> Maud de Rohan Willner
          │    │         │    │    │    │         │
          │    │         │    │    │    │         ├──> Constance de Rohan Willner
          │    │         │    │    │    │         │
          │    │         │    │    │    │         ├──> Hugo Jonathan de Rohan Willner
          │    │         │    │    │    │         │
          │    │         │    │    │    │         ├──> Olaf Christophe de Rohan Willner
          │    │         │    │    │    │         │
          │    │         │    │    │    │         └──> Astrid Valerie de Rohan Willner
          │    │         │    │    │    │
          │    │         │    │    │    └──> Peter de Rohan Willner (1927)
          │    │         │    │    ├──> Joseph de Rohan-Rochefort (1895–1931)
          │    │         │    │    │    x (1922) Dilkuska Wrench
          │    │         │    │    │
          │    │         │    │    ├──> Marie de Rohan-Rochefort (1900–1907)
          │    │         │    │    │
          │    │         │    │    └──> Marguerite de Rohan-Rochefort (1905–?)
          │    │         │    │
          │    │         │    ├──> Victor de Rohan-Rochefort (1856–1882)
          │    │         │    │
          │    │         │    ├──> Benjamin de Rohan-Rochefort (1858–1889)
          │    │         │    │
          │    │         │    ├──> Ernest de Rohan-Rochefort (1863–1895)
          │    │         │    │
          │    │         │    ├──> Édouard de Rohan-Rochefort (1867–1892)
          │    │         │    │
          │    │         │    └──> Marie-Berthe Françoise Félicie Jeanne de Rohan-Rochefort (21/05/1868 in Teplice – 19/01/1945 in Vienna)
          │    │         │         x (29/04/1894 in Prague) Charles de Bourbon (30/03/1848 in Ljubljana – 18/07/1909 in Varese), Duke of Madrid, heir to the royal throne of France, son of Jean de Bourbon (15/05/1822 in Aranjuez – 19/11/1887 in Hove), Count Montizón, heir to the royal throne of France
          │    │         │
          │    │         ├──> Victor de Rohan-Rochefort (1827–1889)
          │    │         │    x (1872) Maria von Degenfeld-Schonburg (1851–1924)
          │    │         │
          │    │         ├──> Alain de Rohan-Rochefort (1829–1857)
          │    │         │
          │    │         ├──> Louis de Rohan-Rochefort (1833–1891)
          │    │         │    x (1860) Hélène d'Auersperg (1836–1897)
          │    │         │    │
          │    │         │    ├──> Raoul de Rohan-Rochefort (1860–1931)
          │    │         │    │    x (1888) Agnès Rock (1865–1926)
          │    │         │    │    │
          │    │         │    │    ├──> Marie de Rohan-Rochefort (1891–1977)
          │    │         │    │    │
          │    │         │    │    ├──> Oscar de Rohan-Rochefort (1892–1918)
          │    │         │    │    │
          │    │         │    │    ├──> Charles de Rohan-Rochefort (1894–1965)
          │    │         │    │    │    x (1923) Marie Anna Edle de Hardtmuth (1903–1994)
          │    │         │    │    │    │
          │    │         │    │    │    ├──> Charles de Rohan-Rochefort (1924)
          │    │         │    │    │    │    x (1949) Nancy Southgate-Jones (1927)
          │    │         │    │    │    │    │
          │    │         │    │    │    │    ├──> Élisabeth de Rohan-Rochefort (1951)
          │    │         │    │    │    │    │    x (1974) Kurt Valley (1951)
          │    │         │    │    │    │    │
          │    │         │    │    │    │    ├──> Raoul de Rohan-Rochefort, Duke of Bouillon and Montbazon (1954)
          │    │         │    │    │    │    │    x (1985) Patricia Ann Price (1950)
          │    │         │    │    │    │    │    │
          │    │         │    │    │    │    │    ├──> Catherine de Rohan-Rochefort (1989)
          │    │         │    │    │    │    │    │
          │    │         │    │    │    │    │    └──> Marie de Rohan-Rochefort (1992)
          │    │         │    │    │    │    │
          │    │         │    │    │    │    ├──> Geoffroy de Rohan-Rochefort (1958)
          │    │         │    │    │    │    │    x (1981) Hélène Louise du Bosc (1958)
          │    │         │    │    │    │    │    │
          │    │         │    │    │    │    │    ├──> Rembert de Rohan-Rochefort (1986)
          │    │         │    │    │    │    │    │
          │    │         │    │    │    │    │    └──> Corinne de Rohan-Rochefort (1989)
          │    │         │    │    │    │    │
          │    │         │    │    │    │    x (1975) Virginia Putnam Durrell (1938)
          │    │         │    │    │    │
          │    │         │    │    │    ├──> Louis de Rohan-Rochefort (1927–1975)
          │    │         │    │    │    │    x (1957) Félicité Ortner (1932)
          │    │         │    │    │    │    │
          │    │         │    │    │    │    ├──> Anne de Rohan-Rochefort (1959)
          │    │         │    │    │    │    │    x (1983) Hugh Buchanan (1958)
          │    │         │    │    │    │    │
          │    │         │    │    │    │    ├──> Charles de Rohan-Rochefort (1961)
          │    │         │    │    │    │    │    x (1989) Sarah Margerrison (1962)
          │    │         │    │    │    │    │    │
          │    │         │    │    │    │    │    ├──> Georgia de Rohan-Rochefort (31/03/1993)
          │    │         │    │    │    │    │    │
          │    │         │    │    │    │    │    └──> Éléonore de Rohan-Rochefort (03/09/1995)
          │    │         │    │    │    │    │
          │    │         │    │    │    │    └──> Marie Louise de Rohan-Rochefort (08/02/1967)
          │    │         │    │    │    │         x (11/06/1994) William Robert Shaw (08/09/1964)
          │    │         │    │    │    │
          │    │         │    │    │    └──> Raoul de Rohan-Rochefort (1932–2023)[95]
          │    │         │    │    │         x (1962) Annette Morley (1941)
          │    │         │    │    │         │
          │    │         │    │    │         ├──> Nicolas de Rohan-Rochefort (1966)
          │    │         │    │    │         │
          │    │         │    │    │         ├──> Anuschka de Rohan-Rochefort (1968)
          │    │         │    │    │         │
          │    │         │    │    │         ├──> Louis de Rohan-Rochefort (1970)
          │    │         │    │    │         │
          │    │         │    │    │         └──> Philippe de Rohan-Rochefort (1970)
          │    │         │    │    │
          │    │         │    │    ├──> Thérèse de Rohan-Rochefort (1896–1977)
          │    │         │    │    │    x (1923) Adolf Ritter Weiss de Tessbach (1897–1979)
          │    │         │    │    │
          │    │         │    │    ├──> Raoul de Rohan-Rochefort (1897–1961)
          │    │         │    │    │    x (1925) Ilona Marie Luzsensky (1906-?)
          │    │         │    │    │    │
          │    │         │    │    │    ├──> Béatrix de Rohan-Rochefort (1926)
          │    │         │    │    │    │    x Vaclav Rysava
          │    │         │    │    │    │
          │    │         │    │    │    ├──> Henry de Rohan-Rochefort (1930–1955)
          │    │         │    │    │    │
          │    │         │    │    │    └──> Marie Antoinette de Rohan-Rochefort
          │    │         │    │    │         x (1960) Karl Helmer (1935)
          │    │         │    │    │
          │    │         │    │    └──> Clotilde de Rohan-Rochefort (1901–1957)
          │    │         │    │         x (1927) Otto Ritter Weiss de Tessbach (1898–1945)
          │    │         │    │
          │    │         │    ├──> Josselin de Rohan-Rochefort (1862–1864)
          │    │         │    │
          │    │         │    ├──> Louis de Rohan-Rochefort (1865–1887)
          │    │         │    │
          │    │         │    └──> Stéphanie de Rohan-Rochefort (1868–1898)
          │    │         │         x (1896) Alekséï Troubetzkoï
          │    │         │
          │    │         └──> Benjamin de Rohan-Rochefort (1835–1900)
          │    │              x (1886) Ameline Julie Marie Mahe de Kerouant (1828–1905)
          │    │
          │    ├──> Charlotte de Rohan-Rochefort (25/10/1767–01/05/1841)
          │    │    x (18/02/1804 in Baden) Louis-Antoine de Bourbon-Condé (02/08/1772 in Chantilly – 21/03/1804 in Vincennes), Duke of Enghien, son of Louis VI de Bourbon-Condé (13/04/1756 in Hôtel de Condé – 27/08/1830), Prince of Condé, and Bathilde d'Orléans (09/07/1750 in Saint-Cloud - 10/01/1822 in Paris) 
          │    │
          │    ├──> Louis de Rohan-Rochefort (1770–1794)
          │    │
          │    └──> Clémentine de Rohan-Rochefort (1786–1850)
          │         x François Louis de Gaudechart (?–1832), Marquis of Querrieux
          │
          ├──> Louise de Rohan-Rochefort (1734–1815)
          │    x (1748) Louis de Lorraine a.k.a. Louis III de Guise (1725–1761), son of Louis de Lorraine a.k.a. Louis II de Guise (1692–1743), Prince of Lambesc, Count of Braine, and Jeanne Marguerite de Durfort (1691–1750)
          │
          └──> Eugène de Rohan-Rochefort (1737–?)

=== Rohan-Soubise branch ===
Arms of the Rohan-Soubise branch.

This family descended from the Rohan-Guéméné branch in 1630, with the estates of Soubise (in Poitou) and the Parc-Soubise (in Mouchamps, Vendée) coming from the Rohan-Chabot family through an alliance between the two branches.

Charles de Rohan-Soubise, a.k.a. the Marshal of Soubise (1715–1787), Prince of Soubise and Marshal of France, and his daughter Charlotte Godefride Élisabeth de Rohan-Soubise (1737–1760), wife of the Prince of Condé Louis V Joseph de Bourbon-Condé (1736–1818), belonged to this branch of the family.

From 1717 onward, the head of this branch was styled Duke of Rohan-Rohan. For Hercule Mériadec de Rohan-Soubise (1669–1749), the estate of Frontenay-l'Abattu (département of Deux-Sèvres, Poitou) was erected in 1717 into a pairie-duché called the Duchy of Rohan-Rohan, to differentiate it from the title of Duke of Rohan held by the House of Rohan-Chabot.

This branch became extinct in the Rohan-Guéméné family in 1807.

Rohan-Soubise branch

...
│
└──> Hercule I de Rohan-Guéméné (27/08/1568–16/10/1654 in Couziers), Prince of Guéméné, Duke of Montbazon, Count of Rochefort-en-Yvelines, Prince of Léon
     x (05/03/1628) Marie d'Avaugour, Duchess of Montbazon[96] (1612-28/04/1657 in Paris)
     │
     └──> François de Rohan-Guéméné a.k.a. François de Rohan-Soubise (1630-24/08/1712 in Paris), Prince of Soubise, Count of Rochefort
          x (17/04/1663) Anne Julie de Rohan-Chabot (1648-04/02/1709 in Paris), Princess of Soubise
          │
          ├──> Anne Marguerite de Rohan-Soubise (05/08/1664-26/06/1721)
          │
          ├──> Louis de Rohan-Soubise (11/03/1666-05/11/1689)
          │
          ├──> Constance Émilie de Rohan-Soubise (1667-?)
          │    x (1683) José I Rodriguez Tellez da Camara (?–1724), Count of Ribeyra-Grande
          │
          ├──> Hercule Mériadec de Rohan-Soubise (08/05/1669-26/01/1749 in Paris), Duke of Rohan-Rohan, Prince of Soubise and Maubuisson
          │    x (15/02/1694) Anne Geneviève de Lévis-Ventadour (February 1673 – 20/03/1727 in Paris), daughter of Louis Charles de Lévis (1647-28/09/1717 in Paris), Duke of Ventadour, and Charlotte Éléonore Magdeleine de La Mothe-Houdancourt (1654–13/12/1739 in Versailles)
          │    │
          │    ├──> Charlotte de Rohan-Soubise (1696–1733)
          │    │
          │    ├──> Jules François Louis de Rohan-Soubise (16/01/1697 in Paris – 06/05/1724 in Paris), Prince of Soubise, Captain lieutenant of the Gendarmes of the King's guard
          │    │    x (16/09/1714 in Paris) Anne-Julie Adélaïde de Melun (1698–18/05/1724 in Paris), Princess of Soubise, daughter of Louis I de Melun (27/10/1673–24/09/1704), Prince of Épinoy, and Élisabeth Thérèse de Lorraine (1664–1748), Lady of Villemareuil, Vaucourtois and Saint-Jean-les-Deux-Jumeaux
          │    │    │
          │    │    ├──> Charles de Rohan-Soubise a.k.a. the Marshal of Soubise (16/07/1715 in Versailles – 01/07/1787 in Paris), Prince of Soubise and Épinoy, Duke of Rohan-Rohan, Ventadour and Goëlo, Count of Saint-Pol, Lord of Roberval and Clisson, minister of the kings Louis XV and Louis XVI, Marshal of France
          │    │    │    x (28/12/1734) Anne Marie Louise de La Tour d'Auvergne (01/08/1722 in Paris – 19/09/1739 in Paris), daughter of Emmanuel Théodose de La Tour d'Auvergne (1668 – April 1730), Duke of Bouillon, and Anne Marie Christiane de Simiane
          │    │    │    │
          │    │    │    ├──> Charlotte de Rohan-Soubise (07/10/1737–04/03/1760), Princess of Condé
          │    │    │    │    x (03/05/1753) Louis V Joseph de Bourbon-Condé the Duke (09/08/1736 in Paris – 13/05/1818 in Chantilly), Prince of Condé, Grand Master of France, Lieutenant general of the King's armies, Colonel-General of the Infantry, Baron of Châteaubriant, son Louis IV Henri de Bourbon-Condé (18/08/1692 in Versailles – 27/01/1740 in Chantilly), Prince of Condé, Duke of Bourbon, Enghien and Guise, Prince of Léon, Duke of Bellegarde, Count of Sancerre, Baron of Châteaubriant, and Landgravine Caroline of Hesse-Rotenburg (18/08/1714 in Rotenburg an der Fulda – 23/07/1741 in Paris)
          │    │    │    │
          │    │    │    ├──> ? de Rohan-Soubise (1739–1742), Count of Saint-Pol
          │    │    │    │
          │    │    │    x (1741) Anne Thérèse de Savoie-Carignano (01/11/1717 in Paris – 05/04/1745 in Paris), daughter of Victor Amadeus I of Savoy-Carignano (29/02/1690 in Turin – 04/04/1741 in Turin), Prince of Carignan, and Maria Vittoria Francesca of Savoy (1690–1766)
          │    │    │    │
          │    │    │    ├──> Victoire Armande Joséphe de Rohan-Soubise a.k.a. Madame de Guéméné (28/12/1743-20/09/1807 in Paris), Princess of Maubuisson, Lady of Clisson
          │    │    │    │    x (15/01/1761) Henri Louis Marie de Rohan-Guéméné (30/08/1745 in Paris – 24/04/1809 in Prague), Prince of Rohan-Guéméné, Duke of Montbazon, Lord of Clisson (see above)
          │    │    │    │
          │    │    │    ├──> Eugène de Rohan-Soubise (?–1785), Count of Villafranca
          │    │    │    │    x ?
          │    │    │    │    │
          │    │    │    │    └──> Joseph de Rohan-Soubise (?–1825)
          │    │    │    │         x ?
          │    │    │    │         │
          │    │    │    │         └──> Eugène de Rohan-Soubise (?–1888)
          │    │    │    │
          │    │    │    x (1745) Anna Viktoria Maria Christina von Hessen-Rheinfels Rotenburg (1728–1792), daughter of Josef von Hessen-Rheinfels Rotenburg
          │    │    │
          │    │    ├──> François Armand de Rohan-Soubise (01/12/1717 in Paris – 28/06/1756 in Saverne), Bishop of Strasbourg, Cardinal, member of the Académie Française
          │    │    │
          │    │    ├──> Marie Louise de Rohan-Soubise a.k.a. Madame de Marsan (07/01/1720 in Paris – 04/03/1803 in Ratisbonne), Countess of Marsan, Governess of the Children of France
          │    │    │    x (04/06/1736 in Paris) Gaston de Lorraine (1721–1743), Count of Marsan and Walhaim
          │    │    │    x (relation after 1743) Louis Guillaume Le Monnier (27/06/1717 in Paris – 07/09/1799), botanist
          │    │    │
          │    │    ├──> François Auguste de Rohan-Soubise (16/09/1721-06/08/1736), Count of Tournon
          │    │    │
          │    │    └──> René de Rohan-Soubise (26/071723–07/02/1743), Abbot of Luxeuil
          │    │
          │    ├──> Louise de Rohan-Soubise (1699–1755)
          │    │    x (1717) Guy Paul Jules de La Porte-Mazarin (1701–1738), Duke of Rethel-Mazarin, son of Paul Jules de La Porte-Mazarin (1666–1731), and Félicie Charlotte Armande de Durfort-Duras (c. 1672–1730)
          │    │
          │    ├──> Marie Isabelle de Rohan-Soubise (1699–1754)
          │    │    x (1713) Joseph de La Baume (?–1755)
          │    │
          │    ├──> Louise de Rohan-Soubise (1704–1741)
          │    │    x (1718) Hercule II Mériadec de Rohan-Guéméné (13/11/1688-21/12/1757 in Sainte-Maure), Duke of Montbazon, Prince of Guéméné, Peer of France (see above)
          │    │
          │    x (02/09/1732) Marie Sophie Égon de Courcillon (1713–1756), daughter of Philippe Égon de Courcillon, and Sophia de Löwenstein-Wertheim-Rochefort
          │
          ├──> Alexandre de Rohan-Soubise (19/07/1670-09/03/1687)
          │
          ├──> Henri de Rohan-Soubise (04/01/1672-30/07/1693)
          │
          ├──> Armand de Rohan-Soubise (26/06/1674 in Paris – 19/07/1749 in Paris), Prince of Rohan, Cardinal of Rohan-Soubise, Bishop of Strasbourg, member of the Académie Française, Grand Almoner of France (his real biological father is said to be King Louis XIV)
          │
          ├──> Sophronie de Rohan-Soubise (02/07/1678-?)
          │    x (1694) Alfonso Francisco de Vasconcellos (?–1732), Count of Calhete
          │
          ├──> Éléonore Marie de Rohan-Soubise (25/08/1679–02/11/1753), Abbess of Origny
          │
          ├──> Maximilien de Rohan-Soubise (1680–23/05/1706 in Ramilies)
          │
          ├──> Frédéric de Rohan-Soubise (1682–?)
          │
          x Catherine de Lyonne (?–1660)

=== Rohan-Gié branch ===
Arms of the Rohan-Gié branch.

This family is descended from the Rohan-Guéméné branch in 1541. It is named after the town of Gyé-sur-Seine (Aube).

Peter II of Rohan-Gié (†1525) married in 1517 Anne of Rohan (1485–1529) heiress of the eldest branch, and through this marriage became Viscount of Rohan, Lord of Léon and Count of Porhoët. His son, René of Rohan-Gié (1516–1552) married in 1534 Isabeau of Albret, a.k.a. Isabeau de Navarre (1512–1570) and was the father of René II, Viscount of Rohan and Lord of Léon († 1586) head of the Protestant party in France.

This branch became extinct in 1638 with Henry II of Rohan first Duke of Rohan (1603), who married Marguerite de Béthune (1595–1660), daughter of Maximilien I de Béthune-Sully (1559–1641). His only daughter Marguerite de Rohan (1617–1684) married in 1645 Henri Chabot (1615–1655) and gave birth to the Rohan-Chabot family.

Rohan-Gié branch

...
│
└──> Louis I de Rohan-Guéméné (?–15/12/1457 in Saint-Quentin-les-Anges), Lord of Guéméné
     x (07/11/1443) Marie of Montauban (?–1497)
     │
     ├──> Peter of Rohan-Guéméné a.k.a. Peter I of Rohan-Gié the Marshal of Gié (1451 in Saint-Quentin-les-Anges – 22/04/1513 in Paris), Lord of Gié, Viscount of Fronsac, Marshal of France
     │    x (1476) Françoise of Penhoët (1455–1498), Viscountess of Fronsac
     │    │
     │    ├──> Peter II of Rohan Gié (?–1525), Lord of Blain, Frontenay, La Marche and Gié, Viscount of Carentan
     │    │    x (25/09/1515) Anne of Rohan (1485-05/04/1529 in Blain), Viscountess of Rohan (see above)
     │    │    │
     │    │    └──> René of Rohan-Gié a.k.a. René I of Rohan (1516-20/10/1552 in Metz), Viscount of Rohan, Prince of Léon, Count of Porhoët, Marquis of Blain, Lord of Beauvoir and La Garnache, Knight of the King's Order and captain of a compagnie d'ordonnance
     │    │         x (1534) Isabella of Albret a.k.a. "Isabella of Navarre" (1512 – c. 1570), Infante of Navarre, daughter of John III of Albret a.k.a. "John III of Navarre" (1469–17/06/1516 in Monein), King of Navarre, and Catherine of Foix a.k.a. "Catherine I of Navarre" (1468–12/02/1517 in Mont-de-Marsan), Queen of Navarre
     │    │         │
     │    │         ├──> Henry I of Rohan (1535–12/06/1575), Viscount of Rohan, Count of Porhoët, Prince du sang of Navarre
     │    │         │    x (15/02/1566) Françoise of Tournemine (?–1609), daughter of René of Tournemine, Lord of La Hunaudaye
     │    │         │    │
     │    │         │    └──> Judith of Rohan (1567-24/06/1575)
     │    │         │
     │    │         ├──> Françoise of Rohan (c. 1540 – December 1591 in Beauvoir-sur-Mer), Lady of La Garnache, Duchess of Loudun and Nemours
     │    │         │    x (1557) James of Savoy-Nemours (12/10/1531 in Vauluisant – 15/06/1585 in Annecy), Duke of Nemours, son of Philip of Savoie-Nemours (1490 in Bourg-en-Bresse – 25/10/1533 in Marseille), Duke of Nemours, Count of Geneva, and Charlotte of Orléans-Longueville (1512–1549)
     │    │         │    x (1586) François Lesfelle
     │    │         │
     │    │         ├──> René II of Rohan (1550–1586), Viscount of Rohan, Prince of Léon, Count of Porhoët, Lord of Pontivy, Blain and Ploërmel
     │    │         │    x (1578) Catherine de Parthenay-L'Archevêque (22/03/1554 in Mouchamps – 26/10/1631 in Mouchamps), Regent-Lady of Blain, Dowager Viscountess of Rohan, daughter of John V of Parthenay-L'Archevêque (1512–01/09/1566 in Mouchamps), Lord of Mouchamps, and Antoinette Henriette Bouchard of Aubeterre (1535–1580), Dowager Lady of Soubise
     │    │         │    │
     │    │         │    ├──> Henriette de Rohan the Crookbacked (1577–1629)
     │    │         │    │
     │    │         │    ├──> Catherine of Rohan (1578–1607), Duchess of Zweibruecken
     │    │         │    │    x (1604) Johann II of Zweibrücken (?–1635), Duke of Zweibruecken, Count Palatine of the Rhine
     │    │         │    │
     │    │         │    ├──> Henry II of Rohan (25/08/1579 in Blain – 28/02/1638 in Geneva), Viscount then Duke of Rohan, Prince of Léon, Lord of Blain, generalissimo of the Protestant armies, Ambassador of France, Colonel-General of the Swiss and Grisons
     │    │         │    │    x (1605) Marguerite de Béthune-Sully (1595–1660), daughter of Maximilien I de Béthune-Sully (13/12/1559 in Rosny-sur-Seine – 22/12/1641 in Villebon), Duke of Sully, minister of Henry IV, Marshal of France, and Rachel de Cochefilet (1556–1659)
     │    │         │    │    │
     │    │         │    │    ├──> Marguerite de Rohan (1617–09/04/1684 in Paris), Duchess of Rohan and Frontenay, Princess of Léon, Coutness of Porhoët, Marchionness of Blain and La Garnache, Lady of Lorges
     │    │         │    │    │    x (06/06/1645 in Paris) Henri Chabot (c. 1615–27/02/1655 in Chanteloup), Lord of Jarnac, Apremont and Saint-Aulaye, Duke of Rohan, Prince of Léon, Count of Porhoët and Lorges, Marquis of Blain and La Garnache, Baron of Mouchamps, Lord of Héric and Fresnay (in Plessé), governor and lieutenant-general of Anjou[97]
     │    │         │    │    │    │
     │    │         │    │    │    └──> House of Rohan-Chabot
     │    │         │    │    │
     │    │         │    │    └──> Tancrède de Rohan (1630–1649 in Paris) (His biological father is Louis Charles Nogaret de La Valette de Foix a.k.a. the Fair Candale (1627-28/01/1658), Duke of Candale)
     │    │         │    │
     │    │         │    ├──> Benjamin de Rohan a.k.a. the Duke of Soubise (1583-09/10/1642 in London), Duke of Frontenay, Baron of Soubise
     │    │         │    │
     │    │         │    └──> Anne of Rohan (1584–20/09/1646), poetess
     │    │         │
     │    │         ├──> John of Rohan a.k.a. Frontenay (?–1574)
     │    │         │    x Diana of Barbançon-Cany
     │    │         │
     │    │         └──> Louis of Rohan, Lord of Gié
     │    │
     │    ├──> Charles of Rohan-Gié (c. 1478–06/05/1528), Lord of Gié, Viscount of Fronsac, Count of Guise and Orbec
     │    │    x (24/02/1504) Charlotte of Armagnac (? – August 1504), Duchess of Nemours and Countess of Guise, daughter of James of Armagnac (1433–04/08/1477 in Paris), Duke of Nemours, Count of La Marche, and Louise of Anjou (1445–1477 in Carlat)
     │    │    x Giovanna di Sanseverino-Bisignan, daughter of Bernardino di Sanseverino (1470–1517), Prince of Bisignan, and Giovanna Eleonora Todeschini Piccolomini
     │    │    │
     │    │    ├──> Jacqueline of Rohan-Gié (1520–1587), Lady of Blandy-les-Tours, Marchionness of Rothelin, Princess of Neuchâtel
     │    │    │    x (19/06/1536 in Lyon) Francis IV of Orléans-Longueville (02/03/1513-25/10/1548), Marquis of Rothelin, Duke of Longueville, Count of Neuchâtel, Prince of Châtellaillon, Viscount of Melun, Count of Tancarville and Montgommery, Baron of Varenguebec, Lieutenant of the Company of Longueville-sur-Scie, son Louis I of Orléans-Longueville (1480-01/08/1516 in Beaugency), Count then Duke of Longueville-sur-Scie, Count of Neuchâtel, Marquis of Rothelin, Prince of Châtellaillon, Count of Dunois, Tancarville and Montgommery, Baron of Varenguebec and Parthenay, Viscount of Melun, captain, Grand Chamberlain of France, Governor of Provence, and Johanna of Baden-Hochberg-Neuchâtel (c. 1485-21/09/1543 in Époisses), Marchionness of Rothelin, Countess of Neuchâtel, Lady of Joux
     │    │    │
     │    │    ├──> Francis of Rohan-Gié (1515–1559), Lord of Gié and Verger, Viscount of Fronsac, Count of Orbec
     │    │    │    x (1536) Catherine of Silly, Countess of Rochefort, daughter of Charles of Silly (c. 1477–1518), Lord of Rochefort-en-Terre, and Philippa of Commercy (c. 1490–1551), Viscountess of Louvois
     │    │    │    x Renée of Rohan-Guéméné (see above)
     │    │    │    │
     │    │    │    ├──> Eleanor of Rohan-Gié (1539–1583), Countess of Rochefort
     │    │    │    │    x (22/07/1561) Louis VI de Rohan-Guéméné (03/04/1540-04/06/1611), Prince of Guéméné, Count of Montbazon (see above)
     │    │    │    │
     │    │    │    ├──> Jacqueline of Rohan-Gié (?–1578), Lady of Gié
     │    │    │    │    x Francis of Balzac (?–1613), Lord of Entragues
     │    │    │    │
     │    │    │    └──> Françoise Diane of Rohan-Gié (?–1585), Lady of Gillebourg
     │    │    │         x (1564) Francis of Maillé of La Tour-Landry (?–1598), Count of Châteauroux
     │    │    │
     │    │    └──> Claude de Rohan-Gié, Countess of Thoury
     │    │         x (1537) Claude of Beauvilliers (?–1540)
     │    │         x Julian of Clermont-Tonnerre, son of Bernardin of Clermont (1440–1522), Viscount of Tallard, Lord of Saint-André-en-Royans, and Anne of Husson (1475–1540), Countess of Tonnerre
     │    │
     │    ├──> Francis II of Rohan-Gié (1480–13/10/1536 in Paris), Archbishop of Lyon, Bishop of Angers
     │    │
     │    x (1503) Margaret of Armagnac (?–1503), Countess of Guise, daughter of James of Armagnac-Nemours
     │
     └──> Helena of Rohan-Guéméné (?–1507)
          x Peter du Pont (?-

=== Rohan-Gué-de-l'Isle branch ===
Arms of the Rohan-Gué-de-l'Isle branch

The Rohan-Gué-de-l'Isle branch is a junior branch said to be descended (c. 1270) from Alan VI (1232–1304), Viscount of Rohan, and his second wife Thomasse of La Roche-Bernard (c. 1245 – after 1304). It is named after the estate of Saint-Étienne-du-Gué-de-l'Isle (Côtes-d'Armor).

The branch was extinct around 1530.

Rohan-Gué-de-l'Isle branch

...
│
└──> Alan VI (1232–1304), Viscount of Rohan
     x Isabeau d'Avaugour (?–1266)
     x (1266) Thomasse of La Roche-Bernard[98] (c. 1245 – c. 1304)
     │
     └──> Odo of Rohan (Odo of Rohan-Gué-de-l'Isle) (? – after 1346), Lord of Gué-de-l'Isle
          x Aliette de Coëtlogon, Lady Gué-de-l'Isle
          │
          ├──> Richarde de Rohan-Gué-de-l'Isle
          │    x Éon, Lord of Treal and Le Gouray
          │
          └──> Oliver I of Rohan-Gué-de-l'Isle (?–1410)
               x Alaine of Botdevenu
               x Havisette of La Châtaigneraie
               │
               ├──> Joan of Rohan-Gué-de-l'Isle
               │    x Jean du Cambout (?–1428)
               │
               ├──> Isabella of Rohan-Gué-de-l'Isle (?–1434)
               │    x Alan of Beaumont
               │
               ├──> Catherine of Rohan-Gué-de-l'Isle
               │    x Alan of Le Thou
               │
               └──> Oliver II of Rohan-Gué-de-l'Isle (?–1463)
                    x Marie de Rostrenen (?–1471)
                    │
                    ├──> Oliver III of Rohan-Gué-de-l'Isle
                    │
                    ├──> Catherine of Rohan-Gué-de-l'Isle
                    │    x Georges Chesnel
                    │
                    ├──> Yolande of Rohan-Gué-de-l'Isle
                    │    x (1463) Guillaume Le Sénéchal (?–1505)
                    │
                    ├──> Joan of Rohan-Gué-de-l'Isle
                    │    x John of Ramé
                    │
                    ├──> Joan of Rohan-Gué-de-l'Isle
                    │    x John, Lord of La Touche-Limouzinière
                    │
                    ├──> Mary of Rohan-Gué-de-l'Isle
                    │    x (1450) Caro Lord of Bodegat
                    │
                    └──> John I of Rohan-Gué-de-l'Isle (?–1493)
                         x (1453) Gilette of Rochefort
                         │
                         ├──> Francis of Rohan-Gué-de-l'Isle
                         │    x Jacquette of Peillac
                         │    │
                         │    ├──> Vincente of Rohan-Gué-de-l'Isle, Lady of Peillac
                         │    │    x Maurice of Plusquellec
                         │    │
                         │    ├──> Cyprienne of Rohan-Gué-de-l'Isle
                         │    │    x Francis of La Feillée (?–1538), Viscount of Pléhédel
                         │    │
                         │    x Adelise de Juch
                         │
                         └──> John II of Rohan-Gué-de-l'Isle (?–1517)
                              x (1500) Guillemette Malor
                              │
                              ├──> Gillette of Rohan-Gué-de-l'Isle (1500–1530)
                              │    x (1521) Marc of Carne (?–1553)
                              │
                              ├──> Ponceau de Rohan-Gué-de-l'Isle
                              │    x (1514) Madeleine Boissot
                              │
                              ├──> Tristan of Rohan-Gué-de-l'Isle (Tristan de Rohan-Polduc)
                              │    x Alix de Brebant
                              │    │
                              │    └──>Rohan-Polduc branch
                              │
                              ├──> Joan of Rohan-Gué-de-l'Isle
                              │    x (1526) Pierre Ermar
                              │
                              x Françoise Laurens

=== Rohan-Polduc branch ===
Armes d'Emmanuel de Rohan-Polduc

Also called Rohan-Pouldu. This little-known branch is a junior branch of the Rohan-Gué-de-l'Isle branch and appeared around 1500. It was named after the estate of Pouldu near Pontivy (nowadays Saint-Jean-Brévelay). Its best-known member is Emmanuel de Rohan-Polduc, Magister Magnus of the Knights Hospitaller from 1775 to 1797.

The branch became extinct in 1800.

- John II of Rohan-Gué-de-l'Isle (?–1517), married (1500) Guillemette Malor'
  - Tristan de Rohan-Gué-de-l'Isle (Tristan de Rohan-Polduc), married Alix de Brebant
    - Louis de Rohan-Polduc (?–1584), married (1577) Michelle de L'Hospital
      - Samsonne de Rohan-Polduc, married François Josset
      - Jérôme de Rohan-Polduc, married (1610) Julienne Le Métayer
        - Anne de Rohan-Polduc, married (1638) Jean de Coëtlagat
        - Isaac de Rohan-Polduc, married (1638) Aliénor de Kerpoisson
          - Anne de Rohan-Polduc, married François de Broel
          - Jean de Rohan-Polduc (?–1726), married (1690) Marie de Trello
          - Jean-Baptiste I de Rohan-Polduc (?–1711), married (1690) Pélagie Martin, Mady of Châteaulin
            - Jean-Baptiste II de Rohan-Polduc (1675–1755), married (1723) Marie Louise de Velthoven
              - Jean-Baptiste de Rohan-Polduc (1724–1782))
              - Marie Pélagie de Rohan-Polduc (1724–1753), married (1737) François de Groesquer, Count of Groesquer
              - Emmanuel Marie-des-Neiges de Rohan-Polduc (1725–1797), ambassador, général des galères, baillif of Justice, general of the land and naval forces, Knight Hospitaller, Magister Magnus of the Knights Hospitaller
              - Jean Léonard de Rohan-Polduc (?–1748)

=== Rohan-Montauban branch ===
Arms of the Rohan-Montauban family

This branch is said to be descended from Josselin of Rohan, son of Alan III, Viscount of Rohan and his second wife Françoise de Corbey around 1185, but its filiation has not been proven. It became extinct around 1494. Named after the estate of Montauban-de-Bretagne near Rennes. Several Seneschals and Marshals of Brittany belonged to this branch.

This branch became extinct in the Rohan-Guéméné branch in 1494.

== House of Rohan-Chabot ==
The House of Rohan-Chabot is the eldest branch of the Chabot family, from Poitou. It is descended from the House of Rohan in female line through the marriage of Marguerite de Rohan (1617–1684) (only daughter and heiress of Henry II, Duke of Rohan) with Henri Chabot (1616–1655), from the eldest branch of the Chabot de Jarnac family, in 1645. Henri Chabot was created Duke of Rohan in 1648 by Louis XIV, and his descendants bear the name Rohan-Chabot.

== Portraits ==
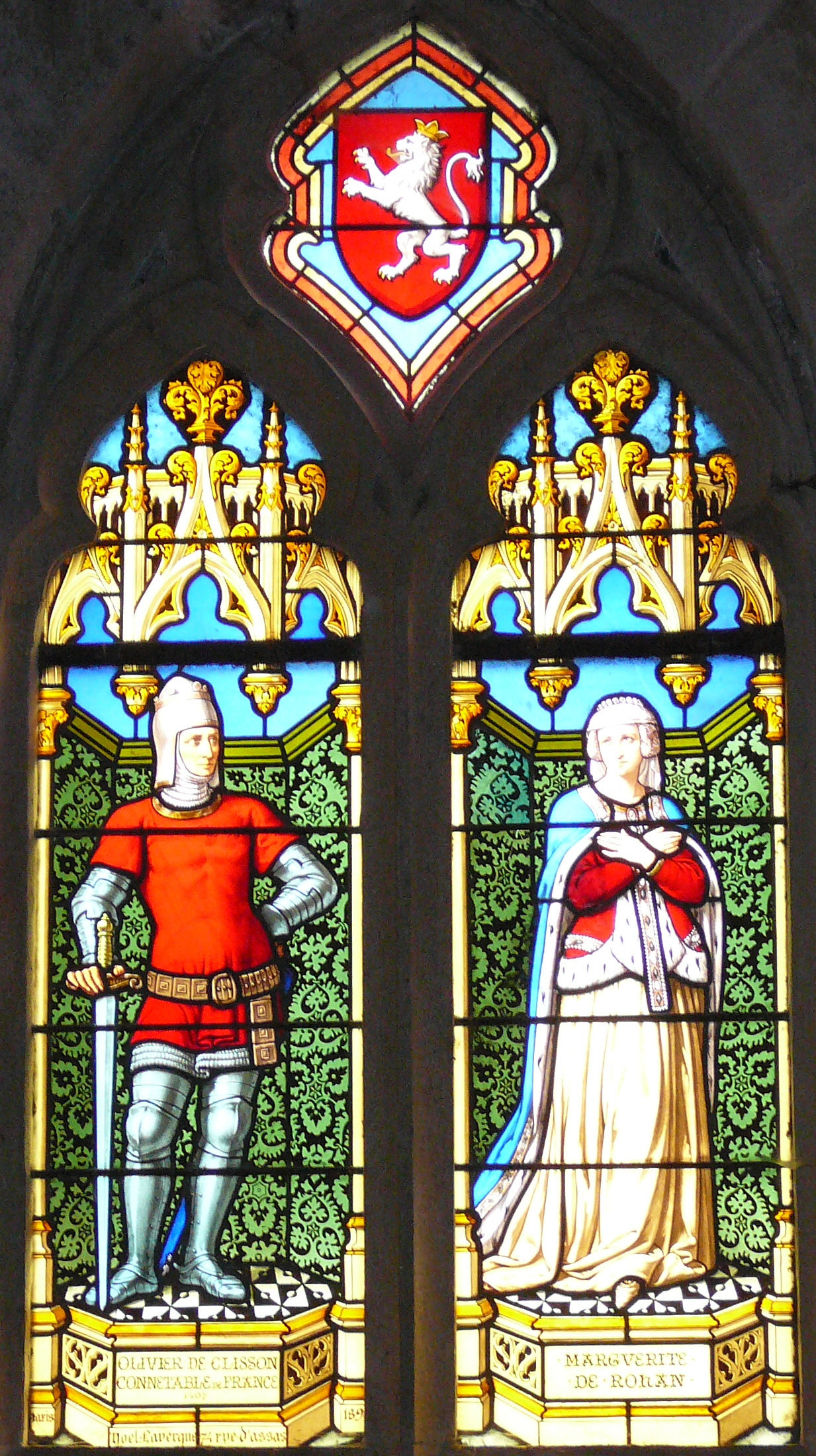
Marguerite de Rohan (v. 1330–1406) and her husband the Constable of Clisson

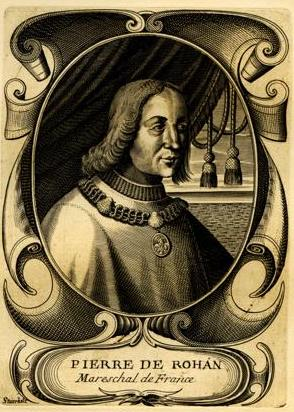
Pierre de Rohan-Guéméné, also known as Marshal of Gié (1451–1513), Marshal of France

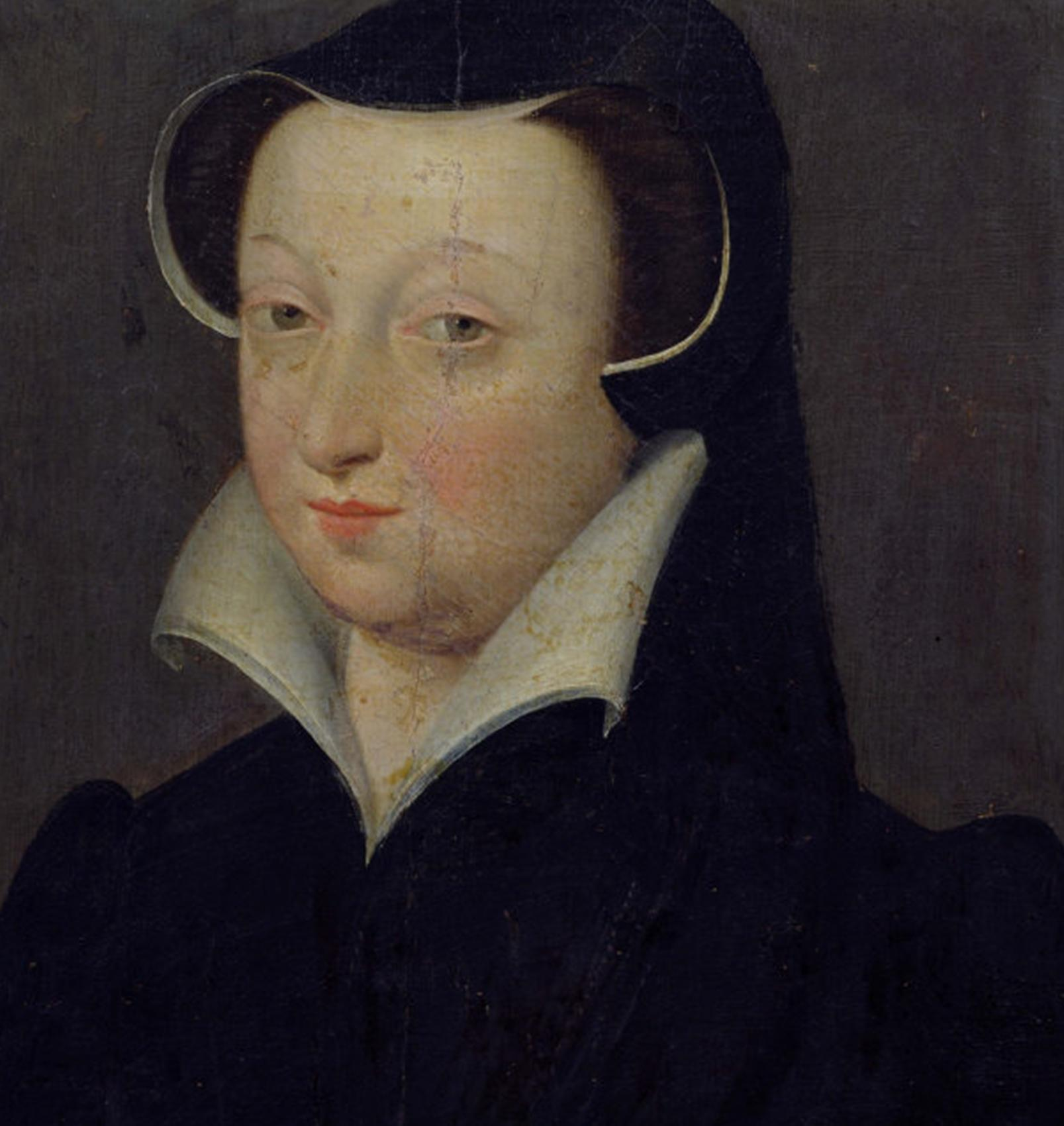
Jacqueline de Rohan-Gié (1520–1587), Lady of Blandy-les-Tours, Marchionness of Rothelin, Princess of Neuchâtel

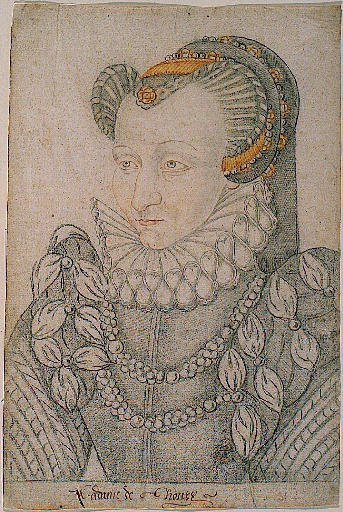
Claude de Rohan-Gié, Countess of Thoury

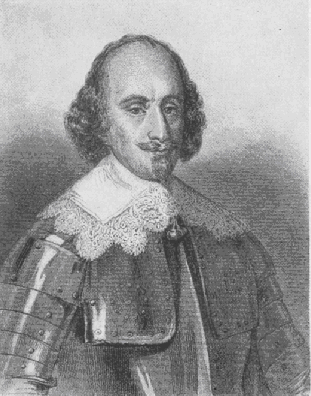
Henri II de Rohan (1579–1638) viscount then Duke of Rohan, Prince of Léon, Generalissimo of the Protestant armies, Ambassador of France, Colonel-général des Suisses et des Grisons

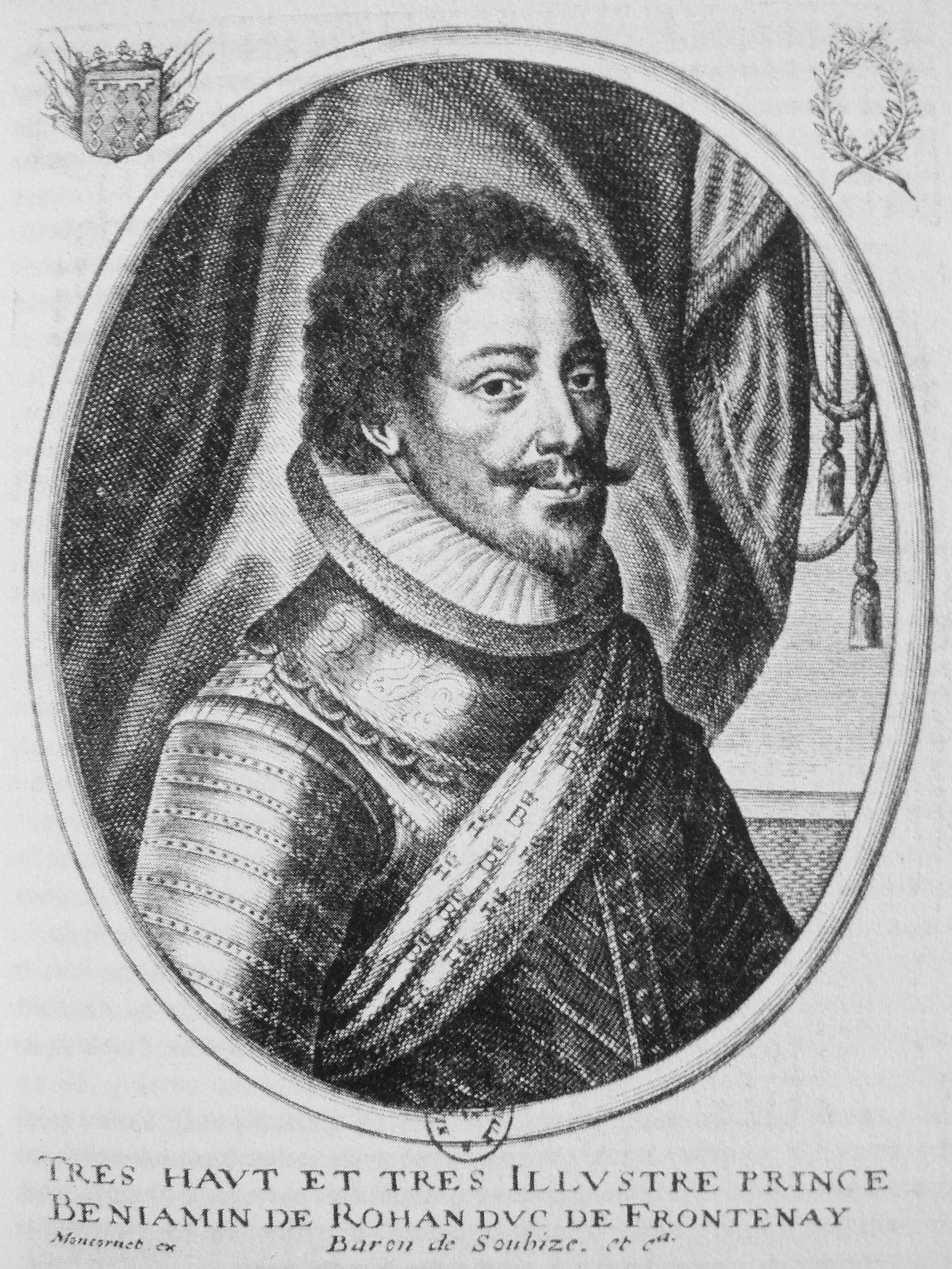
Benjamin de Rohan, also known as "the Duke of Soubise" (1583–1642) Duke of Frontenay

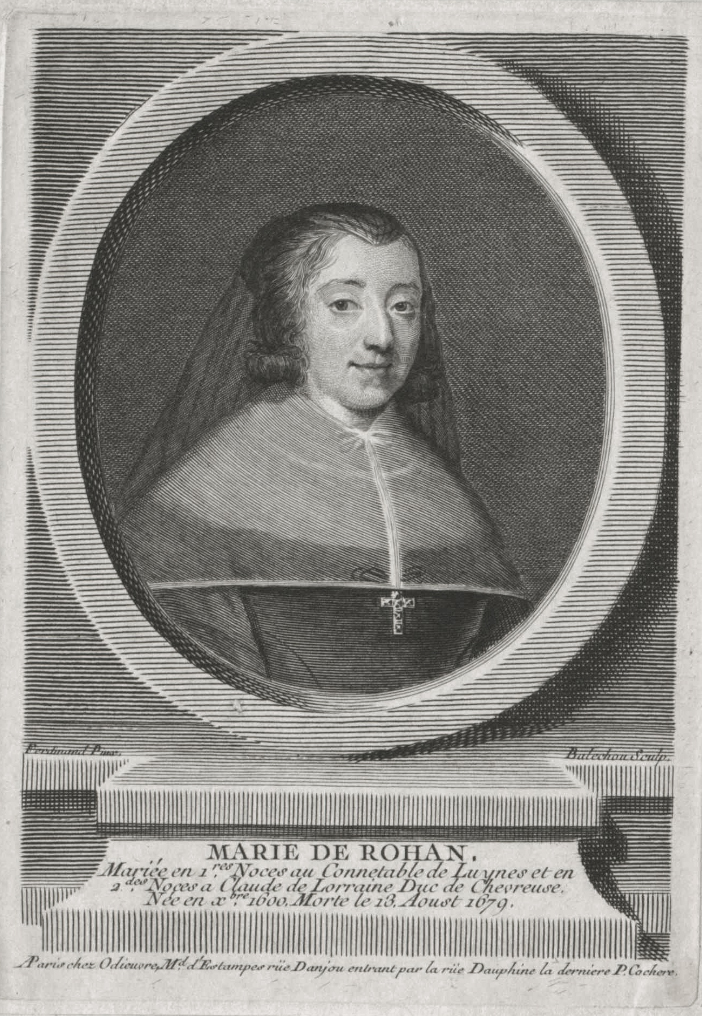
Marie Aimée de Rohan-Guéméné (1600–1679), Duchess of Luynes and Chevreuse

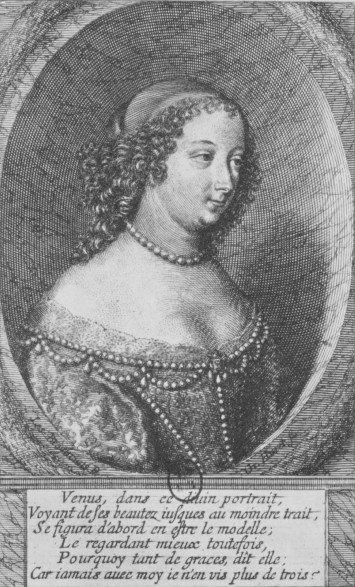
Marguerite de Rohan (1617–1684), Princess of Léon

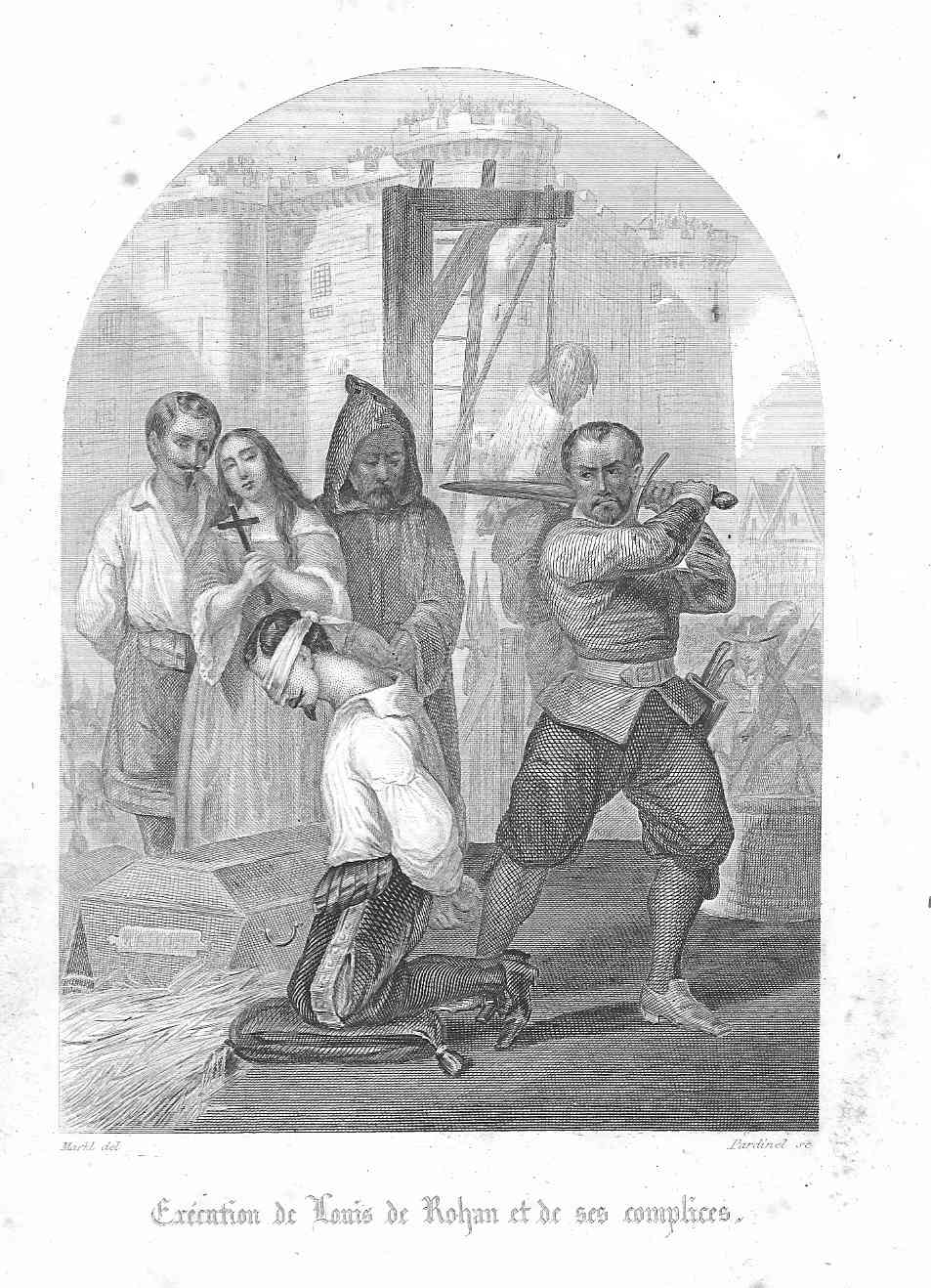
Louis de Rohan-Guéméné, also known as "the Knight of Rohan" (1635–1674), Grand Huntsman of France, Louis XIV's Colonel of the Guards

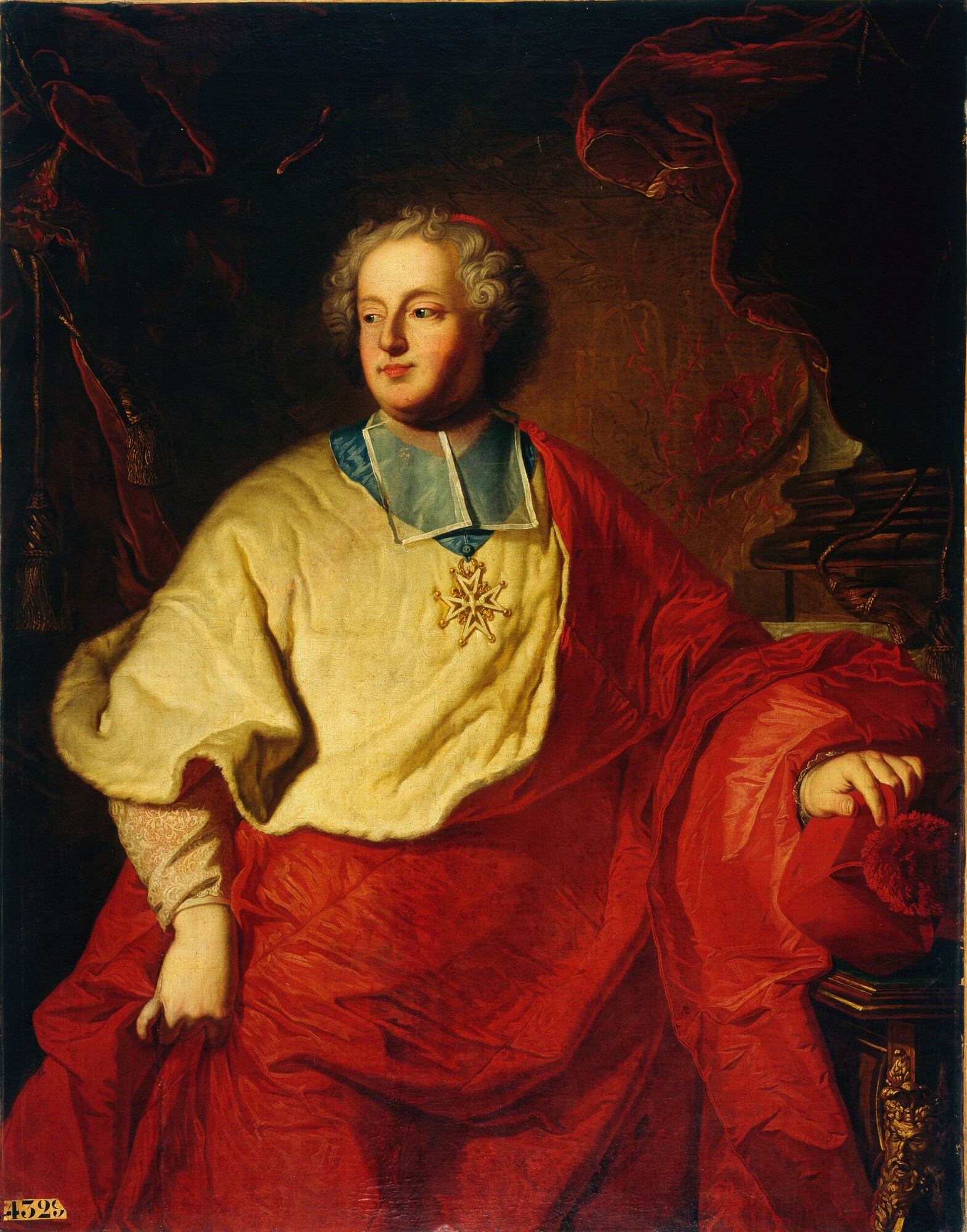
Armand Gaston Maximilien de Rohan-Soubise (1674–1749) Prince of Rohan, Prince of Soubise, Bishop of Strasbourg, Cardinal, member of the Académie Française, Grand Almoner of France

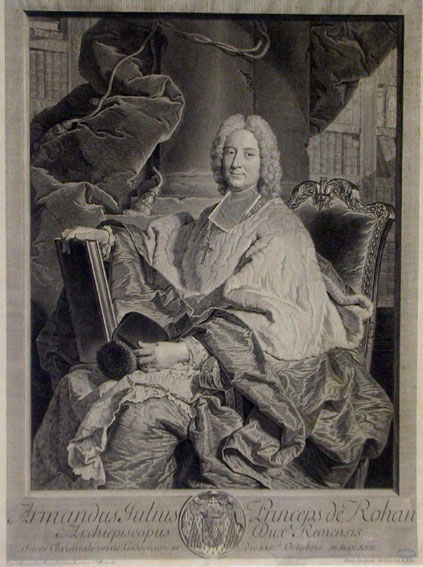
Armand Jules de Rohan-Guéméné (1695–1762) Duke-Archbishop of Reims and Peer of France

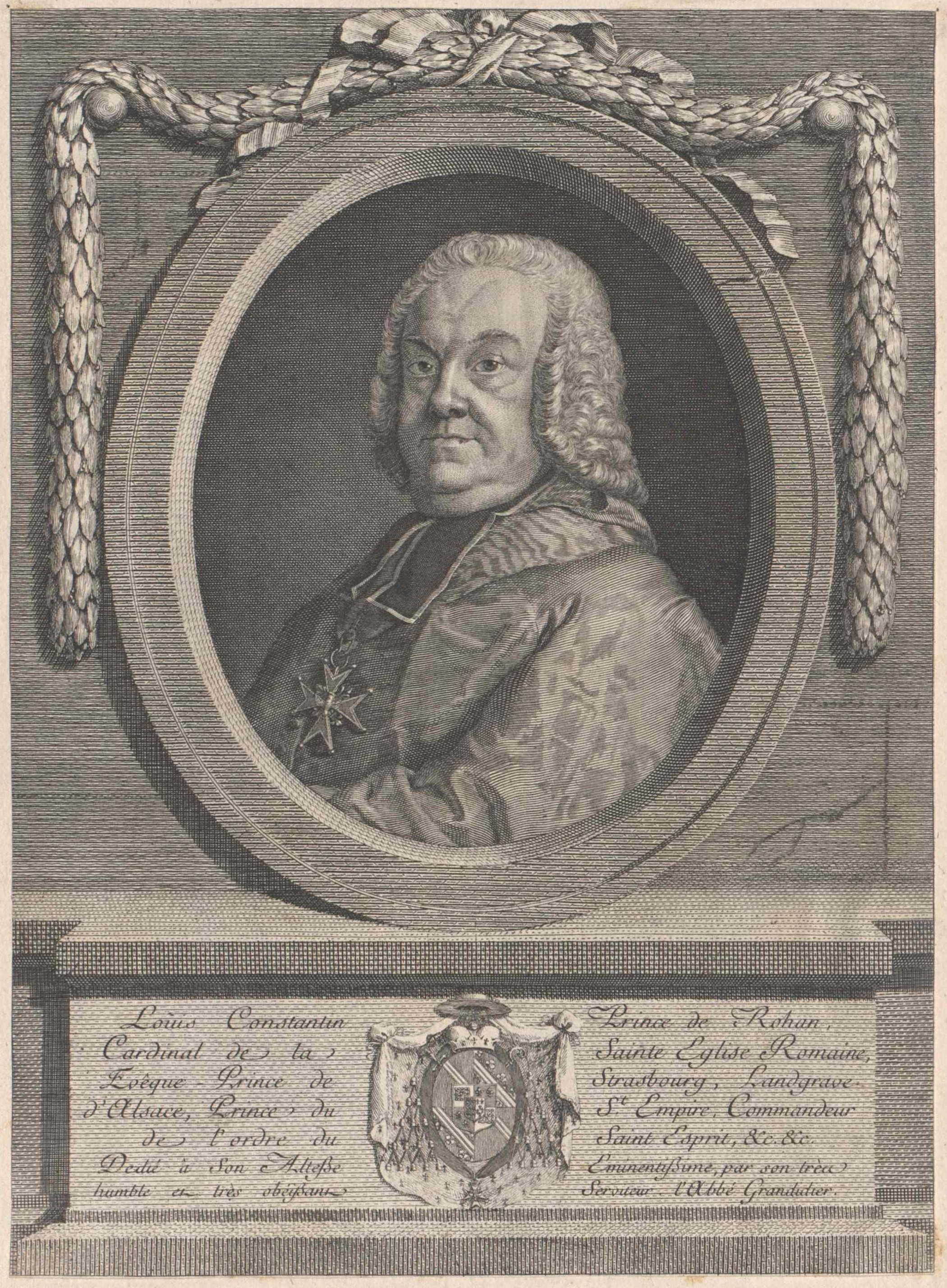
Louis César Constantin de Rohan-Guéméné, also known as "the Cardinal de Rohan" (1697–1779), Bishop of Strasbourg, Cardinal

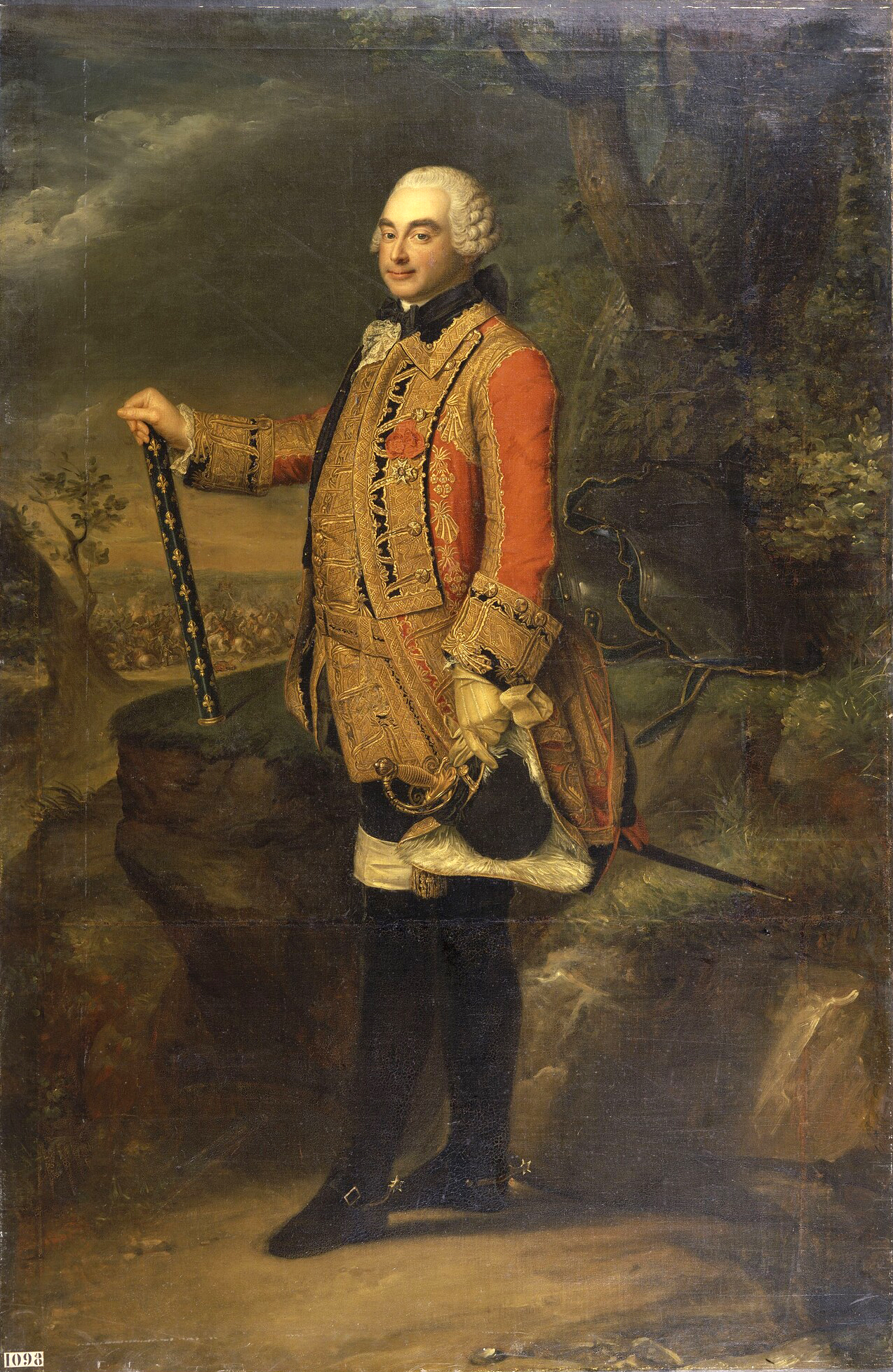
Charles de Rohan-Soubise, also known as "the Marshal of Soubise" (1715–1787) Prince of Soubise, Duke of Rohan-Rohan, minister of Kings Louis XV and Louis XVI, Marshal of France

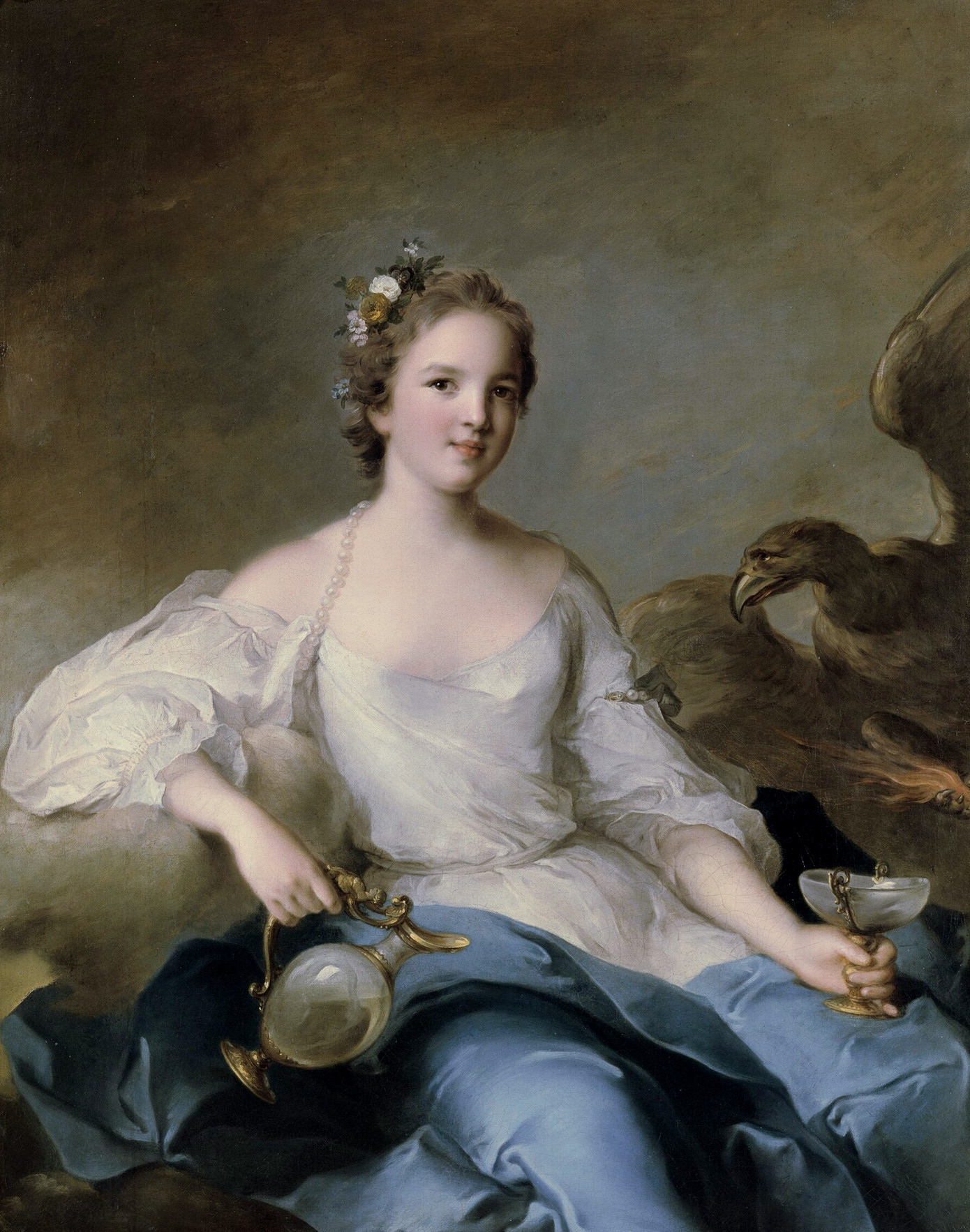
Charlotte Louise de Rohan-Guéméné, Princess of Masseran, also known as "Mademoiselle de Rohan" (1722–1786)

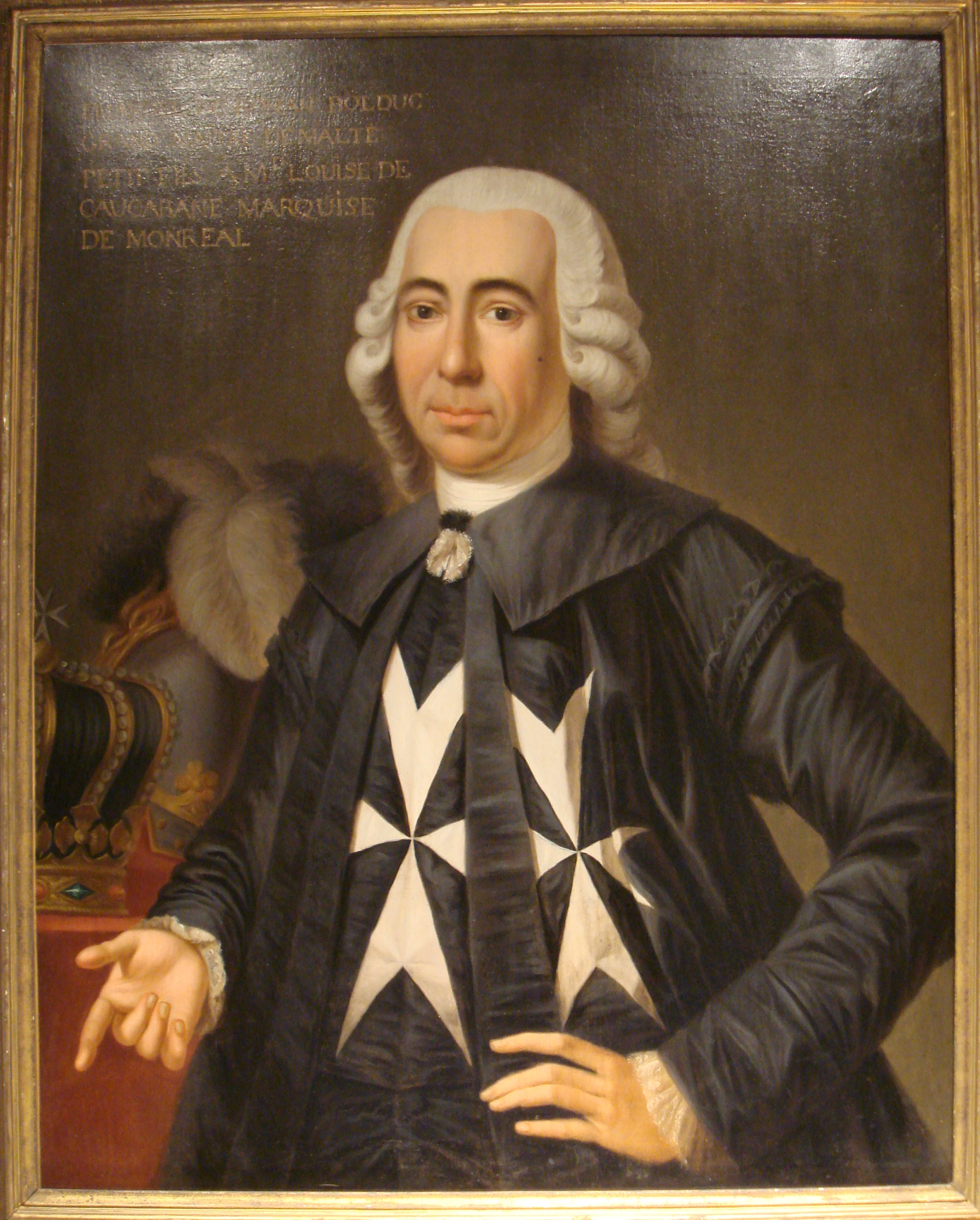
Emmanuel de Rohan-Polduc (1725–1797), ambassador, Général des galères, Knight Hospitaller, Magister Magnus of the Knights Hospitaller

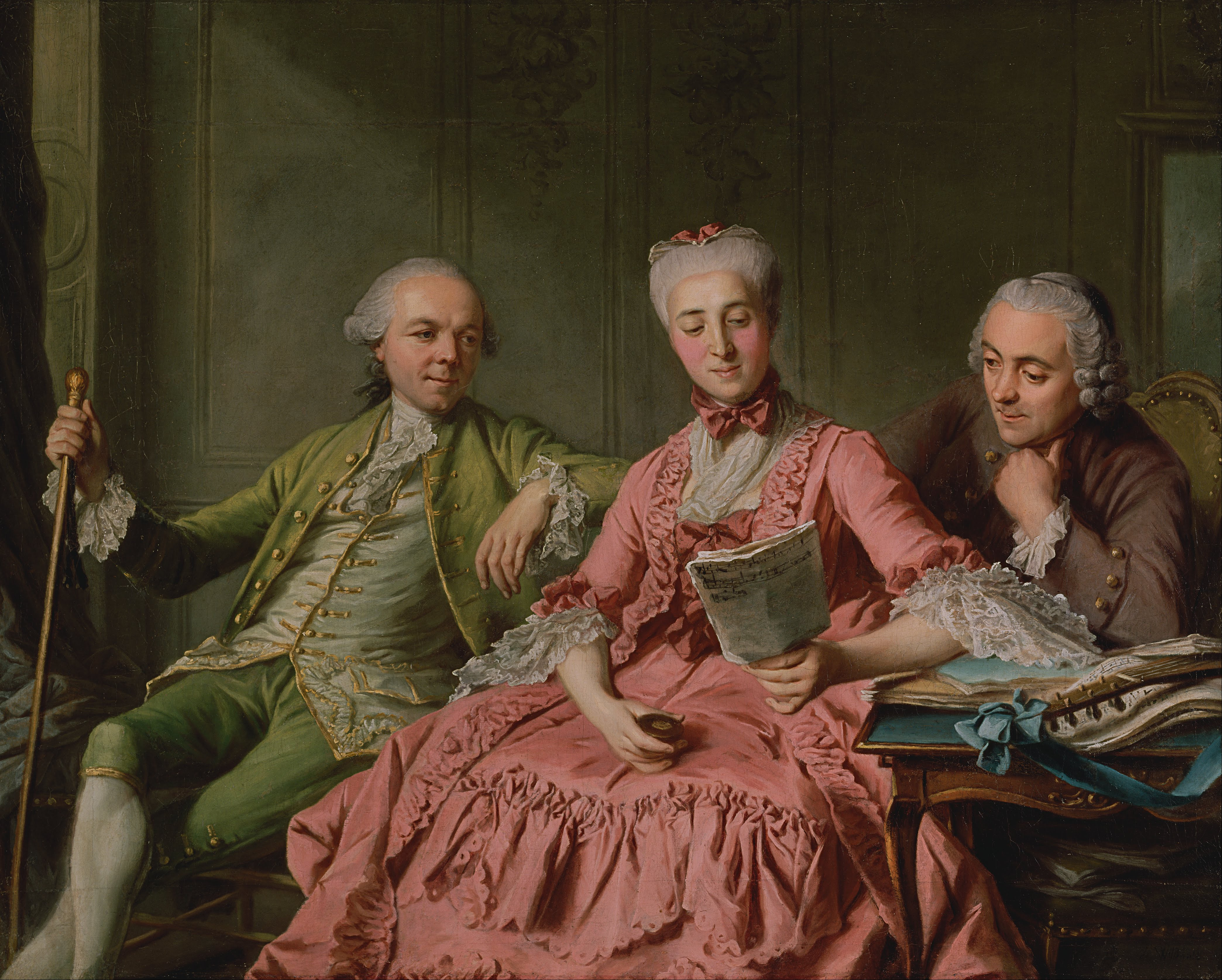
Louise de Rohan-Rochefort (1734–1815)

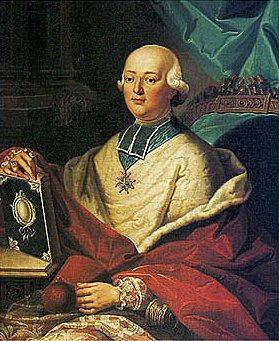
Louis René Édouard de Rohan-Guéméné (1734–1803), Prince of Rohan, Cardinal, Archbishop of Strasbourg, member of the Académie française, Grand Almoner of the King and Head of the Sorbonne

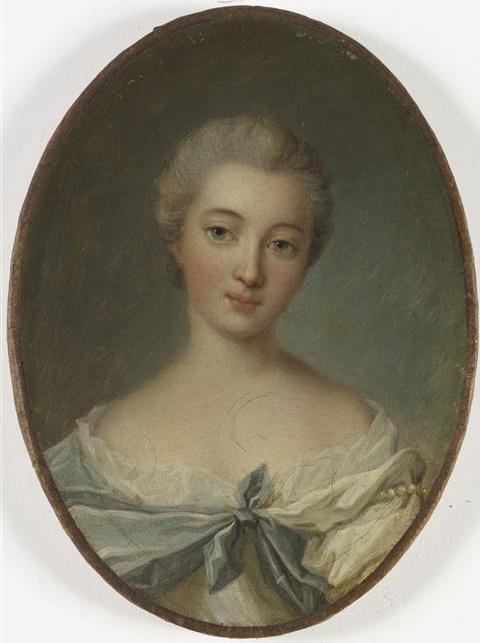
Charlotte de Rohan-Soubise (1737–1760), Princess of Condé

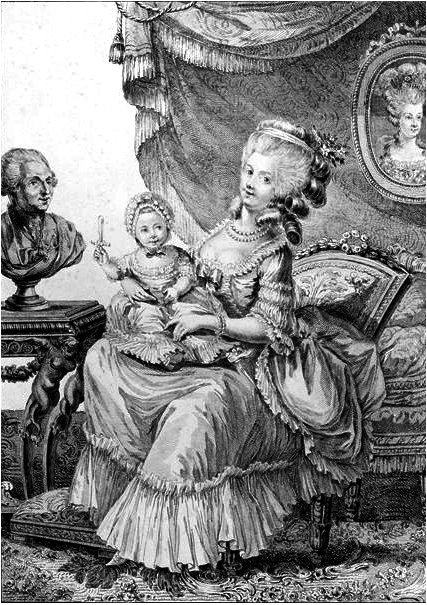
Victoire Armande Josèphe de Rohan-Soubise also known as "Madame de Guéméné" (1743–1807), Princess of Maubuisson

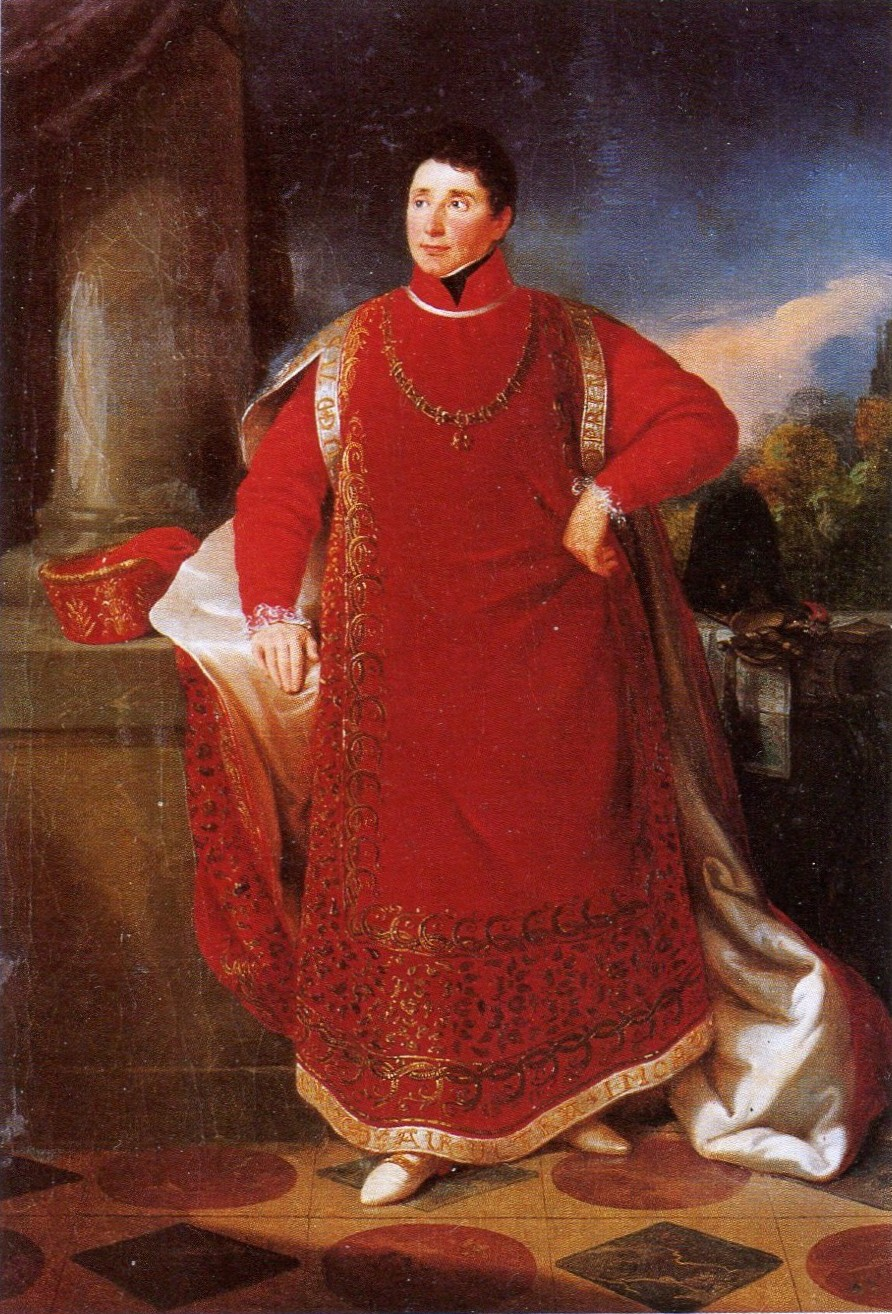
Charles Alain Gabriel de Rohan-Guéméné (1764–1836), Duke of Montbazon, Prince of Guéméné, Duke of Bouillon

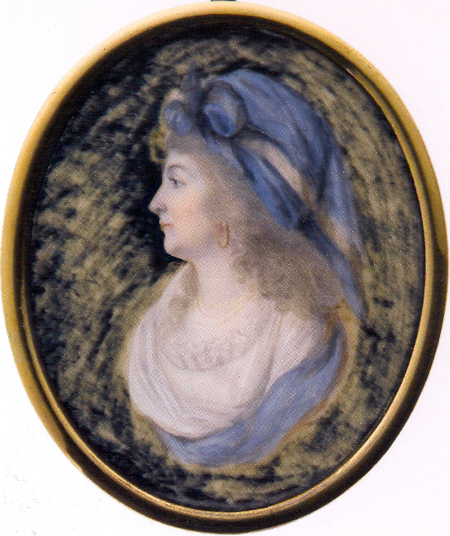
Charlotte de Rohan-Rochefort (1767–1841), wife the Duc d'Enghien

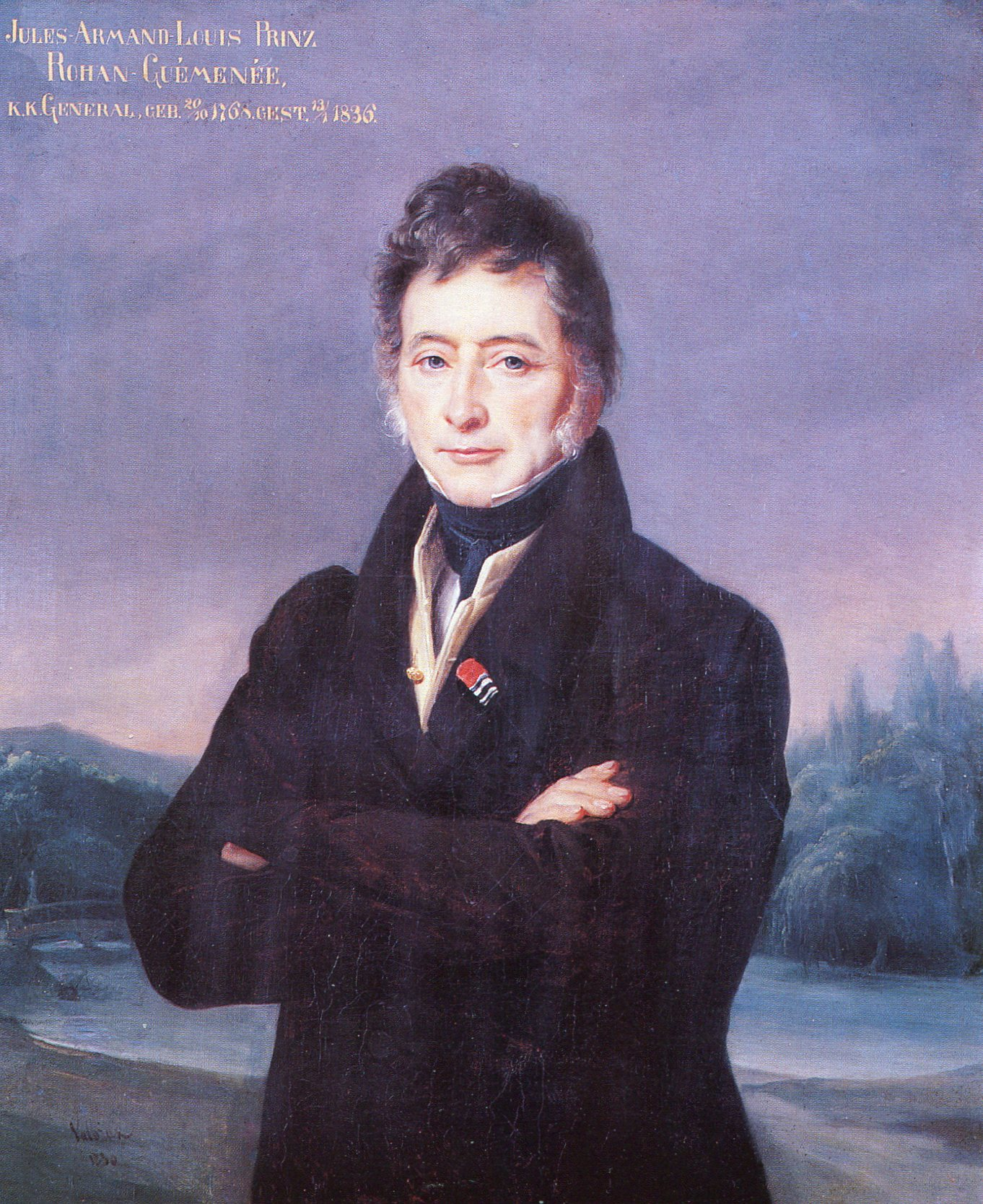
Jules Armand Louis de Rohan-Guéméné (1768–1836)

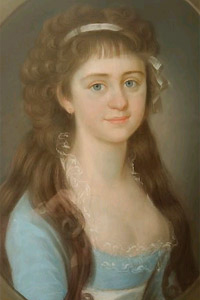
Marie Victoire de Rohan (1779–1836)

== Notable members ==
Several members of the Rohan-Guéméné family migrated to Sychrov Castle in northern Bohemia, then part of the Austrian Empire, and were naturalized. After this branch became extinct in 1846, the princes of Rohan-Rochefort younger branch inherited the properties in Bohemia but were deprived of them in 1945, following the Beneš decrees. They also inherited the titles Serene Highness, Prince of Rohan, Prince of Guéméné, Prince of Rochefort and Prince of the Holy-Roman-Empire (in Austria until 1919), Duke of Rohan-Rohan, Duke of Montbazon with the Peerage of France attached to it, and Duke of Bouillon.

There were three Grand Almoners of France, eight Knights of the Order of the Holy Spirit, two Marshals of France, and three members of the Académie Française in the family.

=== Clergy ===
- Geoffrey II of Rohan (? – c. 1377), Bishop of Vannes, then Saint-Brieuc.
- Josselin de Rohan (? – Saint-Malo, 21 March 1388), Bishop of Saint-Malo.
- Francis II of Rohan-Gié (1480 – Paris, 13 October 1536), [Bishop of Angers (1501–1532) and Archbishop of Lyon (1532–1536).
- Claude of Rohan (1480 – 8 July 1540), Bishop of Quimper and Cornouaille.
- Armand-Gaston-Maximilien de Rohan-Soubise (Paris, 26 June 1674 – Paris, 19 July 1749), who may have actually been an illegitimate son of Louis XIV, Prince of Rohan, Bishop of Strasbourg in 1704, he became cardinal in 1712, then Grand Almoner in 1713. He was elected at the Académie Française in 1704.
- Armand-Jules de Rohan-Guéméné (Paris, 10 February 1695 – Saverne, 28 August 1762), abbot of Gard and Gorze, Duke-Archbishop of Reims, who anointed Louis XV, peer of France
- Louis-César Constantin de Rohan-Guéméné, also known as "the Cardinal of Rohan" (Paris, 24 March 1697 – Paris, 11 March 1779), Bishop of Strasbourg in 1756, appointed cardinal in 1761.
- François-Armand de Rohan-Soubise (Paris, 1 December 1717 – Saverne, 28 June 1756), Coadjutor Bishop to his uncle Armand-Gaston. He took the name Soubise to be distinguishable from him; he became a cardinal himself in 1747 and Bishop of Strasbourg in 1749. He was Grand Almoner and Chancellor of the University of Paris. He was elected at the Académie Française in 1741.
- Louis-René-Édouard de Rohan-Guéméné (Paris, 25 September 1734 – Ettenheim, 17 February 1803), Prince of Rohan, cardinal-Archbishop of Strasbourg, Grand Almoner of the King and Head of the Sorbonne. He was involved in the Affair of the Diamond Necklace and was sent to the Bastille. He went into exile in 1791 to Ettenheim, in the German part of his diocese, and married his niece Charlotte de Rohan-Rochefort to the Duc d'Enghien. He died in February 1803. He was elected at the Académie Française in 1761.
- Ferdinand de Rohan-Guéméné (Paris, 7 November 1738 – Paris, 31 October 1813), Prince of Rohan-Guéméné, Archbishop of Bordeaux in 1769, Prince-Archbishop of Cambrai in 1781 and of Liège in 1790. He was First Almoner to Empress Joséphine in the early 19th century.

=== Soldiers ===
- Pierre de Rohan-Guéméné, also known as Pierre I de Rohan-Gié or the "Marshal of Gié" (Saint-Quentin-les-Anges, 1451 – Paris, 22 April 1513), Lord of Gié, viscount of Fronsac, Marshal of France. He was a diplomat and councillor of the kings Louis XI, Charles VIII and Louis XII. He was charged with treason in 1504. In 1506, Pierre de Rohan-Gié was suspended for five years and exiled from the Court. He was later absolved of the crime of lèse-majesté.
- Henri II de Rohan (Blain, 25 August 1579 – Geneva, 28 February 1638), peer of France, viscount, then Duke of Rohan, Prince of Léon, Lord of Blain, Generalissimo of the Protestant armies, Ambassador of France, Colonel Général des Suisses et des Grisons. A Protestant, he fought in the south of France against the royal troops between 1615 and 1629. He was pardoned by Louis XIII, took the Valtellina from the Spanish and was mortally wounded while fighting for the Duke of Saxe-Weimar on 13 April 1638 at the battle of Koenigsfeld. He was buried in Geneva cathedral.
- Charles de Rohan-Soubise, also known as the Marshal de Soubise (Versailles, 16 July 1715 – Paris, 1 July 1787), Prince of Soubise and Épinoy, Duke of Rohan-Rohan, Ventadour and GoëloCount of Saint-Pol, Lord of Roberval and Clisson, minister of the kings Louis XV and Louis XVI, Marshal of France. Louis XV's general and friend, he took part to the Seven Years' War.
- Hercule Mériadec de Rohan (13 November 1688 – 21 December 1757), Duke of Montbazon, Prince of Guéméné, standard-bearer of the Gendarmes de la Garde.
- Jules Hercule Mériadec de Rohan (25 March 1726 – 10 December 1788), Duke of Montbazon, Prince of Guéméné, chief-lieutenant of the King's armies.
- Henri-Louis de Rohan-Guéméné (30 August 1745-24 April 1809), Prince of Rohan-Guéméné and Duke of Montbazon, lieutenant-captain of the Gendarmes de la Garde, Brigadier of the King's armies, Grand Chamberlain of France. The eldest of this branch, he went bankrupt and ruined many people in 1782, but his debts were partially paid off by the Cardinal of Strasbourg Louis-René-Édouard de Rohan-Guéméné who was a victim in the Affair of the Diamond Necklace in 1785.

=== Politicians ===
- John II of Rohan (16 November 1452 – Blain, 1 April 1516), Viscount of Rohan and Léon, Count of Porhoët, Lord of Blain, La Garnache and Beauvoir-sur-Mer, councillor and chamberlain of King Charles VIII, chief-lieutenant of Brittany in 1494 with Francis of Avaugour under Charles VIII.
- Marie-Aimée de Rohan-Guéméné (Coupvray, December 1600 – 12 August 1679), first Duchess of Luynes through her marriage with Charles d'Albert (1578–1621), Duke of Luynes, Grand Constable of France, Peer of France, then Duchess of Chevreuse (the title she is best known for) through her marriage with Claude de Lorraine, also known as Claude de Guise (1578–1657), Duke of Chevreuse; she became known as Princess of Chevreuse during her widowhood.
- Charles III of Rohan (30 September 1655 – 10 October 1727), Duke of Montbazon, Prince of Guéméné, Peer of France.
- Emmanuel-Marie-des-Neiges de Rohan-Polduc (18 April 1725 – La Valette, 14 July 1797), last member of the Rohan-Polduc branch (or Pouldu branch), he was the last but one Magister Magnus of the Knights Hospitaller from 1775 to 1797, author of the "Maltese Code" also called "Code de Rohan".
- Alain Benjamin Arthur de Rohan-Rochefort (8 January 1853 – 23 February 1914), Duke of Montbazon, Duke of Bouillon, Prince of Guéméné, member of the Herrenhaus, deputy at the Parliament of Bohemia.
- Marie-Berthe Françoise Félicie Jeanne de Rohan-Rochefort (21 May 1868 – 19 January 1945), wife of Charles de Bourbon (1848–1909), Duke of Madrid, pretender to the throne of France and eldest of the House of Bourbon.
- Albert-Marie de Rohan-Rochefort, also known as Albert Rohan (Melk, 9 May 1936 – 4 June 2019), Prince of Guéméné, Austrian diplomat.

=== Others ===
- Louis de Rohan-Guéméné, also known as the Knight of Rohan (1635 – Paris, 27 November 1674), Grand Huntsman of France, Colonel of the Guards of Louis XIV, with whom he had been brought up. Executed for a crime lèse-majesté, having taken part in the Conspiracy of Latréaumont.
- Hercule Mériadec de Rohan (1669–1749)
- Charles, Prince of Soubise
- Victoire de Rohan
- Marie de Rohan (1600–1679), French courtier and political activist, depicted in Maria di Rohan
- Emmanuel de Rohan-Polduc (1725–1797), 70th Prince an Grand Master of the Order of St. John
- Charles Edward Stuart, Count Roehenstart (c. 1784–1854), passive Jacobite claimant to the British throne
- Berthe de Rohan (1868–1945), titular Queen Consort of Spain, France and Navarre
- Marie-Liesse de Rohan-Chabot, contracted marriage (civil 19 June 1999, religious 10 July 1999) with Prince Eudes of Orléans, Duke of Angoulême, youngest son of Henri, Count of Paris, Duke of France, the late Orleanist claimant to the throne of France.

== Arms ==
Former arms

Modern arms

The mascles on the arms of the House of Rohan refer to crystal twinnings, which are large crystals of chiastolite (andalusite) that develop in Ordovician schists. They are almost square-sectioned prisms. These stones, which were for centuries called "mascles", abound in the Salles de Rohan, so much that the Viscounts of Rohan, stricken by their beauty and the likeness with the lozenge, put seven mascles or on their coat of arms; their descendants added two more in the middle of the 16th century.

=== Former arms ===
Used by Geoffrey of Rohan between 1216 and 1222: gules, seven mascles or, 3, 3, 1.

=== Modern arms ===
Used by Henry I of Rohan between 1552 and 1575. The change from the old arms to the modern ones can be explained by the change of the shape of shields from the 14th century: the base is now flat, not pointed, and the empty space is filled by two new mascles.

=== Motto ===
A plus: battle cry which may mean "without more", that is to say, without superior, reminding the Rohans' claim to be the second most important Breton noble family after the Ducal family, or "even more", which would be an invitation to always surpass themselves is Alan IX's personal motto, often attributed to the whole family. It is symbolized by the letter A topped with a Ducal crown accompanying the mascles on the coat of arms.

Another, apocryphal motto, modelled on that of the House of Coucy, is often attributed to the Rohans: Duc je ne daigne, Roi je ne puis, Prince de Bretaigne, de Rohan je suis (Duke I will not, King I cannot, Prince of Brittany, of Rohan I am) or more often: Roi ne puis, duc ne daigne, Rohan suis (King I cannot, Duke I will not, Rohan I am). Roland Barthes will use this model in a joke: Then all writers will say: "Insane I cannot, Sane I will not, neurotic I am.".

Another motto: Rather dead than soiled (Latin: Potius mori quam foedari) which is the motto of the old Dukes of Brittany, the Rohans having been their heirs presumptive since 1532 and the treaty of perpetual Union between Brittany and France.

== Titles ==
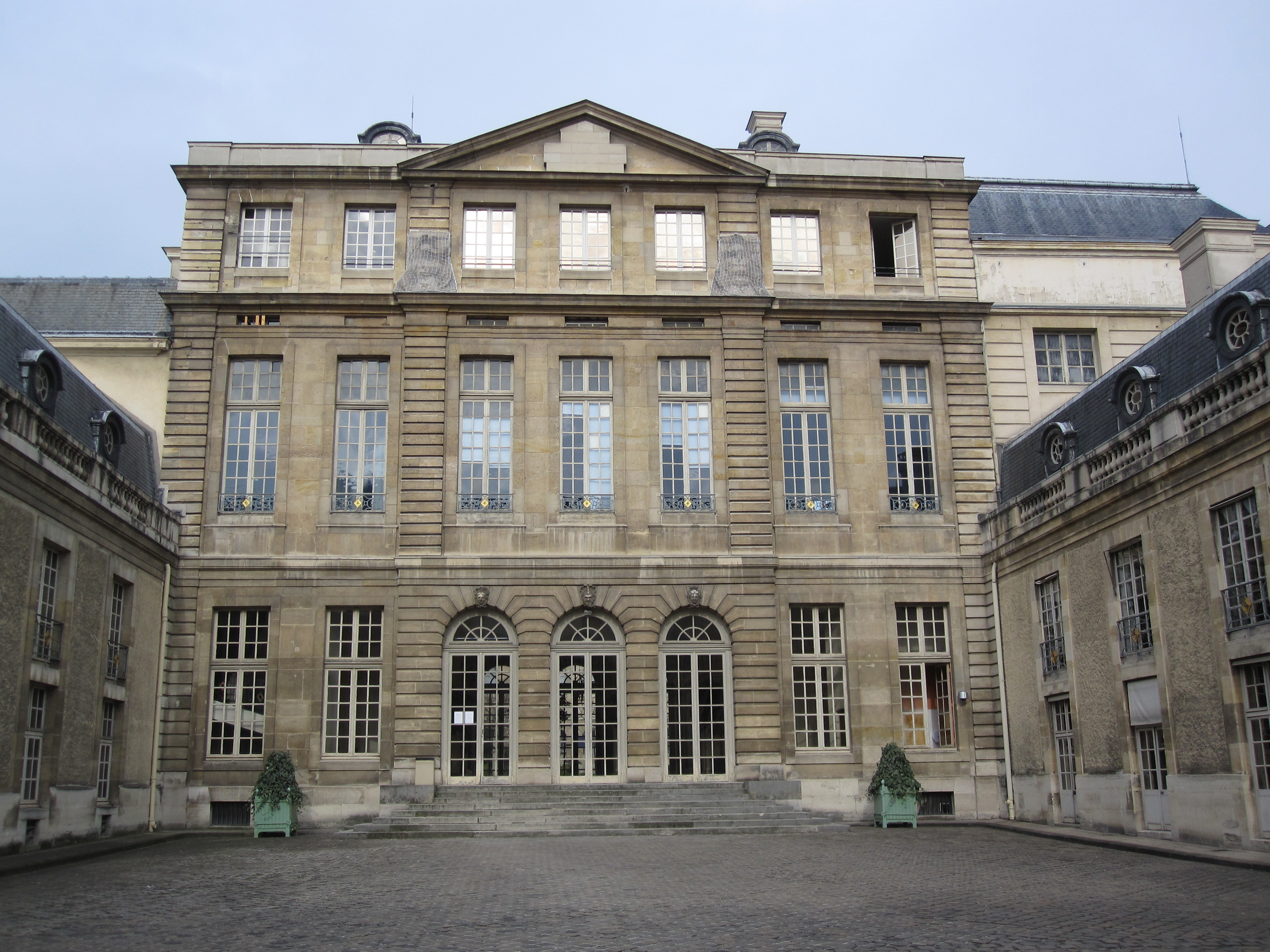
Hôtel de Rohan (rue Vieille-du-Temple, Paris)

The members of the Rohan family were first styled viscount of Porhoët, the viscount of Rohan and were granted the following titles:

- Comte de Montbazon (1566)
- Prince de Guéménée (1570)
- Duchesse de Loudun (1579) title held in her lifetime by Françoise de Rohan, daughter of René I of Rohan
- Duc-pair de Montbazon (1588 et 1594)
- Duc de Rohan (1603)
- Comte de Montauban (1611)
- Duc-pair de Frontenay (1626, not recorded)
- Prince de Soubise (erected in 1667 but not recorded)
- Duc de Rohan-Rohan (1714, extinct 1787)
- Comte de l'Empire (1808)
- Pair de France (1814)
- Pair héréditaire (1815)
- Duc pair (1817)
- Prince du Saint-Empire and Serene Highness (Austria 1808 and 1830)
- Duc de Bouillon (1814 and 1816 through succession of the House of La Tour d'Auvergne)

The family's many branches held the titles of Prince de Léon, Prince de Montauban, Prince de Rochefort, etc. although none of these titles were genuinely created.

== Estates ==
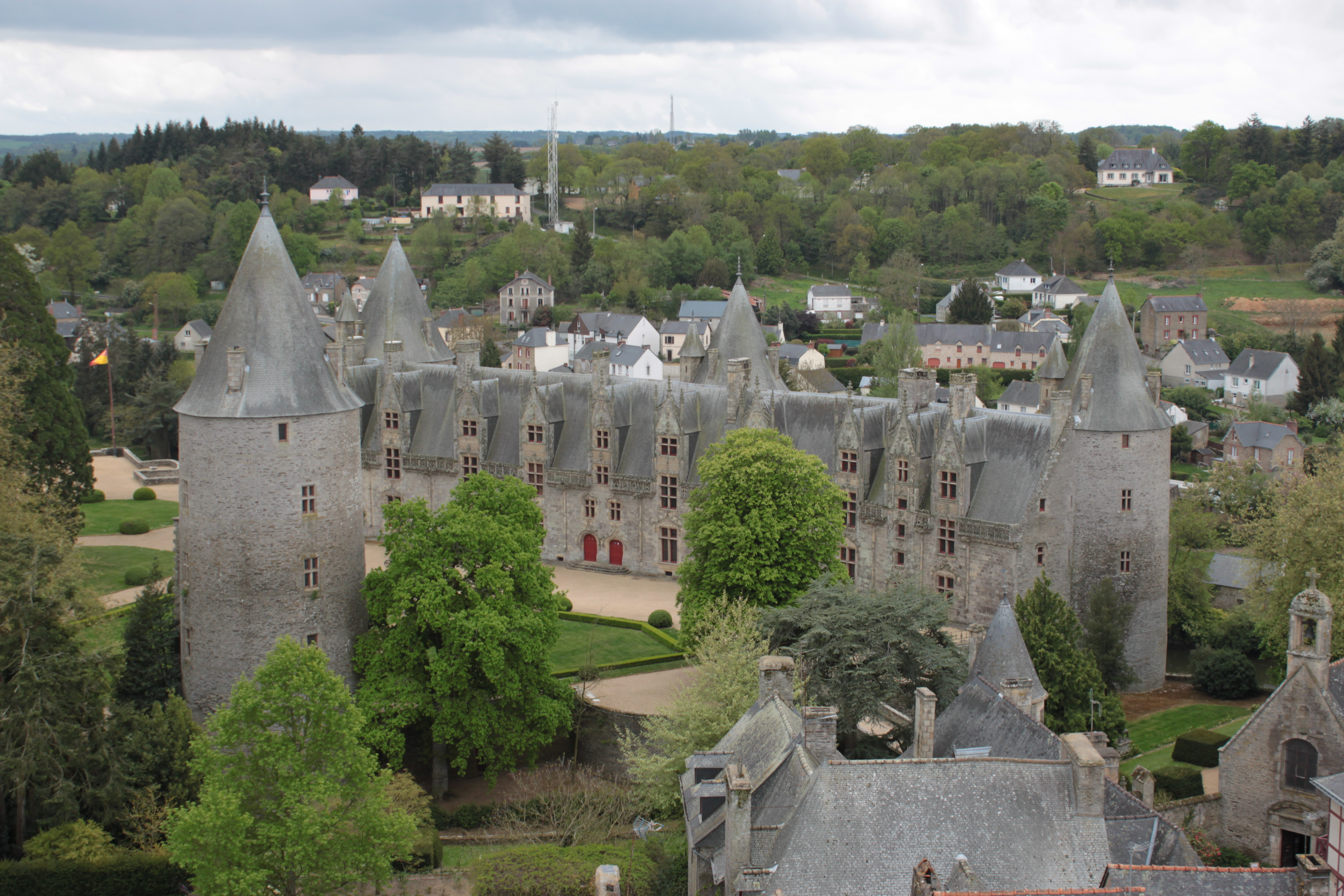
Josselin Castle

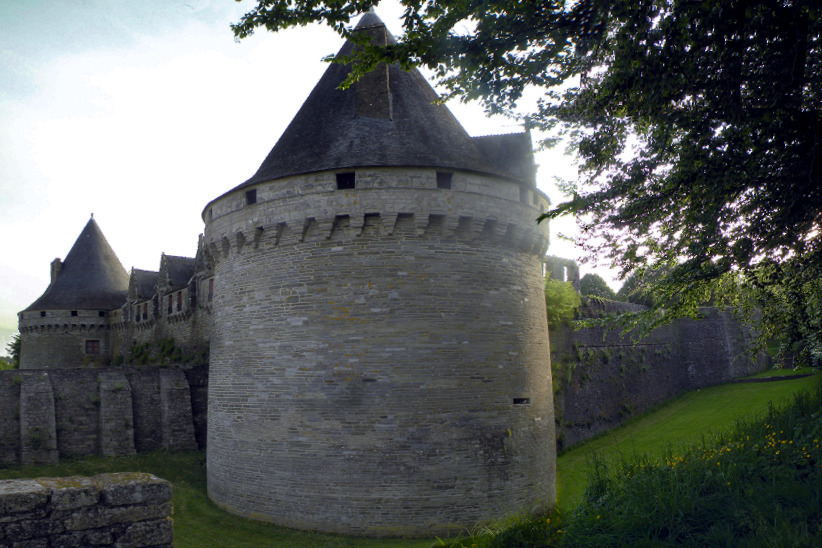
Pontivy Castle

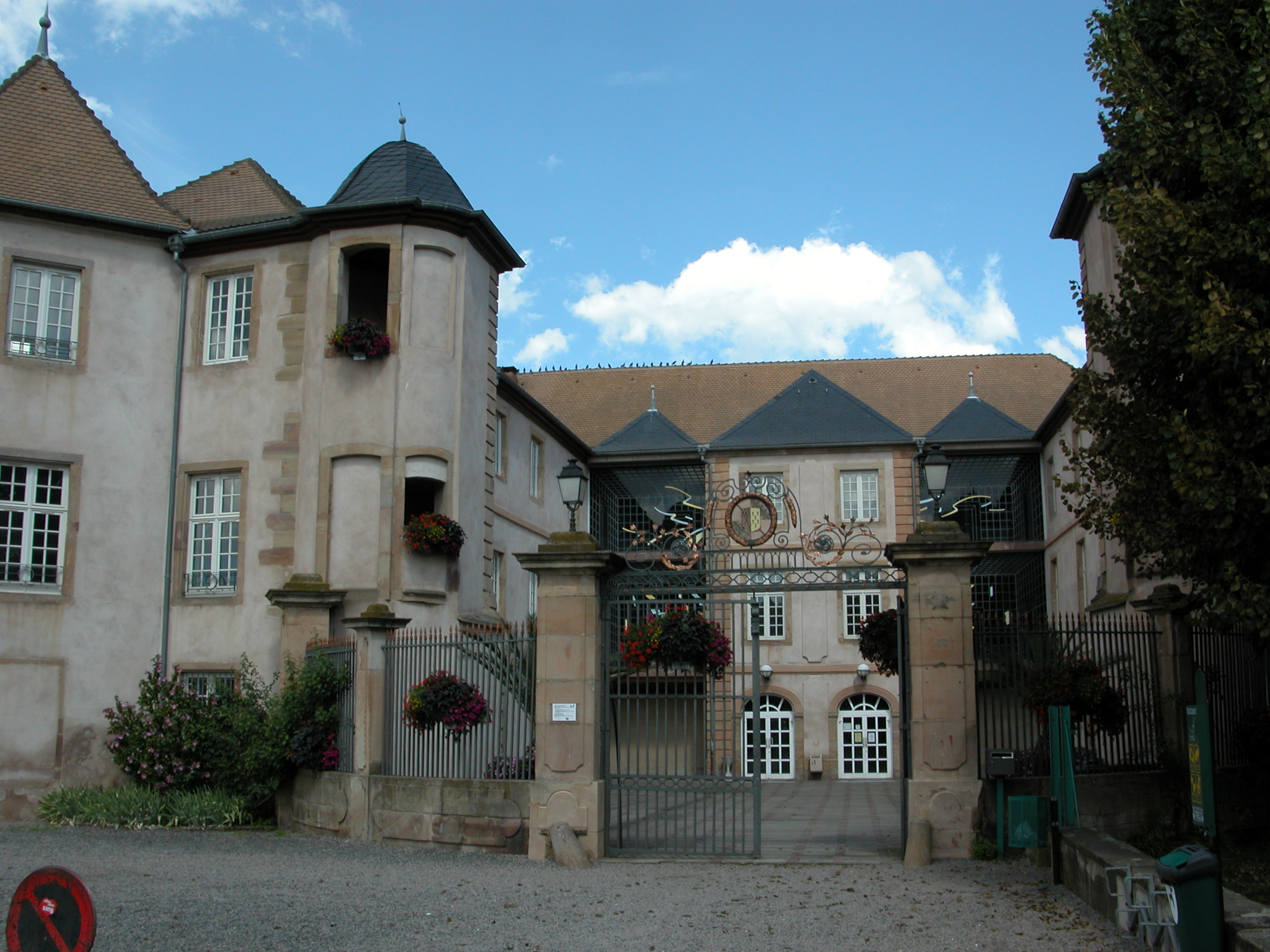
Château des Rohan in Mutzig, Alsace (completed in 1673)

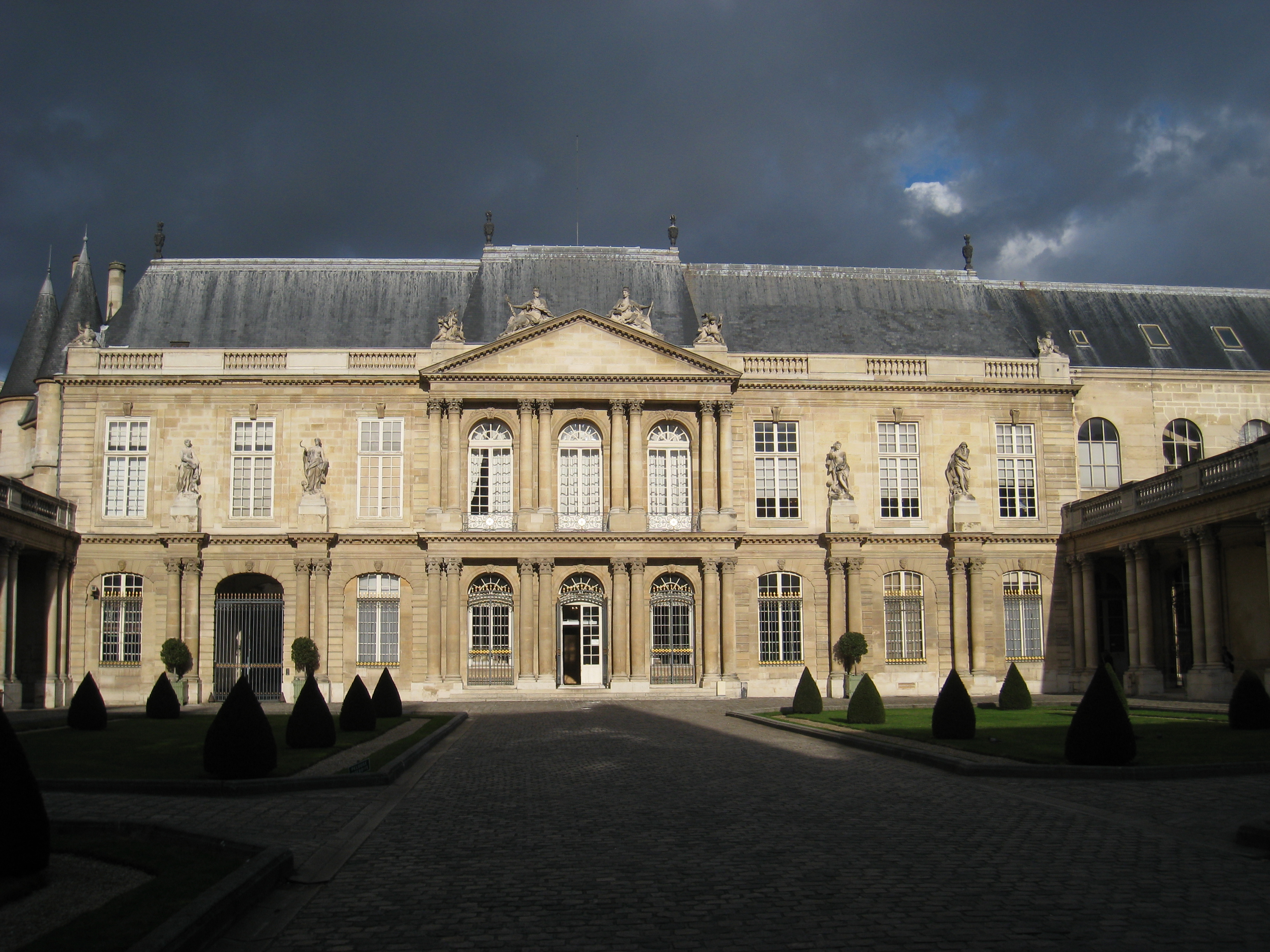
Hôtel de Rohan-Soubise, Paris (completed in 1705)

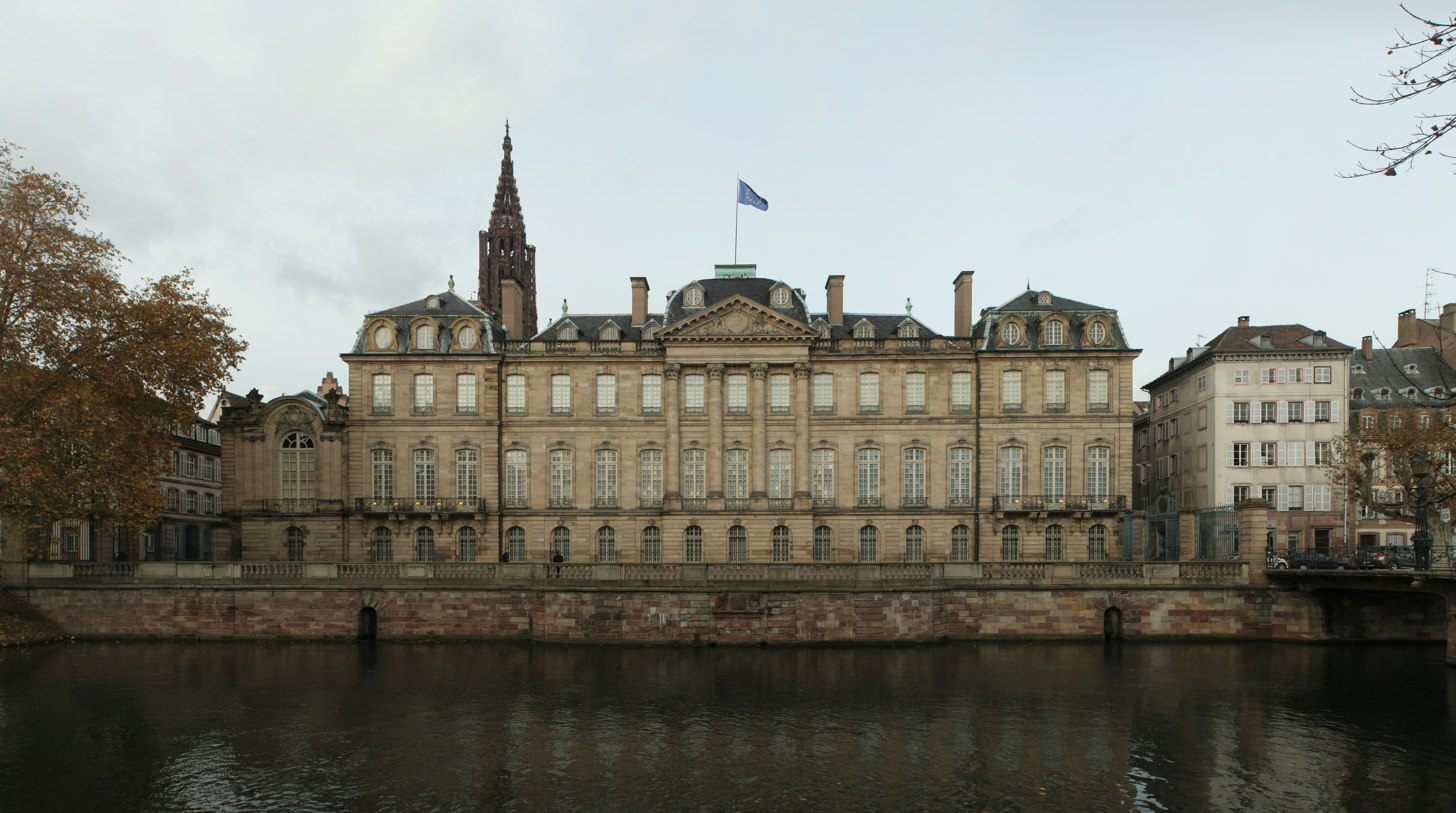
Palais Rohan in Strasbourg, Alsace (completed in 1742)

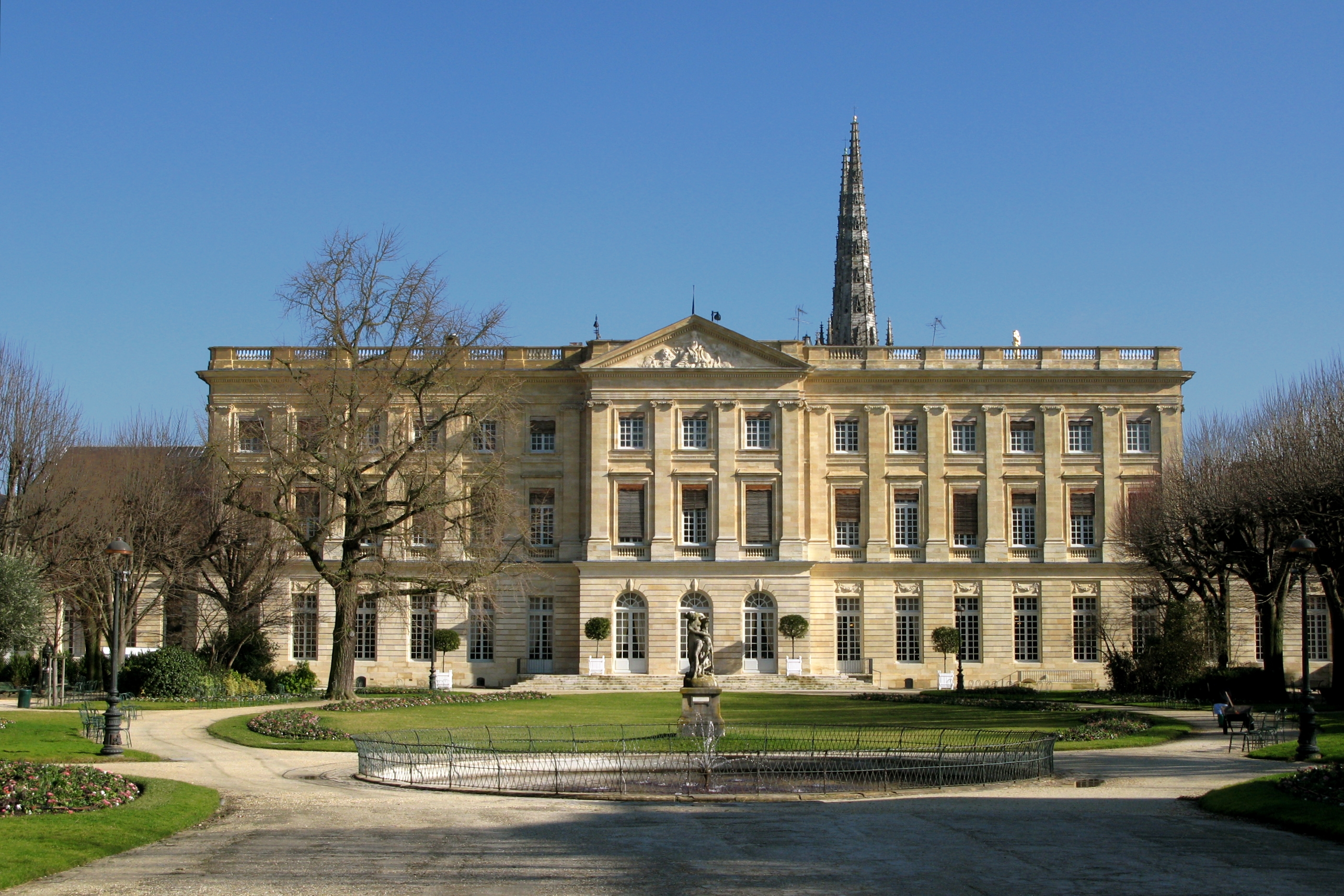
Palais Rohan in Bordeaux, Aquitaine (completed in 1774)

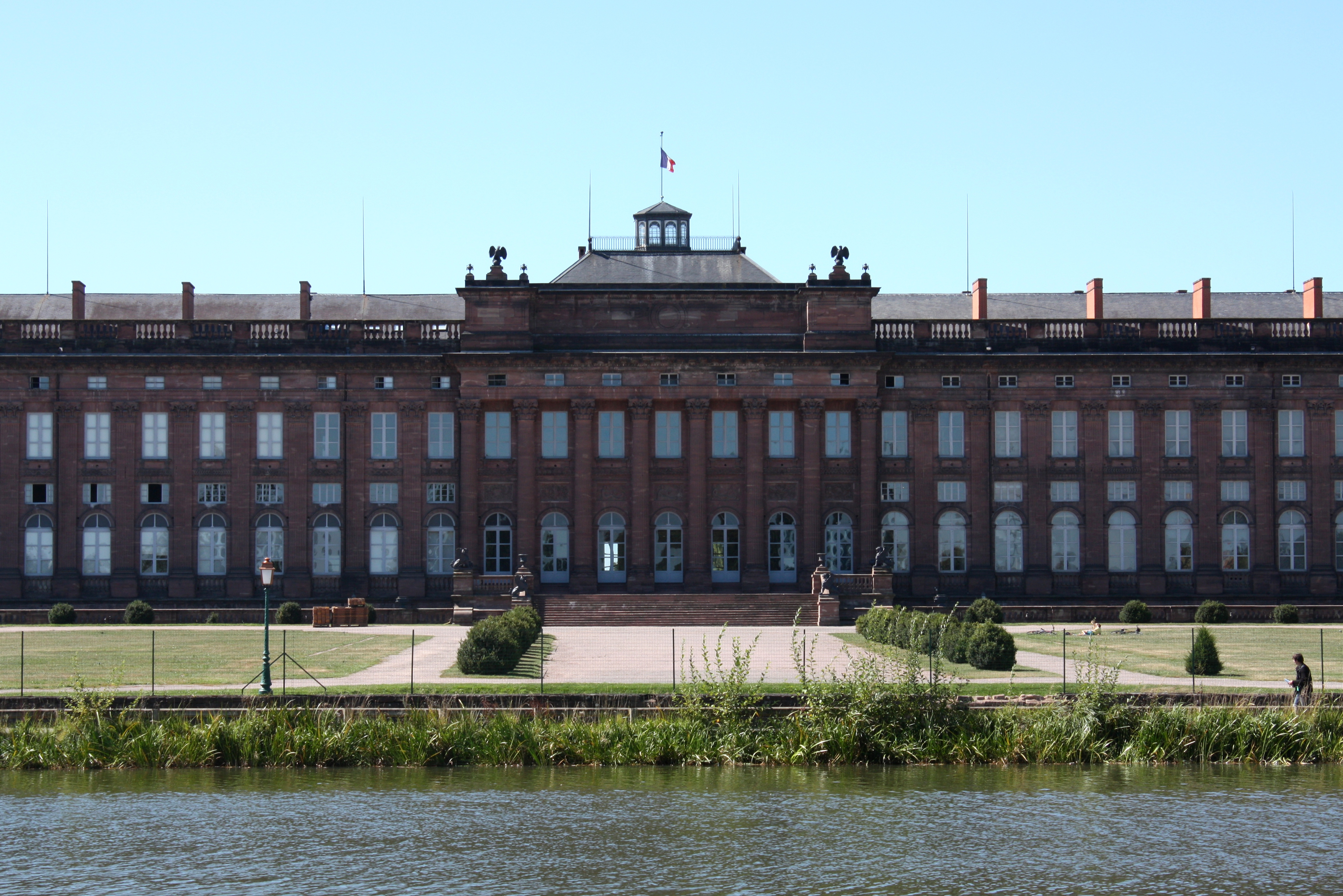
Château des Rohan in Saverne, Alsace (completed in 1790)

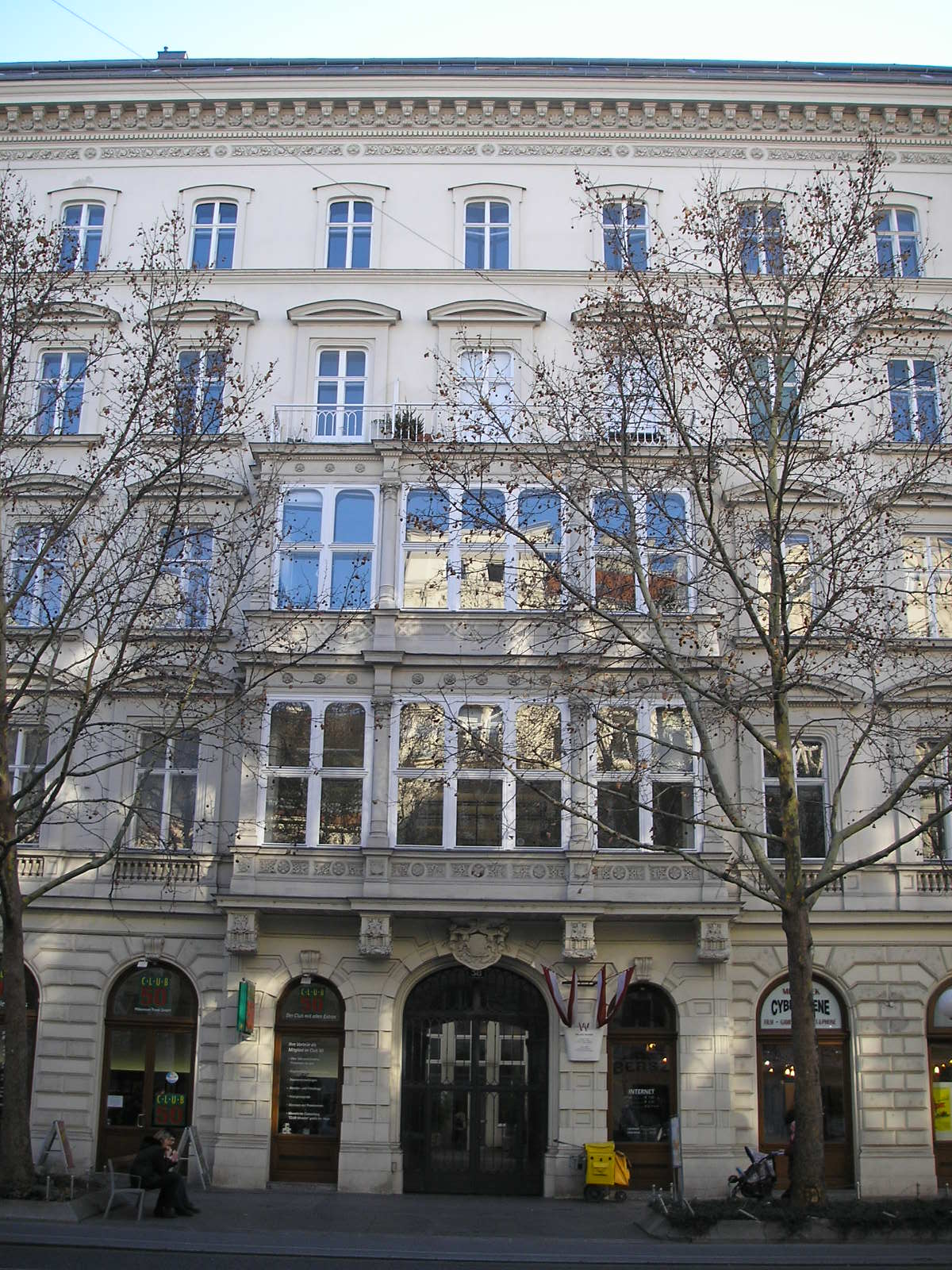
Palais Rohan in Vienna, Austria (completed in 1864)

- Rohan Castle in Saverne (now a museum)
- Palais Rohan in Strasbourg for the bishop-princes (it now hosts three museums)
- Episcopal palace of Bordeaux (now the city hall)
- Josselin Castle (Morbihan)
- Pontivy Castle (Morbihan)
- La Roche-Maurice Castle (Finistère)
- Château de Joyeuse Garde in La Forest-Landerneau (Finistère)
- Château de Mortiercrolles in Saint-Quentin-les-Anges (Mayenne)
- Château du Verger in Seiches-sur-le-Loir (Maine-et-Loire)
- Château de Blain (Loire-Atlantique)
- Château du Gué de Lisle (Côtes-d'Armor)
- Coupvray Castle (Seine-et-Marne)
- Hôtel de Rohan in Soubise (now the town hall)
- Rochefort-en-Yvelines Castle (Yvelines)
- Sainte-Maure-de-Touraine Castle (Indre-et-Loire)
- Sychrov Castle (Bohemia)
- Palais Rohan in Prague (Czech Republic)
- Palais Rohan in Vienna (Austria)
- The Hôtel de Rohan (also known as Hôtel de Rohan-Strasbourg for it used to be the residence of the bishops belonging the branch living in Strasbourg — see supra: Clergy) and the Hôtel de Soubise, in Le Marais, which form an ensemble that hosts part of the Archives Nationales nowadays.
- The Hôtel de Rohan-Guémené, also known as the "Maison de Victor Hugo" (who lived only in a small part of the hôtel), is located at 6 Place des Vosges and went to the rue des Tournelles and the Impasse Guéménée.
- The Hôtel de Rohan-Montbazon, 29 rue du Faubourg Saint-Honoré.
- The Hôtel de Soubise in Saint-Germain-en-Laye, now Café "Le Soubise".

== See also ==
- Duke of Brittany
- Duchy of Montbazon
- Duke of Rohan
- French nobility
- List of French peerages
- Almanach de Gotha
- Bohemian nobility
- Josselin
- Rohan Castle
- Princess of Soubise
- Hôtel de Soubise, Paris
- Hôtel de Rohan, Paris
- Hôtel de Rohan-Guéméné, Paris
- House of Rohan-Chabot
- Palais Rohan, Bordeaux
- Palais Rohan, Strasbourg
- Château des Rohan (Mutzig)
- Palais Rohan, Prague
- Rohan, Morbihan
- Sychrov Castle
- Lysá nad Labem

== Sources ==
- Alain Boulaire, Les Rohan, éd. France-Empire, 2001;
- W. & R. Chambers, Chambers' encyclopædia: A dictionary of universal knowledge, 1891, p. 764;
- Jean-Claude Fauveau, Le Prince Louis Cardinal de Rohan-Guéméné ou les diamants du roi, L'Harmattan, 2007;
- Charles Floquet Au coeur de l'Arcoat, Editions France Empire Paris, 1982;
- Bertrand Galimard Flavigny, Histoire de l'ordre de Malte, Paris, Perrin, 2005;
- Yvonig Gicquel, Alain IX de Rohan, 1382–1462, Éditions Jean Picollec, 1986;
- Yvonig Gicquel, Jean II de Rohan ou l'indépendance brisée de la Bretagne, Éditions Jean Picollec, 1994;
- Laurent Guitton, Un vicomte dans la cité : Jean II de Rohan et Dinan (1488–1516), Annales de Bretagne et des pays de l'Ouest vol. 114, no 2, 2007;
- Suzanne d'Huart, Archives Rohan-Bouillon, Inventaire, 1970, Paris, Archives Nationales, 246 p., genealogical charts (répertoire imprimé de la sous-série 273 AP, Archives Nationales);
- Prosper Jean Levot, Biographie bretonne: recueil de notices sur tous les Bretons, vol. 2;
- Georges Martin, Histoire et généalogie de la Maison de Rohan, 1998, Lyon, 1 vol. in 8°, 256 p. ill.;
- Éric Mension-Rigau, Les Rohan, Histoire d'une grande famille, Perrin, 2017, 320 p., read online;
- Pierre-Hyacinthe Morice, Mémoires pour servir de preuves à l'histoire ecclésiastique et civile de Bretagne, 1742–1746;
- Frédéric Morvan, Alain VI, vicomte de Rohan, ou l'origine de la fortune des Rohan, Bulletin et mémoires de la Société polymatique du Morbihan, vol. CXXXIV, 2008, p. 79–122;
- Frédéric Morvan, La Chevalerie bretonne et la formation de l'armée ducale 1260–1341, Presses Universitaires de Rennes, 2009, Annexes Généalogie n°35 « les Rohan »;
- Frédéric Morvan, Les règlements des conflits de succession dans la noblesse bretonne au XIIIème siècle, 2010, accessed 8 October 2013;
- Frédéric Morvan, Les Chevaliers bretons. Entre Plantagenets et Capétiens du milieu XIIe siècle au milieu du XIIIe siècle éditions Coop Breizh, Spézet 2014, « Généalogie des Rohan », 286;
- Claude Muller, Le siècle des Rohan : une dynastie de cardinaux en Alsace au XVIIIème siècle, La Nuée bleue, Strasbourg, 2006;
- Tudchentil. Inventaire 4/23;
- Musée protestant. Henri de Rohan (1574–1638);
- Les Protestants bretons. Les Salles de Rohan;
- Revue des deux mondes.
