= House of Rohan-Chabot =

French noble family

House of Rohan-Chabot Maison de Rohan-Chabot
- Parent house: House of Rohan (enatic); House of Chabot (agnatic)
- Origin: Kingdom of France
- Founded: 1645; 381 years ago
- Founder: Henri Chabot
- Current head: Josselin de Rohan-Chabot, 14th Duke of Rohan
- Titles: See list
- Estate: Josselin Castle

The House of Rohan-Chabot (French: Maison de Rohan-Chabot; [ʁɔɑ̃ ʃabo]) is a distinguished French noble family. It was established as a result of the marriage in 1645 between Henri Chabot and Marguerite de Rohan, the sole heir of the Duchy of Rohan.

Members of the family held significant military positions within the Kingdom of France and political functions where they represented Morbihan.

== History ==
The Rohan-Chabot family was founded by Henri Chabot (1616–1655), Lord of Saint-Aulaye (son of Henriette de Lur and her husband Charles Chabot, Lord of Saint-Gelais, Saint-Aulaye, a younger son of the de Jarnac family).

In 1645 he married Marguerite de Rohan (1617–1684), only child and heir of Henry II of Rohan, first Duke of Rohan (1603) by his wife, Marguerite de Béthune.

Following his marriage, Henri Chabot was created Duke of Rohan and Peer of France in 1648 by Cardinal Mazarin, during the reign of King Louis XIV.

The Rohan-Chabot family is the eldest branch of the House of Chabot, a French noble family originally from Poitou.

== Genealogy ==
Genealogy of the House of Rohan-Chabot

 └──> Henri II de Rohan (25/08/1579 in Blain – 28/02/1638 in Geneva), Viscount then Duke of Rohan, Prince of Léon, Lord of Blain, generalissimo of the Protestant armies, Ambassador of France, Colonel-general of the Swiss and Grisons
     x (1605) Marguerite de Béthune-Sully (1595-1660)[3]
     │
     └──> Marguerite de Rohan (1617-09/04/1684 in Paris), Duchess of Rohan, Lady of Lorges
          x (06/06/1645 in Paris) Henri Chabot (c. 1615-27/02/1655 in Chanteloup), Lord of Apremont and Saint-Aulaye, Duke of Rohan, gouvernor and lieutenant-general of Anjou, son Charles Chabot (?-26/08/1626), Lord of Saint-Aulaye, Saint-Gelais and Mussidan, and Henriette de Lur.
          │
          ├──> Anne Julie de Rohan-Chabot (1648-04/02/1709 in Paris)
          │    x (17/04/1663) François de Rohan-Guéméné a.k.a. François de Rohan-Soubise (1630-24/08/1712 in Paris), prince de Soubise, Count of Rochefort
          │
          ├──> Louis I de Rohan-Chabot (03/11/1652 in Paris – 17/08/1727 in Paris), Duke of Rohan, peer of France
          │    x (28/08/1678 in Saint-Cloud) Marie-Élisabeth Catherine Crespin du Bec (1661-27/03/1743 in Paris)[3]
          │    │
          │    ├──> Louis II Bretagne Alain de Rohan-Chabot (26/09/1679 in Paris – 10/08/1738 in Paris), Duke of Rohan, peer of France
          │    │    x (06/03/1708 in Paris) Françoise de Roquelaure, daughter of Antoine Gaston de Roquelaure (1682-1740)[2]
          │    │    │
          │    │    ├──> Louis-Marie-Bretagne Dominique de Rohan-Chabot (17/01/1710 in Paris – 28/11/1791 in Nice), Duke of Rohan, peer of France, Maréchal de camp, lieutenant general of the King's armies
          │    │    │    x (19/12/1735) Charlotte Rosalie de Châtillon (1719-1758), daughter of Alexis de Châtillon-sur-Marne
          │    │    │    x (23/05/1758) Charlotte Émilie de Crussol d'Uzès (1732-1791), daughter of Charles-Emmanuel de Crussol
          │    │    │
          │    │    ├──> Louis-François de Rohan-Chabot (1712-1743), Abbot of Saint-Sauveur-le-Vicomte
          │    │    │
          │    │    ├──>  Henriette Marie-Louise Armande Julie de Rohan-Chabot (30/03/1712-11/03/1784)
          │    │    │    x (24/02/1739) Daniel François de Gelas de Voisins d'Ambres (1686-14/02/1762), son of François de Gélas de Lautrec[2]
          │    │    │
          │    │    ├──> Marie-Armande de Rohan-Chabot (04/08/1713-1784), life prioress of Notre-Dame-de-Bon-Secours
          │    │    │
          │    │    ├──> Charlotte-Félicité Antoinette de Rohan-Chabot (1718-1750)
          │    │    │    x (1739) José Diego Gutiérrez de Los Ríos (?-1745), Count of Los Ríos and Fernán Núñez
          │    │    │
          │    │    └──> Louis-Auguste de Rohan-Chabot (1722-1753), Maréchal de camp
          │    │         x (1752) Marie-Jeanne Olympe de Bonnevie (1736-1757)
          │    │
          │    ├──> Marie-Marguerite Françoise de Rohan-Chabot a.k.a. Mademoiselle de Rohan (25/12/1680-28/01/1706) 
          │    │    x (12/05/1700) Louis-Pierre Engelbert de La Marck (?-1750), Count of Mark and Schleiden, Baron of Lumain and Devaing, Lord of Kerpen, Saffembourg, Gueltdorf, Bologna, hereditary solicitor of the Marquisate of Franchimont, Imperial Count, Knight of the King's Orders, son of François-Antoine de La Marck
          │    │
          │    ├──> Anne-Henriette Charlotte de Rohan-Chabot a.k.a. Mademoiselle de Léon (18/01/1682 in Paris – 12/05/1751 in Paris)
          │    │    x (10/06/1710) Alphonse François Dominique de Berghes (03/08/1679-04/04/1720 in Brussels), Prince of Berghes, Grandee of Spain, Knight of the Golden Fleece, son of Philippe-François de Berghes
          │    │
          │    ├──> Guy Auguste de Rohan-Chabot a.k.a. the Knight of Rohan (18/08/1683-13/09/1760 in Paris), Maréchal de camp, lieutenant general of the armies
          │    │    x (08/02/1729) Marie Yvonne Sylvie du Breil de Rays (1712-15/07/1740), daughter of the Count du Breil de Rays[2]
          │    │    │
          │    │    ├──> Marie-Charlotte Sylvie de Rohan-Chabot (12/12/1729-26/03/1807)
          │    │    │    x (07/09/1749) Jean-Baptiste Louis de Clermont-Tonnerre (?-1761), Count of Clermont-d'Amboise, Marquis of Renel
          │    │    │    x (14/03/1764) Charles Juste de Beauvau (1720-1793), Prince of Beauvau-Craon
          │    │    │
          │    │    ├──> Louis-Antoine Auguste de Rohan-Chabot (20/04/1733-29/10/1807 in Paris), Duke of Rohan, peer of France, Maréchal de camp, lieutenant general, Knight of the Order of the Holy Spirit
          │    │    │    x (12/04/1757) Élisabeth Louise de La Rochefoucauld (17/06/1740-12/12/1786), daughter of Jean-Baptiste-Louis de La Rochefoucauld de Roye, Duke of Anville, Marquis of Roucy, lieutenant-general of the Galleys of France, chef d'escadre of the naval armies, and Marie-Louise-Nicole de La Rochefoucauld de La Rocheguyon[3]
          │    │    │    │
          │    │    │    ├──> Alexandre-Louis Auguste de Rohan-Chabot (03/12/1761 in Paris – 08/02/1816 in Paris), Duke of Rohan, peer of France, Maréchal de camp, Colonel of the Régiment Royal of the County of Artois, lieutenant general of the King's armies, First Gentleman of the King's Chamber
          │    │    │    │    x (20/06/1785 in Montmorency) Anne Louise Madeleine Élisabeth de Montmorency (08/07/1771-20/11/1828 in Paris), daughter of Anne-Léon, Baron of Montmorency, Marquis of Fosseux, Duke of Beaufort, and Charlotte-Anne-Françoise de Montmorency-Luxembourg, Duchess of Beaufort-Montmorency[3]
          │    │    │    │    │
          │    │    │    │    ├──> Louis-François Auguste de Rohan-Chabot (29/02/1788 in Paris – 08/02/1833 in Chenecey), Duke of Rohan, peer of France, Imperial Count, Archbishop of Auch, Archbishop of Besançon, Cardinal
          │    │    │    │    │    x (02/08/1808) Marie Georgine Armandine de Sérent (1789-10/01/1815)[2]
          │    │    │    │    │
          │    │    │    │    ├──> Anne-Louis Fernand de Rohan-Chabot (14/10/1789 in Paris – 10/09/1869 in Reuil-en-Brie), Duke of Rohan, peer of France, Maréchal de camp, Aide de camp of the Duke of Berry, Squire of the Duke of Bordeaux, Commander of the Legion of Honnour, Knight of Saint-Louis and of the Military Merit of Bavaria
          │    │    │    │    │    x (18/05/1817) Joséphine Françoise de Gontaut-Biron de Saint-Blancard (09/10/1796 in London – 23/03/1844), daughter of Charles Michel de Gontaut, Viscount of Gontaut-Biron-Saint-Blancard, lieutenant-general, commander of Saint-Louis, and Marie-Louise-Joséphine de Montault de Navailles[3]
          │    │    │    │    │    │
          │    │    │    │    │    ├──> Charles Louis Josselin de Rohan-Chabot (12/12/1819 in Paris – 06/08/1893 in Josselin), Duke of Rohan
          │    │    │    │    │    │    x (29/06/1843) Octavie Rouillé de Boissy (22/03/1824-25/02/1866), daughter of Hilaire-Etienne-Octave Rouillé, Marquis of Boissy, and Amélie-Charlotte-Julie de Musnier de Folleville[3]
          │    │    │    │    │    │    │
          │    │    │    │    │    │    ├──> Alain Charles Louis de Rohan-Chabot (01/12/1844 in Paris – 06/01/1914 in Paris), Duke of Rohan, deputy of Morbihan
          │    │    │    │    │    │    │    x (26/06/1872) Marie Marguerite Henriette Antoinette Amable Herminie de La Brousse de Verteillac (28/07/1853 in Paris – 13/04/1926 in Paris), poet, daughter of César Augustin de La Brousse, Marquis of Verteillac, Baron of La Tour-Blanche and Marie-Henriette de Leuze[3]
          │    │    │    │    │    │    │    │
          │    │    │    │    │    │    │    ├──> Marie-Joséphine de Rohan-Chabot (10/04/1873 in Paris – 10/04/1903)
          │    │    │    │    │    │    │    │    x (30/06/1891 in Paris) Napoléon Louis Eugène Alexandre Anne Emmanuel de Talleyrand-Périgord (22/03/1867-27/09/1951), Count of Talleyrand-Périgord[3]
          │    │    │    │    │    │    │    │
          │    │    │    │    │    │    │    ├──> Marie Augustine de Rohan-Chabot (24/05/1876 in Paris – 03/10/1951 in Paris), writer
          │    │    │    │    │    │    │    │    x (02/02/1897 in Paris) Lucien-Charles-David-Napoléon Murat (08/07/1870 in Mustapha – 20/12/1933 in Rabat), Prince Murat[3]
          │    │    │    │    │    │    │    │    x (22/11/1934 in Rome) Louis Charles Pineton de Chambrun (10/02/1875 in Washington – 05/11/1952 in Paris), Count of Chambrun, diplomat, writer
          │    │    │    │    │    │    │    │
          │    │    │    │    │    │    │    ├──> Josselin Charles Marie Joseph Gabriel Henri de Rohan-Chabot (01/04/1879 in Paris – 13/07/1916 in Bray-sur-Somme), Duke of Rohan, deputy of Morbihan
          │    │    │    │    │    │    │    │    x (11/06/1906) Marguerite-Marie de Rohan-Chabot (03/07/1887-25/09/1976) (see lower)[3]
          │    │    │    │    │    │    │    │    │
          │    │    │    │    │    │    │    │    ├──> Charlotte de Rohan-Chabot (15/08/1907-?)
          │    │    │    │    │    │    │    │    │    x (31/07/1929) François de Clermont-Tonnerre, Count of Clermont-Tonnerre
          │    │    │    │    │    │    │    │    │
          │    │    │    │    │    │    │    │    ├──> Henriette de Rohan-Chabot (03/06/1910-?)
          │    │    │    │    │    │    │    │    │    x (02/08/1933) Raoul de Montferrand (?-14/07/1936), Count of Montferrand
          │    │    │    │    │    │    │    │    │
          │    │    │    │    │    │    │    │    └──> Alain Louis Auguste Marie de Rohan-Chabot (10/05/1913 in Paris – 27/05/1966 in Neuilly-sur-Seine), Duke of Rohan, French Resistant
          │    │    │    │    │    │    │    │         x (05/05/1937) Hélène Claire Marie de Liencourt (11/03/1915 in Paris)
          │    │    │    │    │    │    │    │         │
          │    │    │    │    │    │    │    │         ├──> Josselin Charles Louis Jean Marie de Rohan-Chabot (05/06/1938 in Suresnes), Duke of Rohan, politician, senator of Morbihan, President of the Regional Council of Brittany
          │    │    │    │    │    │    │    │         │    x (17/11/1973 in Crécy-en-Brie) Antoinette Boegner (15/06/1946 in Stockholm)
          │    │    │    │    │    │    │    │         │
          │    │    │    │    │    │    │    │         ├──> Annik de Rohan-Chabot (28/09/1939)
          │    │    │    │    │    │    │    │         │    x (09/07/1960) Juan Guillermo de Beistegui
          │    │    │    │    │    │    │    │         │
          │    │    │    │    │    │    │    │         ├──> Olivier de Rohan-Chabot (08/09/1941 in Perros-Guirec), President of the Société des amis de Versailles, President of the association La Sauvegarde de l'art français
          │    │    │    │    │    │    │    │         │
          │    │    │    │    │    │    │    │         ├──> Marguerite de Rohan-Chabot (13/08/1943)
          │    │    │    │    │    │    │    │         │    x (21/09/1974) Yves Aubert du Petit-Thouars, Count of Petit-Thouars
          │    │    │    │    │    │    │    │         │
          │    │    │    │    │    │    │    │         └──> Patrick de Rohan-Chabot (09/12/1944)
          │    │    │    │    │    │    │    │              x Catherine Payen
          │    │    │    │    │    │    │    │
          │    │    │    │    │    │    │    ├──> Françoise de Rohan-Chabot (07/06/1881-25/01/1957)
          │    │    │    │    │    │    │    │    x (01/10/1900) Charles de Riquet (?-29/05/1960), Duke of Caraman
          │    │    │    │    │    │    │    │
          │    │    │    │    │    │    │    └──> Jehan de Rohan-Chabot (27/06/1884-10/05/1968)
          │    │    │    │    │    │    │         x (10/11/1906) Anne de Talhouët-Roy (22/02/1887-07/12/1964)
          │    │    │    │    │    │    │         │
          │    │    │    │    │    │    │         ├──> Hermine de Rohan-Chabot (22/08/1907-?)
          │    │    │    │    │    │    │         │    x (15/12/1928) Charles de Cossé, Count of Cossé-Brissac
          │    │    │    │    │    │    │         │
          │    │    │    │    │    │    │         ├──> Marguerite de Rohan-Chabot (06/11/1908-?)
          │    │    │    │    │    │    │         │    x (24/06/1929) Hugues du Cheyron du Pavillon (21/07/1940), Count of Cheyron du Pavillon
          │    │    │    │    │    │    │         │    x (06/08/1951) Pierre Pénin de La Raudière
          │    │    │    │    │    │    │         │
          │    │    │    │    │    │    │         ├──> Henry de Rohan-Chabot (13/09/1912-14/05/1940)
          │    │    │    │    │    │    │         │    x (08/10/1937) Catherine de Brémond d'Ars (03/05/1918 – January 2000)
          │    │    │    │    │    │    │         │    │
          │    │    │    │    │    │    │         │    ├──> Anne de Rohan-Chabot (20/07/1938)
          │    │    │    │    │    │    │         │    │    x (15/03/1960) Jacques Emmanuel de Bryas, Count of Bryas
          │    │    │    │    │    │    │         │    │
          │    │    │    │    │    │    │         │    └──> Chantal de Rohan-Chabot (23/07/1939)
          │    │    │    │    │    │    │         │         x (06/07/1957) Antoine de Moustier, Count of Moustier
          │    │    │    │    │    │    │         │
          │    │    │    │    │    │    │         └──> René de Rohan-Chabot (25/12/1913-01/09/1996 in Paris)
          │    │    │    │    │    │    │              x (25/09/1939) Marguerite de Vogüé (07/05/1920)
          │    │    │    │    │    │    │              │
          │    │    │    │    │    │    │              ├──> Marie de Rohan-Chabot (14/07/1940)
          │    │    │    │    │    │    │              │    x (14/03/1960) Jean Vincent de Saint-Phalle
          │    │    │    │    │    │    │              │
          │    │    │    │    │    │    │              ├──> Roselyne de Rohan-Chabot (19/08/1941)
          │    │    │    │    │    │    │              │    x (19/12/1962) Hervé de Carmoy, Count de Carmoy
          │    │    │    │    │    │    │              │
          │    │    │    │    │    │    │              ├──> Henri Pierre de Rohan-Chabot (07/12/1942)
          │    │    │    │    │    │    │              │    x (09/9/1966) Lorraine Burin de Roziers (14/01/1946)
          │    │    │    │    │    │    │              │
          │    │    │    │    │    │    │              ├──> Béatrice de Rohan-Chabot (29/11/1944)
          │    │    │    │    │    │    │              │    x (14/05/1969) Alexis de Pourtalès (11/01/1941 in Paris), Count of Pourtalès
          │    │    │    │    │    │    │              │
          │    │    │    │    │    │    │              ├──> Alix de Rohan-Chabot (17/10/1946)
          │    │    │    │    │    │    │              │    x (01/10/1970) Philippe de Missolz
          │    │    │    │    │    │    │              │
          │    │    │    │    │    │    │              ├──> Louise de Rohan-Chabot (20/01/1948)
          │    │    │    │    │    │    │              │    x (08/07/1970) Philippe Morand, Count Morand
          │    │    │    │    │    │    │              │
          │    │    │    │    │    │    │              ├──> Pascale de Rohan-Chabot (25/03/1951)
          │    │    │    │    │    │    │              │    x (21/06/1974) Didier Goudon de Lalande de l'Héraudière, Count Goudon de Lalande de l'Héraudière
          │    │    │    │    │    │    │              │
          │    │    │    │    │    │    │              └──> Emmanuel de Rohan-Chabot (17/07/1953)
          │    │    │    │    │    │    │                   x (17/09/1979) Elena Richieri (06/09/1957)
          │    │    │    │    │    │    │
          │    │    │    │    │    │    └──> Marie-Joséphine de Rohan-Chabot (07/06/1854-09/01/1927)
          │    │    │    │    │    │         x (18/06/1877) Odet de Montault (?-30/01/1881), Viscount of Montault
          │    │    │    │    │    │         x (14/06/1888) Arthur de Rougé (?-05/12/1913), Count of Rougé
          │    │    │    │    │    │
          │    │    │    │    │    ├──> Louise Joséphine de Rohan-Chabot (28/11/1822-20/11/1844)
          │    │    │    │    │    │    x (15/04/1841) Marie Alfred Charles Gaston de Béthisy (?-07/02/1882), Marquis of Béthisy
          │    │    │    │    │    │
          │    │    │    │    │    ├──> Louise-Anne de Rohan-Chabot (23/06/1824-14/05/1868 in Vienna)
          │    │    │    │    │    │    x (07/10/1846) Georg Alexander Esterházy von Galantha (01/07/1809-27/06/1856 in Berlin), Count of Esterházy
          │    │    │    │    │    │
          │    │    │    │    │    ├──> Charles-Fernand de Rohan-Chabot (16/06/1828-18/12/1908)
          │    │    │    │    │    │    x (01/06/1858) Marie-Augusta Baudon de Mony (24/07/1837-30/08/1889)
          │    │    │    │    │    │    │
          │    │    │    │    │    │    ├──> Auguste de Rohan-Chabot (22/10/1859-21/05/1928)
          │    │    │    │    │    │    │    x (07/06/1886) Félicie Olry-Roederer (03/02/1864-12/05/1894)
          │    │    │    │    │    │    │    │
          │    │    │    │    │    │    │    ├──> Marguerite de Rohan-Chabot (03/07/1887-25/09/1976)
          │    │    │    │    │    │    │    │    x (11/06/1906) Josselin Charles Marie Joseph Gabriel Henri de Rohan-Chabot (01/04/1879 in Paris – 13/07/1916 in Bray-sur-Somme), Duke of Rohan, peer of France, deputy of Morbihan (see above)
          │    │    │    │    │    │    │    │
          │    │    │    │    │    │    │    ├──> Jacques de Rohan-Chabot (05/03/1889-09/12/1958)
          │    │    │    │    │    │    │    │    x (27/11/1917) Nicole Hélène de Henin-Liétard-d'Alsace (17/08/1892-20/01/1958)
          │    │    │    │    │    │    │    │    │
          │    │    │    │    │    │    │    │    ├──> Hélène de Rohan-Chabot (26/07/1920)
          │    │    │    │    │    │    │    │    │    x (1940) Thierry de Clermont-Tonnerre, Count of Clermont-Tonnerre
          │    │    │    │    │    │    │    │    │    x (1955) Roger Georges Auguste Fougères
          │    │    │    │    │    │    │    │    │
          │    │    │    │    │    │    │    │    ├──> Guy Aldonce de Rohan-Chabot (01/07/1921 in Paris)
          │    │    │    │    │    │    │    │    │    x (11/01/1949) Alix Louise Marguerite de Luppé (29/06/1925)
          │    │    │    │    │    │    │    │    │
          │    │    │    │    │    │    │    │    └──> Charles de Rohan-Chabot (01/07/1925)
          │    │    │    │    │    │    │    │         x (01/08/1961) Paola Sanjust Di Teulada (15/05/1928-11/09/1974)
          │    │    │    │    │    │    │    │
          │    │    │    │    │    │    │    └──> Léonie de Rohan-Chabot (30/04/1894-12/07/1918)
          │    │    │    │    │    │    │         x (07/07/1914) Auguste de Mailly-Nesle (?-1955)
          │    │    │    │    │    │    │
          │    │    │    │    │    │    ├──> Louise de Rohan-Chabot (30/12/1860-09/10/1909)
          │    │    │    │    │    │    │    x (30/05/1886) Maurice Delaire (?-25/04/1906), Baron Delaire de Cambacérès
          │    │    │    │    │    │    │
          │    │    │    │    │    │    ├──> Marie Alice de Rohan-Chabot (29/04/1865-29/03/1950)
          │    │    │    │    │    │    │    x (02/06/1892) Édouard de Bastard de Saint-Denis (?-28/12/1908)
          │    │    │    │    │    │    │
          │    │    │    │    │    │    ├──> Guillaume de Rohan-Chabot (15/05/1867-13/12/1922)
          │    │    │    │    │    │    │    x (22/04/1901) Nadine de La Rousselière-Clouard (08/11/1877-22/02/1958)
          │    │    │    │    │    │    │    │
          │    │    │    │    │    │    │    ├──> Lydie de Rohan-Chabot (21/03/1906-?)
          │    │    │    │    │    │    │    │    x (09/01/1928) Charles de Lambilly (?-19/05/1944)
          │    │    │    │    │    │    │    │
          │    │    │    │    │    │    │    ├──> Ysabeau de Rohan-Chabot (30/01/1909-?)
          │    │    │    │    │    │    │    │    x (04/07/1930) Olivier de Rarécourt de La Vallée, Count of Pimodan
          │    │    │    │    │    │    │    │
          │    │    │    │    │    │    │    ├──> Fernand de Rohan-Chabot (04/07/1910 in Paris – ?)
          │    │    │    │    │    │    │    │    x (11/01/1939) Hedwige de Mun (07/11/1916-?)
          │    │    │    │    │    │    │    │    │
          │    │    │    │    │    │    │    │    ├──> Antoinette de Rohan-Chabot (27/10/1939 in Dammarie-lès-Lys)
          │    │    │    │    │    │    │    │    │    x (03/09/1966) François Vallet (26/12/1938 in Saumur)
          │    │    │    │    │    │    │    │    │
          │    │    │    │    │    │    │    │    ├──> Louis de Rohan-Chabot (07/12/1940 in Paris)
          │    │    │    │    │    │    │    │    │    x (27/06/1967) Marie Christine Lebaudy (21/08/1948)
          │    │    │    │    │    │    │    │    │
          │    │    │    │    │    │    │    │    ├──> Marie de Rohan-Chabot (02/04/1942)
          │    │    │    │    │    │    │    │    │    x (05/09/1964) Christian de Lassus Saint-Geniès (March 1941), Baron of Lassus Saint-Geniès
          │    │    │    │    │    │    │    │    │
          │    │    │    │    │    │    │    │    ├──> Béatrice de Rohan-Chabot (23/06/1943 in Paris)
          │    │    │    │    │    │    │    │    │    x (20/06/1964 in Dammarie-lès-Lys) François-Xavier Houzel (10/11/1939 in New York)
          │    │    │    │    │    │    │    │    │
          │    │    │    │    │    │    │    │    └──> Jacques de Rohan-Chabot (01/03/1946 in Paris – 1995)
          │    │    │    │    │    │    │    │         x (13/05/1972) Dominique Trévin
          │    │    │    │    │    │    │    │
          │    │    │    │    │    │    │    └──> Blandine de Rohan-Chabot (23/07/1916 in Paris – 22/11/1999 in Toulouse), nun
          │    │    │    │    │    │    │
          │    │    │    │    │    │    └──> Isabelle de Rohan-Chabot (22/03/1875-29/12/1960)
          │    │    │    │    │    │         x (07/11/1901) François Louis de Vaufleury (?-23/09/1934), Count of Malterre
          │    │    │    │    │    │
          │    │    │    │    │    ├──> Alexandrine-Amélie de Rohan-Chabot (26/03/1831-24/06/1907)
          │    │    │    │    │    │    x (12/06/1851) Henri Charles Louis de Beurges (?-08/05/1912), Count of Beurges
          │    │    │    │    │    │
          │    │    │    │    │    ├──> Henri-Léonor de Rohan-Chabot (06/05/1835-12/04/1922)
          │    │    │    │    │    │    x (04/07/1860) Adélaïde Berthe de Chabrol-Tournoël (27/07/1834-28/01/1929)[2]
          │    │    │    │    │    │    │
          │    │    │    │    │    │    ├──> Philippe de Rohan-Chabot (30/08/1861-05/01/1925)
          │    │    │    │    │    │    │    x (14/05/1894) Thérèse Leclerc de Juigné de Lassigny (05/10/1867-26/06/1938)
          │    │    │    │    │    │    │    │
          │    │    │    │    │    │    │    ├──> Henri de Rohan-Chabot (21/11/1897-?)
          │    │    │    │    │    │    │    │    x (12/10/1921) Josette de Giraud d'Agay (1898-?)
          │    │    │    │    │    │    │    │    │
          │    │    │    │    │    │    │    │    ├──> Philippe de Rohan-Chabot (30/08/1923)
          │    │    │    │    │    │    │    │    │    x (10/10/1959) Colette Le Compasseur Créqui Montfort de Courtivron
          │    │    │    │    │    │    │    │    │
          │    │    │    │    │    │    │    │    ├──> Anne de Rohan-Chabot (01/04/1925)
          │    │    │    │    │    │    │    │    │    x (07/09/1950) Robert Gèze
          │    │    │    │    │    │    │    │    │
          │    │    │    │    │    │    │    │    ├──> Marguerite de Rohan-Chabot (19/10/1927-2007)
          │    │    │    │    │    │    │    │    │
          │    │    │    │    │    │    │    │    ├──> Gérald de Rohan-Chabot (23/10/1930)
          │    │    │    │    │    │    │    │    │    x (07/01/1963) Marie Odile Flécher
          │    │    │    │    │    │    │    │    │
          │    │    │    │    │    │    │    │    └──> Gilbert de Rohan-Chabot (17/09/1935)
          │    │    │    │    │    │    │    │         x (01/09/1967) Yvonne Richard
          │    │    │    │    │    │    │    │
          │    │    │    │    │    │    │    └──> Edmé de Rohan-Chabot (28/12/1904-05/10/1972)
          │    │    │    │    │    │    │         x (06/06/1932) Laurence de Mun (03/03/1908)
          │    │    │    │    │    │    │         │
          │    │    │    │    │    │    │         └──> Thérèse de Rohan-Chabot (27/06/1935)
          │    │    │    │    │    │    │              x (06/06/1958) Bruno de Gasquet (? – avril 1976)
          │    │    │    │    │    │    │
          │    │    │    │    │    │    ├──> Sébran de Rohan-Chabot (27/02/1863-28/09/1936)
          │    │    │    │    │    │    │    x (26/05/1896) Éliane Thiroux de Gervilliers (06/03/1869-04/03/1953)
          │    │    │    │    │    │    │
          │    │    │    │    │    │    ├──> Louis de Rohan-Chabot (07/05/1865-06/12/1964)
          │    │    │    │    │    │    │    x (05/06/1901) Jeanne de Brye (19/07/1874-02/12/1946)
          │    │    │    │    │    │    │    │
          │    │    │    │    │    │    │    ├──> Léonor de Rohan-Chabot (29/09/1902-?)
          │    │    │    │    │    │    │    │    x (18/07/1935) Béatrix Le Cardinal de Kernier (22/05/1910-?)
          │    │    │    │    │    │    │    │    │
          │    │    │    │    │    │    │    │    ├──> Eudon de Rohan-Chabot (04/11/1936)
          │    │    │    │    │    │    │    │    │    x (26/06/1962) Solange de Monti de Rezé
          │    │    │    │    │    │    │    │    │
          │    │    │    │    │    │    │    │    ├──> Louis Mériadec de Rohan-Chabot (27/12/1937 in Bonnefontaine)
          │    │    │    │    │    │    │    │    │    x (27/06/1968 in Paris) Isabelle de Beaufremont-Courtenay (06/10/1944 in Montargis)
          │    │    │    │    │    │    │    │    │    │
          │    │    │    │    │    │    │    │    │    ├──> Marie-Liesse de Rohan-Chabot (23/06/1969 in Paris)
          │    │    │    │    │    │    │    │    │         x (19/06/1999 in Dreux) Eudes d'Orléans (18/03/1968 in Paris), Duke of Angoulême, son of Henri Philippe d'Orléans
          │    │    │    │    │    │    │    │    │
          │    │    │    │    │    │    │    │    ├──> Annaïg de Rohan-Chabot (06/06/1939)
          │    │    │    │    │    │    │    │    │    x (17/04/1962) Robert Ghislain d'Harcourt-Olonde (20/03/1936), Count of Harcourt-Olonde
          │    │    │    │    │    │    │    │    │
          │    │    │    │    │    │    │    │    ├──> Viviane de Rohan-Chabot (08/04/1941)
          │    │    │    │    │    │    │    │    │    x (26/06/1965) Yann Kergall
          │    │    │    │    │    │    │    │    │
          │    │    │    │    │    │    │    │    ├──> Gwénola de Rohan-Chabot (13/01/1944)
          │    │    │    │    │    │    │    │    │    x (29/04/1967) Régis du Fayet de La Tour
          │    │    │    │    │    │    │    │    │
          │    │    │    │    │    │    │    │    └──> Noluen de Rohan-Chabot (06/02/1949)
          │    │    │    │    │    │    │    │         x (September 1969) Pierre de Brye, Count of Brye
          │    │    │    │    │    │    │    │
          │    │    │    │    │    │    │    └──> Gaël de Rohan-Chabot (13/06/1906-?)
          │    │    │    │    │    │    │         x (09/11/1933) Marguerite de Chabrol-Tournoël (19/12/1903-16/03/1958)
          │    │    │    │    │    │    │         │
          │    │    │    │    │    │    │         ├──> Marthe de Rohan-Chabot (25/02/1935 in Paris)
          │    │    │    │    │    │    │         │    x (12/01/1958 in Paris) Jean Dominique de La Rochefoucauld (30/06/1931)
          │    │    │    │    │    │    │         │
          │    │    │    │    │    │    │         ├──> Sébran de Rohan-Chabot (10/03/1936)
          │    │    │    │    │    │    │         │    x (04/10/1947) Servilia Piccinoni-Adames
          │    │    │    │    │    │    │         │
          │    │    │    │    │    │    │         ├──> Jean Louis Marie Pierre de Rohan-Chabot (06/03/1940 in Caen)
          │    │    │    │    │    │    │         │    x (06/11/1962 in Paris) Joy Maria Bourlon de Rouvre (15/02/1942 in Cannes), painter
          │    │    │    │    │    │    │         │    │
          │    │    │    │    │    │    │         │    ├──> Emmanuel de Rohan-Chabot (13/12/1963), founding member and manager of the website Zeturf.com
          │    │    │    │    │    │    │         │    │    x Éléonore de Galard-Terraube
          │    │    │    │    │    │    │         │    │
          │    │    │    │    │    │    │         │    └──> Fabrice de Rohan-Chabot (08/07/1968), editor at Technikart and Trax
          │    │    │    │    │    │    │         │
          │    │    │    │    │    │    │         ├──> Louis de Rohan-Chabot (10/08/1943)
          │    │    │    │    │    │    │         │    x Martine Piat
          │    │    │    │    │    │    │         │
          │    │    │    │    │    │    │         x (08/11/1966) Claude de Beaufremont-Courtenay (30/06/1912-?)
          │    │    │    │    │    │    │
          │    │    │    │    │    │    └──> Jeanne de Rohan-Chabot (12/12/1873-26/03/1925)
          │    │    │    │    │    │         x (24/05/1898) Jacques Guiau (? – mars 1919), Marquis of Reverseaux
          │    │    │    │    │    │
          │    │    │    │    │    └──> Jeanne-Charlotte de Rohan-Chabot (01/01/1839-14/05/1929)
          │    │    │    │    │         x (07/03/1865) Arthur d'Anthoine (?-10/04/1911), Baron of Saint-Joseph
          │    │    │    │    │
          │    │    │    │    ├──> Adélaïde Henriette Antoinette Stéphanie de Rohan-Chabot (24/11/1793 in Brussels – 24/02/1869)
          │    │    │    │    │    x (24/11/1812) Aimé-Charles-Zacharie-Élisabeth de Gontaut-Biron (?-14/02/1840), Count of Gontaut-Biron
          │    │    │    │    │
          │    │    │    │    ├──> Marie-Charlotte Léontine de Rohan-Chabot (1796 in London – 15/03/1841)
          │    │    │    │    │    x (19/05/1817) Marie Antoine Camille Ernest de Lambertye (?-24/03/1862), Marquis of Lambertye and Gerbevillers
          │    │    │    │    │
          │    │    │    │    ├──> Anne-Louise Emma Zoë Clémentine de Rohan-Chabot (21/01/1800 in Münster – 28/01/1853)
          │    │    │    │    │    x (janvier 1822) François Marie Joseph d'Estourmel (?-13/12/1853), Count of Estourmel
          │    │    │    │    │
          │    │    │    │    └──> Louis-Charles Philippe Henri de Rohan-Chabot (26/03/1806-07/01/1872)
          │    │    │    │         x (19/11/1831) Sidonie de Biencourt (07/08/1810-03/10/1878)
          │    │    │    │         │
          │    │    │    │         ├──> Léontine de Rohan-Chabot (09/04/1833-20/12/1914)
          │    │    │    │         │    x (26/12/1860) Ferdinand Henri Hélion (?-17/06/1909), Marquis of Villeneuve-Bargemon
          │    │    │    │         │
          │    │    │    │         ├──> Guy de Rohan-Chabot (08/07/1836-04/10/1912), Pontifical Duke of Ravese in 1908
          │    │    │    │         │    x (28/02/1867) Jeanne Marie Terray de Morel-Vindé (29/11/1845-23/06/1880)
          │    │    │    │         │    │
          │    │    │    │         │    ├──> Marie Charles Gérald de Rohan-Chabot (28/09/1870-11/02/1964), Pontifical Duke of Ravese
          │    │    │    │         │    │    x (05/02/1895) Cécile Aubry-Vitet (06/04/1875-01/06/1934)
          │    │    │    │         │    │    │
          │    │    │    │         │    │    ├──> Geneviève Aliette de Rohan-Chabot (03/01/1896 in Compiègne – 19/11/1972 in Paris), archeologist
          │    │    │    │         │    │    │    x (03/03/1917) Jacquelin de Maillé de La Tour-Landry (?-27/07/1918), Marquis of Maillé
          │    │    │    │         │    │    │
          │    │    │    │         │    │    └──> Gilbert de Rohan-Chabot (13/01/1897 – July 1918), died for France
          │    │    │    │         │    │
          │    │    │    │         │    x (06/06/1888) Zefila Haywar (05/04/1840-29/02/1896)
          │    │    │    │         │
          │    │    │    │         ├──> Thibaut de Rohan-Chabot (27/01/1838-15/04/1913)
          │    │    │    │         │    x (22/06/1870) Jeanne Blanche Bourlon de Franqueville (1849-24/06/1884)
          │    │    │    │         │
          │    │    │    │         ├──> Catherine de Rohan-Chabot (05/11/1843-22/06/1941)
          │    │    │    │         │    x (16/05/1868) Henri Paul Marie Gérard de Pins (?-15/05/1889), Viscount of Pins
          │    │    │    │         │
          │    │    │    │         └──> Marie de Rohan-Chabot (04/09/1849-30/11/1934)
          │    │    │    │              x (10/02/1874) Pierre Adrien Edgar de Montesquiou-Fézensac (?-07/10/1894)
          │    │    │    │
          │    │    │    ├──> Alexandrine-Charlotte Sophie de Rohan-Chabot (03/10/1763 in Paris – 08/12/1839 in Paris)
          │    │    │    │    x (13/03/1780 in Paris) Louis Alexandre de La Rochefoucauld d'Anville (?-1792), Duke of La Rochefoucauld
          │    │    │    │    x (20/02/1810 in Paris) Boniface Louis André de Castellane (?-1837), Marquis of Castellane-Novejean 
          │    │    │    │
          │    │    │    └──> Armand-Charles Just de Rohan-Chabot (25/06/1767-02/12/1792)
          │    │    │
          │    │    ├──> Charles Rosalie de Rohan-Chabot (09/07/1740 in Paris – August 1813 in London), Lord of Clion, Maroite and Brassac, joint-Lord of the castellanies of Montagrier and Chapdeuil, Maréchal de camp
          │    │    │    x (17/12/1759 in Paris) Guyonne Hyacinthe de Pons Saint-Maurice (+ January 1761)[2]
          │    │    │    │
          │    │    │    ├──> Adélaïde-Louise Guyonne de Rohan-Chabot a.k.a. Mademoiselle de Jarnac (17/01/1761 in Paris – 22/01/1805 in Pau)
          │    │    │    │    x (18/05/1778 in Paris) Boniface Louis André de Castellane (?-1837), Marquis of Castellane-Novejean (parents of Boniface de Castellane)
          │    │    │    │    x Jean-Baptiste de La Rochefoucauld (?-22/01/1805 in Pau)
          │    │    │    │
          │    │    │    x (29/09/1776) Elizabeth Smith (1758-23/11/1843)
          │    │    │    │
          │    │    │    └──> Louis Guy Charles Guillaume de Rohan-Chabot (26/10/1780 in Jarnac – July 1875), Maréchal de camp
          │    │    │         x (1809) Isabella Fitzgerald, daughter of William Fitzgerald[2]
          │    │    │         │
          │    │    │         ├──> Olivia de Rohan-Chabot (1813-1899)
          │    │    │         │    x (06/08/1846) Adrien Jules de Lasteyrie du Saillant (29/10/1810 in Courpalay – 14/11/1883 in Paris), Marquis of Lasteyrie, Count of Saillant, politician, journalist, writer
          │    │    │         │
          │    │    │         └──> Philippe Ferdinand Auguste de Rohan-Chabot (02/06/1815-22/03/1875 in Courpalay), diplomat, ambassador of France in the United Kingdom
          │    │    │              x (10/12/1844) Géraldine Foley (?-1887), daughter of Thomas Foley
          │    │    │
          │    │    x (25/05/1744) Mary Apolonia Scolastica Stafford-Howard (17/02/1721-16/05/1769), daughter of William Howard[2]
          │    │
          │    └──> Charles-Annibal de Rohan-Chabot (14/01/1687-05/11/1762), Colonel of Infantry
          │         x (19/06/1715) Anne-Marie Louise Chabot (04/06/1690 in Jarnac – 27/08/1769 in Paris), Countess of Jarnac, Marchionness of Soubran
          │
          ├──> Jeanne Pélagie de Rohan-Chabot (1659-18/08/1698 in Versailles)
          │    x (29/05/1668) Alexandre Guillaume de Melun (?-16/02/1679), Prince of Épinoy, Knight of the King's Orders
          │
          └──> Marguerite Gabrielle Charlotte de Rohan-Chabot (?-17/06/1720)
               x (1662) Malo de Coëtquen (+ 24/04/1679), Marquis of Coëtquen, governor of Saint-Malo, son of Malo de Coëtquen[2]

== Notable members ==
=== Dukes of Rohan ===
- Louis-François-Auguste de Rohan-Chabot (1788–1833), 8th Duke of Rohan and peer of France, Imperial Count. He married Armandine de Sérent in 1808 and became a widower * Josselin-Charles-Louis-Jean-Marie de Rohan-Chabot (born 1938), 14th Duke of Rohan, senator of Morbihan until 2011, President of the Regional Council of Brittany until 2004.

=== Others ===
- Guy Auguste de Rohan-Chabot (1683–1760), a.k.a. the Knight of Rohan, Maréchal de camp in 1719, lieutenant general of the King's armies in 1734. He had Voltaire beaten following a quarrel at Adrienne Lecouvreur’s house. Seeking revenge, Voltaire was sent to the Bastille on the Duke's order, at the Cardinal of Rohan's request.
- Philippe-Ferdinand-Auguste de Rohan-Chabot (1815–1875), ambassador of the French Republic in the United Kingdom. He was the commissioner appointed by King Louis-Philippe to proceed to the exhumation of Napoleon I’s body in Saint Helena and its repatriation to France in 1840.

== Arms ==
Arms of the House of Rohan-Chabot

Quartered: 1 and 4 gules, nine mascles or put 3, 3, 3 (which is Rohan); 2 and 3 or, three chabots gules put in pale (which is Chabot).

== Titles ==
The house of Rohan-Chabot received the following titles:

- Duke of Rohan and peer of France by letters patent (December 1648), confirmed in 1704
- Count of the Holy Roman Empire (1810)
- Hereditary peer of France (1814 and 1815)
- Duke and peer (1817)
- Duke of Ravese par bref pontifical du 3 août 1908 (éteint en 1964)

The heir of the title Duke of Rohan traditionally bears the title Prince of Léon in his father's lifetime (courtesy title adopted in the 16th century by the Rohan family, who owned the Lordship of Léon, which was only called a viscounty in the Middle-Ages).

== Portraits ==
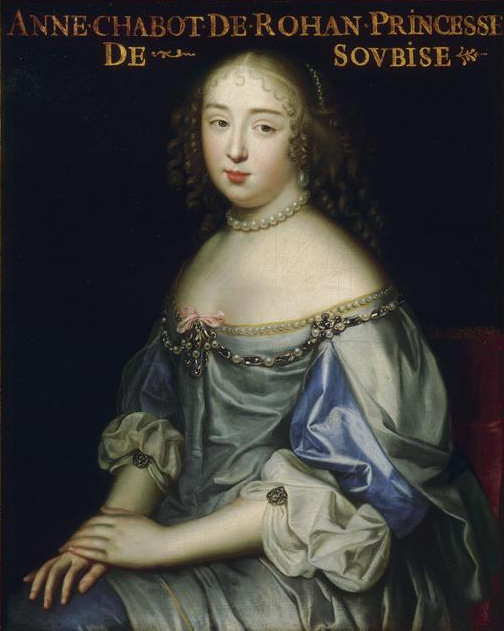
Anne de Rohan-Chabot (1648-1709), Princess of Soubise

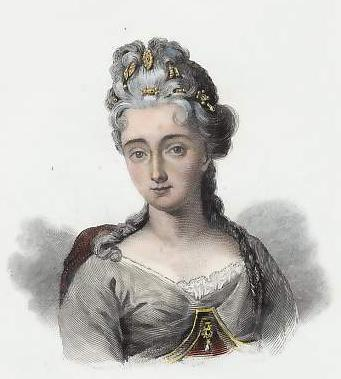
Jeanne Pélagie de Rohan-Chabot (1659-1698)

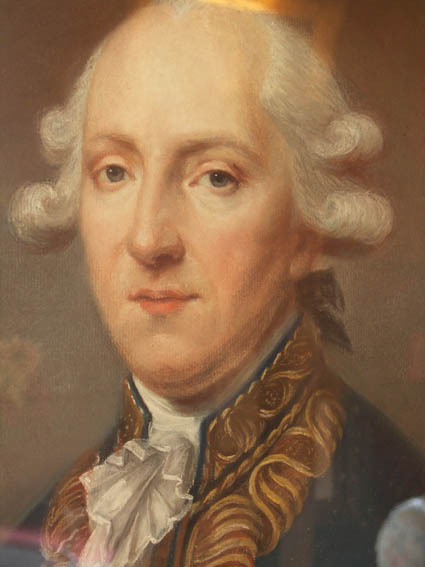
Louis-Antoine de Rohan-Chabot (1733-1807), Duke of Rohan, lieutenant general, Knight of the Order of the Holy Spirit

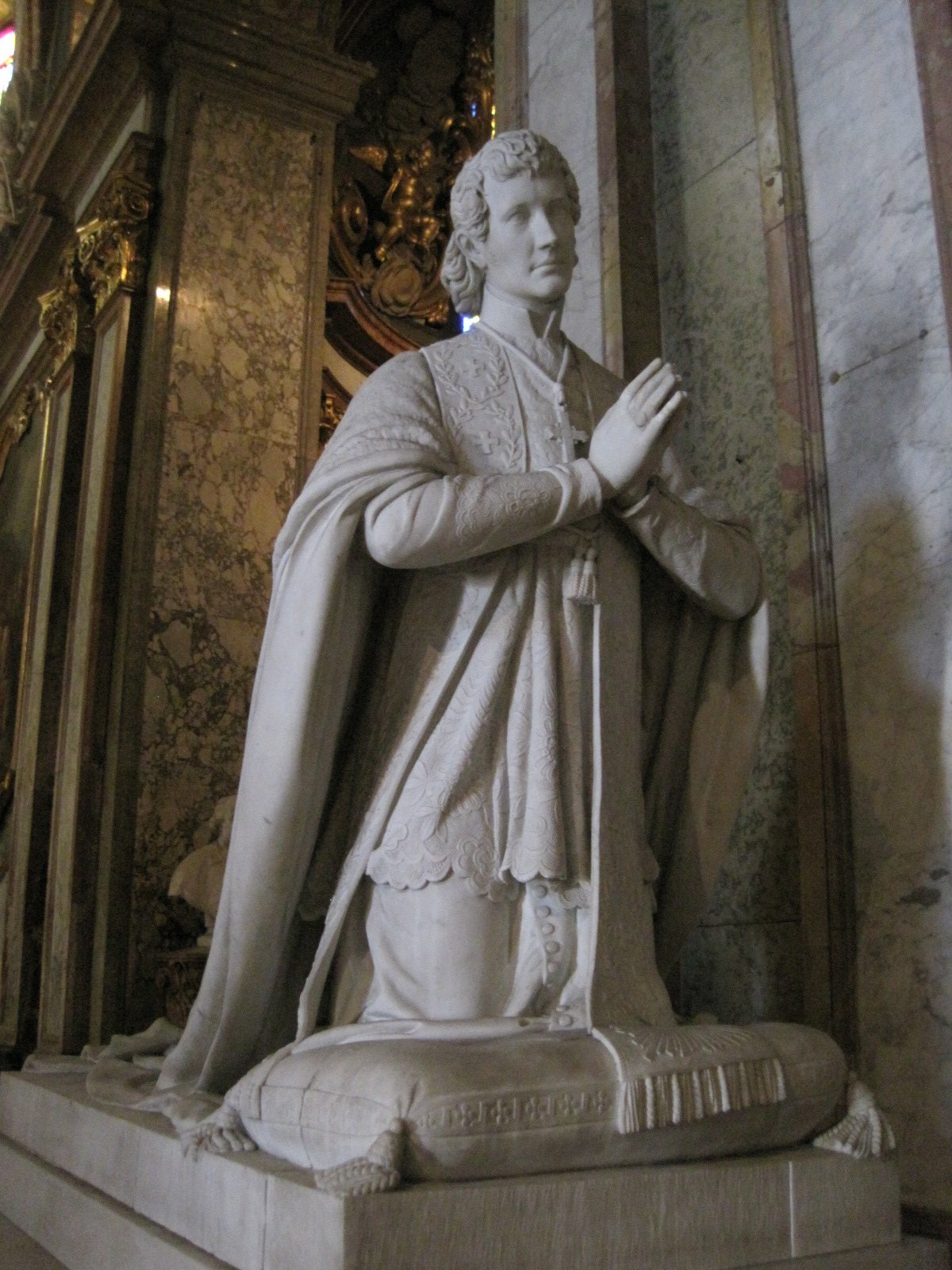
Louis-François de Rohan-Chabot (1788-1833), Duke of Rohan, Archbishop of Auch, then Besançon, Cardinal

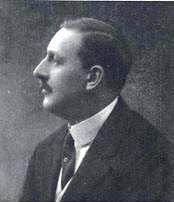
Josselin de Rohan-Chabot (1879-1916), Duke of Rohan, deputy of Morbihan

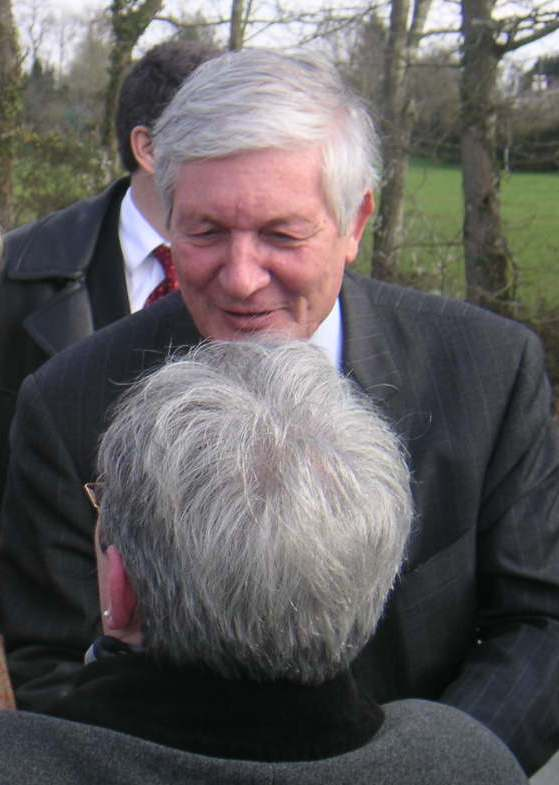
Josselin de Rohan-Chabot (b. 1938), Duke of Rohan, senator of Morbihan, President of the Regional Council of Brittany

== See also ==
- House of Rohan
- Rohan, Morbihan

== Sources ==
- Gustave Chaix d'Est-Ange, Dictionnaire des familles françaises anciennes ou notables à la fin du XIXème siècle, 1910, vol. IX, p. 174-179 read online.
- Régis Valette, Catalogue de la noblesse française au XXIème siècle, Robert Laffont, 2007.
- Georges Martin, Histoire et génealogie des maisons de Chabot et de Rohan-Chabot, 1996, Lyon.
