= Louis, Duke of Rohan =

Louis
- Duke of Rohan
- Born: 3 November 1652; Hôtel de la rue du Temple, Paris, France
- Died: 17 August 1727 (aged 74); Paris, France
- Burial: Château de Blain, France
- Spouse: Marie Élisabeth de Bec-Crespin de Grimaldi
- Issue Detail: Louis Bretagne, Duke of Rohan; Marie Marguerite, Countess of Schleiden; Anne Henriette Charlotte, Princess of Berghes; Guy Auguste, Count of Maillé-Seizploue
Names
- Louis de Rohan-Chabot
- House: Rohan
- Father: Henri Chabot
- Mother: Marguerite de Rohan

Louis de Rohan-Chabot (English: /ˈroʊən ʃæˈboʊ/ ROH-ən-sha-BOH, French: [lwi də ʁɔɑ̃ ʃabo]; 3 November 1652 – 17 August 1727) was a member of the House of Rohan-Chabot and Duke of Rohan. He married an heiress and acted as Louis XIV's representative in Brittany. He was styled as the Prince of Léon prior to becoming Duke of Rohan. His direct descendant is today's Josselin de Rohan (born 5 June 1938), a member of the Senate of France, representing the Morbihan department.

== Early life and family ==
Born at the Hôtel de la rue du Temple in Paris, to Henri Chabot and his wife Marguerite de Rohan, Louis was the fifth of six children and their only surviving son. His parents' marriage had caused a scandal; his mother Marguerite was a Foreign Princess as a member of the House of Rohan, and her wedding plans had caused Louis XIV to issue a decree that she was permitted to marry Henri and still hold her high rank at court.

Henri's family were allowed to bear the name of Rohan-Chabot, the hyphenation of his maternal and paternal family names.

Around 1700, Louis was at Court. The Guéméné branch of the House of Rohan wanted him to abandon the name and coat-of-arms of his mother's family. However, King Louis XIV confirmed his rights to the name, title and coat-of-arms, to which his father had been entitled since 19 September 1646, part of his parents' marriage contract.

Louis was close to his older sister Anne de Rohan-Chabot, future Princess of Soubise and mistress of Louis XIV. His youngest sister, Jeanne Pelagie, married the Prince of Epinoy, the paternal grandfather of Louis de Melun and Anne Julie de Melun, a future Princess of Soubise. Louis' nephews included Hercule Mériadec, Duke of Rohan-Rohan and the Cardinal de Soubise. Louis' godparents were the infant Louis XIV and the infant's mother Anne of Austria, Queen Regent.

== Career ==
=== Military service ===
Louis campaigned in Flanders in 1667, and in the same year he became head of the nobility in Brittany and was the king's representative there. He was also involved in sieges at Tournai, Douai, and Lille.

== Personal life ==
He married Marie Élisabeth de Bec-Crespin de Grimaldi, marquise de Vardes, a granddaughter of Jacqueline de Bueil, mistress of King Henri IV. Louis and Marie Élisabeth were married on 18 July 1678 at the Château de Saint-Cloud, residence of Philippe de France, Monsieur (brother of Louis XIV) and his wife Elizabeth Charlotte of the Palatinate, Madame.

His wife brought a considerable dowry. She was the sole heiress of her father, François René du Bec-Crespin, marquis de Vardes, comte de Moret, and Catherine Nicolaï, marquise de Goussainville. Louis and Jacqueline had 11 children, of which two sons and a daughter would go on to have progeny. Their children were:

- Louis Bretagne Alain de Rohan-Chabot, Duke Rohan, Prince of Léon (1679–1738), who married Françoise de Roquelaure (daughter of Antoine Gaston de Roquelaure) and had issue.
- Marie Marguerite Françoise de Rohan-Chabot, Mademoiselle de Rohan (1680–1706), who married Louis Pierre Engelbert de La Marck, Count of Schleiden.
- Anne Henriette Charlotte de Rohan-Chabot, Mademoiselle de Léon (1682–1751), who married Alphonse Dominique François de Berghes, 2nd Prince of Grimberghen, no issue.
- Guy Auguste de Rohan-Chabot, Count of Maillé-Seizploue (1683–1760), who married Yvonne Sylvie du Breil de Rays and had issue; married again to Mary Apolonia Scolastica Stafford-Howard, had no issue.
- Charlotte de Rohan-Chabot, Mademoiselle de Porhoëtt (c. 1684–1710), who never married.
- Françoise Gabrielle de Rohan-Chabot (b. 1685), who never married.
- Charles Annibal de Rohan-Chabot, Count of Jarnac (1687–1762), who married Henriette Charlotte Chabot, suo jure Countess of Jarnac, no issue.
- Julie Victoire de Rohan-Chabot (1688–1730), who never married.
- Constance Eléonore de Rohan-Chabot (1691–1733), who never married.
- Marie Armande de Rohan-Chabot (1692–1742), who never married.
- Marie Louise de Rohan-Chabot (b. 1697), who never married.

Louis died in Paris on 17 August 1727, aged 74. He was buried at the Château de Blain. Marie Élisabeth survived him until 27 March 1743, when she, too, died in Paris, aged 81.

== Ancestry ==
Ancestors of Louis, Duke of Rohan

8. Léonor Chabot
4. Charles Chabot
9. Marguerite de Durfort
2. Henri Chabot, Duke of Rohan
10. Michel de Lur-Saluces
5. Henriette de Lur-Saluces
11. Marie Raguier d'Esternay
1. Louis de Rohan-Chabot
12. René de Rohan, Viscount of Rohan
6. Henri de Rohan, Duke of Rohan
13. Catherine de Parthenay-L'Archeveque
3. Marguerite de Rohan, Duchess of Rohan, Princess of Léon
14. Maximilien de Béthune, Duke of Sully
7. Marguerite de Béthune, Mademoiselle de Sully
15. Rachel de Cochefilet
