= List of senators of Morbihan =

Location of Morbihan in France

Following is a list of senators of Morbihan, people who have represented the department of Morbihan in the Senate of France.

== Third Republic ==
Senators for Morbihan under the French Third Republic were:

- Vincent Audren de Kerdrel (1876–1899)
- Hippolythe Thome de Keridec (1876–1878)
- Charles de La Monneraye (1879–1894)
- Gustave de Lamarzelle (1894–1924)
- Armand Fresneau (1888–1900)
- Charles Riou (1900–1920)
- Geoffroy de Goulaine (1901–1913)
- Roger Audren de Kerdrel (1909–1920)
- Jean Guilloteaux (1913–1924)
- Alfred Brard (1920–1940)
- Louis Guillois (1920–1932)
- Ernest Lamy (1924–1927)
- Alphonse Rio (1924–1940)
- Roger Grand (1927–1933)
- Edmond Filhol de Camas (1933–1940)
- Paul Maulion (1935–1940)

== Fourth Republic ==
Senators for Morbihan under the French Fourth Republic were:

| Period | Name | Group |
|---|---|---|
| 1946–1948 | René Bellon | Communist, Republican, Citizen and Ecologist group (COM) |
| 1946–1948 | Auguste Le Goff | Popular Republican Movement (MRP) |
| 1946–1948 | Valentin Vignard | Popular Republican Movement (MRP) |
| 1948–1952 | Jean de Gouyon | Independent Republicans (RI) |
| 1948–1952 | Auguste Le Goff (1948–1949) | Popular Republican Movement (MRP) |
| 1948–1952 | Joseph Le Digabel (1949–1952) | Centre Républicain d'Action Rurale et Sociale |
| 1948–1952 | Louis Le Leannec | Independent Republicans (RI) |
| 1952–1958 | Joseph Le Digabel | Centre Républicain d'Action Rurale et Sociale |
| 1952–1958 | Louis Le Leannec | Independent Republicans (RI) |
| 1952–1958 | Joseph Yvon | Independent Republicans (RI) |
| 1958–1959 | Victor Golvan | National Centre of Social Republicans (CNRS) |
| 1958–1959 | Louis Le Leannec | Independent Republicans (RI) |
| 1958–1959 | Joseph Yvon | Independent Republicans (RI) |

== Fifth Republic ==
Senators for Morbihan under the French Fifth Republic were:

| Period | Name | Group |
|---|---|---|
| 1959-1965 | Marcel Lambert | Independent Republicans (RI) |
| 1959-1965 | Victor Golvan | Union for the New Republic (UNR) |
| 1959-1965 | Joseph Yvon | Centrist Union group (UCDP) |
| 1965-1974 | Marcel Lambert | Independent Republicans (RI) |
| 1965-1974 | Victor Golvan | Union for the New Republic (UNR) |
| 1965-1974 | Joseph Yvon | Centrist Union group (UCDP) |
| 1974-1983 | Raymond Marcellin (1974-1981) | Independent Republicans (RI) |
| 1974-1983 | Henri Le Breton (1981-1983) | Centrist Union group (UC-UDF) |
| 1974-1983 | Louis Le Montagner | Centrist Union group (UCDP) |
| 1974-1983 | Joseph Yvon | Centrist Union group (UCDP) |
| 1983-1992 | Christian Bonnet | Centrist Union group (UC-UDF) |
| 1983-1992 | Henri Le Breton | Centrist Union group (UC-UDF) |
| 1983-1992 | Josselin de Rohan | Rally for the Republic (RPR) |
| 1992-2001 | Christian Bonnet | Centrist Union group (UC-UDF) |
| 1992-2001 | Henri Le Breton | Centrist Union group (UC-UDF) |
| 1992-2001 | Josselin de Rohan | Rally for the Republic (RPR) |
| 2001-2011 | Odette Herviaux | Socialist Party (PS) |
| 2001-2011 | Joseph Kergueris | Centrist Union group (UC) |
| 2001-2011 | Josselin de Rohan | Union for a Popular Movement (UMP) |
| 2011-2017 | Odette Herviaux | Socialist Party (PS) |
| 2011-2017 | Joël Labbé | Europe Ecology – The Greens (EELV) |
| 2011-2017 | Michel Le Scouarnec | French Communist Party (PCF) |
| 2017- | Joël Labbé | Europe Ecology – The Greens (EELV) |
| 2017- | Muriel Jourda | The Republicans (LR) |
| 2017- | Jacques Le Nay | Union of Democrats and Independents (UDI) |

== Sources ==
- Liste des anciens sénateurs de la IIIème République par circonscription (in French), Sénat de France
- Liste des anciens sénateurs de la IVème République par circonscription (in French), Sénat de France
- Liste des anciens sénateurs de la Vème République par circonscription (in French), Sénat de France
- Liste par département - Morbihan (in French), Sénat de France
