= Odette Herviaux =

French politician

Member of the Senate for Morbihan
- In office 1 October 2001 – 1 October 2017
- Parliamentary group: SOC

Regional Councillor of Brittany
- In office 15 March 1998 – 14 March 2010

Mayor of La Croix-Helléan
- In office 18 June 1995 – 9 March 2008
- Preceded by: Eugène Guillet
- Succeeded by: Joël Guegan

Personal details
- Born: 1 January 1948 (age 78) Brest, France
- Party: PS

Odette Herviaux (born 6 January 1948) is a French political personality. Member of the Socialist Party, she was the Mayor of La Croix-Helléan (Morbihan department) and Regional Councillor of Brittany. She served as a Senator from Morbihan between 2001 and 2017.
