= Château de Blain =

Castle in Pays de la Loire, France

Coordinates: 47°28′00″N 1°45′53″W

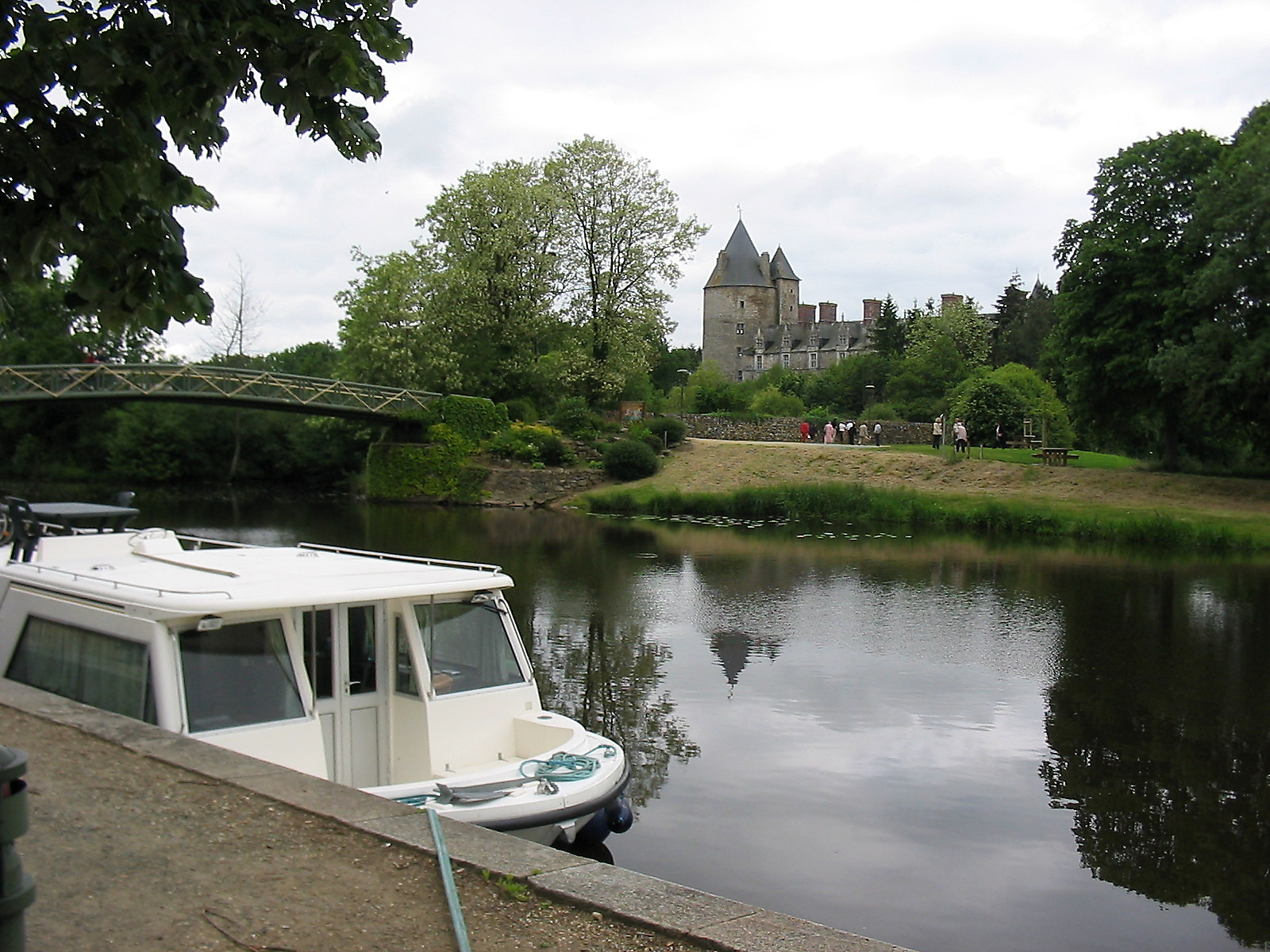
The Château de Blain, as seen from across the Canal de Nantes à Brest

The Château de Blain or Château de la Groulais, is a mediaeval castle constructed in the 13th century and heavily remodelled in the 16th, located in the commune of Blain in the Loire-Atlantique département of France. It formed part of the frontier defences of Brittany along with the towns and castles of Vitré, Fougères, Châteaubriant, Ancenis and Clisson.

== Geography ==
The castle stands on the side of the Nantes-Brest canal. It has 12 towers and covers an area of 4 hectares.

== History ==
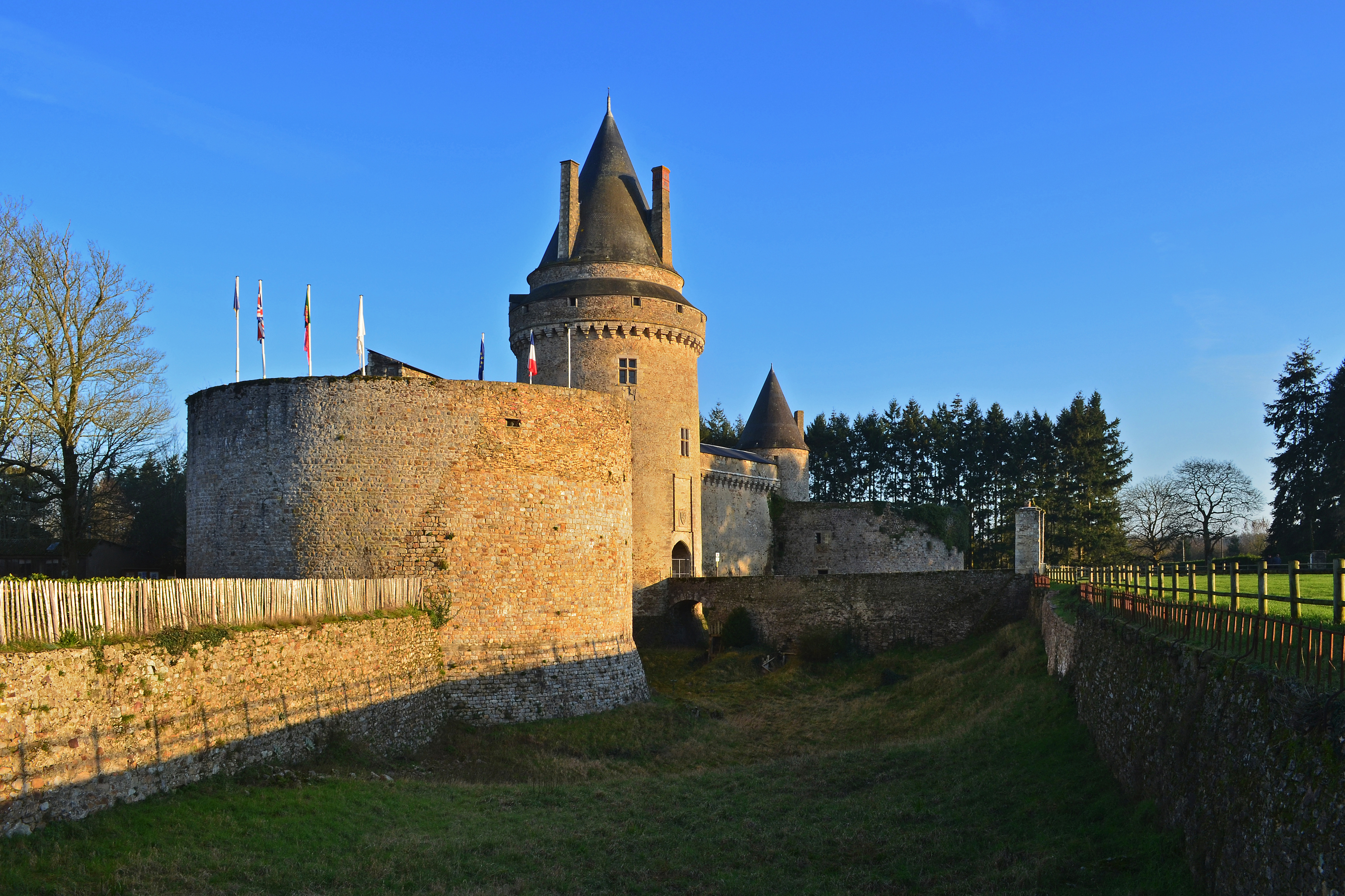
Tour du Sud-Ouest, Tour du Pont-Levis and Tour des prisons

The first castle was constructed on the orders of Alan IV, Duke of Brittany, around 1108. The fortress passed by marriage to the Clisson family in 1225. Following Olivier I of Clisson's revolt against the Duke, the castle was razed in 1260.

Olivier I's son, Olivier II obtained permission from the Duke to rebuild the castle. The Clissons progressively enlarged the castle during the 14th century.

In 1407, the castle became the property of the House of Rohan. Louis, Duke of Rohan, is buried here.

During the French Wars of Religion, the castle was besieged and set on fire in 1591 during fighting between the Duke of Mercœur and Jean de Montauban, the knight De Goust. It was restored by Catherine de Parthenay, who installed herself there with her children. In 1628, Henri II, Duke of Rohan, having become the leader of the Protestant princes, Cardinal Richelieu ordered that the castle be dismantled resulting in the loss of its military role.

The castle suffered further serious damage during the French Revolution. It was pillaged and burnt, along with the Rohan family archives. It served as a barracks and later as a prison.

It passed through the hands of several proprietors, including Marie Bonaparte in 1918. These owners remodelled the north wing (known as the Logis du Roy) and the Mill Tower (la tour du moulin).

== Architecture ==
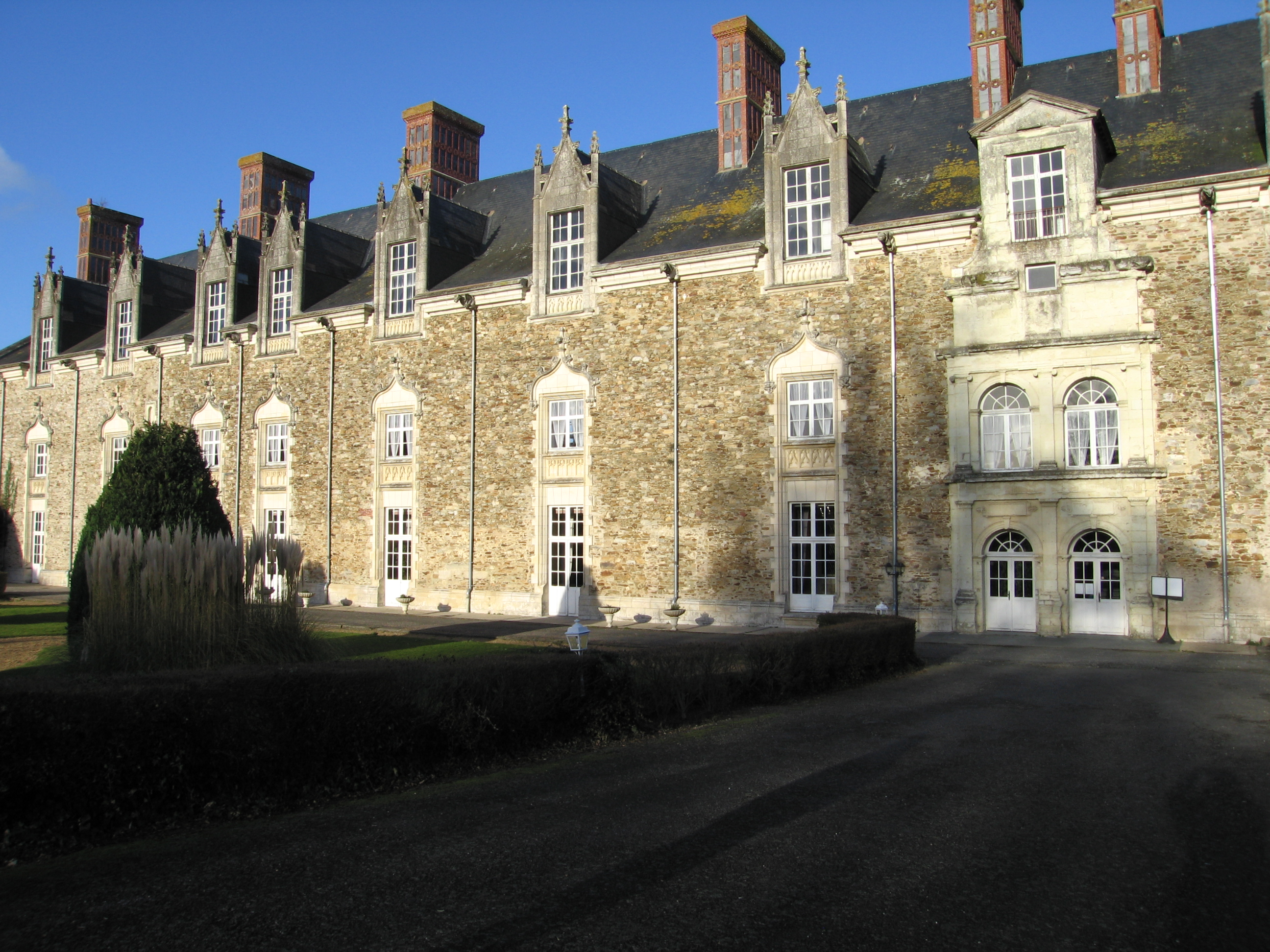
North wing of Château de Blain, the logis du Roi, remodelled in the 19th century

The South West Tower and the Drawbridge Tower, along with the buildings on either side, form the entrance to the castle. Along with the Constable's Tower (tour du Connétable), the two towers in the south east and the monumental entrance on the south façade of the logis du Roi, they date from before the 17th century. Together with the remains of the towers and the fortifications linking them, they have been classified as a monument historique by the French Ministry of Culture.

The north wing of the logis du Roi was remodelled in the 19th century.

== Today ==
The castle houses a fresco centre and an ancient printshop. It has been listed since 1977 as a monument historique by the French Ministry of Culture.

== Gallery ==
Gargoyles on the logis du Roy

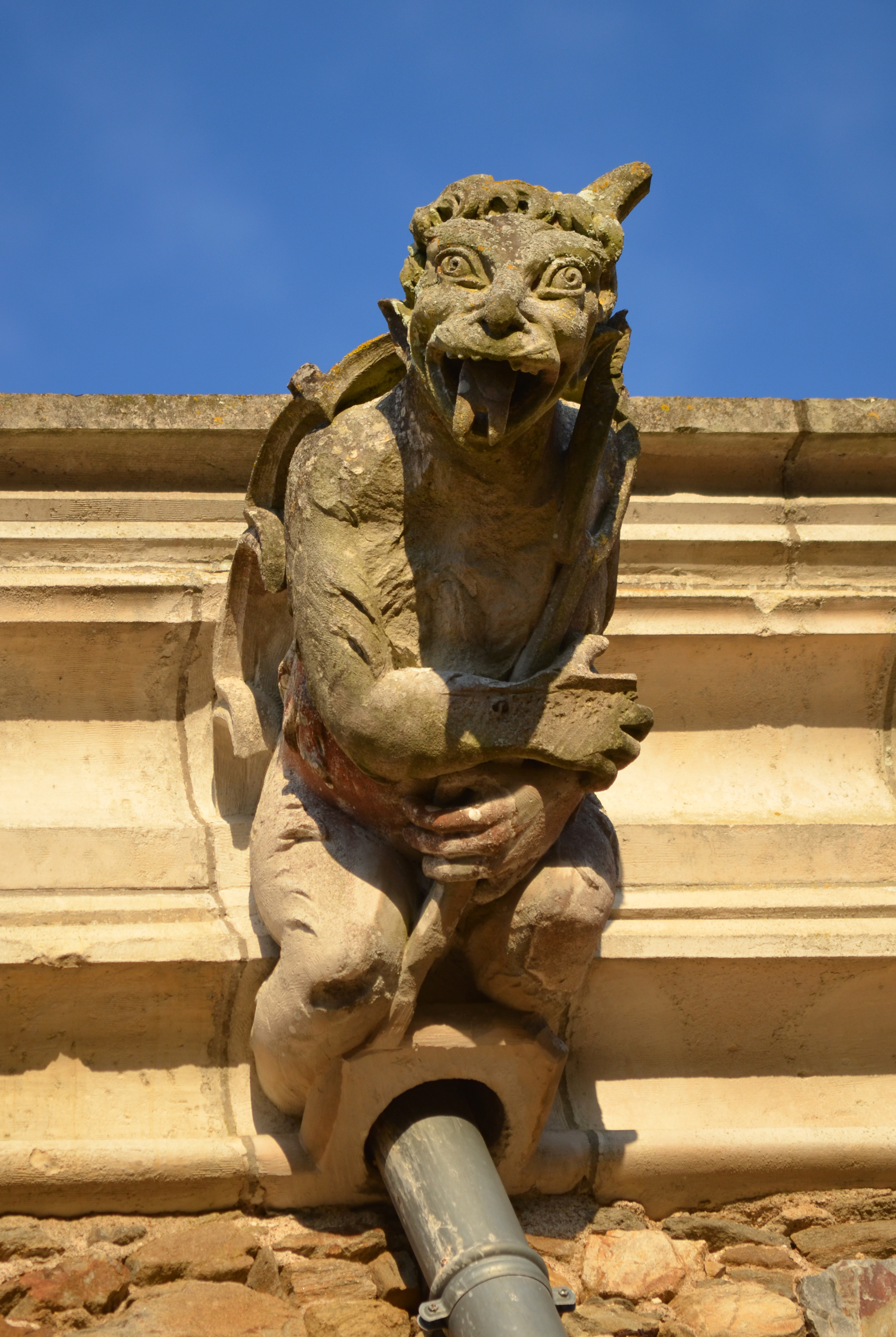

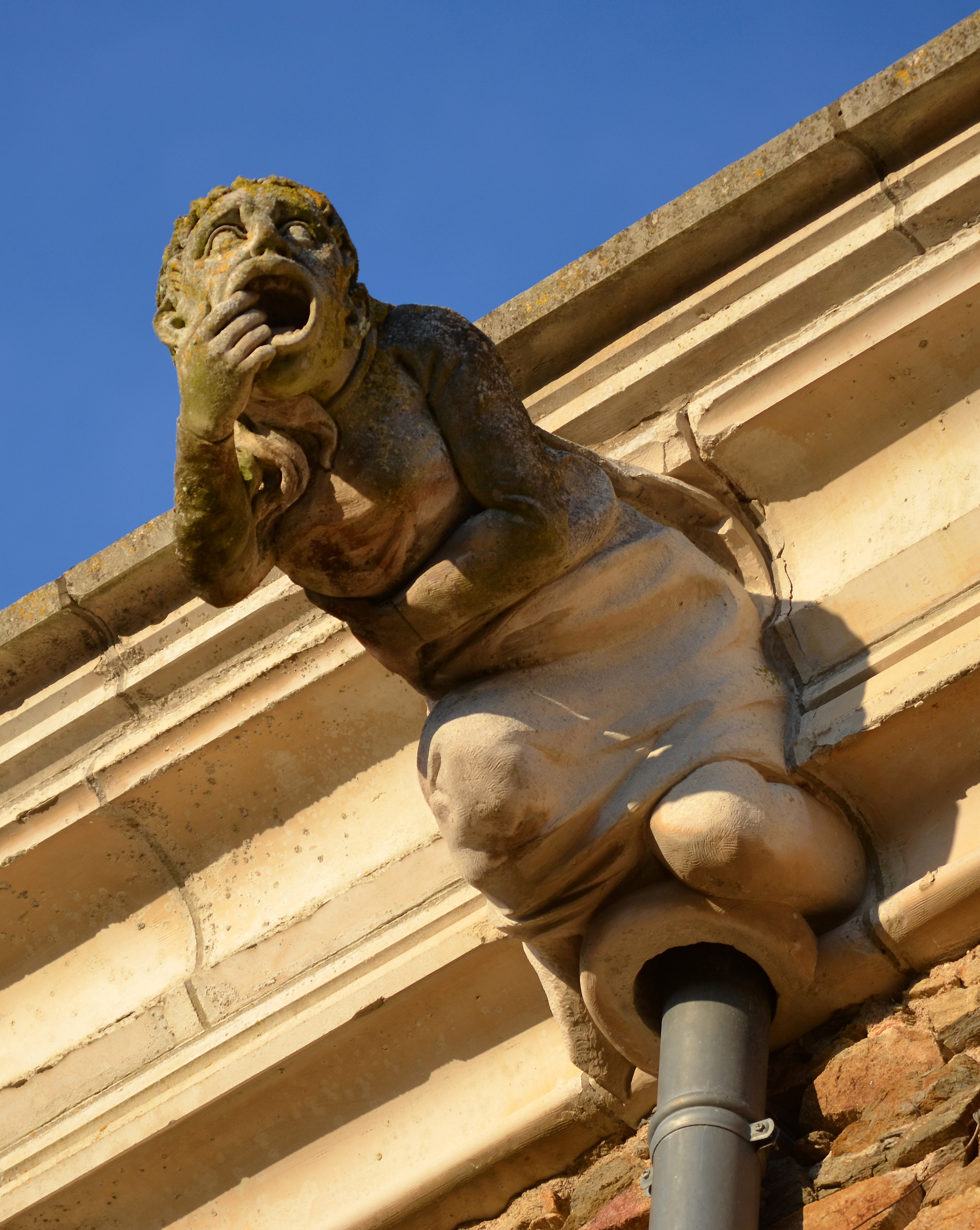

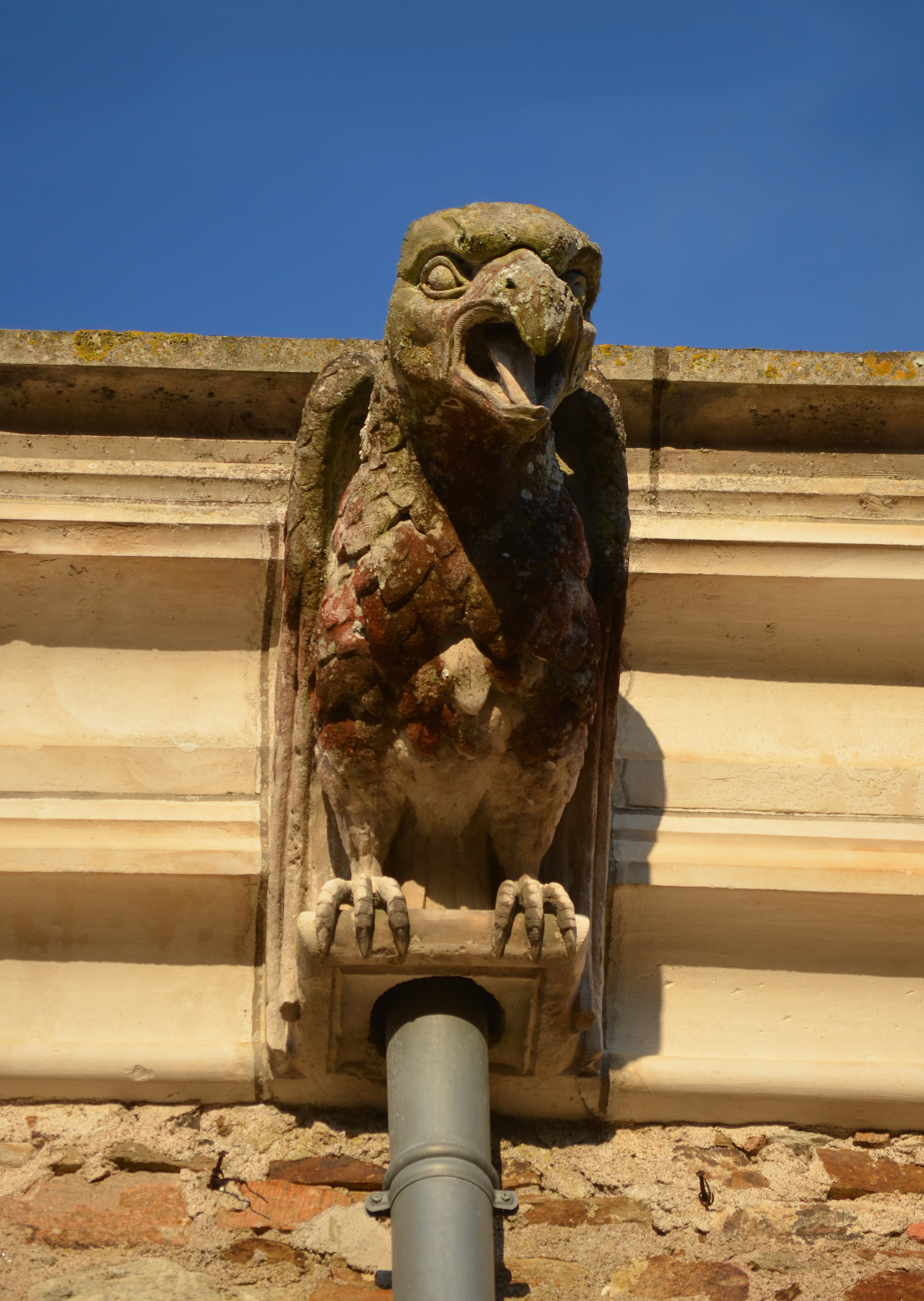

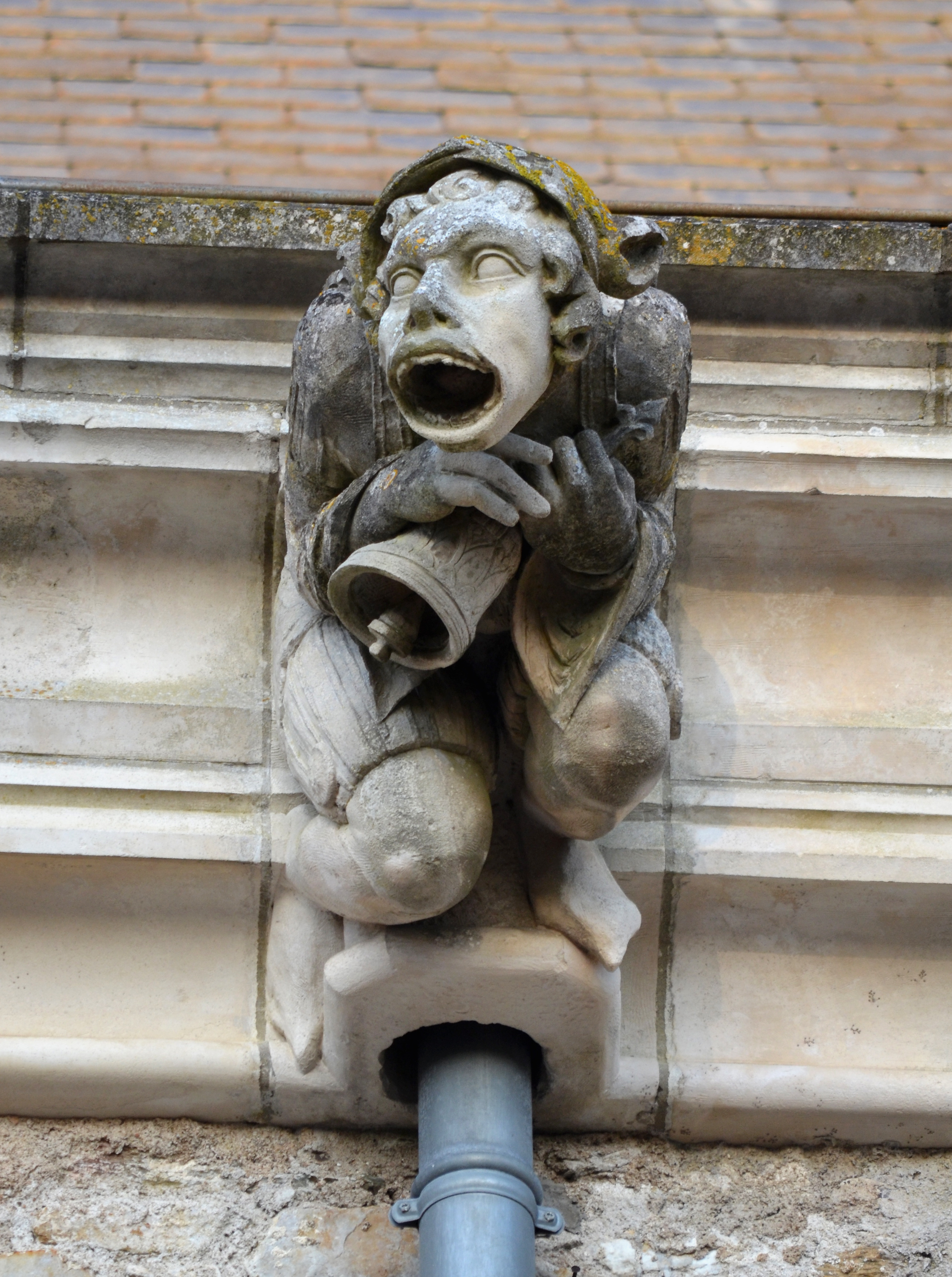

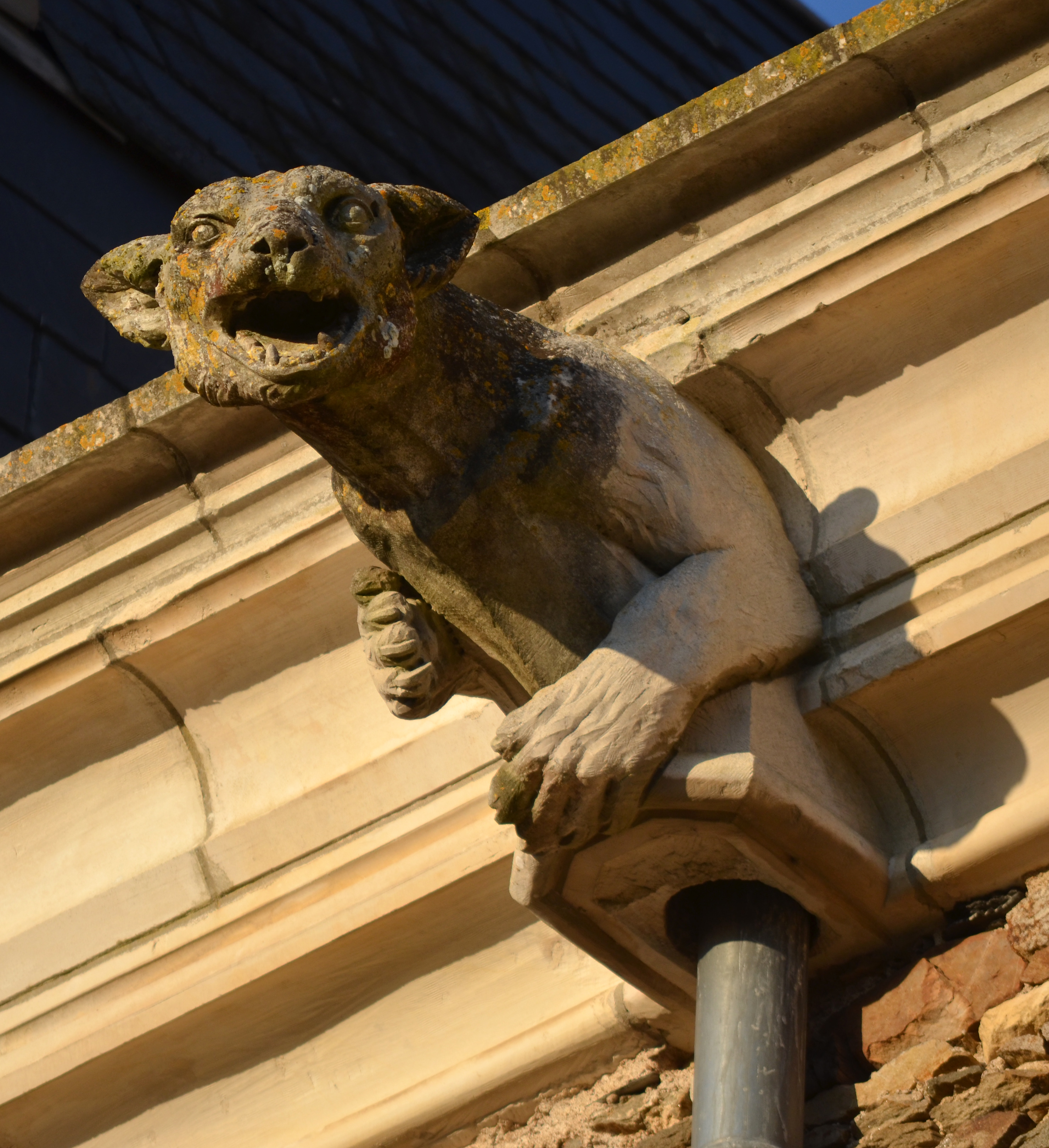

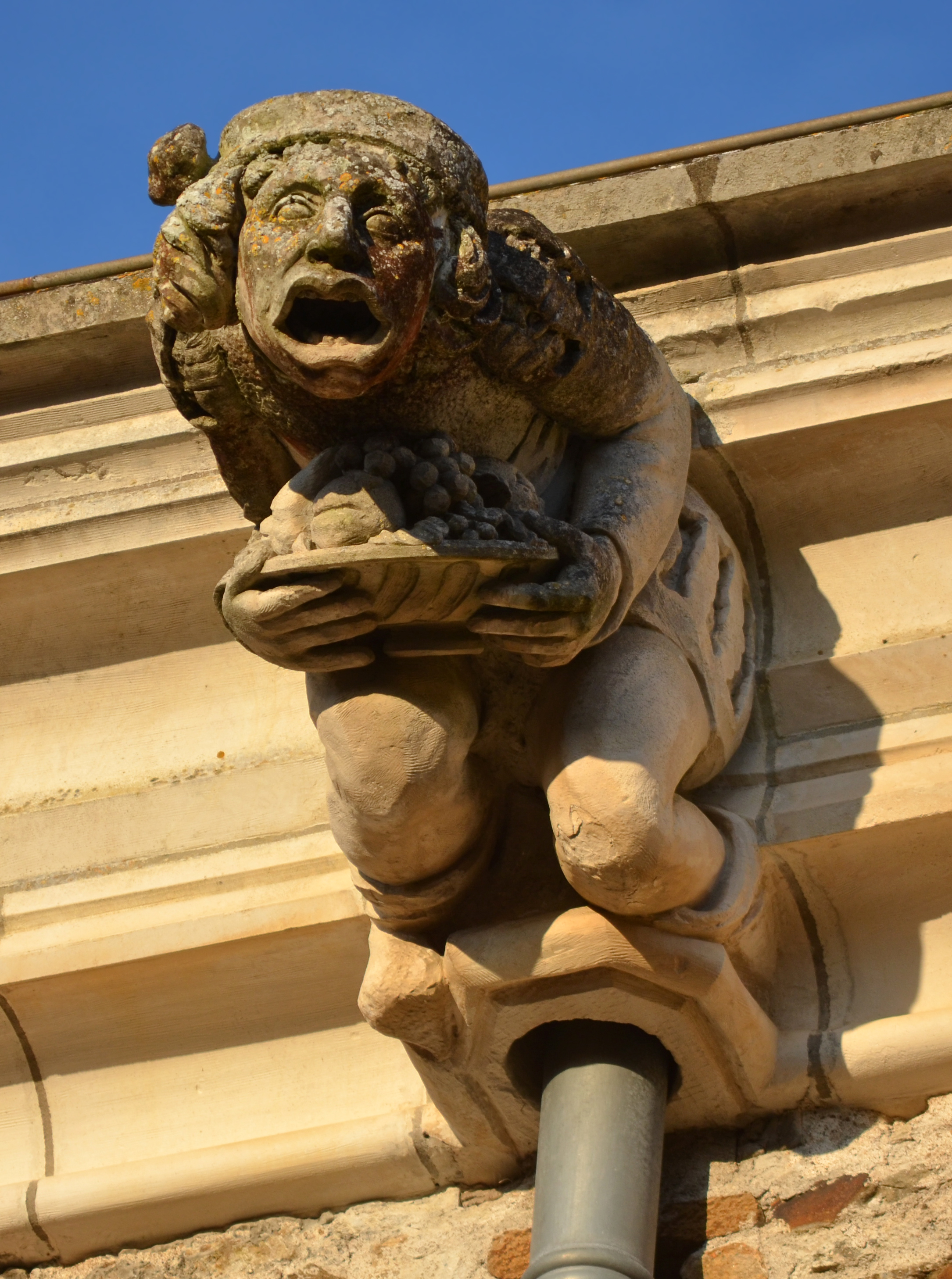

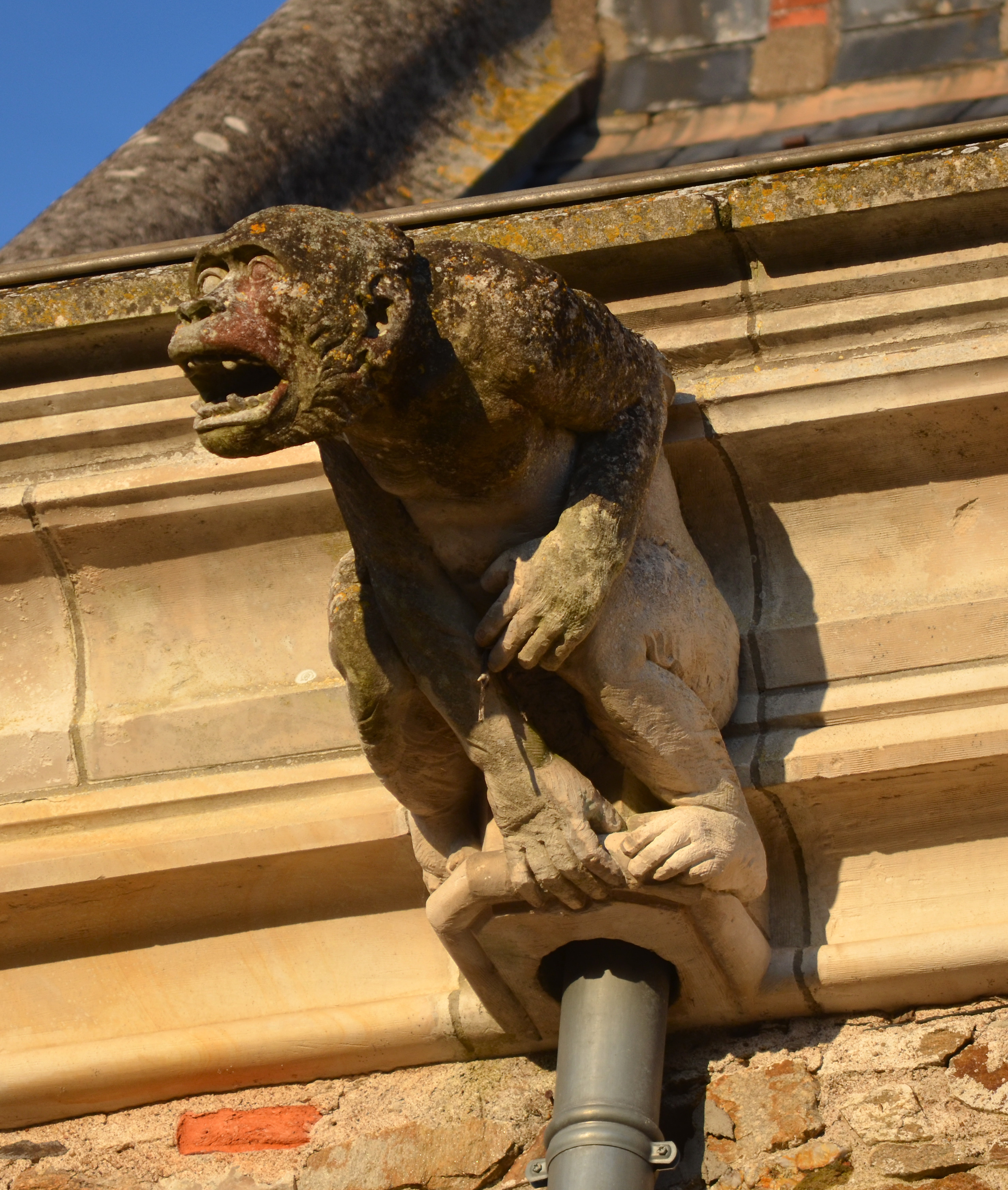

== See also ==
- List of castles in France

Media related to Château de Blain at Wikimedia Commons

== References and sources ==
- Information panel at the castle
