= Marguerite, Duchess of Rohan =

Marguerite
- Duchess of Rohan; Princess of Léon
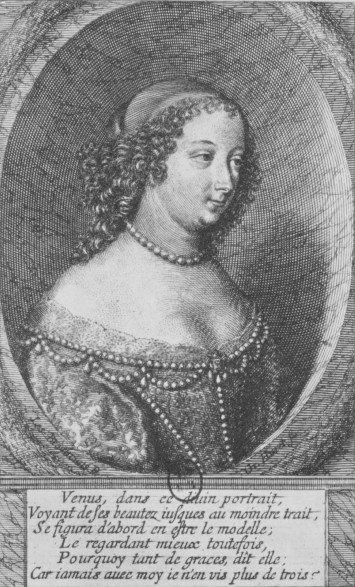
- Engraving of Madame de Rohan
- Born: 1617
- Died: 9 April 1684 (aged 66–67); Paris, France
- Spouse: Henri Chabot
- Issue Detail: Anne, Princess of Soubise; Louis, Duke of Rohan, Prince of Léon; Jeanne Pelagie, Princess of Epinoy
Names
- Marguerite de Rohan
- House: Rohan
- Father: Henri de Rohan
- Mother: Marguerite de Béthune

Marguerite de Rohan (1617 – 9 April 1684) was a French noblewoman and suo jure Duchess of Rohan. She married Henri de Chabot for love and the couple produced four children. A great heiress, she inherited the duchy (later principality) of Soubise which was given to her daughter Anne.

== Early life and ancestry ==
She was the only child of Henri de Rohan, Duke of Rohan and Marguerite de Béthune, a daughter of Maximilien de Béthune. Her family claimed ancestry from the reigning Dukes of Brittany and at the French court, were allowed the rank of Foreign Princes. This entitled them to the style of Highness and other privileges at court.

== Marriage ==
Appealing to the Queen Regent Anne of Austria, in 1645 Louis XIV issued a certificate that willed Marguerite the right to keep her status, her dignity of a princess, should she marry Henri de Chabot. When the Marquis of Seneterre interrogated her on these matters, she replied: I do not know if I shall be able to decide to marry him, but I do feel that I could not bear it if he married someone else.

Previously, her hand had been asked by Louis de Bourbon, Count of Soissons and cousin of the King Henri IV; she refused. Other candidates included Prince Rupert of the Rhine, the Duke of Nemours, and the Duke of Saxe-Weimar. Eventually, she married Henri in Paris on 6 June 1645. The couple were the parents of six children, four of which would have progeny.

By her marriage, she brought her dowry to her husband as well as all her possessions and titles, with the condition that the children bear the name and coat-of-arms of Rohan only. Later the children decided to call themselves Rohan-Chabot and thereby did not honour the clauses of the marriage-contract.

The marriage of a Rohan to a mere nobleman of no fortune was seen as a mésalliance for the powerful Rohans, one of the oldest families in France. Her husband was created Duke of Rohan in 1648.

Titles she held in her own right were; Duchess of Rohan, Princess of Léon, Duchess of Frontenay, Countess of Porhoët, Marquise of Blain, Dame of Lorges, amongst others.

The ducal peerage of Rohan was re-established for Chabot in 1648. Marguerite, Duchess of Rohan in her own right, as a widow was named guardian of her children by royal letters of 10 June 1655.

She died in Paris on 9 April 1684 at the age of 67.

=== Descendants ===
Marguerite has various descendants throughout Europe; Through her son she is a direct male line ancestress of Josselin de Rohan, member of the Senate of France.

Through her daughter Anne, she is an ancestor of the Dukes of Montbazon, another line of the House of Rohan, as well as the present Prince of Monaco.

== Issue ==
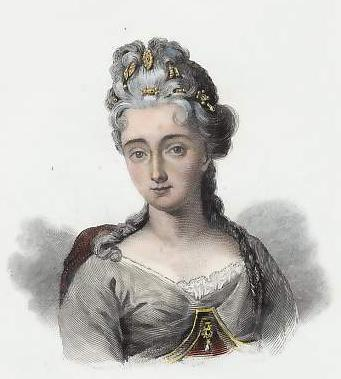
Her youngest daughter, Jeanne Pelagie from a 19th-century engraving

- X de Rohan-Chabot
- Marguerite Gabrielle Charlotte de Rohan-Chabot (d.17 June 1720) married Malo de Coëtquen, Marquis de Coëtquen and had issue;
- Anne Julie de Rohan-Chabot, Princess of Soubise (1648 – 4 February 1709) married François de Rohan, Prince de Soubise and had issue; was mistress of Louis XIV;
- Gilone de Rohan-Chabot (?) died in infancy;
- Louis de Rohan-Chabot, Duke of Rohan, Prince de Léon (3 November 1652 – 17 August 1727) married Marie Elisabeth du Bec-Crespin de Grimaldi and had issue;
- Jeanne Pelagie de Rohan-Chabot (d.18 August 1698) married Alexandre Guillaume de Melun, Prince d'Epinoy and had issue; was grandmother of Anne Julie de Melun, Princesse de Soubise, wife of Jules de Rohan, a grandson of the above Anne.

== Ancestry ==
Ancestors of Marguerite, Duchess of Rohan

8. René, Viscount de Rohan
4. René II, Viscount of Rohan
9. Isabel d'Albret of Navarre
2. Henri, Duke of Rohan
10. Jean de Parthenay-L'Archeveque, seigneur de Soubise
5. Catherine de Parthenay-L'Archeveque
11. Antoinette Bouchard d'Aubeterre
1. Marguerite de Rohan
12. François de Béthune, Baron of Rosny
6. Maximilien de Béthune, Duke of Sully
13. Charlotte Dauvet
3. Marguerite de Béthune
14. Jacques de Cochefilet, Count de Vaucelas
7. Rachel de Cochefilet
15. Marie Arbaleste
