= Samuel Hoffmann =

Painter

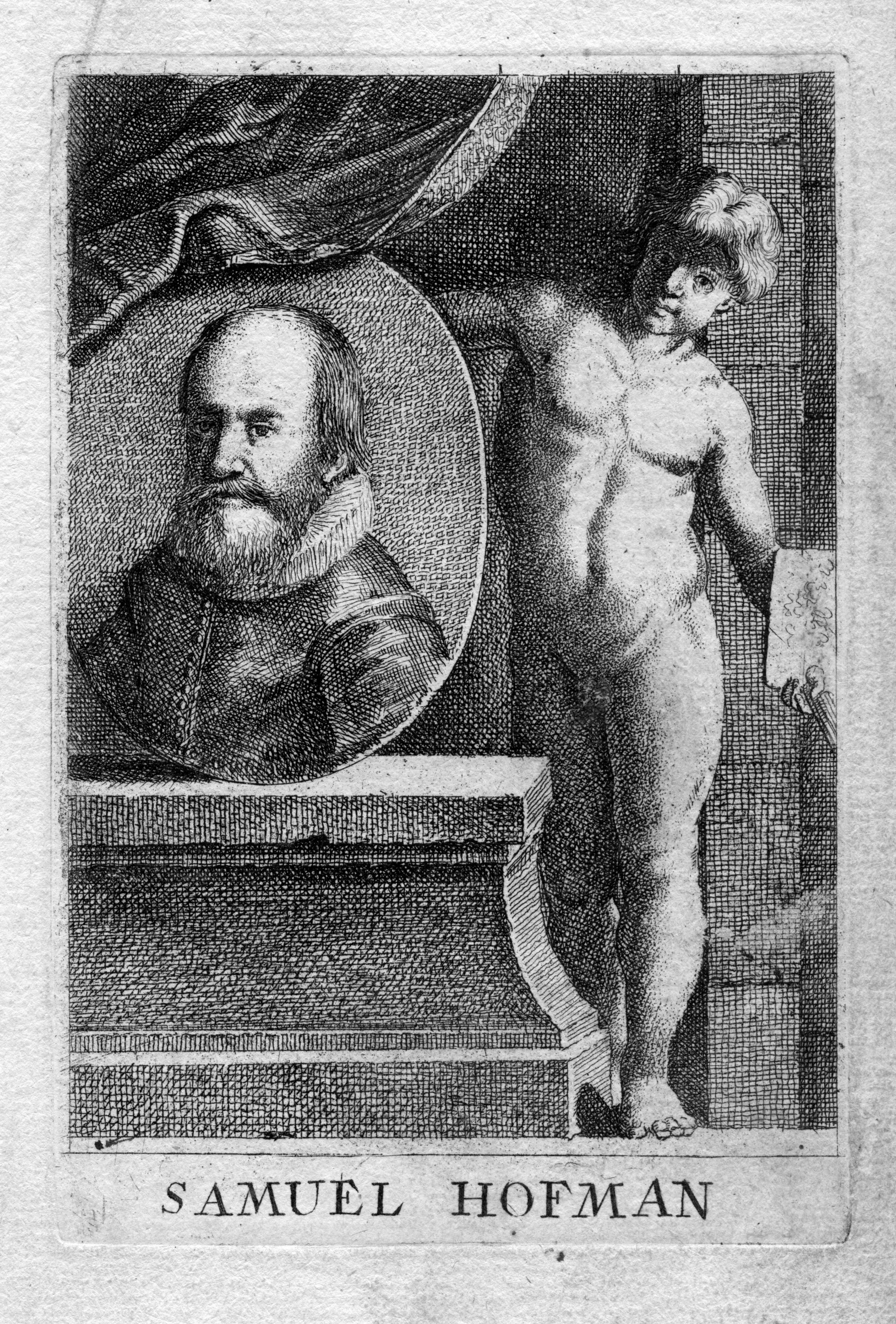

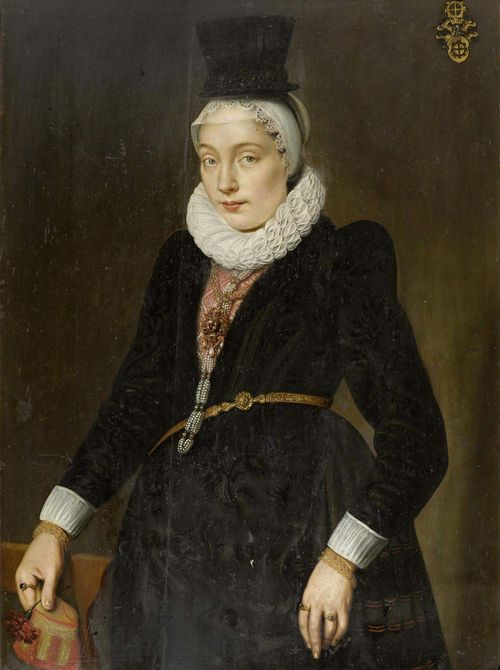
Katharina von Mülinen (1597 -1620), painted by Hoffman in 1617.

Samuel Hoffmann (1591, Zürich – 1648, Frankfurt), was a Baroque painter from Zurich.

== Biography ==
According to Houbraken he travelled to Antwerp to learn painting in the studio of Rubens, and set up a workshop in Amsterdam, where he married in 1628. He then travelled with his wife to his native Zurich where he was successful as a portrait painter. He painted for the Duke of Milan (possibly Victor Amadeus I, Duke of Savoy), and then travelled to Frankfurt where he painted a large piece for the city hall there, but he died of podagra (gout) in 1640. His wife and daughter (who was a painter) returned to Amsterdam.

According to the RKD he was in Amsterdam from 1614-1622.
