= Charles de La Monneraye =

French soldier, historian and politician

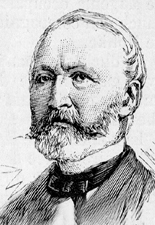
- Born: Charles-Ange; 3 February 1812; Rennes, Ille-et-Vilaine, French Empire
- Died: 12 March 1904 (aged 92); Vannes, Morbihan, France
- Occupations: Historian; politician; soldier
- Relatives: Charles-Marie de La Grandière (grandfather)

Charles-Ange, Count of La Monneraye (3 February 1812 – 12 March 1904) was a 19th-century French soldier, historian and politician. He served as a deputy for Morbihan at the end of the Second Empire and during the early years of the Third Republic, and later as a senator for the same department from 1876.

== Early life ==
Charles-Ange was born 3 February 1812 in Rennes, Ille-et-Vilaine.

He was the son of Admiral Pierre Bruno Jean de La Monneraye and Marie Perrine Jeanne de La Grandière, the daughter of Admiral Charles-Marie de La Grandière. In 1821, he entered the Royal College of Rennes (now the Lycée Émile Zola), and in 1823 he joined the Jesuit College of Sainte-Anne-d'Auray. In September 1828, he successfully gained admission to the Royal Military School of Saint-Cyr and was formally enrolled in November of the same year.

During his second year of military training, Charles de la Monneraye was assigned to Château de Saint-Cloud and later to Rambouillet, where he served in the custody of King Charles X. There, he met the young Henri d'Artois, Duke of Bordeaux (later Count of Chambord), whose claim to the French throne he would later support. His high ranking upon graduation from Saint-Cyr, placing him among the top twenty of his class, enabled him to enter the Staff School on January 1, 1831. He graduated ranked third and began his military career as a topographer in the Army Geography Service. He was promoted to the rank of captain in 1836, at the age of 24.

He resigned from the army in 1839 for family reasons.

== Career ==
Returning to live with his mother at the Château du Clyo, in Caro in Morbihan, Charles-Ange devoted himself to the management of the family agricultural estate and to the study of the dolmens which dot the department and the Breton region. Being an archaeologist, he was one of the first scholars to be fascinated by these megalithic structures, of which we still know very little. He spent several years drawing, listing, measuring and comparing them.

He also embarked on the study of the religious heritage of Brittany from the 11th and 12th centuries, having published his first essay (devoted to this subject) in 1849: “Essay on the history of the religious architecture of Brittany during the duration of the 11th and 12th centuries”. This work was rewarded with a gold medal by the Institut de France.

In 1883, he published another historical essay noticed by his contemporaries: "The ancient and historical geography of the Armorican peninsula". This work, as well as the following scientific works on "the origins of the French population" earned him access to the vice-presidency of the Société Polymathique de Morbihan in 1888, but he refused the offer, citing a lack of time.

== Death ==
He died on 12 March 1904 in Vannes, Morbihan.

== Works ==
- Charles de la Monneraye, Essai sur l'histoire de l'architecture religieuse en Bretagne pendant la durée des xie et xiie siècles, Rennes, Imprimerie de Mme de Caila, 1849
- Charles de la Monneraye, Mémoires sur l'étude des villes et voies romaines en Bretagne, Bulletin archéologique de l'Association bretonne, Rennes, Verdier, 1849, p. 230 à 243
