= Henri Le Breton =

French politician (1928–2022)

Member of the French Senate
- In office 20 September 1981 – 30 September 2001
- Preceded by: Raymond Marcellin
- Constituency: Morbihan

General Councilor of the Canton of Saint-Jean-Brévelay
- In office 1961–1988
- Preceded by: Pierre Gillet
- Succeeded by: Henri-Michel Kersuzan

Mayor of Buléon
- In office 1953–2008
- Succeeded by: Pierre Bouédo

Personal details
- Born: 10 September 1928 Buléon, France
- Died: 18 October 2022 (aged 94)
- Party: UDF

Henri Le Breton (10 September 1928 – 18 October 2022) was a French politician of the Union for French Democracy (UDF).

== Biography ==
A professional animator, he was elected to the Senate in 1981, succeeding Raymond Marcellin who had been elected to the National Assembly. He joined the Centrist Union group and became a member of the Social Affairs Committee. He was re-elected in 1983 and 1992, and did not stand for a fourth term in 2001.

In addition to his mandate in the Senate, Le Breton served as Mayor of Buléon from 1953 to 2008 and was General Councilor of the Canton of Saint-Jean-Brévelay from 1961 to 1988.

Le Breton died on 18 October 2022, at the age of 94.

== Awards ==
- Knight of the Legion of Honour (2006)
- Knight of the Ordre national du Mérite
- Officer of the Order of Agricultural Merit
