= Marguerite de Béthune =

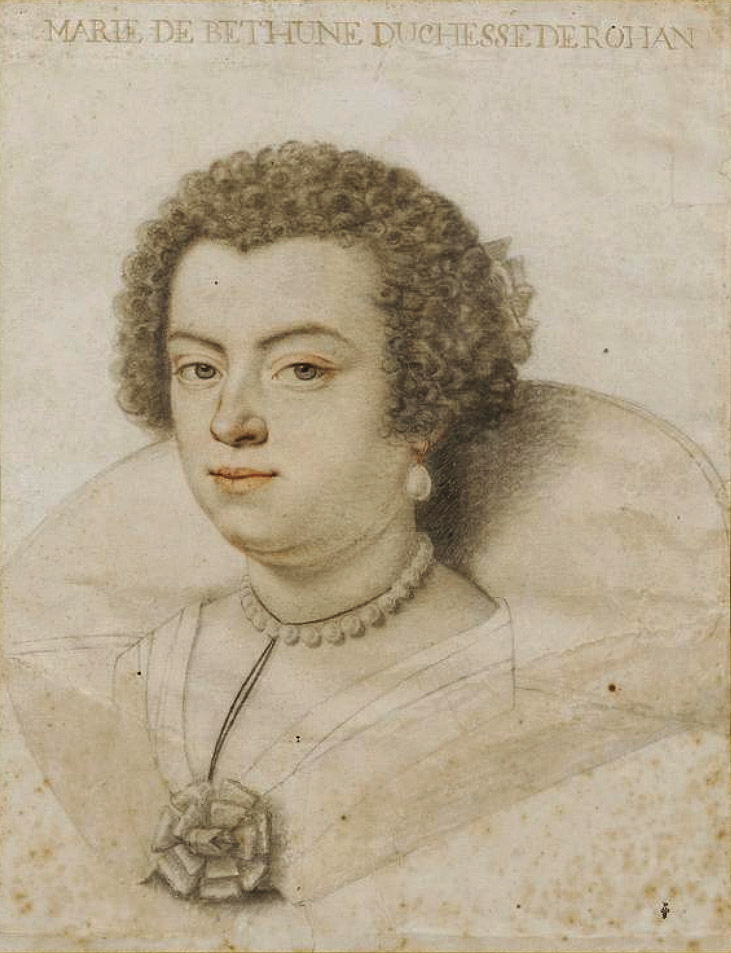
Marguerite de Béthune

Marguerite de Béthune (1595 – 21 October 1660) was the daughter of Maximilien, Duke of Sully and his second wife Rachel de Cochefilet.

== Biography ==
She married Henri de Rohan on 7 February 1603, and was then known as the Duchess consort of Rohan. Their only child Marguerite inherited the duchy and became suo jure Duchess of Rohan.

== Sources ==
- Manifeste pour Madame la duchesse douairiere de Rohan (pour prouver l'existende de son fils Tancrède.- Raisons du renvoy à la Grand' Chambre.- Responses au factum de Madame la Duchesse Douairiere de Rohan). Paris: Chez Edme Pepingué. 1646.
