= Henri, Duke of Rohan =

Breton-French soldier, writer and leader of the Huguenots

Henri II de Rohan
- Duke of Rohan
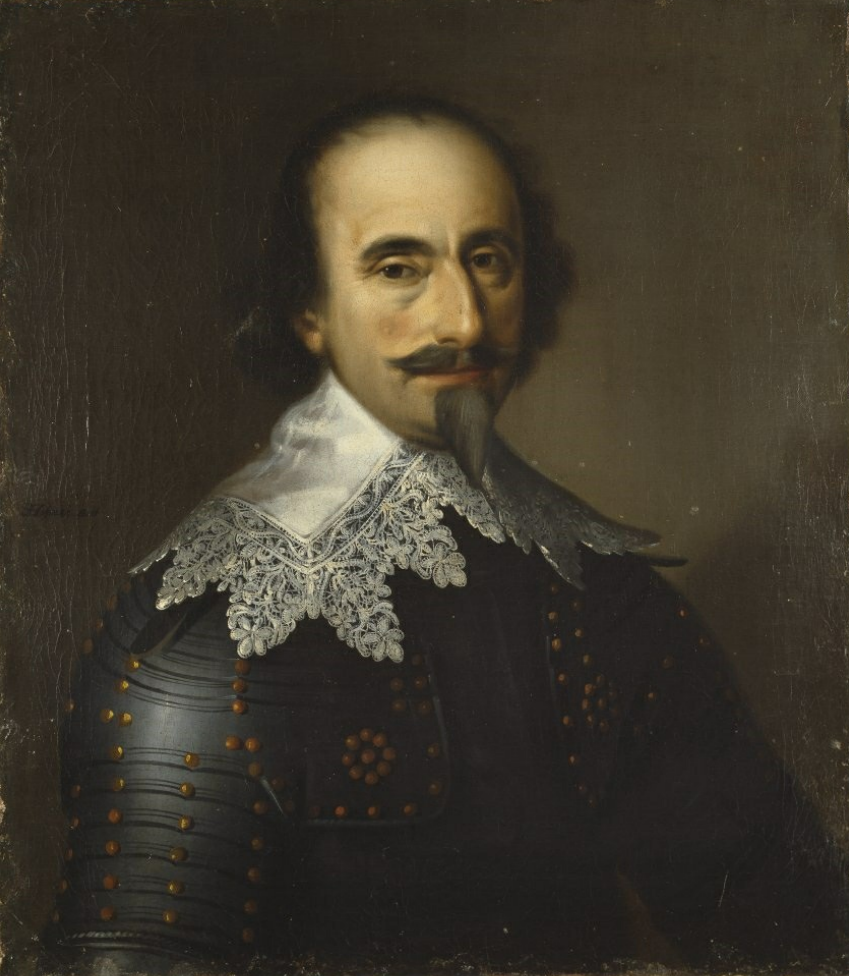
- Portrait by Samuel Hoffmann, c. 1632
- Born: 21 August 1579; Château de Blain, France
- Died: 13 April 1638 (aged 58); Bern, Switzerland
- Buried: St. Pierre Cathedral, Geneva
- Noble family: House of Rohan
- Spouse: Marguerite de Béthune
- Issue: Marguerite de Rohan; Tancrède de Rohan
- Father: René II de Rohan
- Mother: Catherine de Parthenay

Henri II de Rohan (21 August 1579 – 13 April 1638), Duke of Rohan and Prince of Léon, was a Breton-French soldier, writer and leader of the Huguenots.

== Early life ==
Rohan was born at the Château de Blain (now a part of Blain, Loire-Atlantique), in Brittany. His father was René II, Viscount of Rohan (1550–1586), and head of one of the oldest and most distinguished families in France, which was connected with many of the reigning houses of Europe. He was educated by his mother, Catherine de Parthenay, who was a woman of exceptional learning and force of character. Henri II was by birth the second son, but when his elder brother René died young he became the heir of the name. He appeared at court and in the army at the age of sixteen, and was a special favourite with Henry IV, after whom, failing the House of Condé, he might be said to be the natural chief of the French Protestants. Having served till the Peace of Vervins, he travelled for a considerable time over Europe, including England and Scotland, in the first of which countries he received the not unique honour of being called by Elizabeth I her knight.

In Scotland, James VI held a banquet for Rohan in Edinburgh on 16 November 1600. Rohan saw Princess Elizabeth at Linlithgow Palace, Prince Henry at Stirling Castle, and Anne of Denmark at Dunfermline Palace. James VI appointed him a godfather to Charles I. He published an account of his travels as the Voyage Du Duc de Rohan, Faict En l'An 1600, including a passage praising Anne of Denmark and her children.

== Military career ==
On his return to France, Henri was made duke and peer at the age of twenty-four. From 1593 onward, there had been negotiations of marriage between him and the Swedish princess Catherine, but in 1603, however, he married Marguerite de Béthune, the duc de Sully's daughter, and transferred the Rohan family seat from Josselin Castle to Pontivy. He served in high command at the celebrated siege of Jülich in 1610, but soon afterwards he fell into active or passive opposition to the government over the religious disputes. For a time, however, he abstained from actual insurrection, and he endeavoured to keep on terms with Marie de' Medici; he even, despite his dislike of De Luynes, the favourite of Louis XIII, reappeared in the army and fought in Lorraine and Piedmont.

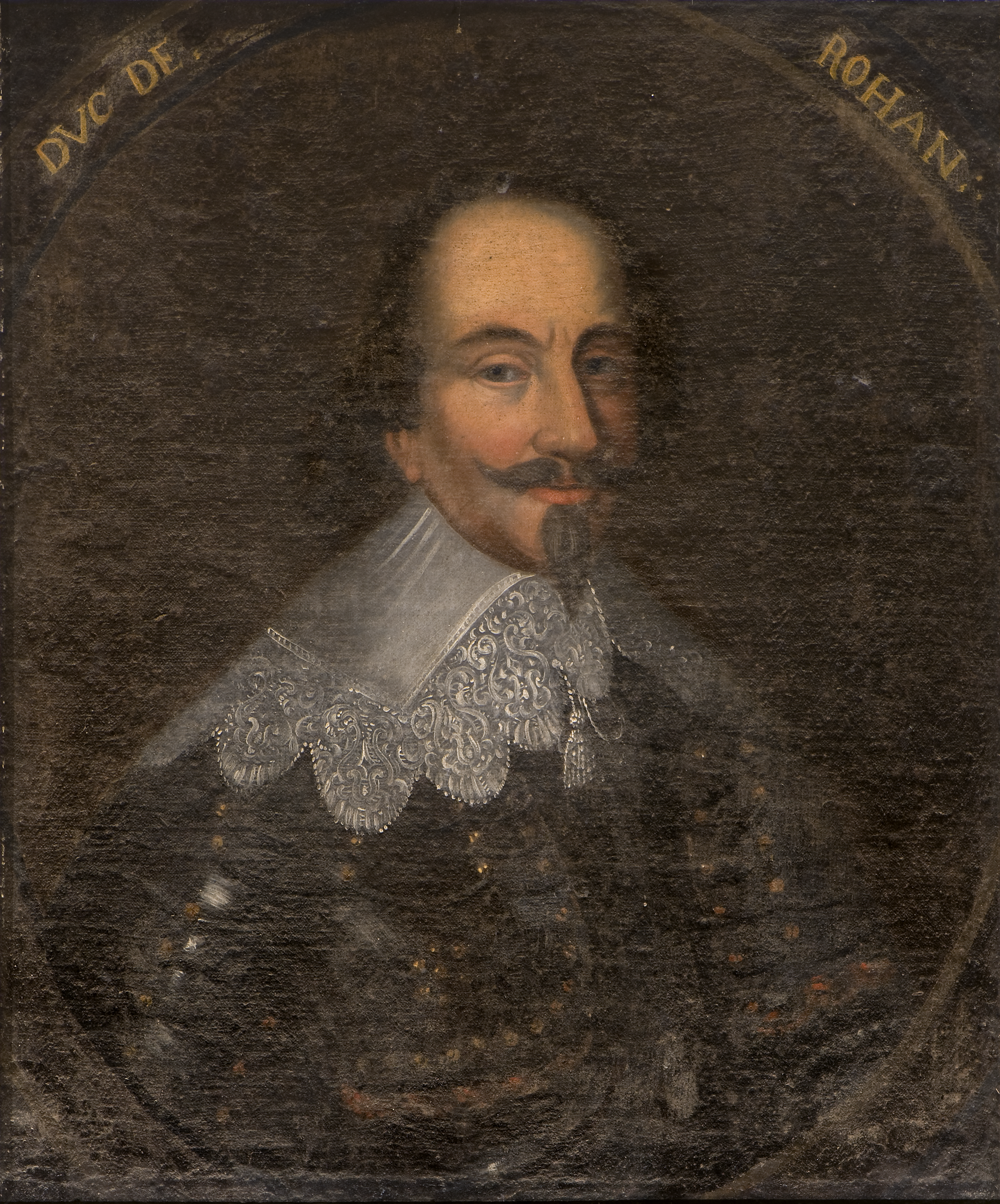
Henri II, Duke of Rohan (1579–1638)

It was not till the decree for the restitution of church property in the south threw the Bearnese and Gascons into open revolt that Henri appeared as a rebel. His authority and military skill were very formidable to the royalists; his constancy and firmness greatly contributed to the happy issue of the war for the Huguenots, and brought about the Treaty of Montpellier (1622). But Henri did not escape the results of the incurable factiousness which showed itself more strongly perhaps among the French Huguenots than among any other of the numerous armed oppositions of the 17th century. He was accused of luke-warmness and treachery, though he did not hesitate to renew the war when the compact of Montpellier was broken. Also during this time in the 1620s, Henri was responsible for considerable damage to the ancient Roman aqueduct bridge Pont du Gard while using it to transport his army across. To make space for his artillery, he had one side of the second row of arches of the ancient structure cut away to only two thirds of their original width, severely weakening the aqueduct bridge.

Again a hollow peace was patched up, but it lasted but a short time, and Henri undertook a third war (1627–1629), the first events of which are recounted in his celebrated Memoirs. This last war (famous for the defence of La Rochelle by Benjamin de Rohan-Soubise, Henri's younger brother) was one of considerable danger for Henri. In spite of all efforts he had in the end to sign a peace, and after this he made his way quickly to Venice. Here he is said to have received from the Porte the offer of the sovereignty of Cyprus. It is more certain that his hosts of Venice wished to make him their general-in-chief, a design not executed owing to the Treaty of Cherasco (1631).

At Venice he wrote his Memoirs; at Padua, Le Parfait Capitaine. However, when France began to play a more conspicuous part in the Thirty Years' War, Henri was again called to serve his lawful sovereign, and entrusted with the war in the Valtellina. The campaign of 1633 was completely successful, but Henri was still considered dangerous to France, and was soon again in retirement. At this time he wrote his Traité du gouvernement des treize cantons.

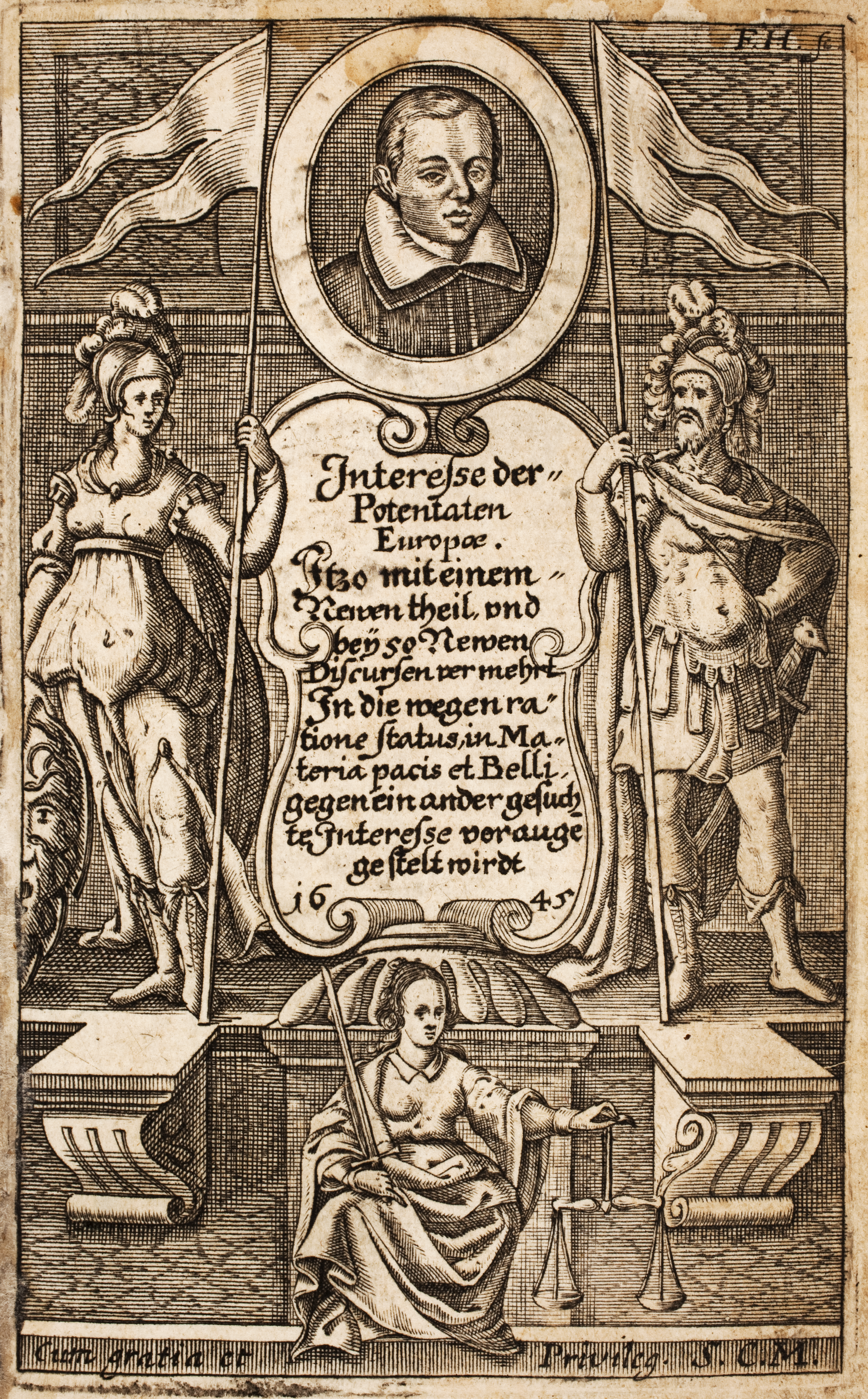
Title page of a German 1645 enhanced translation of Rohan's De l'interest des princes et estats de la chrestienté, 1639.

Henri fought another Valtelline campaign, but without the success of the first, for the motives of France were now held in suspicion. The unfortunate commander retired to Geneva and thence went to the army of Bernhard of Saxe-Weimar. He was wounded and captured at the Battle of Rheinfelden on 28 February 1638. Freed from captivity by Colonel Taupadel, Henri was taken to the abbey of Konigsfeld, canton Bern. There his wounds were treated and he appeared to be recovering, when on 13 April he suffered a cerebral hemorrhage and died. His body was buried at Geneva, and his arms were solemnly handed over to the Venetian government. With his daughter Marguerite the honours of the family of Rohan-Gié passed to the House of Chabot. His grand daughter Anne de Rohan-Chabot married into the Rohans and was princesse de Soubise in her own right.

== Writings ==
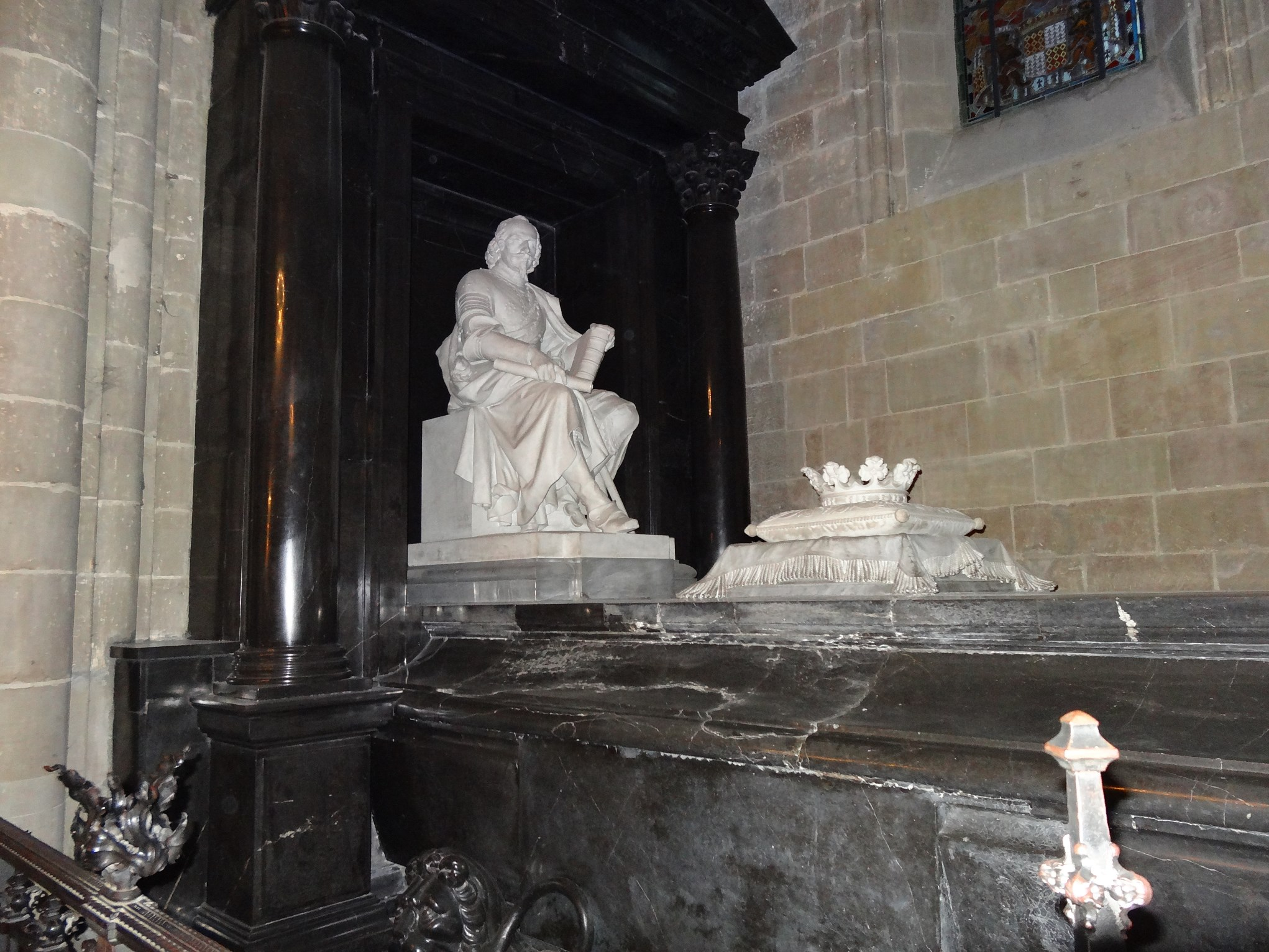
Burial monument in the St. Pierre Cathedral, with statue by Charles François Marie Iguel (1890)

Henri's Mémoires sur les choses qui se sont passées en France, etc., rank amongst the best products of the singular talent for memoir writing which the French noblesse of the 16th and 17th centuries possessed. Alike in style, in clearness of matter and in shrewdness, they deserve very high praise. The first three books, dealing with the civil wars, appeared in 1644; the fourth, containing the narrative of the Valtelline campaigns, not till 1758. Some suspicions were expressed about the genuineness of the latter, but, it would seem, groundlessly. His famous book on the history and art of war, Le Parfait Capitaine, appeared in 1631 and subsequently in 1637 and 1693. (See also Quincy, Art de la guerre, Paris, 1741). It treats of the history and lessons of Caesar's campaigns and their application to modern warfare, and contains appendices dealing with phalangite and legionary methods of fighting and the art of war in general. He also wrote an account of his travels, the book on Switzerland mentioned above, De l'intérêt des princes et États de la chrétienté, etc. The Memoirs may be conveniently found in the collection of Michaud and Poujoulat, vol. 19.

Henri's D’Linterest des Princes et des Estats de la Chrestient was published in France in 1638 (in England in 1941 as A Treatise of the Interest of the Princes and States of Christendome).

See Fauvelet de Foix, Histoire du Duc Henri de Rohan (Paris, 1667); Schybergson, Le Duc de Rohan et la charte du parti protestant en France (Paris, 1880); Buhring, Venedig, Gustaf Adolf, und Rohan (Halle, 1885); Laugel, Henri de Rohan, son rôle politique et militaire (Paris, 1889); Veraguth, Herzog Rohan und seine Mission in Graubilnden (Bern, 1894); and Shadwell, Mountain Warfare.
