= Josselin de Rohan =

French nobleman and politician (born 1938)

Josselin de Rohan Duke of Rohan
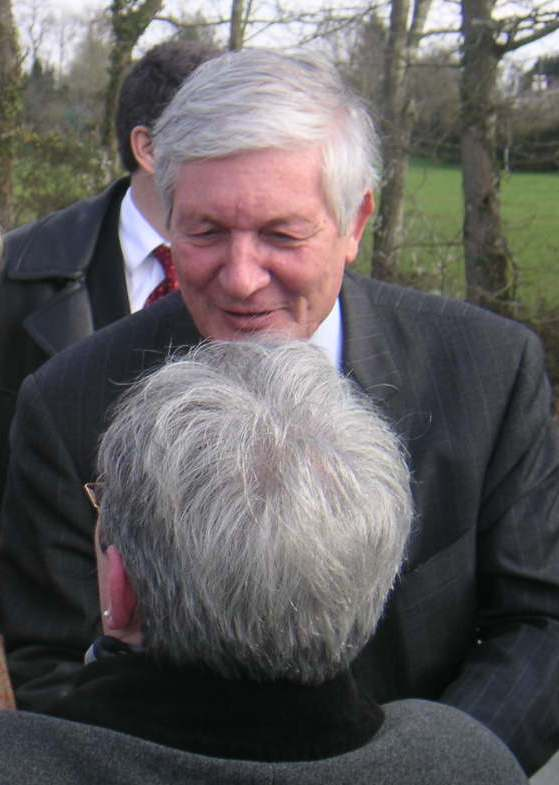
- Pictured in 2005

Member of the Senate
- In office 3 October 1983 – 1 October 2011
- Constituency: Morbihan

Personal details
- Born: Josselin Charles Louis Jean Marie de Rohan-Chabot; 5 June 1938 (age 88) Suresnes, Hauts-de-Seine
- Party: Rally for the Republic; Union for a Popular Movement
- Spouse: Antoinette Boegner
- Children: 3
- Parents: Alain de Rohan-Chabot, 13th Duke of Rohan (father); Hélène de Liencourt (mother)
- Relatives: Rohan-Chabot family
- Education: École nationale d'administration

Josselin Charles Louis Jean Marie de Rohan-Chabot, 14th Duke of Rohan, CBE (French: [ʒɔslɛ̃ də ʁɔɑ̃ ʃabo]; born 5 June 1938), commonly known as Josselin de Rohan, is a French nobleman and retired politician. He is a former member of the Senate of France, where he represented the Morbihan department from 1983 to 2011. He was president of the Rally for the Republic grouping in the Senate from 1993 to 2002, and of the Union for a Popular Movement grouping in the Senate from 2002 to 2008.

== Early life ==
A member of the House of Rohan-Chabot, he is the eldest son of Alain de Rohan-Chabot, 13th Duke of Rohan, and his wife, Hélène de Liencourt. Upon his father's death in 1966, he succeeded to the title of 14th Duke of Rohan. His family residences include Josselin Castle in Morbihan.

Rohan was educated at the École nationale d'administration (ENA), graduating in 1965 in the same class as Ernest-Antoine Seillière, Jean-Pierre Chevènement, Lionel Jospin and Jacques Toubon. He is now a member of the administrative council of ENA.

== Career ==
Close to Jacques Chirac, Rohan was elected to the Senate in 1983, and he was re-elected in 1992 and 2001. He was also Mayor of Josselin from 1965 to 2000, and he served on the General Council of the canton of Josselin from 1982 to 1998.

He was president of the RPR grouping in the Senate from 1993 to 2002, and of the UMP grouping in the Senate from December 2002 until January 2008, when he stated that for him, "the hour of relief has come", though he requested "some time to hand over". He was succeeded by Henri de Raincourt. On 16 January 2008, following the death of Serge Vinçon, Rohan was nonetheless elected President of the Senate's Commission on Foreign Affairs, and re-elected on 8 October 2008.

Rohan served as regional president of the Brittany region from 1998 until his party's defeat by the Socialists led by Jean-Yves Le Drian in the 2004 French regional elections.

In the 2007 presidential election, he supported Nicolas Sarkozy, the UMP candidate. Because of his age, Rohan did not stand in the 2011 senatorial election.

== Marriage and children ==
On 17 November 1973, Rohan married Antoinette Boegner (b. 1946) in Crécy-la-Chapelle (Seine-et-Marne). She is a daughter of Jean-Marc Boegner and granddaughter of pastor Marc Boegner.

Together, they are the parents of three children:

- Alain Louis Marc de Rohan-Chabot (b. 1975), manager of Tarquinia Films.
- Anne-Louise Claire Marie de Rohan-Chabot (b. 1979).
- Olivia Hélène Odilie Marie de Rohan-Chabot (b. 1986).

== Ancestry ==
Ancestors of Josselin de Rohan

16. Charles de Rohan-Chabot, 10th Duc de Rohan
8. Alain de Rohan-Chabot, 11th Duc de Rohan
17. Octavie de Boissy
4. Josselin de Rohan-Chabot, 12th Duc de Rohan
18. César de La Brousse, Marquis de Verteillac, Baron de La Tour Blanche
9. Herminie de La Brousse de Verteillac
19. Marie de Leuze
2. Alain de Rohan-Chabot, 13th Duc de Rohan
20. Fernand de Rohan-Chabot, Comte de Chabot
10. Auguste de Rohan-Chabot, Comte de Jarnac
21. Marie-Auguste Baudon de Mony
5. Marguerite de Rohan-Chabot
22. Jacques Olry
11. Félicie Olry
23. Louise Roederer
1. Josselin de Rohan-Chabot, 14th Duc de Rohan
24. Marie Toussaint de Liencourt
12. Alfred de Liencourt
25. Marie de Joantho
6. Jean de Liencourt
26. François de Blavette
13. Constance de Blavette
27. Marie Le Boulanger de Montigny
3. Hélène de Liencourt
28. Comte Maximilien Begouën
14. Comte Marcel Begouën
29. Léonie Chevreau
7. Marie Begouën
?
15. Claire de Cholet
?

French nobility
Preceded by Alain de Rohan-Chabot	Duke of Rohan; 1966–present	Incumbent
