= Louis-François de Rohan-Chabot =

His Eminence Louis-François-Auguste de Rohan-Chabot
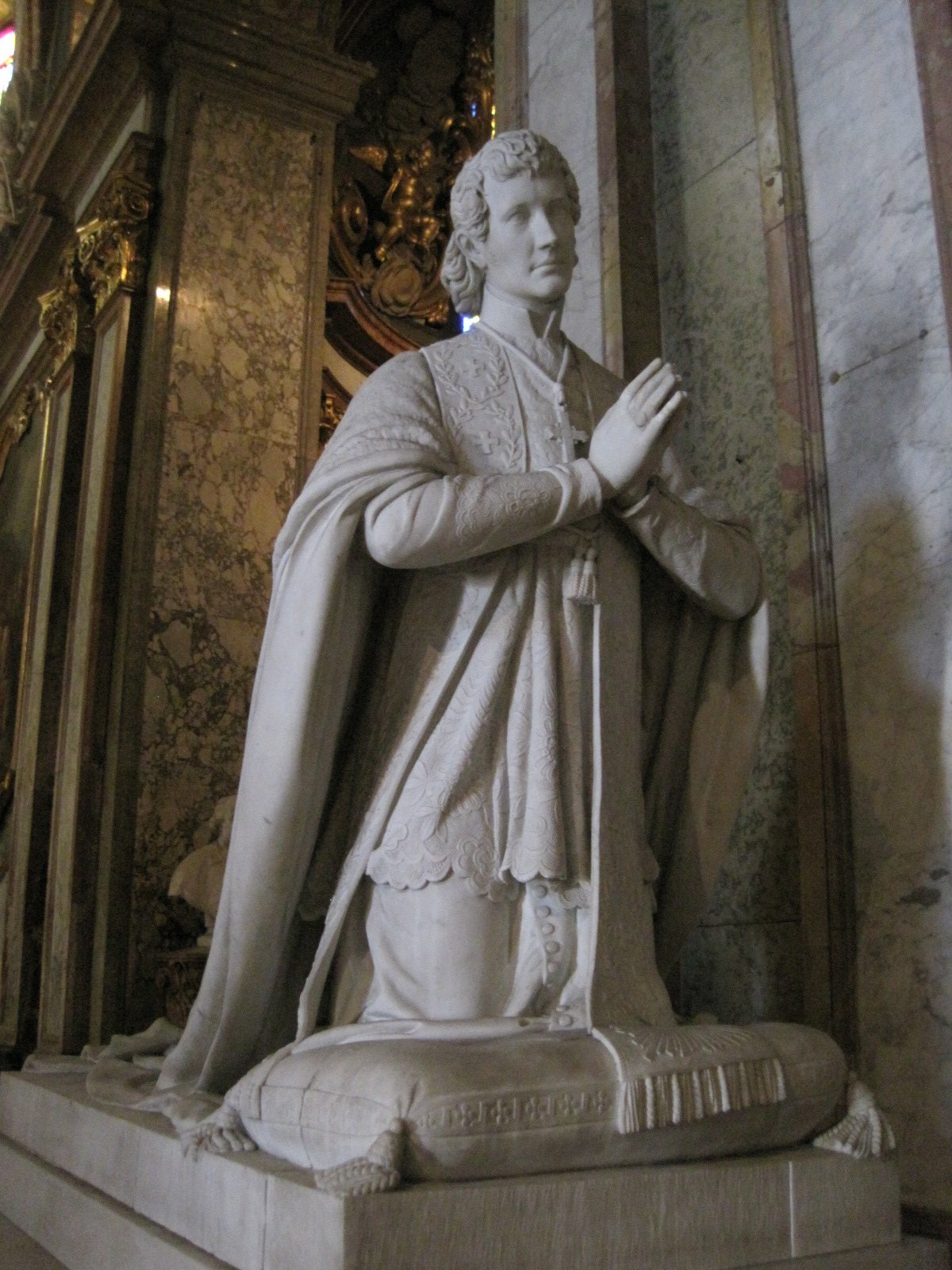
- Statue in Besançon Cathedral, 1835

Personal details
- Born: 29 February 1788 Paris, France
- Died: 8 February 1833 (aged 44) Chenecey, Doubs, Bourgogne-Franche-Comté
- Prince of Léon

8th Duke of Rohan; Prince of Leon; Count of Porhoët
- Predecessor: Alexandre-Louis-Auguste de Rohan-Chabot
- Spouse: Marie Georgine Armandine de Sérent (m. 1808; died 1815)
- House: House of Rohan-Chabot

Ordination history
History
Cardinalate
- Elevated by: Pope Pius VIII

Louis-François-Auguste de Rohan-Chabot (English: /ˈroʊən ʃæˈboʊ/ ROH-ən-sha-BOH, French: [lwi fʁɑ̃swa də ʁɔɑ̃ ʃabo]; 29 February 1788 – 8 February 1833) was a French aristocrat and Catholic prelate who served as Archbishop of Auch and then later as Archbishop of Besançon from 1828 until his death in 1833. He was created cardinal priest on 5 July 1830.

== Early life ==
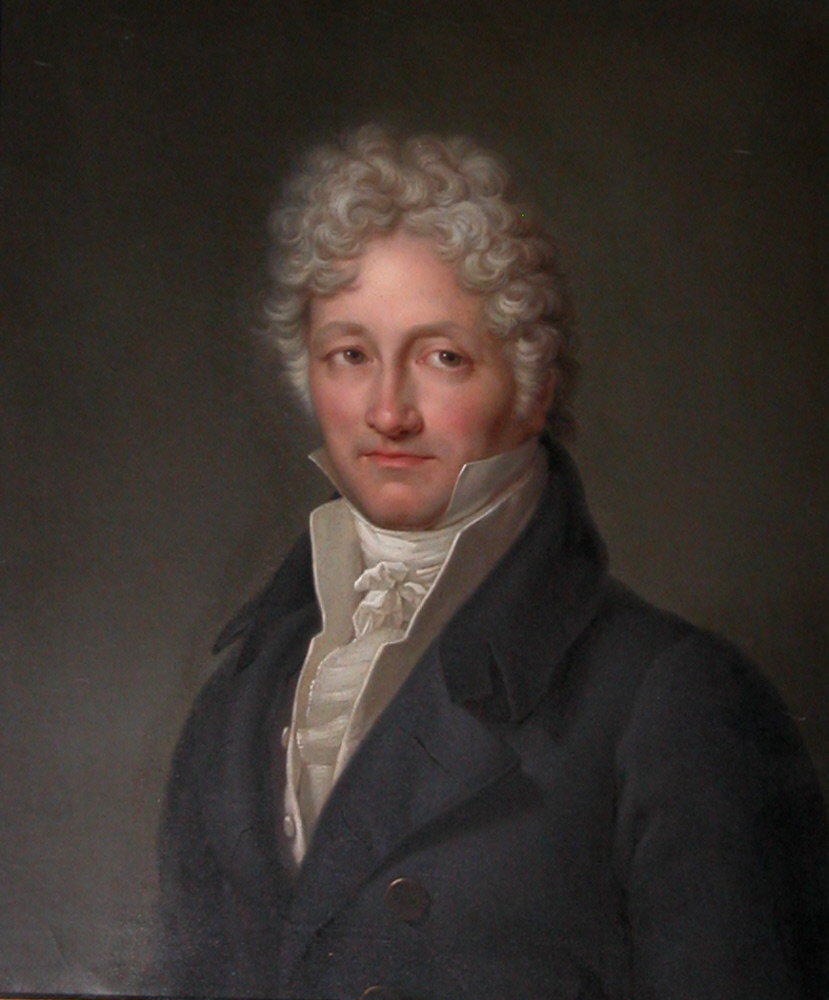
Portrait of his father, Alexandre, Duke of Rohan

Rohan-Chabot was born in Paris on 29 February 1788. He was the eldest son of Alexandre-Louis-Auguste de Rohan-Chabot and Anne Louise Élisabeth de Montmorency (1771–1828). Among his younger siblings were Fernand de Rohan-Chabot, Adélaïde de Rohan-Chabot (who married Aimé Charles de Gontaut-Biron, Marquis de Saint-Blancard), Marie-Charlotte-Léontine de Rohan-Chabot (who married Antoine de Lambertye, Marquis of Gerbéviller), Anne-Louise-Emma-Zoë-Clementine de Rohan-Chabot (who married Count Joseph d'Estourmel), and Louis Charles Philippe Henri de Rohan-Chabot (who married Marie-Caroline de Biencourt).

His paternal grandparents were Louis Antoine de Rohan-Chabot and his first wife, Élisabeth Louise de La Rochefoucauld. His maternal grandparents were Anne Léon de Montmorency, Duke of Montmorency and Charlotte-Françoise de Montmorency-Luxembourg, suo jure 4th Duchess of Montmorency (granddaughter of Charles II de Montmorency-Luxembourg). His grandmother was sister to Anne Charles François de Montmorency, 5th Duke of Montmorency.

== Career ==
He served as chamberlain of the French emperor, Napoleon I Bonaparte, in 1809, which he occupied until the emperor's exile in 1814. As the eldest son and heir apparent, he was styled Prince of Leon. Upon the death of his father in 1816, he became the 8th Duke of Rohan, and Count of Porhoët in 1816, and inherited the family seat, the Château de Josselin, which had been damaged during the Revolution. At the insistence of Caroline, Duchess of Berry, he restored the château in 1822.

=== Religious career ===
After the death of his wife, he devoted himself to the church, entering the Saint-Sulpice Seminary in Paris, from 1819 until 1822. When he entered religious orders, his younger brother, Fernand, took the title, Prince of Léon. He was ordained on 1 June 1822, and preached at La Roche-Guyon before becoming Vicar General of Paris.

He was elected Archbishop of Auch on 23 June 1828, was consecrated on 18 January 1829 at the Cathedral of Paris, by Hyacinthe-Louis de Quélen, Archbishop of Paris, assisted by Louis-Augustine de Montblanc, Archbishop of Tours, and by Guillaume-Aubin de Villèle, Archbishop of Bourges. He was transferred to the Archdiocese of Besançon on 15 December 1828.

He was created Cardinal priest in the consistory of 5 July 1830 by Pope Pius VIII. The fall of the Bourbon monarchy after the July Revolution of 1830 forced him to flee to Belgium and then Switzerland. He participated in the 1830–1831 papal conclave, which elected Pope Gregory XVI. He received the red hat and the title of SS. Trintà al Monte Pincio, on 28 February 1831.

== Personal life ==
On 2 May 1808, Louis-François married Marie Georgine Armandine de Sérent, a granddaughter of the Duke of Sérent. After her death from a fire on 10 January 1815, he devoted himself to the church.

Rohan-Chabot died on 8 February 1833 at Chenecey, Doubs, Bourgogne-Franche-Comté. He was buried in the Besançon Cathedral.

Catholic Church titles
Preceded by Antoine de Morlhon	Archbishop of Auch; 1828	Succeeded by Joachim-Jean-Xavier d'Isoard
Preceded by Paul-Ambroise Frère de Villefrancon	Archbishop of Besançon; 1828–1833	Succeeded by Louis William Valentine DuBourg
