= Alexandre, Duke of Rohan =

Alexandre
- Duke of Rohan
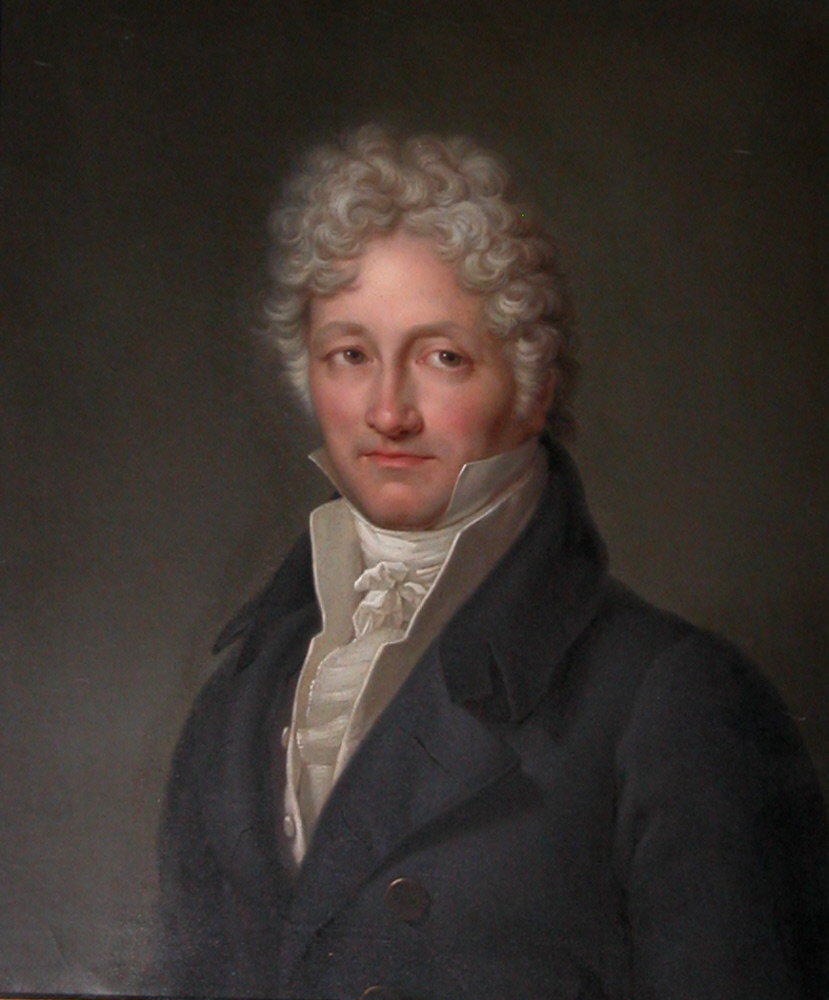
- Born: 3 December 1761; Paris, France
- Died: 8 February 1816 (aged 54); Paris, France
- Spouse: Anne Louise Élisabeth de Montmorency
- Issue Detail: Louis-François de Rohan-Chabot; Fernand, Duke of Rohan
Names
- Alexandre Louis Auguste de Rohan-Chabot
- House: Rohan-Chabot
- Father: Louis Antoine de Rohan-Chabot
- Mother: Élisabeth Louise de La Rochefoucauld

Alexandre Louis Auguste de Rohan-Chabot (English: /ˈroʊən ʃæˈboʊ/ ROH-ən-sha-BOH, French: [alɛksɑ̃dʁ də ʁɔɑ̃ ʃabo]; 3 December 1761 – 8 February 1816), Count of Chabot, then Prince of Leon, 7th Duke of Rohan, Count of Porhoët, was Colonel of the Régiment Royal of the County of Artois, Lieutenant-General of the King's Armies, First Gentleman of the Chamber of King Louis XVIII and hereditary Peer of France.

== Early life ==
Alexandre was born in Paris, France on 3 December 1761. He was the eldest son of Louis Antoine de Rohan-Chabot and his first wife, Élisabeth Louise de La Rochefoucauld (1740–1786). Among his siblings were Armand Charles de Rohan-Chabot, who was murdered during the French Revolution in September 1792, and Alexandrine Charlotte de Rohan-Chabot, who married their uncle, Louis Alexandre de La Rochefoucauld, 6th Duke of La Rochefoucauld. After his murder in September 1792, she married Boniface de Castellane, in 1810. After his mother's death in 1786, his father married Adélaïde Suzanne de Vismes, widow of Jean-Benjamin de La Borde and daughter of Pierre-Martin de Vismes and Marie-Louise Legendre, in 1798.

His paternal grandparents were Guy Auguste de Rohan-Chabot, Viscount of Bignan, and his first wife, Yvonne Sylvie du Breil de Rays. Today, his grandfather is most notable for his 1726 altercation with Voltaire. His maternal grandparents were Jean Baptiste de La Rochefoucauld, Duke of Anville, and Marie Louise Nicole de La Rochefoucauld, Lady of La Roche-Guyon.

== Career ==
At the age of fifteen, he began his military career by entering the Jarnac Dragoons Regiment as a Cadet. In 1777, he was promoted to Lieutenant, and again to captain in 1779. In 1785, he was Second Colonel of the Artois-infantry regiment, in 1788 colonel of the Royal-Piémont-cavalry regiment.

In 1790, he followed the Count of Artois in exile and served as his aide-de-camp, before serving in the Army of Condé. At the end of 1794, he was in Jersey with the French émigrés. He returned to France in 1800. Arrested by the police of the consulate, he was released on the intervention of Joseph Fouché. Unlike his sons, he remained on the sidelines during the First Empire. His eldest son, Louis-François, served as chamberlain of the Emperor Napoléon Bonaparte from 1809 until the emperor's exile in 1814. On the death of his grandmother in 1797, Alexandre and his sister Alexandrine inherited the estate of La Roche-Guyon.

Upon the death of his father on 29 November 1807, he became the 7th Duke of Rohan, and Count of Porhoët. His eldest son then took the title of Prince of Leon.

=== Bourbon Restoration ===
At the first Restoration, in June 1814, he was made a Peer of France and promoted to Lieutenant-general by Louis XVIII. In November 1814, he was able to buy back the Château de Josselin and Pontivy, which his father had to sell in 1802.

In March 1815, replacing the deceased Duke of Fleury he was made First Gentleman of the Chamber of King Louis XVIII, whom he followed to Ghent during the Hundred Days. Returning with the King to Paris, he was made a hereditary Peer of France by an ordinance of 19 August 1815.

== Personal life ==
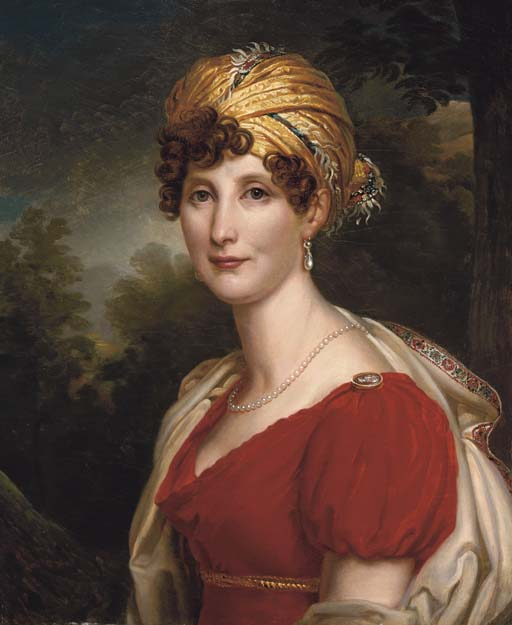
Portrait of Élisabeth de Montmorency, Duchess of Rohan, by François Gérard

On 29 May 1785 in Paris, Alexandre married Anne Louise Élisabeth de Montmorency (1771–1828), daughter of Anne Léon de Montmorency, Duke of Montmorency and Charlotte-Françoise de Montmorency-Luxembourg, suo jure 4th Duchess of Montmorency (granddaughter of Charles II de Montmorency-Luxembourg). She was sister to Anne Charles François de Montmorency, 5th Duke of Montmorency. Together, they were the parents of:

- Louis-François de Rohan-Chabot (1788–1833), who married Marie Georgine Armandine de Sérent, granddaughter of the Duke of Sérent, in 1808. After her death from a fire in 1815, he devoted himself to the church, later serving as Archbishop of Auch, Archbishop of Besançon and cardinal priest.
- Anne Louis Fernand de Rohan-Chabot (1789–1869), who married Josephine Françoise de Gontaut-Biron, daughter of Charles-Michel de Gontaut-Biron, Marquis de Saint Blancard, in 1817.
- Louise-Anne-Léopoldine-Cécilia-Léontine de Rohan-Chabot (1791–1795), who died young.
- Adélaïde-Henriette-Antoinette-Stéphanie de Rohan-Chabot (1793–1869), who married Aimé Charles de Gontaut-Biron, Marquis de Saint Blancard, son of Jean-Armand de Gontaut-Biron, Marquis de Gontaut, in 1812.
- Marie-Charlotte-Léontine de Rohan-Chabot (1796–1841), who married Antoine de Lambertye, Marquis of Gerbéviller, in 1817.
- Anne-Louise-Emma-Zoë-Clementine de Rohan-Chabot (1800–1853), who married Count Joseph d'Estourmel, in 1822.
- Louis Charles Philippe Henri de Rohan-Chabot (1806–1872), Count of Chabot; he married Marie-Caroline de Biencourt in 1831.

After a short illness, the Duke died in Paris on 8 February 1816. Upon his death, the La Roche-Guyon estate was divided between his six surviving children. The château, the park and part of the land went to his eldest son, the future Cardinal Louis-François de Rohan-Chabot, who succeeded him as the 8th Duke of Rohan.

=== Portrait ===
A head-and-shoulders portrait, previously attributed to Baron François Gérard, of the Duke where he is "turned to the left, gazing to the right, against plain darkish grey background. Short, light grey curly hair. High white collar, white cravat. Dark grey-blue jacket" is today held at Ickworth House, Suffolk, the residence of the Marquesses of Bristol. The Duke of Rohan and his wife were close friends of Frederick Hervey, 1st Marquess of Bristol and his wife Elizabeth, Marchioness of Bristol.
