= Fernand, Duke of Rohan =

Fernand
- 9th Duke of Rohan
- Born: 14 October 1789; Paris, France
- Died: 20 September 1869 (aged 79); Reuil-en-Brie, France
- Spouse: Joséphine Françoise de Gontaut-Biron (m. 1817; died 1844)
- Issue: Charles, Duke of Rohan; Isabelle de Rohan-Chabot; Louise-Anne de Rohan-Chabot; Charles-Fernand de Rohan-Chabot; Alexandrine-Amélie de Rohan-Chabot; Henri-Léonor de Rohan-Chabot; Jeanne-Charlotte de Rohan-Chabot
Names
- Anne-Louis-Fernand de Rohan-Chabot
- House: Rohan
- Father: Alexandre-Louis-Auguste de Rohan-Chabot
- Mother: Anne Louise Élisabeth de Montmorency

Anne-Louis-Fernand de Rohan-Chabot, 9th Duke of Rohan (English: /ˈroʊən ʃæˈboʊ/ ROH-ən-sha-BOH, French: [fɛʁnɑ̃ də ʁɔɑ̃ ʃabo]; 14 October 1789 – 20 September 1869), Prince of Léon from 1820 to 1833, was a Peer of France who served as aide-de-camp to the Duke of Berry, then squire of the Duke of Bordeaux, before he himself was made Maréchal de camp. He was awarded as a Commander of the Legion of Honour, Knight of Saint-Louis and of the Military Merit Order of Bavaria.

== Early life ==
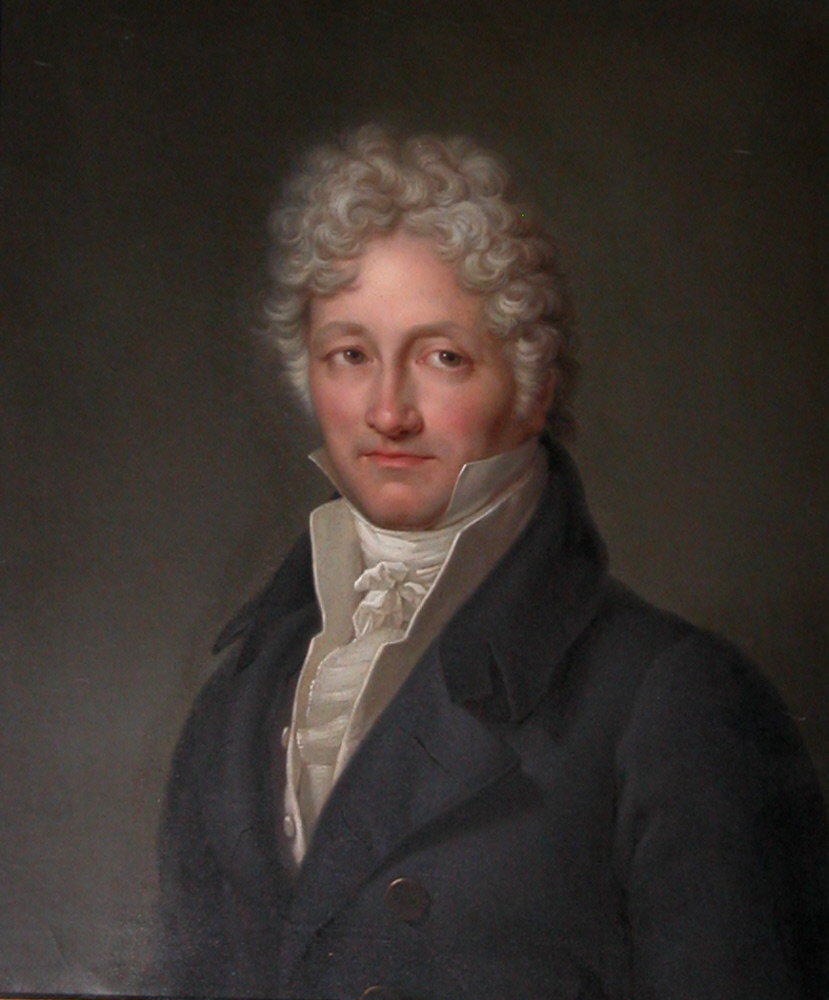
Portrait of his father, Alexandre, Duke of Rohan

Rohan-Chabot was born in Paris on 14 October 1789. He was the second son of Alexandre-Louis-Auguste de Rohan-Chabot and Anne Louise Élisabeth de Montmorency (1771–1828). His elder brother was Louis-François de Rohan-Chabot. Among his younger siblings were Adélaïde de Rohan-Chabot (who married Aimé Charles de Gontaut-Biron, Marquis de Saint-Blancard), Marie-Charlotte-Léontine de Rohan-Chabot (who married Antoine de Lambertye, Marquis of Gerbéviller), Anne-Louise-Emma-Zoë-Clementine de Rohan-Chabot (who married Count Joseph d'Estourmel), and Louis Charles Philippe Henri de Rohan-Chabot (who married Marie-Caroline de Biencourt).

His paternal grandparents were Louis Antoine de Rohan-Chabot and his first wife, Élisabeth Louise de La Rochefoucauld. His maternal grandparents were Anne Léon de Montmorency, Duke of Montmorency and Charlotte-Françoise de Montmorency-Luxembourg, suo jure 4th Duchess of Montmorency (granddaughter of Charles II de Montmorency-Luxembourg). His grandmother was sister to Anne Charles François de Montmorency, 5th Duke of Montmorency.

As a child during the French Revolution, Fernand and his parents left to emigrate in 1790 and did not return to France until 1800.

== Career ==
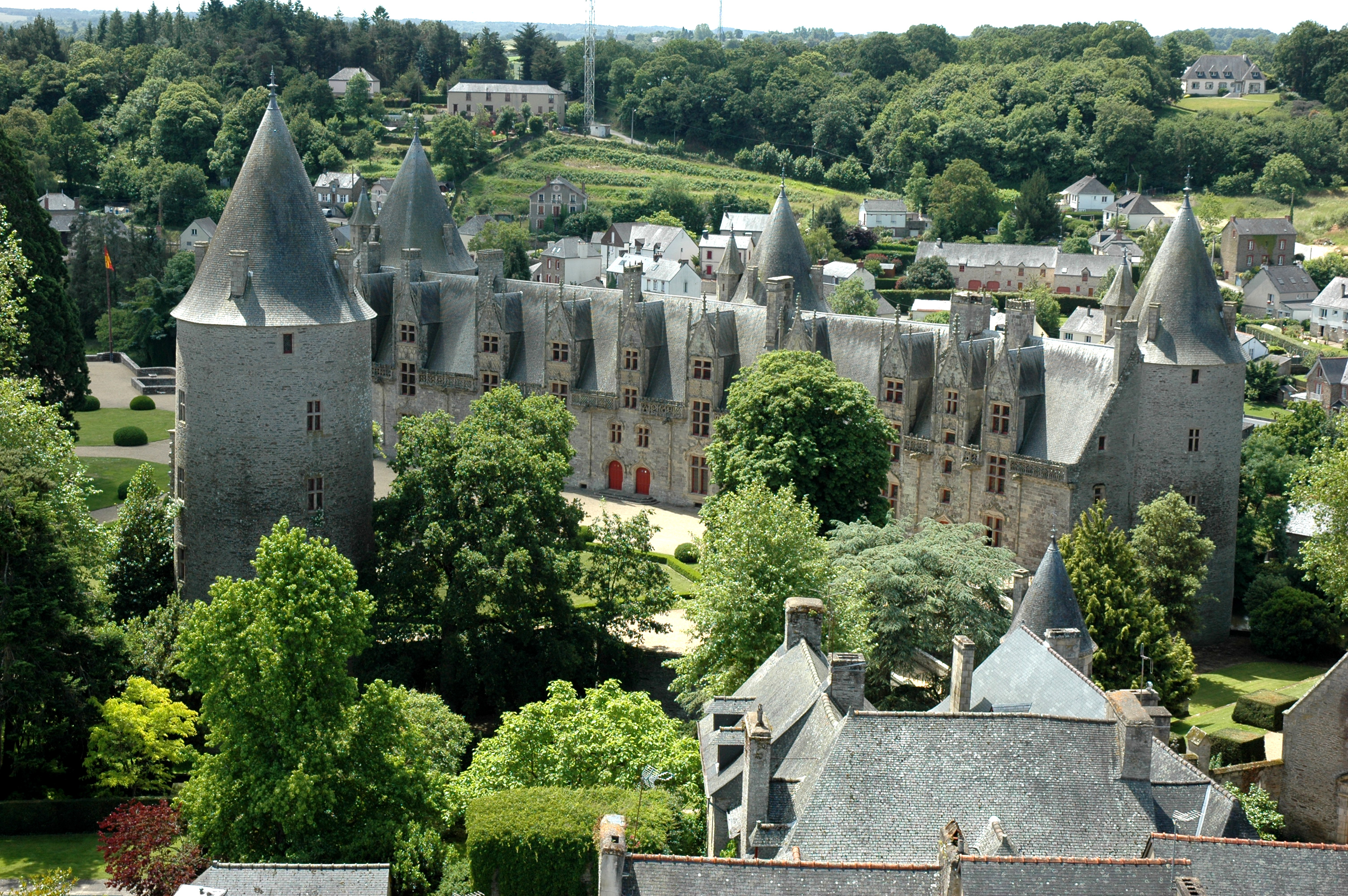
Château de Josselin in Morbihan

Rohan entered the French Imperial Army in 1809 as a second lieutenant of Cuirassiers. He fought in the campaign against Austria in 1809, then the campaign against Russia in 1812, where he was aide-de-camp to General Narbonne, himself aide-de-camp to Emperor Napoleon I. In 1813, he took part in the Battle of Dresden. Taken prisoner on the Elbe in 1814, he was released, joined the French army and was promoted to Squadron leader.

Having joined the Restoration in the spring of 1814, he was made a Staff colonel and Knight of the Order of Saint Louis. He then served as aide-de-camp to the Duke of Berry, whom he accompanied to Ghent during the Hundred Days. In 1820, he became first aide-de-camp and gentleman-in-waiting to the Duke of Berry's son, Henri, Duke of Bordeaux. In 1824, he was made Colonel of the Hussars of the Guard, first equerry of the Duke of Bordeaux. In 1828, he was made Maréchal de camp. During the July Revolution of 1830, he refused, out of loyalty to the elder branch of the Bourbons, to swear an oath to Louis-Philippe, then remaining, with his wife, in opposition to the July Monarchy.

=== Duke of Rohan ===
His elder brother, Louis-François de Rohan-Chabot, had married Marie Georgine Armandine de Sérent, granddaughter of the Duke of Sérent, in 1808. After her death from a fire in 1815, he devoted himself to the church, becoming a Catholic prelate, serving as Archbishop of Auch, then Archbishop of Besançon and Cardinal before his death on 8 February 1833. When his brother entered religious orders, Fernand took the title, Prince of Léon. Louis-François, who had succeeded their father as Duke of Rohan in 1816, died without issue in 1833, therefore, Fernand succeeded as the 9th Duke of Rohan and inherited the family seat, the Château de Josselin, which had been damaged during the Revolution but restored by his elder brother in 1822 upon the insistence of Caroline, Duchess of Berry.

== Personal life ==
On 19 May 1817, he married Joséphine Françoise de Gontaut-Biron de Saint-Blancard (1796–1844), a daughter of Lieutenant-General Charles Michel de Gontaut, Viscount of Gontaut-Biron-Saint-Blancard, and Marie-Louise-Joséphine de Montault de Navailles, governess of the Children of France. Before her death in 1844, they were the parents of seven children:

- Charles-Louis-Josselin de Rohan-Chabot (1819–1893), who married Octavie Rouillé de Boissy, daughter of Hilaire-Etienne-Octave Rouillé, Marquis of Boissy, in 1843.
- Louise-Joséphine-Isabelle de Rohan-Chabot (1822–1844), who married Marie Alfred Charles Gaston de Béthisy, Marquis of Mézières, in 1841.
- Louise-Anne-Françoise de Rohan-Chabot (1824–1868), who married Austrian ambassador Georg Alexander Esterházy von Galantha, Count of Esterházy, in 1846.
- Charles-Guy-Fernand de Rohan-Chabot (1828–1908), who married Marie-Augusta Baudon de Mony, in 1858.
- Alexandrine-Amélie-Marie de Rohan-Chabot (1831–1907), who married Henri Charles Louis de Beurges, Count of Beurges, in 1851.
- Henri-Raoul-Léonor de Rohan-Chabot (1835–1922), who married Adélaïde Berthe de Chabrol-Tournoël, in 1860.
- Jeanne-Charlotte-Clémentine de Rohan-Chabot (1839–1929), who married Arthur d'Anthoine, Baron of Saint-Joseph (a great-grandson of François Clary), in 1865.

The Duke died at the Château de Reuil-en-Brie on 20 September 1869, and was succeeded by his eldest son, Charles.

French nobility
Preceded by Louis-François de Rohan-Chabot	Duke of Rohan; 1833–1869	Succeeded by Charles de Rohan-Chabot
