= Guy Auguste de Rohan-Chabot =

Count of France

Guy Auguste de Rohan-Chabot known as the comte de Chabot (18 August 1683 – 13 September 1760), often referred to as Chevalier de Rohan, was a French nobleman most notable for an altercation with Voltaire.

== Early life ==
Guy-Auguste was born on 18 August 1683. He was the son of Louis de Rohan-Chabot, Duc de Rohan, Prince de Leon and Marie Élisabeth du Bec-Crespin de Grimaldi, Marquise de Vardes.

== Altercation with Voltaire ==
Guy-Auguste is mostly remembered for an altercation with the young Voltaire in 1725, in which both men insulted each other. He then arranged for his servants to assault Voltaire while he watched from his carriage. When Voltaire then exercised his right to demand that Guy-Auguste face him in a duel, the Rohan family obtained a lettre de cachet from French King Louis XV and used this warrant to force Voltaire first into imprisonment in the Bastille and then into exile in Great Britain. Ironically, this exile proved to be of great importance to Voltaire's development as a philosopher; his exposure to the more limited constitutional monarchy of England and its emphasis on the protection of civil rights as opposed to the absolute and unrestrained rule of the French kings marked many of his later political writings.

== Personal life ==
On 7 February 1729, Guy Auguste married Yvonne Sylvie du Breil de Rays (1712–1740). Before her death on 15 July 1740, he fathered a daughter and two sons:

- Marie-Charlotte-Sylvie de Rohan-Chabot (1729–1807), who married Jean Baptiste Louis de Clermont d'Amboise, Marquis de Reynel and Marquis de Montglas.
- Louis Antoine Auguste de Rohan-Chabot (1733–1807), who married Élisabeth Louise de La Rochefoucauld. After her death in 1786, he married Adélaïde Suzanne de Vismes, widow of Jean-Benjamin de La Borde and daughter of Pierre-Martin de Vismes and Marie-Louise Legendre, in 1798.
- Charles Rosalie de Rohan-Chabot (1740–1813), Count of Jarnac, who married Guyonne Hyacinthe de Pons Saint Maurice, a daughter of Charles Philippe de Pons Saint-Maurice. After her death in 1761, he married Elisabeth Smith.

After his wife's death he married Lady Mary Apolonia Scolastica Stafford-Howard (1721–1769) on 25 May 1744. She was the daughter of William Stafford-Howard, 2nd Earl of Stafford, de jure 3rd Baron Stafford.

He died on 13 September 1760 in Paris, France. His son, Louis Antoine, succeeded Guy Auguste's father as the Duke of Rohan as did his grandson, Alexandre, Duke of Rohan.

=== Descendants ===
Through his son Charles Rosalie, he was a grandfather of Adélaïde Louise Guyonne de Rohan-Chabot (1761–1805), also known as Mademoiselle de Jarnac, who was the first wife of Boniface Louis André de Castellane (parents of Marshal of France Boniface de Castellane). After Adélaïde died in 1805, Boniface married her cousin, another of Guy Auguste's granddaughters, Alexandrine Charlotte de Rohan-Chabot, widow of Louis Alexandre de La Rochefoucauld, 6th Duke of La Rochefoucauld. (Note: Alexandrine Charlotte de Rohan-Chabot was also the lover of William Short, the "adoptive son" of Thomas Jefferson, who served as U.S. Ambassador to France, the Netherlands, and Spain. Alexandrine and William exchanged hundreds of love letters.)
