= Odo of Porhoët =

Odo, Eudo or Eudes of Porhoët may refer to:

- Odo I, Viscount of Porhoët (d. c. 1092)
- Odo II, Viscount of Porhoët (d. c. 1180), also duke of Brittany (1148–1156)
- Odo III, Viscount of Porhoët (d. 1231)
