= Cardinals created by Pius VIII =

Catholic appointments from 1829 to 1830

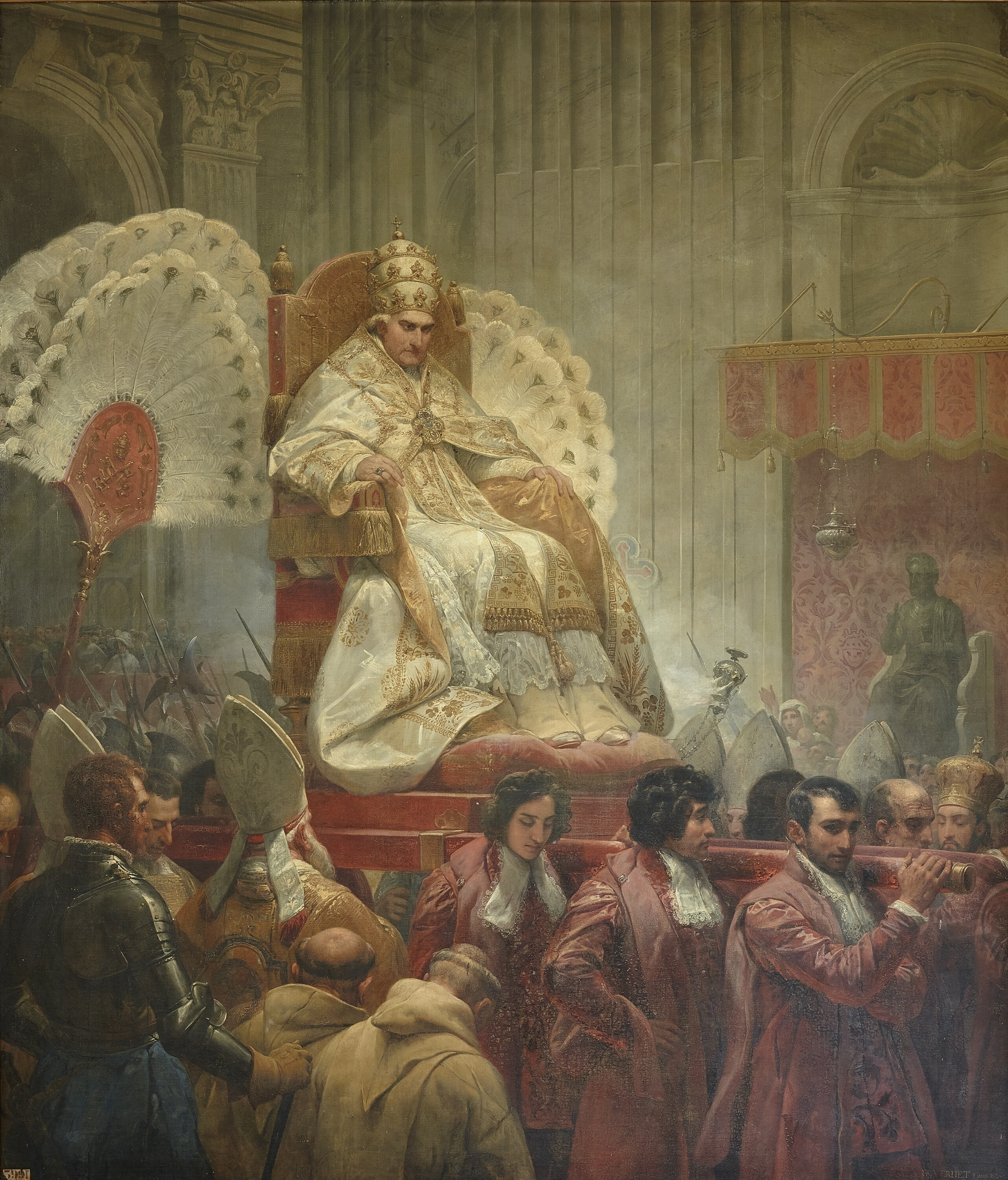
Pope Pius VIII (1761–1830).

Pope Pius VIII (r. 1829–1830) created six new cardinals in three consistories. None of them ever were Pope. The next time this happened was with Benedict XVI (r. 2005–2013).

== 27 July 1829 ==
1. Cesare Nembrini Pironi Gonzaga, bishop of Ancona – cardinal-priest of S. Anastasia (received the title on 28 September 1829), † 5 December 1837
2. Remigio Crescini, bishop of Parma – cardinal-priest of S. Giovanni a Porta Latina (received the title on 5 July 1830), † 20 July 1830

== 15 March 1830 ==
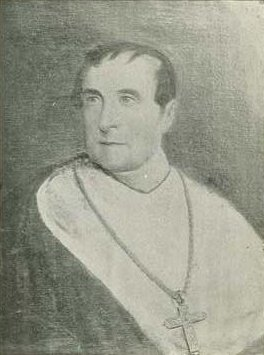
Thomas Weld (1773-1837), made a cardinal on March 15, 1830.

All the new cardinals received their titles on 5 July 1830.

1. Thomas Weld, titular bishop of Amiclea – cardinal-priest of S. Marcello, † 10 April 1837
2. Raffaele Mazio – cardinal-priest of S. Maria in Trastevere, † 4 February 1832
3. Domenico de Simone, prefect of the Papal Household – cardinal-deacon of S. Angelo in Pescheria, † 9 November 1837

Eight other cardinals were created in pectore but their names were never published.

== 5 July 1830 ==
1. Louis François-Auguste de Rohan Chabot, archbishop of Besançon – cardinal-priest of SS. Trintà al Monte Pincio (received the title on 28 February 1831), † 8 February 1833

== Sources ==
- Miranda, Salvador. "Consistories for the creation of Cardinals, 19th Century (1800-1903): Pius VIII (1829-1830)". The Cardinals of the Holy Roman Church. Florida International University. OCLC 53276621.
