= Alan I =

Alan I may refer to:

- Alan I, King of Brittany (died 907)
- Alan I, Viscount of Rohan (1084–1147)
