= Louis Marie =

Louis Marie may refer to:

- Louis Marie, Duke of Rambouillet (1746–1749), French nobleman
- Louis Marie, Duke of Rohan (1710–1791), French aristocrat and soldier
