= Alain I (disambiguation) =

Alain I most commonly refers to Alain I of Albret (1440–1522), the 16th Lord of Albret, however it may also refer to:

- Alan I, Viscount of Rohan (1084–1147), also known as Alain de Rohan, was the first viscount of Rohan
- Alan I, King of Brittany (died 907), also known as Alain, was likely the only king of Brittany to hold the title by grant of an emperor
