= Duke of Rohan =

Title of French nobility

Duke of Rohan is a title of French nobility, associated with the Breton region of Rohan.

== Duke of Rohan ==
=== House of Rohan ===
Picture	Name	Father	Birth	Marriage	Became Duke	Ceased to be Duke	Death	Spouse
	Henri de Rohan	René II, Viscount of Rohan (Rohan)	21 August 1579	7 February 1605	7 August 1603; Rohan raised from viscountcy	13 April 1638		Marguerite de Béthune
	Marguerite de Rohan suo jure	Henri, Duke of Rohan (Rohan)	1617	6 June 1645	13 April 1638 father's death	9 April 1684		Henri Chabot
Picture	Name	Father	Birth	Marriage	Became Duke	Ceased to be Duke	Death	Spouse

=== House of Chabot ===
Picture	Name	Father	Birth	Marriage	Became Duke	Ceased to be Duke	Death	Spouse
	Henri Chabot	Charles Chabot (Chabot)	1616	6 June 1645	1648 created Duke of Rohan in his own right	27 February 1655		Marguerite de Rohan
Picture	Name	Father	Birth	Marriage	Became Duke	Ceased to be Duke	Death	Spouse

=== House of Rohan-Chabot ===
The title prince de Léon is used a courtesy title until the succession of the duke.

Picture	Name	Father	Birth	Marriage	Became Duke	Ceased to be Duke	Death	Spouse
	Louis de Rohan-Chabot	Henri Chabot (Rohan-Chabot)	3 November 1652	18 July 1678	27 February 1655 father's death	17 August 1727		Marie Élisabeth du Bec-Crespin de Grimaldi
	Louis Bretagne Alain de Rohan-Chabot	Louis I (Rohan-Chabot)	26 September 1679	29 May 1708	17 August 1727 father's death	10 August 1738		Françoise de Roquelaure
	Louis Marie de Rohan-Chabot	Louis II (Rohan-Chabot)	17 January 1710	19 December 1735	10 August 1738 father's death	28 November 1791		(1) Charlotte Rosalie de Châtillon (2) Charlotte de Crussol d'Uzès
	Louis Antoine de Rohan-Chabot	Guy Auguste de Rohan-Chabot (Rohan-Chabot)	20 April 1733	12 April 1757	28 November 1791 uncle's death	29 November 1807		Élisabeth Louise de La Rochefoucauld
	Alexandre de Rohan-Chabot	Louis Antoine, Duke of Rohan (Rohan-Chabot)	3 December 1761	29 May 1785	29 November 1807 father's death	8 February 1816		Anne Louise Élisabeth de Montmorency
	Louis-François de Rohan-Chabot	Alexandre, Duke of Rohan (Rohan-Chabot)	29 February 1788	2 May 1808	8 February 1816 father's death	8 February 1833		Marie Georgine Armandine de Sérent
	Fernand de Rohan-Chabot	Alexandre, Duke of Rohan (Rohan-Chabot)	14 October 1789	19 May 1817	8 February 1833 brothers death	10 September 1869		Josephine Françoise de Gontaut-Biron
	Charles de Rohan-Chabot	Fernand, Duke of Rohan (Rohan-Chabot)	12 December 1819	29 June 1843	10 September 1869 father's death	6 August 1893		Octavie Rouillé de Boissy
	Alain de Rohan-Chabot	Charles, Duke of Rohan (Rohan-Chabot)	1 December 1844	26 June 1872	6 August 1893 father's death	6 January 1914		Herminie de La Brousse de Verteillac
	Josselin de Rohan-Chabot	Alain, Duke of Rohan (Rohan-Chabot)	4 April 1879	11 June 1906	6 January 1914 father's death	13 July 1916		Marguerite Marie de Rohan-Chabot
	Alain Louis Auguste de Rohan-Chabot	Josselin, Duke of Rohan (Rohan-Chabot)	10 May 1913	5 May 1937	13 July 1916 father's death	17 May 1966		Helene Claire Marie de Liencourt
	Josselin de Rohan-Chabot	Alain Louis Auguste, Duke of Rohan (Rohan-Chabot)	5 June 1938	17 November 1973	17 May 1966 father's death	N/A		Antoinette Jeanne Yvonne Boegner
Picture	Name	Father	Birth	Marriage	Became Duke	Ceased to be Duke	Death	Spouse

== See also ==
- House of Rohan
