= Antonio Maria Cadolini =

Italian cardinal (1771–1851)

His Eminence Antonio Maria Cadolini CRSP
- Bishop of Ancona e Numana
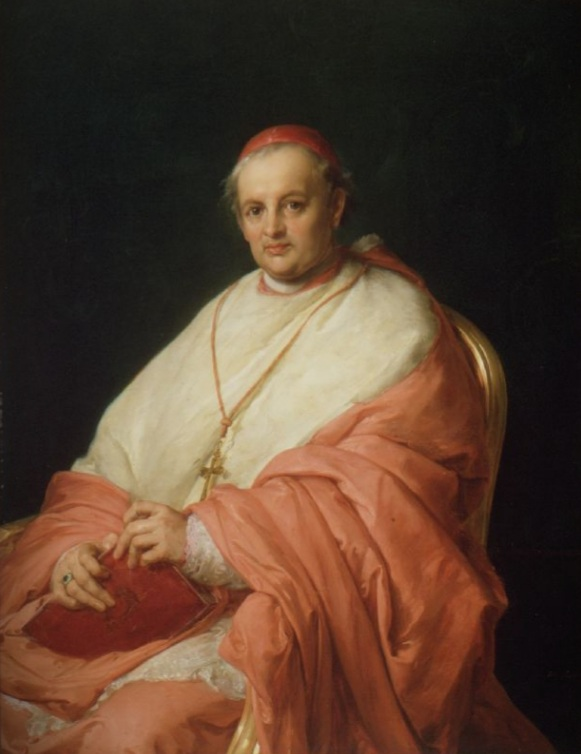
- Painting of Cadolini by Francesco Podesti
- Church: Catholic Church
- Diocese: Ancona e Numana
- Appointed: 12 February 1838
- Term ended: 1 August 1851
- Predecessor: Cesare Nembrini Pironi Gonzaga
- Successor: Antonio Benedetto Antonucci
- Other posts: Bishop of Cesena (1822–1838); Cardinal-Priest of San Clemente (1843–1851)

Orders
- Ordination: 19 April 1794
- Consecration: 21 April 1822 by Francesco Saverio Maria Felice Castiglioni
- Created cardinal: 19 June 1843 by Pope Gregory XVI

Personal details
- Born: 10 July 1771 Ancona, Papal States
- Died: 1 August 1851 (aged 80)

Antonio Maria Cadolini (10 July 1771 – 1 August 1851) was an Italian Roman Catholic prelate who served as bishop of the Diocese of Cesena from 1822 to 1838 and bishop of the Diocese of Ancona e Numana from 1838 to his death in 1851.
