= Louis Antoine, Duke of Rohan =

Louis
- 6th Duke of Rohan
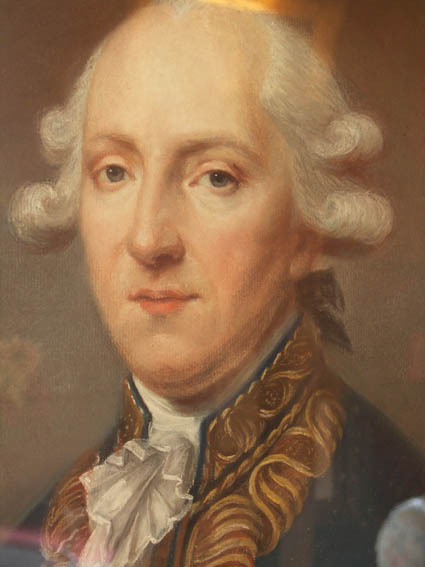
- Born: 20 April 1733
- Died: 29 November 1807 (aged 74); Paris, France
- Spouse: Élisabeth-Louise de La Rochefoucauld (m. 1757; died 1786) Adélaïde Suzanne de Vismes (m. 1798; died 1807)
- Issue: Alexandre, Duke of Rohan; Alexandrine de Rohan-Chabot; Armand Charles de Rohan-Chabot
Names
- Louis-Antoine-Auguste de Rohan-Chabot
- House: Rohan
- Father: Guy Auguste de Rohan-Chabot
- Mother: Yvonne Sylvie du Breil de Rays

Louis-Antoine-Auguste de Rohan-Chabot, 6th Duke of Rohan (English: /ˈroʊən ʃæˈboʊ/ ROH-ən-sha-BOH, French: [lwi ɑ̃twan də ʁɔɑ̃ ʃabo]; 20 April 1733 – 29 November 1807), Prince, Count and Baron of Léon, Duke of Chabot, then 6th Duke of Rohan in 1791, was a French aristocrat and general officer.

== Early life ==
Rohan-Chabot was born on 20 April 1733. He was the son of Guy Auguste de Rohan-Chabot, Viscount of Bignan, Lieutenant General of the King's Armies (French: Lieutenant Général des armées), and, his first wife, Yvonne Sylvie du Breil de Rays (1712–1740). In 1726, his father became famous for an altercation with Voltaire. From his parents' marriage, he had an elder sister, Marie Sylvie Alias Charlotte de Rohan-Chabot (who married Jean Baptiste Louis de Clermont d'Amboise, Marquis de Reynel and Marquis de Montglas), and a younger brother, Charles Rosalie de Rohan-Chabot, Count of Jarnac (who married Guyonne Hyacinthe de Pons Saint Maurice and, after her death in 1761, Elisabeth Smith). After his mother's death in 1740, his father married Lady Mary Apolonia Scolastica Stafford-Howard (the daughter of William Stafford-Howard, 2nd Earl of Stafford, de jure 3rd Baron Stafford).

His paternal grandparents were Louis de Rohan-Chabot, 3rd Duke of Rohan, and Marie Élisabeth du Bec-Crespin de Grimaldi, Marquise de Vardes. His maternal grandparents were Charles du Breil, Marquis de Rays and Sylvie de La Boissiere de Brantonnet.

== Career ==
He began serving in the King's Armies at the age of fourteen. In 1748, he served in the Flanders campaigns as a cornet. In 1749, he became Colonel in the Grenadier Regiment and mestre de camp of the Royal Foreign Cavalry Regiment in 1756, which he commanded at the Battle of Hastembreke, the capture of Minden, Hanover (1757), the Battle of Krefeld (1758), Minden (1759), Kloster Kampen (1760), and the Battle of Warburg. He conducted himself admirably in the Seven Years' War, which earned him the nickname "the young hero" by Marshal Charles Louis Auguste Fouquet, Duke of Belle-Isle. In 1763, he was promoted to Brigadier of Cavalry, to Maréchal de camp in 1772, and to Lieutenant General in 1781.

In 1769, he inherited the estate of his cousin, Henriette Charlotte de Chabot, widow of Charles-Hannibal de Rohan-Chabot, including the Château de Marouatte.

=== French revolution ===
In 1791, he inherited the estate of his first cousin, Louis Marie de Rohan-Chabot, 5th Duke of Rohan, and Peer of France, who also died without surviving issue. In the midst of French Revolution, he became the 6th Duke of Rohan and head of the House of Rohan-Chabot.

An emigrant from 1790 to 1792, he maintained correspondence with Madame du Barry in 1793 and was convinced of having received a loan of 200,000 pounds from her to support the War in the Vendée.

In 1794, his Château de Pontivy was confiscated and he had to sell several of his properties, Château de Blain, Château de Josselin, Château de Kerguèhennec, to Louis de Janzé during the Revolution. He died in Paris in 1807, before the Restoration, which allowed his son, Alexandre-Louis-Auguste de Rohan-Chabot, to buy back several of the family estates from the Viscount of Janzé in 1814: the châteaux of Pontivy and Josselin, still held by the Dukes of Rohan.

== Personal life ==
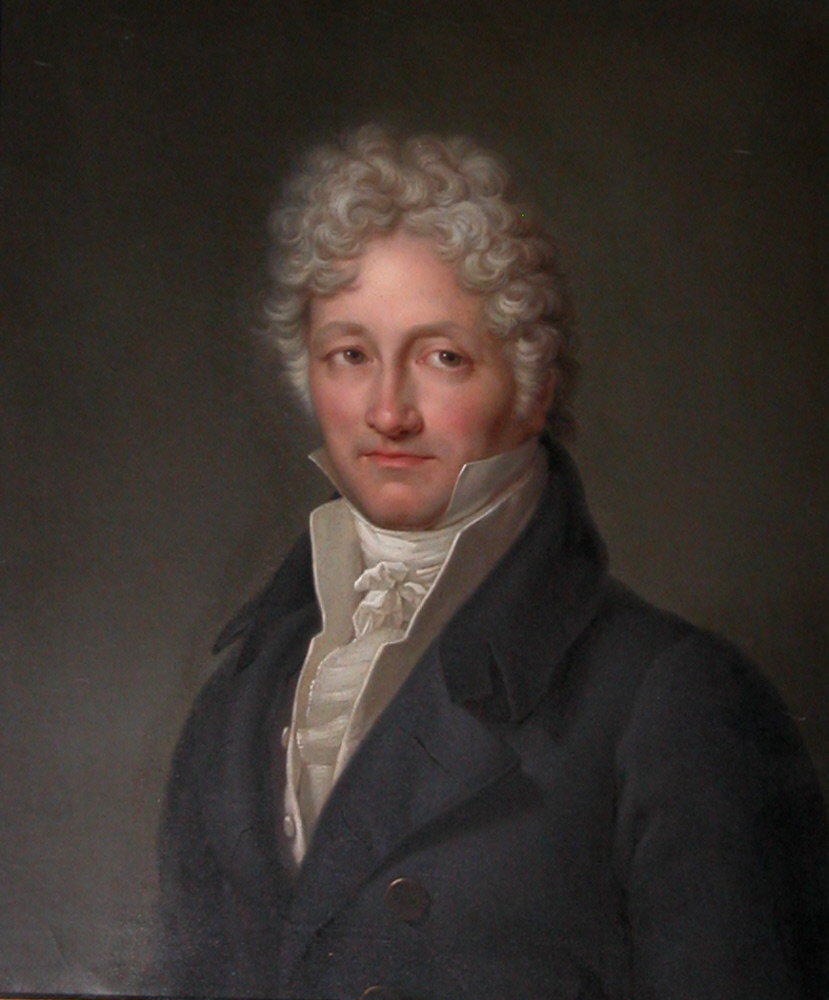
Portrait of his eldest son, Alexandre, Duke of Rohan

On 12 April 1757, he married Élisabeth-Louise de La Rochefoucauld (1740–1786), daughter of Jean Baptiste de La Rochefoucauld, Duke of Anville, Lieutenant-General of the Naval Armies, and Marie Louise Nicole de La Rochefoucauld, Lady of La Roche-Guyon. On the death of his mother-in-law, Marie Louise Nicole de La Rochefoucauld, in 1797, his two surviving children inherited the estate of La Roche-Guyon. Before her death on 12 December 1786, they were the parents of:

- Alexandre-Louis-Auguste de Rohan-Chabot (1761–1816), who married Anne Louise Élisabeth de Montmorency, daughter of Anne Léon de Montmorency, Duke of Montmorency and Charlotte-Françoise de Montmorency-Luxembourg, suo jure 4th Duchess of Montmorency (granddaughter of Charles II de Montmorency-Luxembourg), in 1785. She was sister to Anne Charles François de Montmorency, 5th Duke of Montmorency.
- Alexandrine Charlotte de Rohan-Chabot (1763–1839), who married, as his second wife, her maternal uncle Louis Alexandre de La Rochefoucauld, 6th Duke of La Rochefoucauld (widower of Louise-Pauline de Gand de Mérode), in 1780. After he was executed in September 1792 during the September Massacres of the Reign of Terror, she married Boniface Louis André de Castellane, Marquis of Castellane, in 1810.
- Armand Charles Just de Rohan-Chabot (1767–1792), who was executed in September 1792 during the September Massacres; he died unmarried.

On 14 March 1798, he remarried to Adélaïde Suzanne de Vismes, widow of Jean-Benjamin de La Borde (guillotined in 1794), and daughter of Pierre-Martin de Vismes and Marie-Louise Legendre. He did not have any children with his second wife.

The Duke died in Paris on 29 November 1807 and was buried at the Château de La Roche-Guyon.

French nobility
Preceded by Louis Marie de Rohan-Chabot	Duke of Rohan; 1791–1807	Succeeded by Alexandre de Rohan-Chabot
