= Château de la Trousse =

Stately home in Île-de-France, France

Coordinates: 49°01′08″N 3°04′11″E

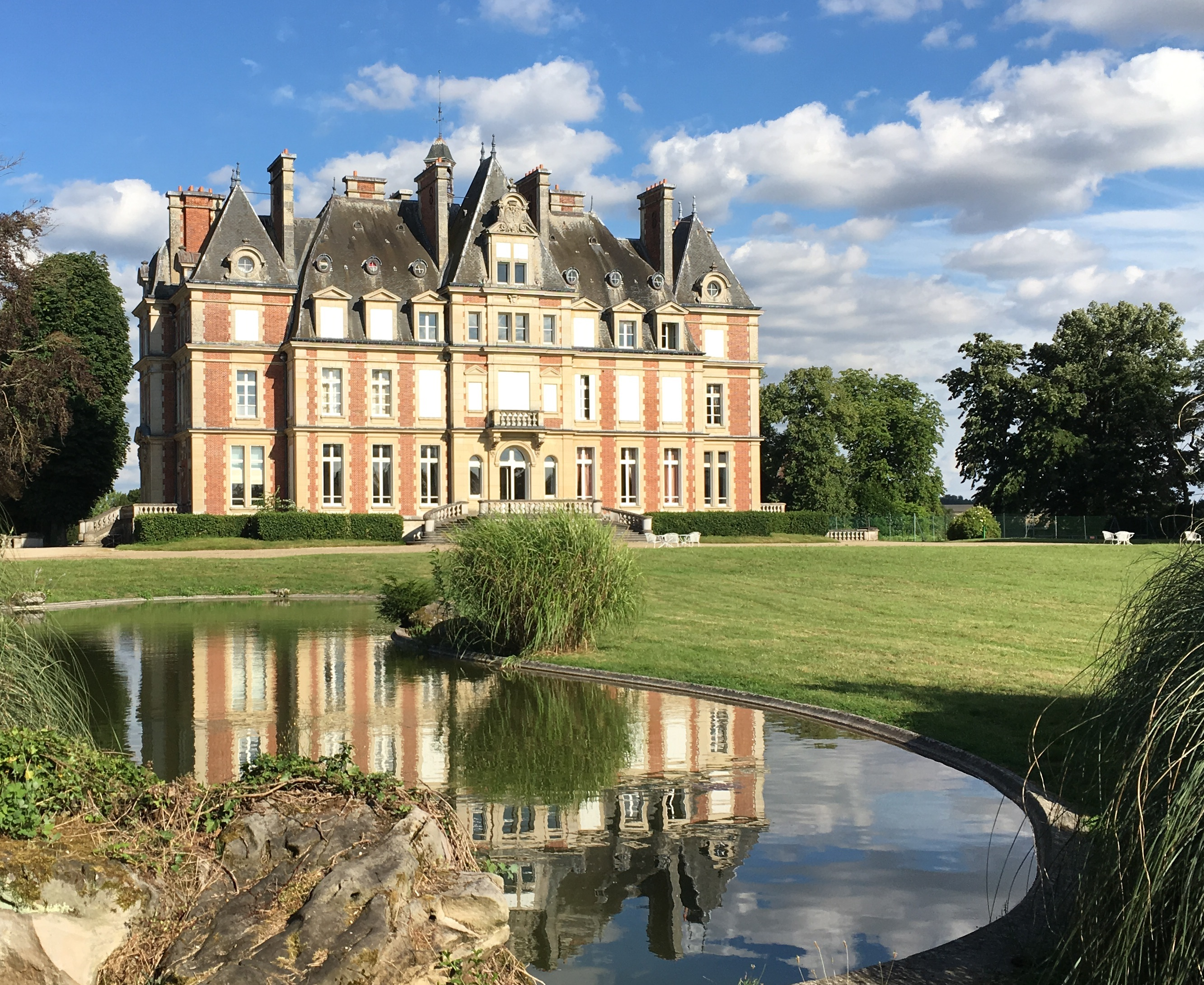
Château de la Trousse

Château de la Trousse is a stately home situated in the commune of Ocquerre in the Seine-et-Marne department in the Île-de-France region in north-central France.

== History ==
The original château was built around 1630 in the reign of Louis XIII by Sebastian le Hardy whose family lived there until 1791.

Louis XIV is said to have visited around 1651 and commented that the chateau was "bien troussé" ("well fitted-out"), perhaps suggesting the origin of the name Château de la Trousse. The King bestowed the title of Marquis on the le Hardy family in 1651.

The château was renovated and improved during the 1680s when the then owner, Marquis Phillipe-August le Hardy, employed the services of the famous architect Liberal Bruant, the architect of the Hotel des Invalides in Paris.

In 1684, their only child, Marie-Henriette le Hardy, married a Piedmontese prince, Amedeo Adolfo dal Pozzo, Marchese di Voghera.

Phillipe-August le Hardy died in 1691 and Amedeo and Marie-Henriette dal Pozzo inherited the estate. Their granddaughter subsequently inherited and sold the estate in 1791 to a new family, Charles-Guillaume Baudon, the Comte de Mony Colchen.

The estate fell into disrepair during the French Revolution. In 1814, the Napoleonic army set fire to the orangery as a signal about the approaching Cossacks. In 1829, the owners allowed speculators to sell the building materials to raise much needed cash.

== New château ==
In 1865, the grandson of the 1791 buyer, Count Charles-Victor Baudon de Mony-Colchen, completed the construction of the new château that stands today. He also arranged the renovation of the original orangery and stable courtyard (that date from 1630), and the new gardens.

During the latter part of the First World War, US troops were garrisoned at the château in conjunction with the battles at Château Thierry and Belleau Wood. When the war ended, the Count erected the war memorial at the entrance to the château on the D401, in gratitude that his son had survived.

During the Second World War, La Trousse was commandeered by the Germans and the attics of the courtyard were used as a field hospital. Allied troops advanced from Normandy and reached La Trousse on August 24, 1944. A tank battle ensued and a German tank was hit on the driveway. Fighting ceased the following day when Paris was liberated on August 25, 1944.

The château stayed in the ownership of the Baudon family until 1998 when Count Xavier Baudon de Mony sold the estate to a Dutch owner, Hans Musegaas. The de Mony family could not afford the rising costs of upkeep and the children decided they could not take on the responsibilities. The château and buildings have since been renovated and divided into a number of private apartments. The co-owners take joint responsibility for the upkeep and improvements to the château and its 40-acre estate.

Notable features at Château de la Trousse include the chapel, the prison and pigeonry.People live here now.
