= Chenecey-Buillon =

- Commune
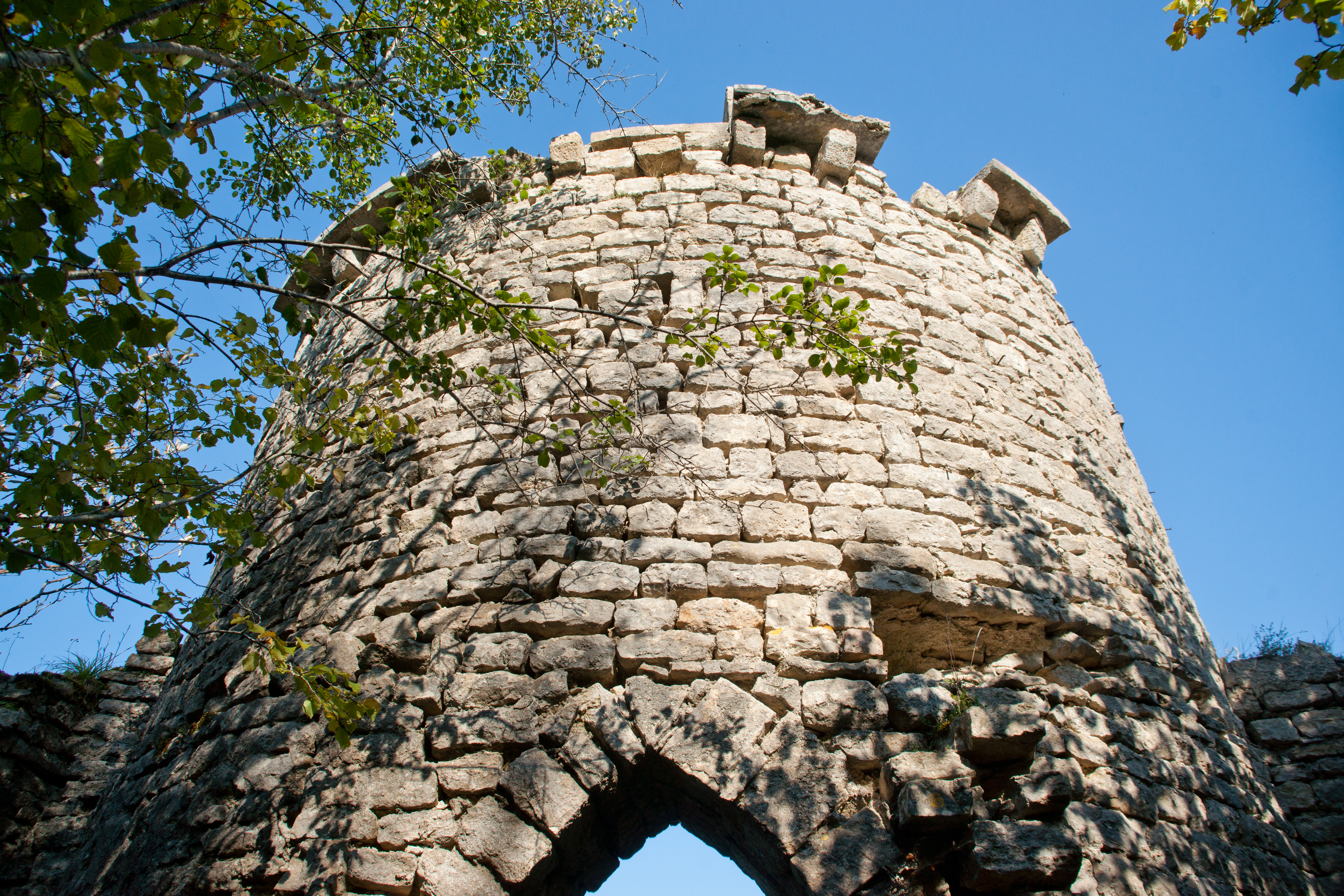
- Chateau of Charencey
- Location of Chenecey-Buillon
- Location within France Location within Bourgogne-Franche-Comté
- Coordinates: 47°08′27″N 5°57′36″E
- Country: France
- Region: Bourgogne-Franche-Comté
- Department: Doubs
- Arrondissement: Besançon
- Canton: Saint-Vit
- Intercommunality: Loue-Lison

Government
  - Mayor (2020–2026): Laurence Breuillot
- Area^{1}: 16.58 km^{2} (6.40 sq mi)
- Highest elevation: 491 m (1,611 ft)
- Lowest elevation: 266 m (873 ft)
- Population (2023): 491
  - Density: 29.6/km^{2} (76.7/sq mi)
- Time zone: UTC+01:00 (CET)
  - Summer (DST): UTC+02:00 (CEST)
- INSEE/Postal code: 25149 /25440
- ^{1} French Land Register data, which excludes lakes, ponds, glaciers > 1 km^{2} (0.386 sq mi or 247 acres) and river estuaries.

Chenecey-Buillon (French pronunciation: [ʃənsɛ bɥijɔ̃]) is a commune in the Doubs department in the Bourgogne-Franche-Comté region in eastern France.

== Population ==
Historical population
Year	Pop.	±% p.a.
1968	333	—
1975	388	+2.21%
1982	462	+2.53%
1990	445	−0.47%
1999	488	+1.03%
2007	544	+1.37%
2012	550	+0.22%
2017	515	−1.31%
2023	491	−0.79%
Source: INSEE

== See also ==
- Communes of the Doubs department
