= Odo I, Viscount of Porhoët =

Odo I of Porhoët was viscount of Rennes and Porhoët from 1074 to his death, after 1092.

Odo I was the eldest son and heir of Josselin I of Porhoët. Contrary to his father, he seldom appeared at the court of Duke Conan III, Duke of Brittany. During the reign of Conan’s brother-in-law and heir Hoël of Cornouailles, he even joined several lords who had rebelled against the duke in 1068.

He married firstly Anne, or Emma, de Léon, who died in 1092. She was the aunt of Guihomar II, Viscount of Léon. They had five children:

- Josselin II Viscount of Rennes and Porhoët
- Geoffrey Viscount of Porhoët
- Guethenoc of Porhoët (died before 1114)
- a daughter who married Simon II, Baron of La Roche-Bernard
- Alan I of Rohan, 1st Viscount of Rohan in 1127

After Emma’s death, Odo married again. The name of his second wife is unknown. They had two sons:

- Bernard of Porhoët
- Robert of Porhoët

== Sources ==
- Abbé Piéderrière, vicar of La Trinité-Porhoët Essai sur la généalogie des comtes de Porhoët. Bulletin de la Société polymathique du Morbihan, 1872, pages 234-241.
- Hubert Guillotel, De la vicomté de Rennes à la vicomté de Porhoët (fin du Xème siècle - milieu du XIIème siècle), MSHAB, 1995, wol. LXXIII, pages 5–30
- Pierre-Hyacinthe Morice, Mémoires pour servir de preuves à l'histoire ecclésiastique et civile de Bretagne, 1742-1746
