= List of presidents of Brittany =

Politics of Brittany

This is the list of presidents of Brittany since 1974. Regional legislatures are directly elected since 1986.

Presidents of Brittany
President	Party	Term
René Pleven	DC	1974–1976
André Colin	CDS	1976–1978
Raymond Marcellin	UDF-PR	1978–1986
Yvon Bourges	RPR	1986–1998
Josselin de Rohan	RPR/UMP	1998–2004
Jean-Yves Le Drian	PS	2004–
