= Cesare Nembrini Pironi Gonzaga =

Italian Catholic cardinal (1768–1837)

His Eminence Cesare Nembrini Pironi Gonzaga
- Bishop of Ancona e Numana
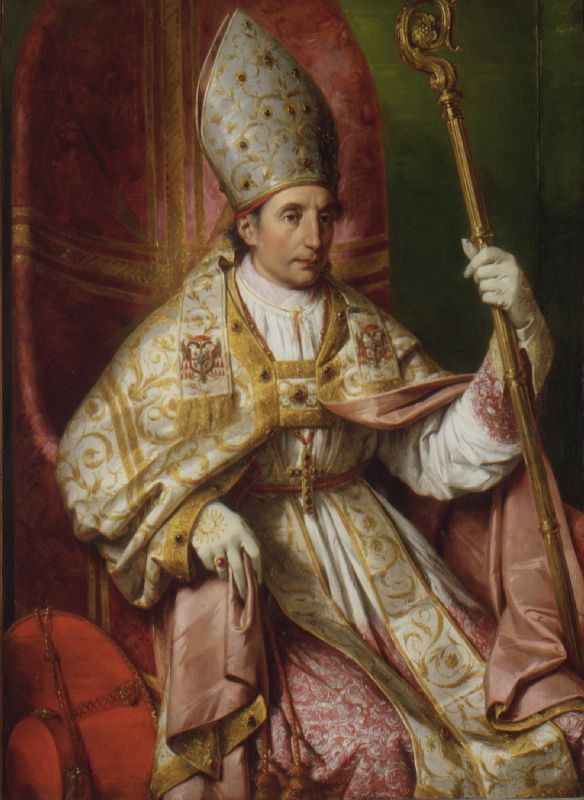
- Painting of Nembrini Pironi Gonzaga by Francesco Podesti
- Church: Catholic Church
- Diocese: Ancona e Numana
- Appointed: 24 May 1824
- Term ended: 5 December 1837
- Predecessor: Gianfrancesco Falzacappa
- Successor: Antonio Maria Cadolini
- Other post: Cardinal-Priest of Sant'Anastasia (1829–1837)

Orders
- Ordination: 5 June 1803
- Consecration: 7 June 1824 by Pietro Francesco Galleffi
- Created cardinal: 27 July 1829 by Pope Pius VIII

Personal details
- Born: 27 November 1768 Ancona, Papal States
- Died: 5 December 1837 (aged 69)
- Education: University of Bologna (JUD); Pontifical Academy of Ecclesiastical Nobles

Cesare Nembrini Pironi Gonzaga (27 November 1768 – 5 December 1837) was an Italian Catholic prelate who served as bishop of the Diocese of Ancona e Numana from 1824 to his death in 1837.
