= Louis Marie, Duke of Rohan =

Louis
- Duke of Rohan
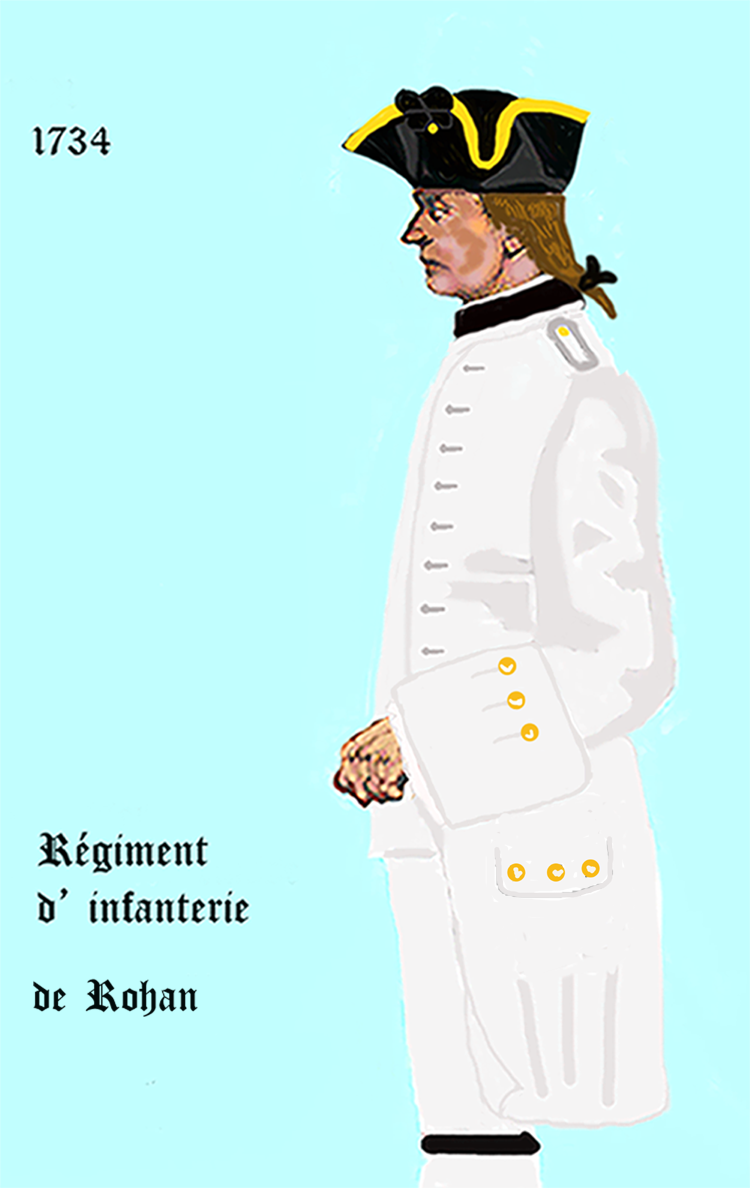
- Born: 17 January 1710; Paris, France
- Died: 28 November 1791 (aged 81); Nice, France
- Spouse: Olympe de Châtillon (m. 1735; died 1753) Charlotte de Crussol d'Uzès (m. 1758; died 1791)
Names
- Louis Marie Bretagne Dominique de Rohan-Chabot
- House: Rohan
- Father: Louis Bretagne Alain de Rohan-Chabot
- Mother: Françoise de Roquelaure

Louis Marie Bretagne Dominique de Rohan-Chabot, 5th Duke of Rohan, Roquelaure and Lude (English: /ˈroʊən ʃæˈboʊ/ ROH-ən-sha-BOH, French: [lwi maʁi də ʁɔɑ̃ ʃabo]; 17 January 1710 – 28 November 1791), was a French aristocrat and soldier.

== Early life ==
Rohan-Chabot was born on 17 January 1710 in Paris. He was the eldest son, and heir, of Louis Bretagne Alain de Rohan-Chabot and Françoise de Roquelaure. Among his younger siblings were Louise Armande Julie de Rohan-Chabot (wife of Daniel François de Gelas de Voisin, Count of Lautrec), Louis François de Rohan-Chabot (Abbot of Saint-Sauveur-le-Vicomte), Marie Armande de Rohan-Chabot (Prioress of Our Lady of Good Help), Charlotte Félicité de Rohan-Chabot (wife of José Diego Gutiérrez de los Ríos, Count of Fernán Núñez), Louis Auguste de Rohan-Chabot (who later became Viscount of Chabot in 1751, and 8th Count of Jarnac).

== Career ==
Lieutenant General of the King's Armies (French: Lieutenant Général des armées), he was confirmed, as were his descendants, by King Louis XV in his right to be treated as "cousin of the king".

He was perhaps the most popular of the Lords of Blain. Affected in his prestige by the Affair of the Queen's Necklace, saddened by the ruin of a Rohan, Jules, Prince of Guéméné, who by his prodigality had made a bankruptcy of 33 million, he had retired to his estate in Nice.

== Personal life ==
In 1735, he married Olympe de Châtillon (1719–1753), only daughter of the Duke of Châtillon, Governor of the Dauphin. Before her death, they were the parents of:

- Marie-Rosalie de Rohan-Chabot (1741–174), who died young.
- Catherine-Sophie de Rohan-Chabot (1743–1757), who died young.
- Louis-Bretagne-Charles de Rohan-Chabot (1747–1757), who died young.

In 1758, he married, for the second time, to Charlotte de Crussol d'Uzès (1732–1791), only daughter of Charles Emmanuel de Crussol, 8th Duke of Uzès and Émilie de La Rochefoucauld (the daughter of François de La Rochefoucauld, 4th Duke of La Rochefoucauld). Charlotte was a friend of Marie-Thérèse, Marquise de La Ferté-Imbault.

The duke died in exile in Nice on 28 November 1791. As all of his children predeceased him, his heir was his cousin Louis-Antoine de Rohan-Chabot.

French nobility
Preceded by Louis Bretagne Alain de Rohan-Chabot	Duke of Rohan; 1738–1791	Succeeded by Louis Antoine de Rohan-Chabot
