= Jacques de Clermont-d'Amboise =

Jacques de Clermont d'Amboise (c.1525 – 1587) was the third son of Louis de Clermont, Lord of Gallerande, butler of the king, and Renée d'Amboise.

== Titles ==
Georges d'Amboise, Cardinal of Rouen, protector of Jean d'Amboise gave him the lands of Bussy and Saxe-Fontaine on condition that the family use the name and arms of the house of Amboise; thus, the name Clermont-Amboise was adopted.

Jacques held numerous titles including Baron de Bussy, Bussy le Chateau, Cuperly, Ban de Bussy, Courtisols, Vanault le Chatel, Vavray the Great, the Little Vavray, Maurupt, Pargny, Cheppes, Cernon, Vernancourt, Vésigneul sur Coole, and Fontaine sur Coole.

== Military career ==
Jacques was captain of a company of lances for Francis I of France and was made a Knight of the Order of St Michael.

== Family ==
On 26 June 1550 he married Catherine de Beauvau, lady of Moineville or Mognéville, and they had six children:

- Renée, Princess of Cambray (1546-9 October 1595), married in 1579 to Jean de Montluc, Marshal of France, the intimate friend of the brave Louis de Bussy d'Amboise
- Margaret, married April 6, 1583 Olivier de Chastellux, Baron and Viscount de Chastellux of Avallon. She a friend of François d'Amboise lawyer and master of requests of the king (son of Jean d'Amboise)
- Françoise
- Louis (b.1549), called "le Brave Bussy", a page to Charles IX of France at the age of 12. He accompanied his cousin Francis (son of Jean d'Amboise), King Henry III, in Poland.
- Hubert, who died at the siege of Issoire in 1577.
- George, Lord of Mognéville (d.1586), a Huguenot, he married Lucrèce Castel san Nazare.

He married secondly, Jeanne de Romecourt, niece of the governor of Saxe-Fontaine, by whom he had one daughter:

- Renée II, married to Jean de la Fontaine of Ognon, Baron Mussignan.

== Sources ==
- Father Anselm
- Testament of Cardinal Georges d'Amboise II in the departmental archives of Rouen
- J. Balteau, Dictionary of Biography
