= Alan I, Viscount of Rohan =

French nobleman (1084–1147)

(Former) arms of the Viscounts of Rohan: gules, seven mascles or.

Alan I of Rohan (1084–1147), also known as Alain le Noir, was the 1st Viscount de Rohan and Viscount of Castelnoec. He was the third son of Odo I, Viscount of Porhoët, and Emma de Léon.

== Life ==
He received as his inheritance, the sparsely populated western Porhoët, in 1116. He also owned a castle at Castennec and constructed another on the shores of the Oust which he named Rohan, the name he passed on to his descendants. In 1128, Alain de Rohan finished constructing his permanent residences and founded the Priory de la Coarde at Castennec for the monks at Redon Abbey, and a priory for Marmoutier Abbey near the château de Rohan.

== Children ==
Alan I married a woman named Villana. They had two children:

- Alan II, 2nd Viscount de Rohan,
- Josselin

== See also ==
- House of Rohan
