= Porhoët =

Franco-Breton House of Rohan

The noble Breton family line of Porhoët (French pronunciation: [pɔʁwɛt]) was a French noble family in the middle ages, from around 990 through the 1200's. Notable members included Odo I, Odo II, and Alan I. Alan I would go on to form the Franco-Breton House of Rohan, which survives to the modern day.

== History ==
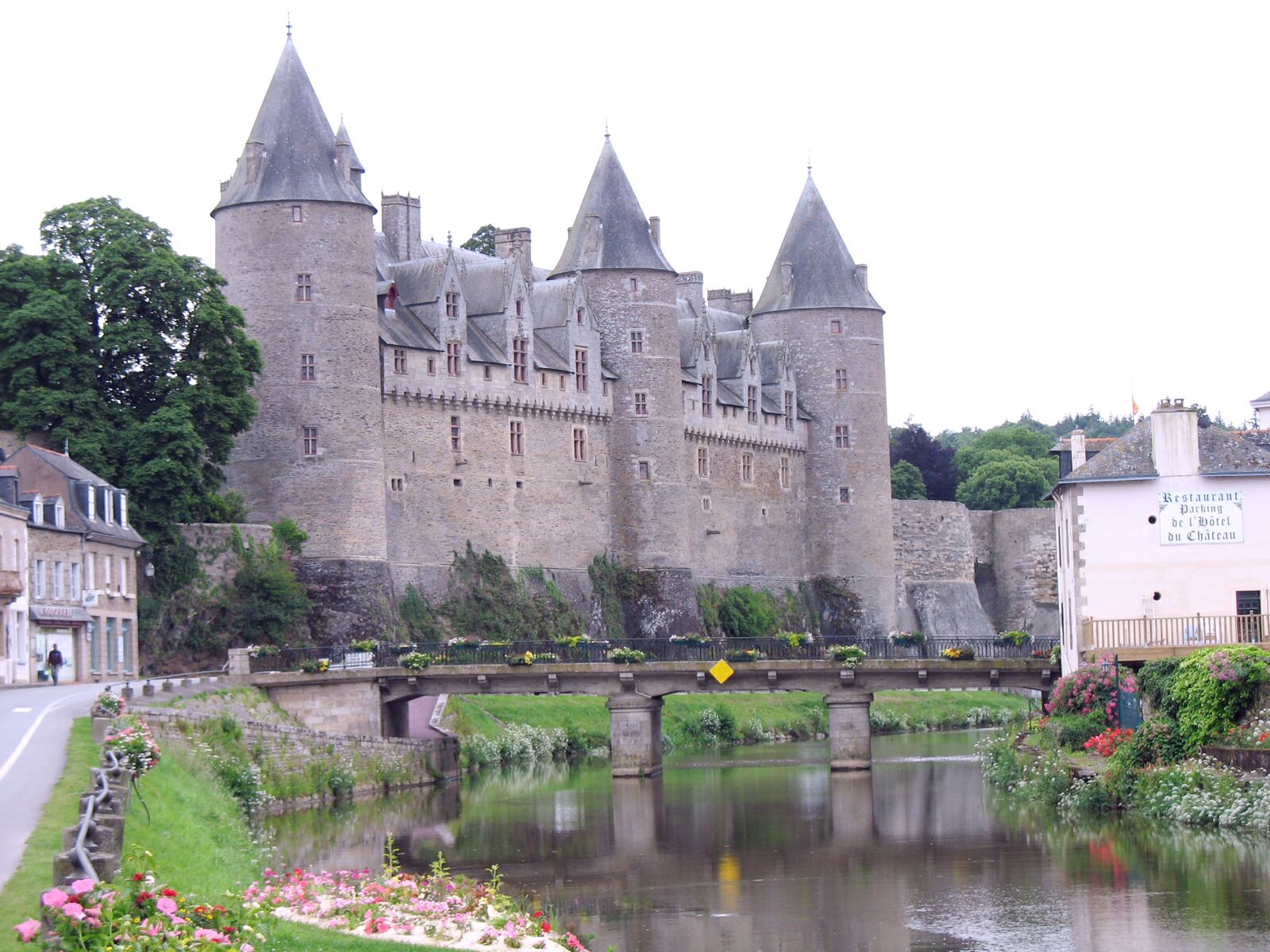
Josselin Castle and the River Oust

The first recognised Vicomte de Porhoët was Guithenoc (c. 990–1040CE), was born in Guilliers. He married Allurum (994–?) of Guilliers. He became Vicomte, and in about 1008 he moved to La Trinite, in Porhoet. Both Guilliers and Porhoet are located in the modern day French departement of Morbihan in the province of Brittany.

In Porhoët Guithenoc built Josselin Castle, which he named for his son, Josselin (1020–1074). It is still owned by the descendants of Porhoët and is the longest continuously held private estate in the world.

Vicomte Josselin de Porhoët had three sons with the surname Rohan: Mainguy De Rohan, Jostho de Rohan, and Roger de Rohan. He had a fourth son, the third vicomte de Porhoët, Odo I, Viscount of Porhoët (1049–?).

Odo I married Anne de Leon (1065–?). They had two children, Vicomte Geoffrey de Porhoët (1092–1141) and Alan I, Viscount of Rohan.

Geoffrey is said to have married Hawisa Fergant of Brittany (abt. 1105–?). They had two sons, one of which was Odo II, Viscount of Porhoët (1122-?).

The title Count of Porhoët was joined to the Breton Ducal crown. Pierre Mauclerc bestowed the title on his daughter Yolande; upon her death the title was rejoined to the Duchy by her brother John I.

== Franco-Breton House of Rohan ==
Alain le Noir was the 1st Viscount de Rohan. He was the third son of Eudes I de Porhoët and his wife Emma de Léon (the daughter of Guihomar II, Viscount of Léon). The name Rohan comes from the name of the castle he built, and passed on to his descendants, on the shores of the Oust.

== Viscount of Porhoët as Duke of Brittany ==
Eudes II of Porhoët, also known as Odo II, is a notable figure in the history of the Duchy of Brittany.

Odo II married into the ruling duchy of Brittany though his first marriage to Bertha (b.1114–?). This was Bertha's second marriage. She was the daughter of Conan III, Duke of Brittany. Upon Bertha's death, Odo II served as Regent to Bertha's son Conan IV of Penthièvre. Bertha and Odo II had three children permitting the Porhoët line to continue.

Bertha's sister Constance (1118–?) was next in line to the duchy (after Bertha); she married Alan, younger brother to Odo II, thus cementing Porhoët claims to Brittany.

When Bertha died, Odo II tried to deny Conan IV his inheritance and usurp the rule of Brittany. He formed an alliance with Hoel, Count of Nantes, Conan III's disinherited son. (Note: In order to consolidate his power, King Henry II of England (5 March 1133- 6 July 1189) had planned to replace Duke Conan III of Brittany with someone from his immediate family. He had promised his younger brother Geoffrey, of the house of Plantagenet, this duchy if he succeeded to the throne of England. To this end, he had Conan III disinherit his son Hoel III, claiming him as illegitimate. (Hoel III's mother, the Duchess, Maude, was an illegitimate daughter to Henry I of England). This meant that Bertha, who was the next in line to the duchy of Brittany, became the legitimate heir to the estate of Conan III.) In order to counter Odo II, Henry II of England invaded Brittany. (Note: Henry II faced anarchy on many fronts; he was in the midst of the "Nineteen Year Winter." His younger brother Geoffrey, to whom he had promised the duchy, also contested the throne. As a result of the invasion of Brittany, the Porhoët family eventually recognised Henry II as King.) In 1156 Odo was deposed by his step son and imprisoned by Conan IV's ally Raoul de Fougères. Henry II razed Josselin Castle.

Odo II had a second marriage with Jeanne/Eléonore de Léon, daughter of Guiomar III, Vicomte de Léon. Their son became Odo III.

== The Viscounts and Counts of Porhoët ==
- Guithenoc (990–1040), becomes Viscount.
  - Josselin (1025–1074), son of Guithenoc.
    - Odo I, Viscount of Porhoët (1049–1092), son of Josselin.
      - Geoffrey (1082–1141), son of Odo I.
        - Odo II, Viscount of Porhoët (1122–1170), son of Geoffrey, married Bertha and so became son-in-law of Conan III, Duke of Brittany; contested the Ducal Crown of Brittany.
          - Odo III (1160–1239), son of Odo II; he was made Count of Porhoët.

== Also of note ==
Alan de Porhoët, son of Odo I, was created Viscount of Rohan and was the founder of the House of Rohan.

Alan de Porhoët, younger brother of Odo II, left for England and became Alan la Zouche, great-grandfather of two English Barons and great-great-grandfather of a third - see Baron Zouche.
