= Alexandrine Charlotte de Rohan-Chabot =

French duchess

Rosalie,
- Duchess of La Rochefoucauld
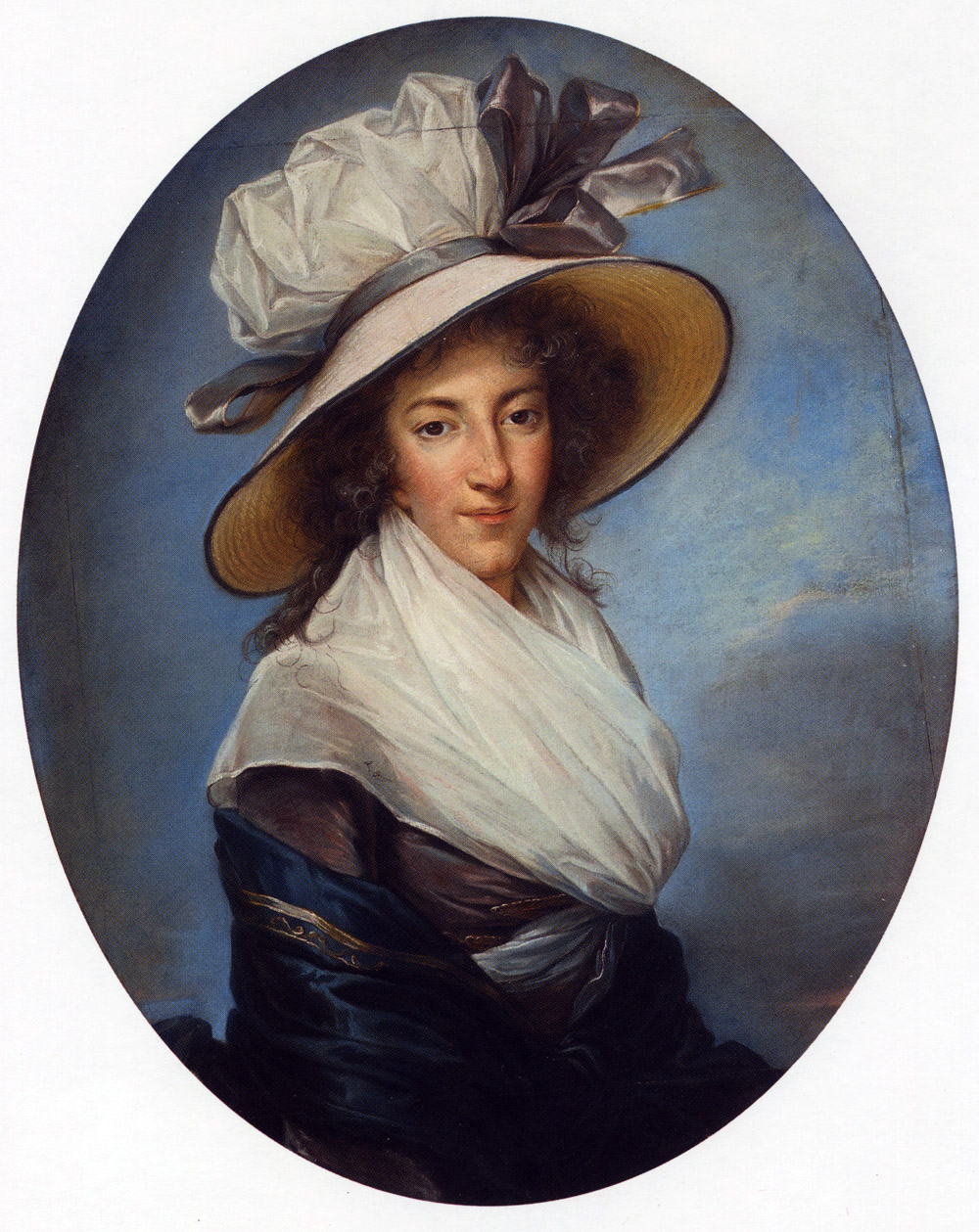
- Alexandrine Charlotte de Rohan-Chabot, 1789, by Elisabeth Vigée-Lebrun
- Full name: Alexandrine Charlotte de Rohan-Chabot
- Born: 1763
- Died: 1839 (aged 75–76)
- Spouses: Louis Alexandre de La Rochefoucauld d'Enville, Boniface Louis Andre, Marquis of Castellane
- Father: Louis Antoine de Rohan-Chabot, Duke of Chabot, 6th Duke of Rohan
- Mother: Élisabeth Louise de La Rochefoucauld

Alexandrine Charlotte "Rosalie" de Rohan-Chabot (1763–1839), the duchess of La Rochefoucauld was a French duchess and letter writer, known for the events of her life during the French Revolution.

She witnessed the infamous Reign of Terror at firsthand, including the assassination of her husband (and uncle) the Duc de La Rochefoucauld in Gisors during the September Massacres (they had married in 1780 and the marriage was childless) and the execution of her brother. In 1810 she remarried by wedding her relative, Boniface Louis Andre, Marquis de Castellane.

She was also the lover of U.S. ambassador William Short, the "adoptive son" of Thomas Jefferson. Their love affair was recorded in hundreds of letters, which document the lovers' pains of separation and their frustration with social norms. The letters offer personal insights into a turbulent era of world history.
