= Château de Gerbéviller =

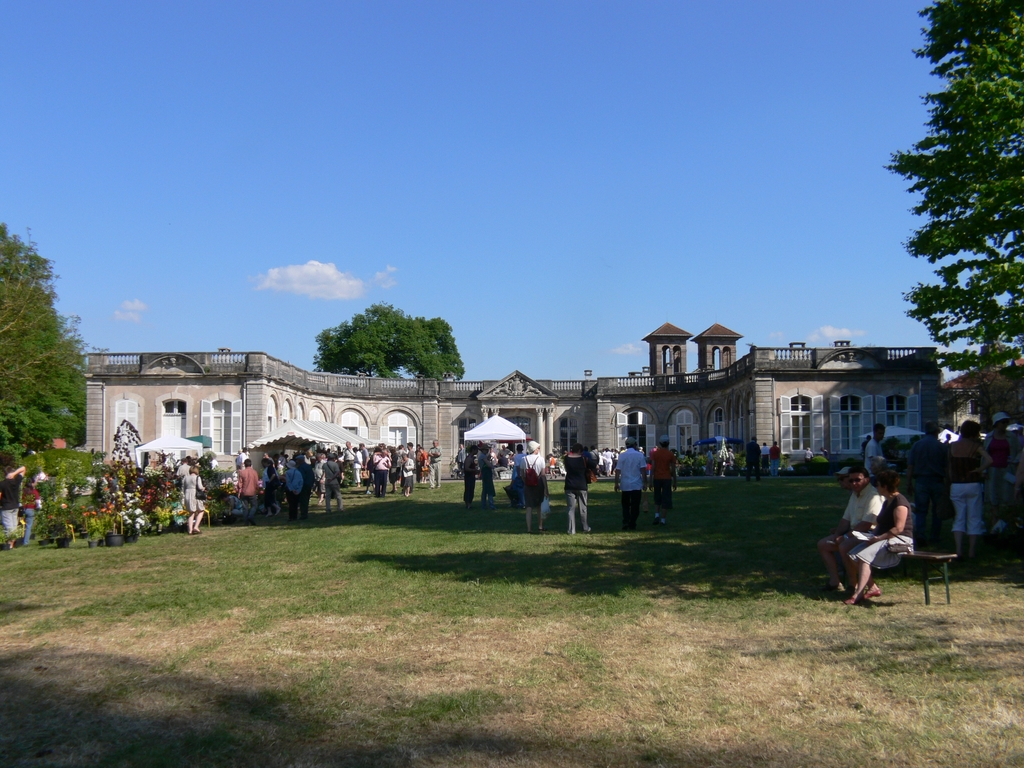
- Château de Gerbéviller, May 2008, Garden show

- Location within France

General information
- Type: Château
- Architectural style: Classical
- Location: Gerbéviller, Meurthe-et-Moselle, Lorraine, France
- Coordinates: 48.496902°N 6.509013°E
- Construction started: 17th century

Design and construction
- Architect: Albert Laprade
- Designations: Historical monument Remarkable garden

Website
- www.chateau-gerbeviller.com

The Château de Gerbéviller is a chateau in the small community of Gerbéviller in Lorraine, France. The site has been occupied since at least the 12th century. The present buildings date from the 17th to 19th centuries, and include the chateau, a theater, a chapel, a pavilion and a unique water nymphaeum. The chateau and chapel were badly damaged during World War I, but have been repaired. They have been protected under various designations since 1945, and since February 1996 have had an overall designation as a historical monument. The park of the chateau with its views over the valley of Mortagne has been a classified natural site since 1999.

== Owners ==
There are records of Gerbéviller from 1179, when the Simon II, Duke of Lorraine gave the castle and estate of "Gilbert-Viller" to his son Frideric or Ferri de Bitche. He in turn passed it to his fourth son Philippe (died 1243). Later it passed to the house of Wisse, who held it for a long time. The estate then passed to the house of Deuilly and Chatelet, by the marriage of Hue du Chatelet with Madeleine Wisse de Gerbéviller.

Pierre du Châtelet, their son, became counselor of state to Antoine, Duke of Lorraine, in 1521. He was the seneschal of the Duke of Lorraine and head of his council in 1530. He was made bailey of Nancy in 1541, and in 1543 represented the duke at the conference of Pont-à-Mousson concerned with the introduction of Lutheranism in Metz. He took a firm stand, and protected Catholic interests. He died in 1556 and was buried in the church of Saint-Jean-Baptiste in Gerbéviller.

In 1589 Anne du Chatelet inherited the property. She married the count of Tornielle. In 1621 Charles Joseph de Tornielle was made Marquis de Gerbéviller. The Tornielle family became extinct in 1737 with the death of Anne-Joseph, grand chamberlain of Duke Leopold. He had no children by Antoinette-Louise de Lambertye, and granted his title and estates to Camille de Lambertye. Prince and Duke Armand-Louis-Hélie d'Arenberg (born 14 April 1904) married Gabreille de Lambertye-Gerbeviller on 9 August 1941. As of 2010 the chateau was owned by the Arenbergs.

== Château ==
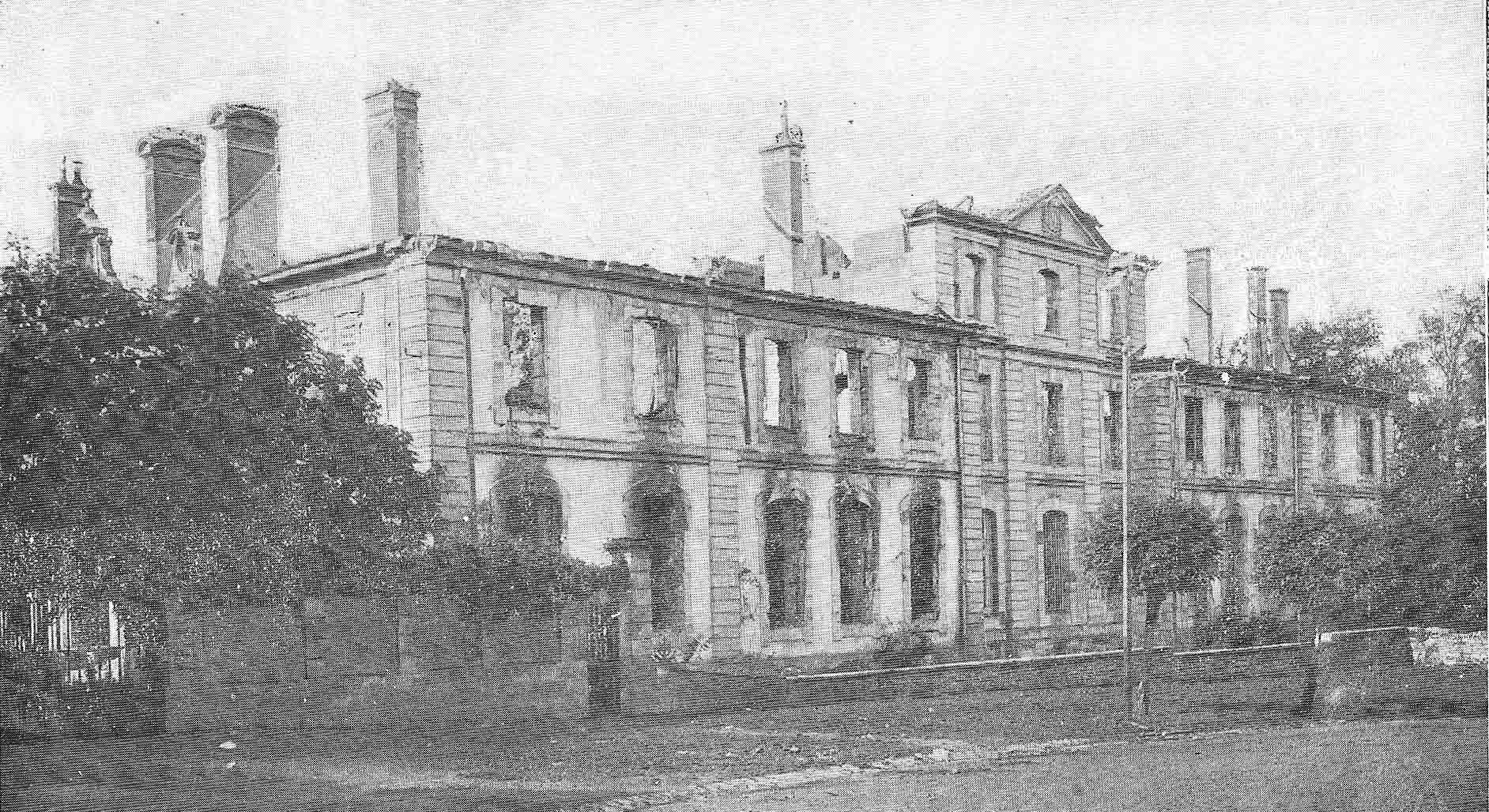
The chateau in ruins in 1915

The town was destroyed by Charles the Bold, Duke of Burgundy (1433–1477). It was destroyed again by Louis XIII (1601–1643), who razed the walls, fortified gates and the castle.

The present chateau was built by Camille de Lambertye-Gerbéviller during the reign of Louis XV (1710–1774). It was built sometime before 1750 by Germain Boffrand. During World War I it was partially destroyed by bombing on 24 August 1914.

The architect Albert Laprade rebuilt the chateau for Charles de Lambertye-Gerbéviller in 1920. Outbuildings include a theater from the second half of the 19th century. In February 1996 the chateau and outbuildings were designated a historical monument.

== Chapel ==
The Palatine Chapel, opposite the castle outside the domain, has changed considerably over the centuries. There are records of a chapel in 1050, when the house of Lorraine rebuilt part of the choir. Around 1326 Jen Wisse built a nave and the sepulchral chapel that forms today's choir. It holds the tombs of the lords of Gerbéviller. It was enlarged in the 15th century, and used as a parish church. The chapel was again enlarged in the 17th century. Christine Claude du Châtelet gave it to the Carmelites in 1618. The chapel and Carmelite convent were sold as national property during the Revolution.

The Marquis Ernest de Lambertye (1789-1862) redesigned the chapel almost entirely, thinking of offering it as an asylum for Pope Pius IX, who was in danger of being driven from his Papal States at the time of the unification of the Kingdom of Italy.

The chapel suffered from the bombing of 24 August 1914. Between 1920 and 1923 the two towers and the entrance to the sacristry were restored.

== Park ==
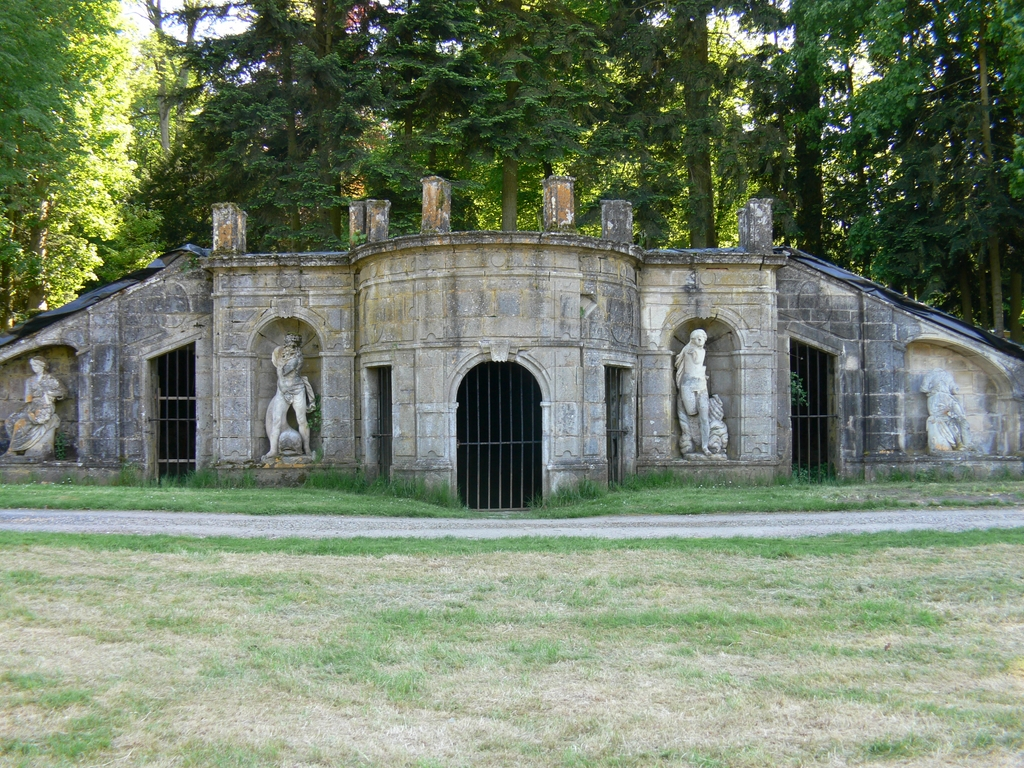
The nymphaeum

The park was originally created around 1620 for Charles-Emmanuel de Tornielle, with a red-brick pavilion and a nymphaeum. The red pavilion also dates to 1620 and was built by Clément Métezeau, the architect of the Place des Vosges in Paris. The nymphaeum consists of three rooms embedded in a dip in the ground, reached by a stairway of two flights. It provides a passage between the upper and lower parts of the park. The rooms are richly decorated with mosaics of shells and colored pebbles. Jets of water flow in basins and spring from the ground. It is the only water nymphaeum in France. As of 2012 the Nymphaeum was benefiting from a campaign for full restoration to its original appearance.

The landscaped park was redesigned in the English style around 1815 by Louis-Martin Berthault, the architect of the Empress Josephine, for whom he had designed the parks of Malmaison and Compiègne. The park is denoted a historic monument and a protected natural site. It covers 16 hectares (40 acres) of alternating meadows and stands of tall trees, and is crossed by the river Mortagne. There is a rose garden, a 19th-century garden divided in "rooms" separated by walls, and a "1900 garden" inspired by the École de Nancy.
