= Gábor Városi =

Hungarian visual artist (born 1965)

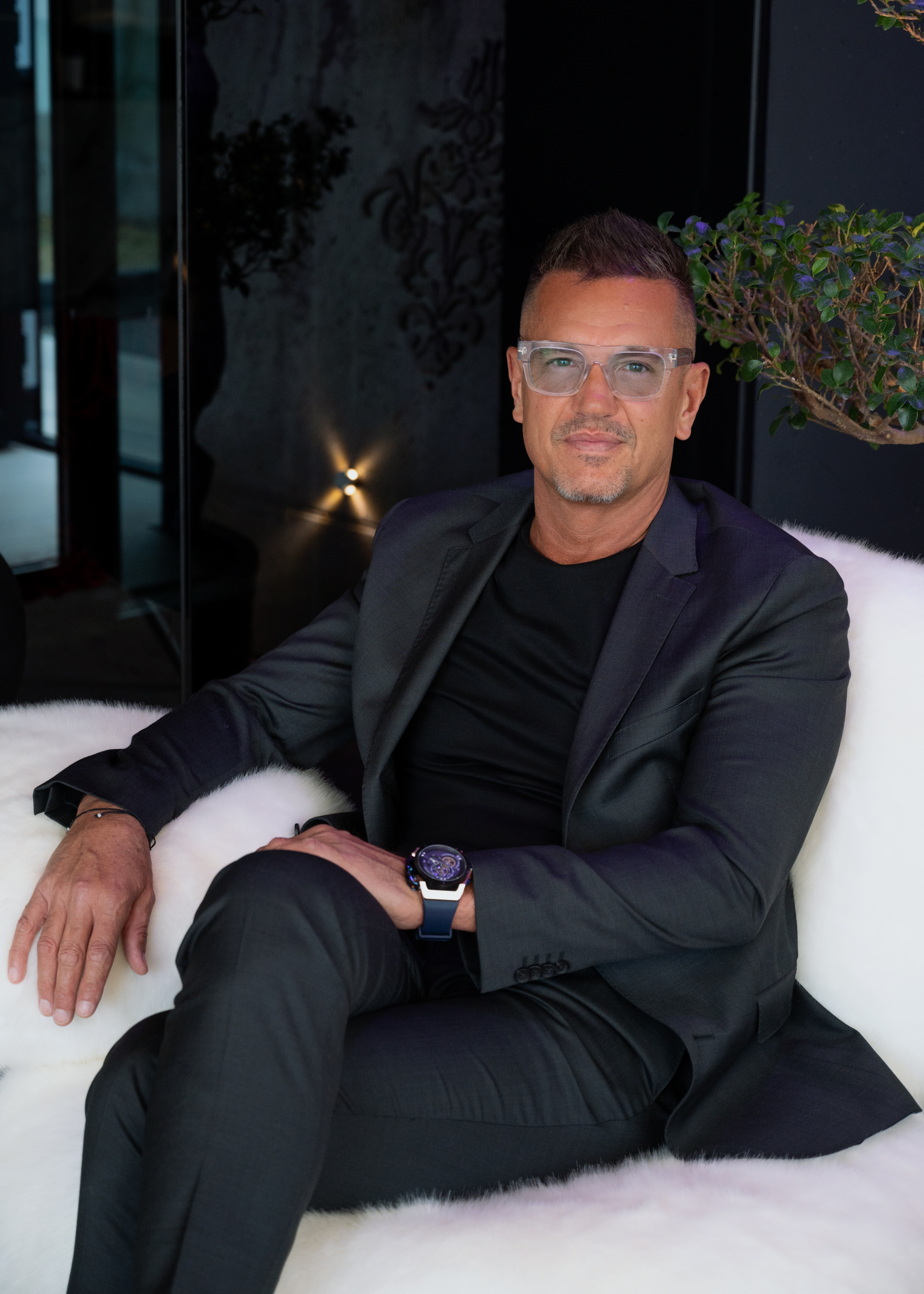
- Born: December 10, 1965
- Education: Hungarian Academy of Fine Arts, painting, master course, Budapest
- Known for: artist, painter, sculptor, architect, teacher
- Spouse(s): Eszter Városi (2015–2020), Dr. Fáta Városi-Izrael (2024-)
- Children: Villő Városi (2007-), Róza Mira Városi (2016-)
- Parent(s): László Városi (1928–2011) military officer and Anna Jeges (1936–2012) journalist
- Family: Dr. László Városi (1961–2019)
- Website: www.varosigabor.com

Gábor Városi (born December 10, 1965) is a Hungarian painter, architect, and visual artist known for his multidisciplinary approach to art. His work integrates painting, sculpture, and architectural elements and has been exhibited internationally. His work has been exhibited internationally. He is considered a prominent figure in contemporary Hungarian art. He also authored the book VarosiBook, which features his own projects.

== Early life and education ==
Városi was born in Budapest, Hungary, on December 10, 1965. Városi Gábor attended the Secondary School of Visual Arts from 1980 to 1984, where he studied under Zoltán Tölg-Molnár and István Gábor. He received the Domanovszky Award and the March 15 Concept Award as recognition of his work.

He continued his education at the Hungarian University of Fine Arts from 1985 to 1989, studying under Ignác Kokas and Gábor Dienes. After completing his education, he worked under the influence of prominent Hungarian artists, including Victor Vasarely, whose teachings had a lasting effect on his artistic style. In 1987, he was awarded the Layota Art Scholarship, which provided him the opportunity to study in Sweden and exhibit his work internationally.

== Career ==
Városi's artistic journey began in the late 1980s, and he quickly gained recognition for his distinctive style. His paintings are characterized by their vivid use of color, energetic brushwork, and a blend of figurative and abstract elements.

In addition to his painting career, Városi has designed and built the "Költő Kert" villa park in Budapest, an exclusive residential complex with unique architectural elements that reflect his artistic vision, the Shambala House on Gereben Street in District 12, and he has created a villa park befitting Beverly Hills.

In 2020, Városi completed the Poet's Garden project, featuring 12 apartments, approximately 50 glass sculptures, and around a dozen tranquil Japanese gardens integrated throughout. The glass works showcase Városi's distinctive approach—merging geometric abstraction with organic compositions that incorporate human elements like faces.

== Artistic style ==
The Hungarian modernist tradition and the kinetic art movement strongly influence Városi's artistic style. His work often explores themes of urban life, movement, and human emotion, rendered in a palette that ranges from soft pastels to intense, saturated colours.

== Personal life ==
Városi is known for his unique lifestyle, which combines his passion for art with luxury property development. He divides his time between his villa in Budapest and his studio, where he continues to produce new work.

== Exhibitions ==
In 1987, Városi's first solo exhibition was introduced by Victor Vasarely at the Galerie de La Rochefoucauld in Paris. His international acclaim was further solidified by winning first prize at the Museum of Modern Art competition in Belgium.

Városi has had several solo and group exhibitions throughout his career:

- 2018: Contemporary Art Fair, New York
- 2015: Art Vienna, Vienna

== Publications ==
Városi is the author of VarsoiBook which serves as both a portfolio of Városi's work and an exploration of his artistic vision, presenting detailed visuals and descriptions of his major projects.

== Select public works ==
- 2008 - Shambala Home, Budapest, Hungary
- 2013 - Art Home, Budapest, Hungary
- 2016 - Museum of Ethnography, Budapest, Hungary (Artistic Director)
- 2020 - Poet's Garden, Budapest, Hungary
