= Jean Hérault, Baron of Gourville =

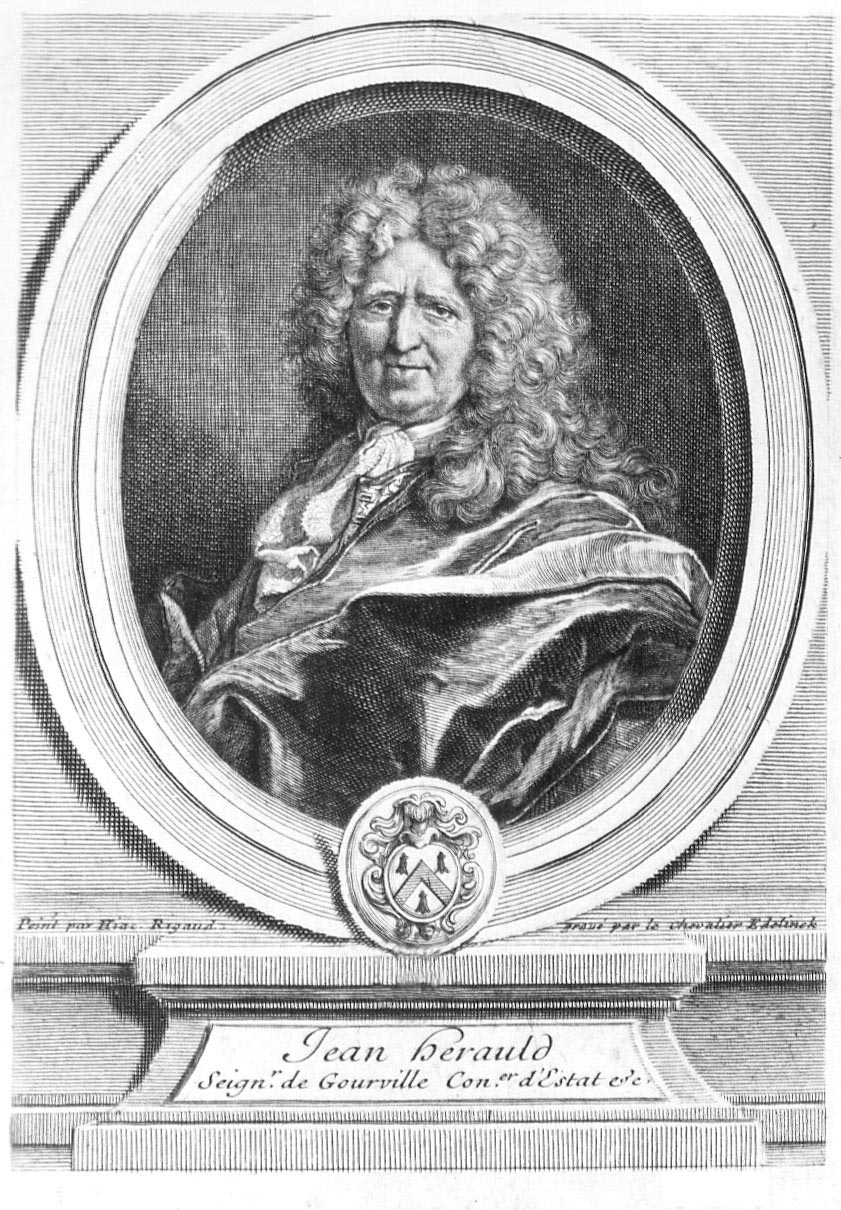
- Jean Hérault de Gourville par Gérard Edelinck d’après Hyacinthe Rigaud
- Born: July 10, 1625; La Rochefoucauld, Charente, France
- Died: June 14, 1703 (aged 77); Paris, France
- Occupations: adventurer, aristocrat
- Writing career
- Notable work: Mémoires de Gourville

Jean Hérault, Baron of Gourville (July 10, 1625 – June 14, 1703) was a French adventurer and aristocrat.

He was born in La Rochefoucauld, in today's Charente département. At the age of eighteen he entered the house of La Rochefoucauld as a servant, and in 1646 became secretary to François de La Rochefoucauld, author of the Maximes. Resourceful and quick-witted, he rendered services to his master during the Fronde, in his intrigues with the parliament, the court or the princes. In these negotiations he made the acquaintance of Condé, whom he wished to help to escape from the château of Vincennes; of Mazarin, for whom he negotiated the reconciliation with the princes; and of Nicolas Fouquet.

After the Fronde he engaged in financial affairs, thanks to Fouquet. In 1658 he farmed the taille in Guienne. He bought depreciated rentes and had them raised to their nominal value by the treasury; he extorted gifts from the financiers for his protection, being Fouquet's confidant in many operations of which he shared the profits. In three years he accumulated an enormous fortune, still further increased by his unfailing good fortune at cards, playing even with the king. He was involved in the trial of Fouquet, and in April 1663 was condemned to death for peculation and embezzlement of public funds; but escaping, was executed in effigy. He sent a valet one night to take the effigy down from the gallows in the court of the Palais de Justice, and then fled the country.

He remained five years abroad, being excepted in 1665 from the amnesty accorded by Louis XIV to the condemned financiers. Having returned secretly to France, he entered the service of Condé, who, unable to meet his creditors, had need of a clever manager to put his affairs in order. In this way he was able to reappear at court, to assist at the campaigns of the war with Holland, and to offer himself for all the delicate negotiations for his master or the king. He received diplomatic missions in Germany, in Holland, and especially in Spain, though it was only in 1694, that he was freed from the condemnation pronounced against him by the chamber of justice. From 1696 he fell ill and withdrew to his estate, where he dictated to his secretary, in four months and a half, his Mémoires, an important source for the history of his time. In spite of several errors, introduced purposely, they give a clear idea of the life and morals of a financier of the age of Fouquet, and throw light on certain points of the diplomatic history. They were first published in 1724.

Gourville died in Paris on June 14, 1703.
