= Louis Alexandre de La Rochefoucauld, 6th Duke of La Rochefoucauld =

French nobleman and politician

Louis Alexandre de La Rochefoucauld
- 6th Duke of La Rochefoucauld; 2nd Duke of Anville
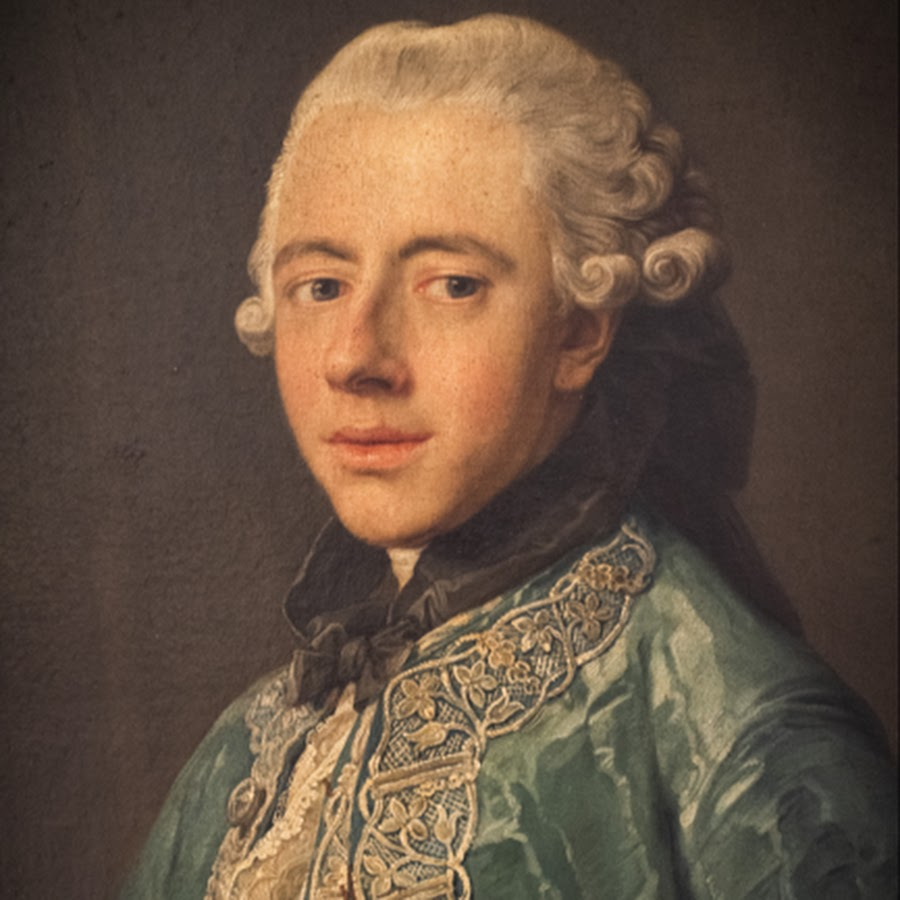

- Coat of arms
- Full name: Louis Alexandre de La Rochefoucauld
- Born: 4 July 1743; Paris, France
- Died: 4 September 1792 (aged 49); Gisors, Normandy
- Noble family: of La Rochefoucauld
- Spouses: Louise-Pauline de Gand de Mérode (m. 1762; died 1771) Alexandrine Charlotte de Rohan-Chabot (m. 1780; died 1792)
- Father: Jean Baptiste de La Rochefoucauld d'Anville
- Mother: Marie-Louise-Nicole de La Rochefoucauld

Louis Alexandre de La Rochefoucauld, 6th Duke of La Rochefoucauld (4 July 1743 – 4 September 1792) was a French nobleman and politician who was a major lord under the Ancien Régime. He also played a political role in 1789 early on in the French Revolution before being executed in the September Massacres. He was a duke, initially with the title 'duc d'Enville' or 'duc d'Anville' and later with that of 6th duc de La Rochefoucauld.

== Early life ==
La Rochefoucauld was born into the House of La Rochefoucauld, one of the oldest and most famous French noble families, originating in La Roche in the 10th-11th centuries. He was the only son of Jean-Baptiste de La Rochefoucauld de Roye, who was killed in the 1746 Duc d'Anville expedition, and Marie-Louise-Nicole de La Rochefoucauld, eldest daughter of Alexandre de La Rochefoucauld, 5th Duke of La Rochefoucauld.

== Career ==
He was one of the keenest French defenders of the American Revolution, befriending and translating for Benjamin Franklin – in Paris in 1783, he and Franklin published Constitutions des Treize États-Unis de l'Amérique (Constitutions of the Thirteen United States of America). He was also passionate about natural sciences and travelled to England, Sweden (where he became a member of the Royal Swedish Academy of Sciences), Germany, Switzerland, Italy and Savoy. His friends also included Desmarest, Dolomieu, Saussure, Turgot, Condorcet. He served as president of the Société royale de médecine and the Académie royale des sciences. In 1786, he was elected to the American Philosophical Society.

He was elected as a deputy to the Estates General of 1789 and was one of the 47 deputies from the nobility who joined forces with the Third Estate on 25 June 1789. He proposed article XI of the 1789 pro-abolitionist Déclaration des droits de l'Homme et du citoyen [Declaration of the Rights of Man and of the Citizen], which was adopted.

=== French revolution ===
Worried by the turn of events, he became a member of his department's directory after the Constituent Assembly split. In early July, he opposed Pétion and Louis Pierre Manuel, and after the events of 10 August 1792 he resigned and left Paris to escape the people's anger. He was arrested at Gisors whilst escorting his wife and mother from Forges to the château de La Roche-Guyon, accompanied by Dolomieu. He was killed on 4 September 1792 by volunteer troops from Sarthe and Orne who were hunting aristocrats whilst en route to fight the Prussians, who were aiming to capture Verdun. The city authorities and Dolomieu tried in vain to save him.

== Personal life ==
In 1762, he married Louise-Pauline de Gand de Mérode (1747–1771), a daughter of Alexandre Maximilien Balthasar de Gand Vilain de Mérode and Elisabeth Pauline Marguerite Françoise de La Rochefoucauld. Also in 1762, he inherited the title of Duke of La Rochefoucauld on the death of his grandfather Alexandre de La Rochefoucauld. They had no children.

After the death of his wife in 1771, he remarried to his niece, Alexandrine Charlotte de Rohan-Chabot, daughter of Louis Antoine de Rohan-Chabot, 6th Duke of Rohan, and Élisabeth Louise de La Rochefoucauld, in 1780. This marriage was also without issue.

Upon his death, the dukedom of Anville became extinct and his cousin, François Alexandre Frédéric de La Rochefoucauld-Liancourt became the 7th Duke of La Rochefoucauld.

French nobility
Preceded by Jean-Baptiste de La Rochefoucauld de Roye	Duke of Anville; 1746–1792	Extinct
Preceded by Alexandre de La Rochefoucauld	Duke of La Rochefoucauld; 1762–1792	Succeeded by François Alexandre Frédéric de La Rochefoucauld
