= François de La Rochefoucauld, 1st Duke of La Rochefoucauld =

French nobleman (1588–1650)

François de La Rochefoucauld
- 1st Duke of La Rochefoucauld
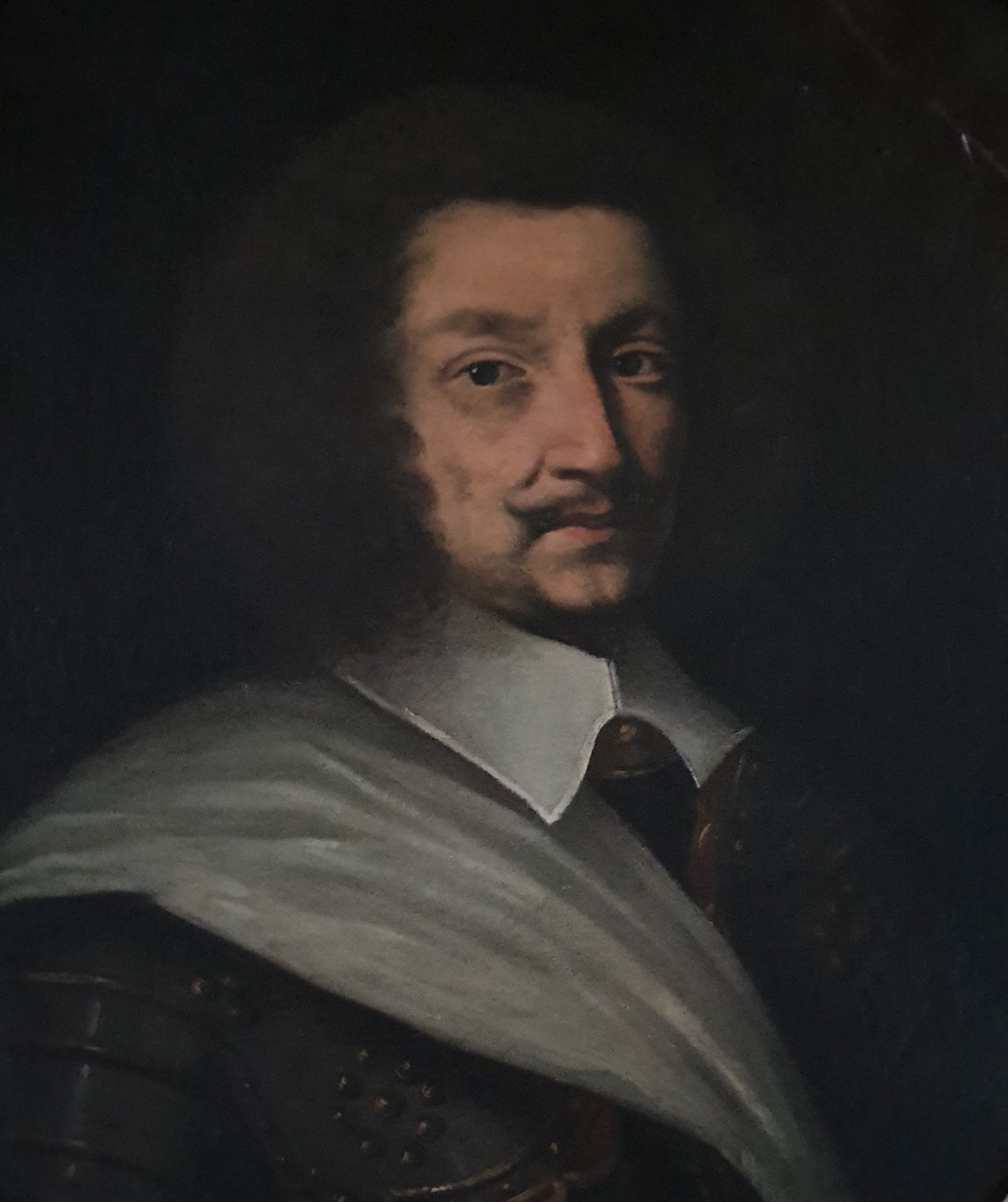

- Coat of arms
- Full name: François de La Rochefoucauld
- Born: 5 September 1588; Château de La Rochefoucauld, La Rochefoucauld, France
- Died: 8 February 1650 (aged 61); Château de La Rochefoucauld, La Rochefoucauld, France
- Noble family: of La Rochefoucauld
- Spouse: Gabrielle du Plessis (after 1611)
- Issue: François, 2nd Duke of La Rochefoucauld; Louis, Abbé de Marsillac; Marie Elisabeth, Abbess of Saint Sauveur d' Évreux; Catherine, Abbess of Charenton; Marie Catherine, Marquise of Puisieux
- Father: François de La Rochefoucauld, Count of La Rochefoucauld
- Mother: Claude de Madaillan, Dame of Estissac

François de La Rochefoucauld, 1st Duke of La Rochefoucauld (7 September 1588 – 8 February 1650) was a French nobleman. He was the father of François de La Rochefoucauld author of Réflexions ou sentences et maximes morales better known as the Maximes.

== Early life ==
La Rochefoucauld was born on 7 September 1588 at his family's Château de La Rochefoucauld, in La Rochefoucauld, in the Angoumois, France. He was the son of François de La Rochefoucauld, Count of La Rochefoucauld, and Claude de Madaillan, Dame of Estissac.

== Career ==
After his father was killed at Saint-Yrieix by the Catholic League on 15 March 1591, he inherited the title Count of La Rochefoucauld which he remained until 22 April 1622, when King Louis XIII raised his county of La Rochefoucauld to a dukedom with the influence of his mother Queen Marie de' Medici having attended her coronation on 14 May 1610.

== Personal life ==
By contract dated 1 March 1611, he married Gabrielle du Plessis, a daughter of Charles du Plessis and Antoinette de Pons, Marquise of Guercheville, and lady-in-waiting to Marie de' Medici. Together, they had twelve children, including:

1. François de La Rochefoucauld, 2nd Duke of La Rochefoucauld (1613–1680), who married Andrée de Vivonne.
2. Louis de La Rochefoucauld (1615–1654), the Abbot of Saint-Jean-d'Angély, 1650 Bishop of Lectoure, called Abbé de Marsillac.
3. Marie Elisabeth de La Rochefoucauld (1617–1698), Abbess of Saint Sauveur d' Évreux.
4. Catherine de La Rochefoucauld (1619–1710), Abbess of Charenton, then of Le Paraclet.
5. Marie Catherine de La Rochefoucauld (1622–1698), who married Louis Roger Brûlart de Sillery, Marquis of Puisieux.
6. Antoinette Jeanne de La Rochefoucauld (1623–1647)
7. Gabrielle Marie de La Rochefoucauld (1624–1693), Abbess of Le Paraclet 1646 to then Abbess of Notre-Dame de Soissons.
8. Anne Françoise de La Rochefoucauld (1626–1685), coadjutor of Saint Sauveur d'Évreux.
9. Hilaire Charles de La Rochefoucauld (1628–1651), Knight, then Chancellor of the Order of Malta
10. Louise de La Rochefoucauld (1630–1651), a nun at Saint Sauveur d'Évreux.
11. Aimery de La Rochefoucauld (1633–c. 1638), who died young.
12. Henri de La Rochefoucauld (1634–1708), priest then Aabbot of La Chaise-Dieu and Abbot of Fontfroide.

The Duke died at the Château de La Rochefoucauld on 8 February 1650. He was succeeded by his eldest son, François.

== Arms ==
- Burelé d'argent et d'azur, à trois chevrons de gueules brochant sur le tout, le premier écimé

== Titles ==
- 15 March 1591 – 22 April 1622 The Count of La Rochefoucauld.
- 22 April 1622 – 8 February 1650 The Duke of La Rochefoucauld, Peer of France.
