= François de La Rochefoucauld, 4th Duke of La Rochefoucauld =

French nobleman (1663–1728)

François de La Rochefoucauld
- 4th Duke of La Rochefoucauld; 1st Duke of La Roche-Guyon
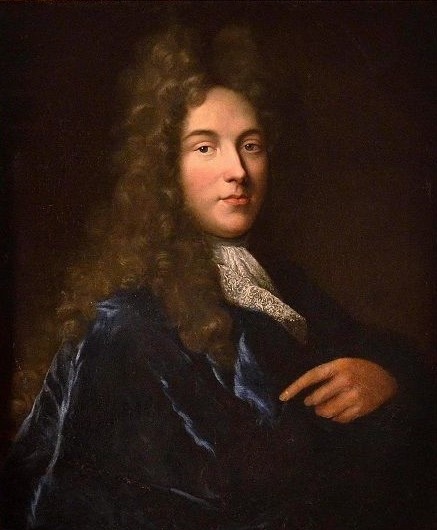

- Coat of arms
- Full name: François de La Rochefoucauld
- Born: 17 July 1663
- Died: 22 April 1728 (aged 64)
- Noble family: of La Rochefoucauld
- Spouse: Madeleine Le Tellier (m. 1679; died 1728)
- Issue: Alexandre, 5th Duke of La Rochefoucauld; Émilie, Duchess of Uzès
- Father: François VII de La Rochefoucauld
- Mother: Jeanne Charlotte du Plessis

François VIII de La Rochefoucauld, 4th Duke of La Rochefoucauld, 1st Duke of La Roche-Guyon (17 August 1663 – 22 April 1728) was a French nobleman who succeeded his father as Duke of La Rochefoucauld and Grand Huntsman of France in January 1714.

== Early life ==
La Rochefoucauld was born on 17 August 1663. He was the son of François VII de La Rochefoucauld and Jeanne Charlotte du Plessis-Liancourt (1644–1669), daughter of Henri du Plessis-Liancourt, Count of La Roche-Guyon. His younger brother, Henri Roger de La Rochefoucauld, Marquis of Liancourt, never married.

== Career ==
He succeeded his father as Grand Huntsman of France, a position in the King's Household in France during the Ancien Régime.

In 1679, as a gift of the King Louis XIV for his marriage with the eldest daughter of François-Michel Le Tellier, Marquis de Louvois, he was created 1st Duke of La Roche-Guyon by letters of November 1679. Upon his father's death in 1714, he inherited the Duchy-peerage of La Rochefoucauld.

== Personal life ==
In 1679, he married Madeleine Le Tellier (1665–1735), eldest daughter of François-Michel Le Tellier, Marquis de Louvois, King Louis XIV's Finance Minister, and heiress Anne de Souvré, Marquise de Courtenvaux. Together, they were the parents of:

1. François de La Rochefoucauld (1681–1699), who died unmarried.
2. Charles Maurice de La Rochefoucauld (1684–1694), who died young.
3. Michel Camille de La Rochefoucauld (1686–1712), who died unmarried.
4. Roger de La Rochefoucauld (1687–1717), who died unmarried.
5. Guy de La Rochefoucauld (1688–1698), who died young.
6. Madeleine Françoise de La Rochefoucauld (1689–1717), who became a nun at Saint Denis de Paris.
7. Alexandre de La Rochefoucauld, 5th Duke of La Rochefoucauld (1690–1762), who married Marie Élisabeth Bermond du Caylard, only child of Jacques François de Bermond du Caylard, Marquis of Toiras, and Françoise Louise de Bérard, Marquise of Vestric, in 1715.
8. Aimery de La Rochefoucauld (1691–1699), who died young.
9. Guy de La Rochefoucauld (1698–1731), styled Duke of La Roche-Guyon, who married his niece, Marie Louise Élisabeth Nicole de La Rochefoucauld, the eldest daughter of his brother Alexandre. After his death, she married their distant cousin, Jean-Baptiste de La Rochefoucauld de Roye, duc d'Anville.
10. Émilie de La Rochefoucauld (1700–1753), who married Charles Emmanuel de Crussol, 8th Duke of Uzès, the eldest son of Jean Charles de Crussol, 7th Duke of Uzès.

The Duke died on 22 April 1728.

French nobility
| Preceded by François de La Rochefoucauld | Duke of La Rochefoucauld; 1714–1728 | Succeeded by Alexandre de La Rochefoucauld |
