= La Rochefoucauld-en-Angoumois =

- Commune
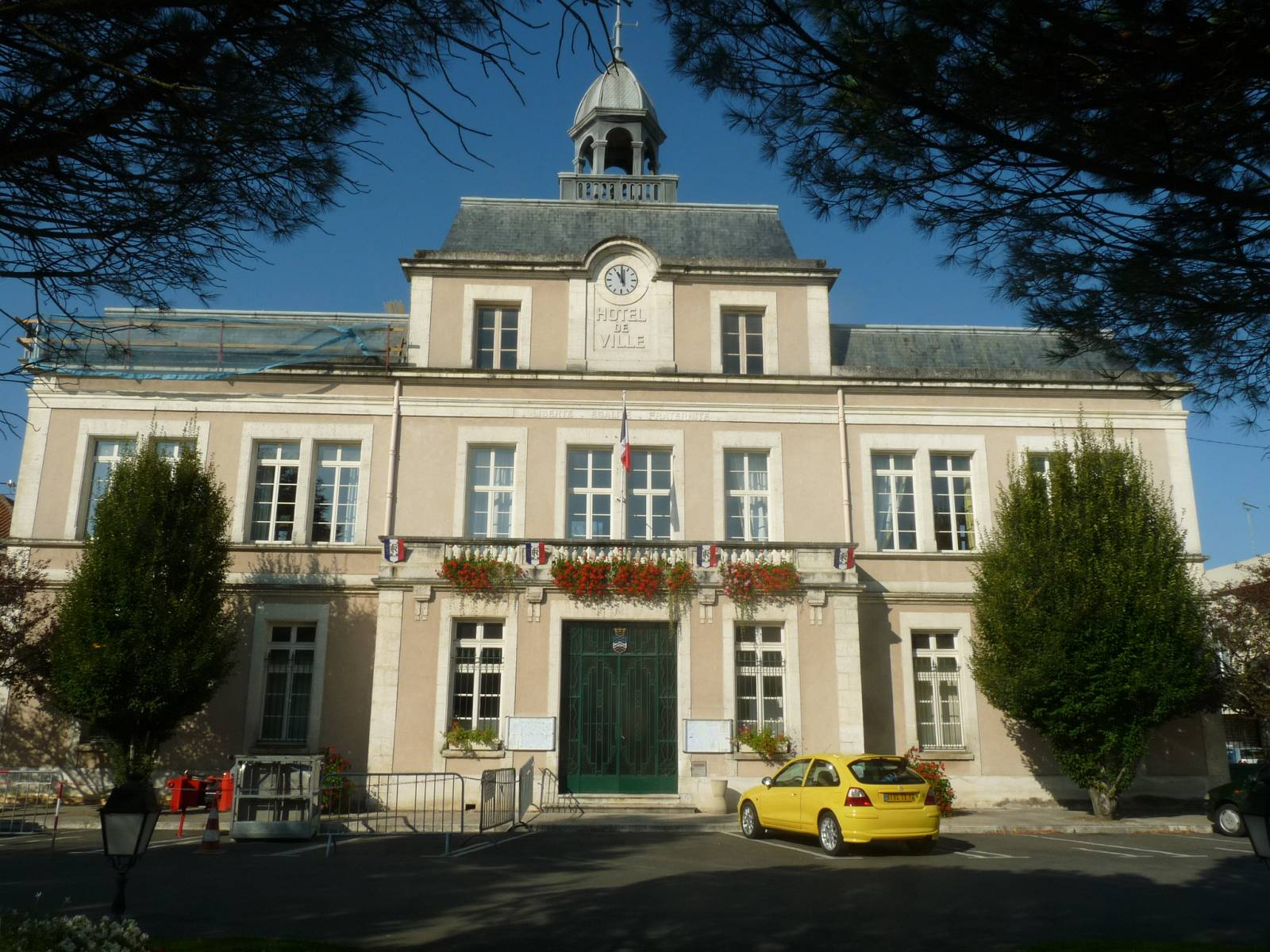
- The town hall in La Rochefoucauld-en-Angoumois
- Location of La Rochefoucauld-en-Angoumois
- Location within France Location within Nouvelle-Aquitaine
- Coordinates: 45°44′29″N 0°23′14″E
- Country: France
- Region: Nouvelle-Aquitaine
- Department: Charente
- Arrondissement: Angoulême
- Canton: Val de Tardoire
- Intercommunality: La Rochefoucauld - Porte du Périgord

Government
  - Mayor (2020–2026): Jean Louis Marsaud
- Area^{1}: 24.15 km^{2} (9.32 sq mi)
- Highest elevation: 136 m (446 ft)
- Lowest elevation: 75 m (246 ft)
- Population (2023): 4,025
  - Density: 166.7/km^{2} (431.7/sq mi)
- Time zone: UTC+01:00 (CET)
  - Summer (DST): UTC+02:00 (CEST)
- INSEE/Postal code: 16281 /16110
- ^{1} French Land Register data, which excludes lakes, ponds, glaciers > 1 km^{2} (0.386 sq mi or 247 acres) and river estuaries.

La Rochefoucauld-en-Angoumois (French pronunciation: [la ʁɔʃfuko ɑ̃.n‿ɑ̃ɡumwa], literally La Rochefoucauld in Angoumois; Occitan: La Ròcha Focaud d'Engolmés) is a commune in the department of Charente, southwestern France. It was established on 1 January 2019 by merger of the former communes of La Rochefoucauld (the seat) and Saint-Projet-Saint-Constant.

In February 2021, speleologists explored a kilometre-long sepulchral cave containing numerous ceramics and a dozen human skulls. The site, located in the commune, was occupied for more than a millennium during the Bronze Age, until about 900 BC.

== Population ==
Population data refer to the commune in its geography as of January 2025.

Historical population
Year	Pop.	±% p.a.
1968	4,434	—
1975	4,453	+0.06%
1982	4,070	−1.28%
1990	4,290	+0.66%
1999	4,148	−0.37%
2007	4,188	+0.12%
2012	3,961	−1.11%
2017	3,981	+0.10%
2023	4,025	+0.18%
Source: INSEE

== See also ==
- Communes of the Charente department
