= Alexandre de La Rochefoucauld, 5th Duke of La Rochefoucauld =

French aristocrat (1690 - 1762)

Alexandre de La Rochefoucauld
- 5th Duke of La Rochefoucauld, 2nd Duke of La Roche-Guyon
- Coat of arms
- Full name: Alexandre de La Rochefoucauld
- Born: 29 September 1690; Paris, France
- Died: 4 March 1762 (aged 72); Château de La Roche-Guyon, La Roche-Guyon, Val-d'Oise
- Noble family: of La Rochefoucauld
- Spouse: Élisabeth Bermond du Caylard (30 July 1715)
- Issue: Louise Nicole Élisabeth, Duchess of La Roche-Guyon; Marie, Duchess of Estissac
- Father: François VIII de La Rochefoucauld
- Mother: Madeleine Le Tellier

Alexandre de La Rochefoucauld, 5th Duke of La Rochefoucauld, 2nd duke of La Roche-Guyon (29 September 1690 – 4 March 1762) was a French aristocrat.

== Early life ==
He was the eldest surviving son of François VIII de La Rochefoucauld, 4th Duke of La Rochefoucauld, 1st duke of La Roche-Guyon and Madeleine Le Tellier, daughter of François-Michel Le Tellier, Marquis de Louvois, minister of Louis XIV and Anne de Souvré.

== Career ==
Upon the death of his father in 1728, he became the 5th Duke of La Rochefoucauld. Due to him only having daughters, he was requested, and was granted, permission by the Pope and by letters patent of the French King to transmit the ducal title to the male issue through the female line on the condition that his daughter marry a member of the La Rochefoucauld family. Therefore, upon his death, his title passed to his grandson, Louis Alexandre de La Rochefoucauld due to salic law.

== Personal life ==
On 30 July 1715, Élisabeth Bermond du Caylard (1691-1752), only child of Jacques François de Bermond du Caylard, Marquis of Toiras, and Françoise Louise de Bérard, Marquise of Vestric. Together, they were the parents of:

1. Marie-Louise Nicole Élisabeth de La Rochefoucauld (1716–1797), who married her uncle, Guy de La Rochefoucauld, duc de La Roche-Guyon. After his death in 1731, she married Jean-Baptiste de La Rochefoucauld de Roye, duc d'Anville.
2. François de La Rochefoucauld (1717–1718), who died young.
3. Marie de La Rochefoucauld, Dame of Liancourt (1718–1789), who married Louis François Armand de La Rochefoucauld de Roye duke of Estissac.
4. François de La Rochefoucauld (1720–1721), who died young.
5. Adélaïde de La Rochefoucauld (1722–1737), who died young.

Upon his death, his grandson, Louis-Alexandre de La Rochefoucauld (1743–1792), became the 6th Duke of La Rochefoucauld. Upon the death of his eldest daughter, the estate of La Roche-Guyon was inherited by her two surviving children, Alexandre, Duke of Rohan and Alexandrine Charlotte de Rohan-Chabot.

French nobility
Preceded by François de La Rochefoucauld	Duke of La Rochefoucauld; 1728–1762	Succeeded by Louis Alexandre de La Rochefoucauld
