= Saint-Projet-Saint-Constant =

- Part of La Rochefoucauld-en-Angoumois
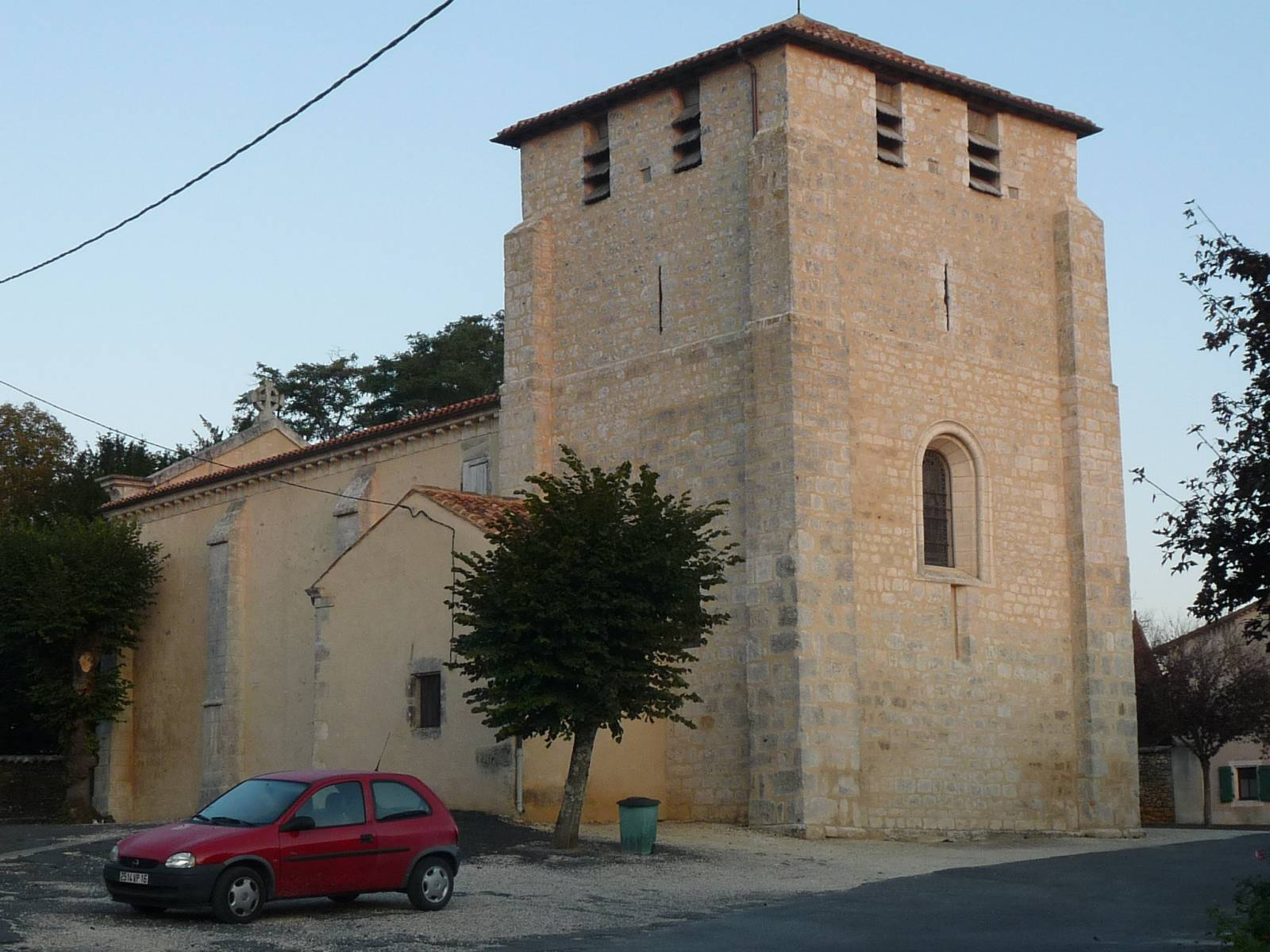
- Location of Saint-Projet-Saint-Constant
- Location within France Location within Nouvelle-Aquitaine
- Coordinates: 45°44′23″N 0°21′41″E
- Country: France
- Region: Nouvelle-Aquitaine
- Department: Charente
- Arrondissement: Angoulême
- Canton: Val de Tardoire
- Commune: La Rochefoucauld-en-Angoumois
- Area^{1}: 16.94 km^{2} (6.54 sq mi)
- Elevation: 108 m (354 ft)
- Highest elevation: 153 m (502 ft)
- Lowest elevation: 75 m (246 ft)
- Population (2022): 1,091
  - Density: 64.40/km^{2} (166.8/sq mi)
- Time zone: UTC+01:00 (CET)
  - Summer (DST): UTC+02:00 (CEST)
- Postal code: 16110
- ^{1} French Land Register data, which excludes lakes, ponds, glaciers > 1 km^{2} (0.386 sq mi or 247 acres) and river estuaries.

Saint-Projet-Saint-Constant (French pronunciation: [sɛ̃ pʁɔʒɛ sɛ̃ kɔ̃stɑ̃]; Occitan: Sent Priech e Sent Constanç) is a former commune in the Charente department in southwestern France. It was created in 1845 by the merger of the former communes Saint-Projet and Saint-Constant. On 1 January 2019, it was merged into the new commune La Rochefoucauld-en-Angoumois.

== Population ==
Historical population

Year	Pop.	±% p.a.
1846	680	—
1872	591	−0.54%
1901	523	−0.42%
1926	516	−0.05%
1946	522	+0.06%
1962	659	+1.47%
1968	652	−0.18%

Year	Pop.	±% p.a.
1975	754	+2.10%
1982	794	+0.74%
1990	842	+0.74%
1999	920	+0.99%
2006	1,016	+1.43%
2022	1,091	+0.45%

Source: EHESS and INSEE (2022)

== See also ==
- Communes of the Charente department
