= François de La Rochefoucauld, 3rd Duke of La Rochefoucauld =

French nobleman (1634–1714)

François de La Rochefoucauld
- 3rd Duke of La Rochefoucauld
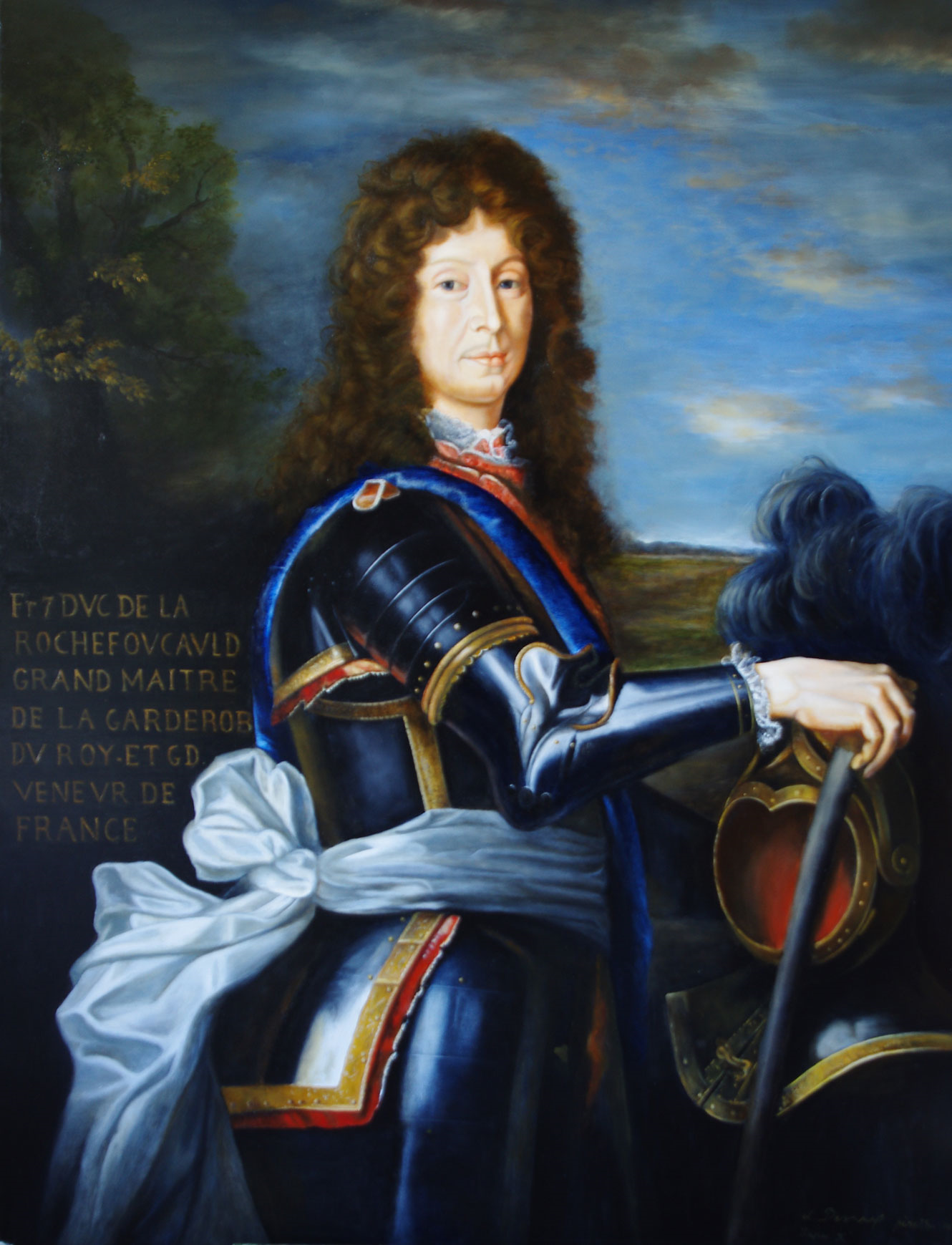
- 1683 portrait of the 3rd Duke of La Rochefoucauld by an unknown artist

- Coat of arms
- Full name: François de La Rochefoucauld
- Born: 15 June 1634; Paris, France
- Died: 11 January 1714 (aged 70); Versailles, France
- Noble family: of La Rochefoucauld
- Spouse: Jeanne Charlotte du Plessis (November 10, 1659)
- Issue: François, 4th Duke of La Rochefoucauld; Henri Roger, Marquis of Liancourt
- Father: François VI de La Rochefoucauld, 2nd Duke of La Rochefoucauld
- Mother: Andrée de Vivonne

François VII de La Rochefoucauld, 3rd Duke of La Rochefoucauld (15 June 1634 – 11 January 1714), son of the author of the maxims Francois VI de La Rochefoucauld, was a French nobleman during the reign of King Louis XIV, one of his closest friends, who also created him Grand Huntsman of France in 1679.

== Marriage ==
On November 10, 1659, he married Jeanne Charlotte du Plessis-Liancourt (1644 – 30 September 1669), daughter of Henri du Plessis-Liancourt, Count of La Roche-Guyon.

== Children ==
1. François de La Rochefoucauld, 4th Duke of La Rochefoucauld (17 August 1663 – 22 April 1728), married Madeleine Charlotte Le Tellier.
2. Henri Roger de La Rochefoucauld, Marquis of Liancourt (14 June 1665 – 21 March 1749), never married.
3. Charlotte de La Rochefoucauld (1666 – 17 August 1676), died young.

== Arms ==
- Burelé d'argent et d'azur de dix pièces, à trois chevrons de gueules brochant sur le tout, le premier écimé

French nobility
| Preceded by François de La Rochefoucauld | Duke of La Rochefoucauld; 1680–1714 | Succeeded by François de La Rochefoucauld |
