= Grand Huntsman of France =

Functionary of the French crown

Henri, Prince of Condé (1588-1646), Grand Veneur de France

The Grand Huntsman of France (French: Grand Veneur de France) was a position in the King's Household in France during the Ancien Régime. The position, which is sometimes grouped with the Great Officers of the Crown of France, was one of the "Great Offices of the Maison du Roi", and was equivalent to that of the "Grand Master of the Hunt" in certain European royal households.

== History ==
The Grand Veneur was responsible for the royal hunt. The title was created in 1413 by Charles VI at roughly the same time as those of Grand Falconer of France and the "Capitaine du vautrait". The Grand Veneur took care of the king's hunting dogs (roughly 100 hounds) for the stag hunt. Under Charles VIII, he oversaw nine squires (écuyers), nine huntsmen (veneurs), two aides, six valets for the hounds (valets de limiers) and one dog handler for the foxhounds. The service gained even greater prestige under Francis I and Henry II, and the position reached a high point under Henry IV; in 1596, 182 persons were employed by the royal hunt, which included lieutenants, sous-lieutenants, gentlemen, valets for the hounds, mounted and unmounted valets for the dogs, and finally a surgeon and an apothecary.

The Grand Veneur was the most important of all the royal offices dealing with the hunt. In the 16th century, the house of Guise held the position five times. In the 17th century, the family Rohan-Montbazon held it three times. At the beginning of the 18th century, the position was given by Louis XIV to Louis-Alexandre de Bourbon, Comte de Toulouse, one of his legitimized children, who, in turn, passed it on to his son Louis Jean Marie de Bourbon, duc de Penthièvre.

From the 16th century, the holder of the position received an annual salary of 1200 livres, which was a relatively small sum within the royal household. The Grand Veneur also received additional revenues (up to 10,000 livres). According to Saint-Simon, in 1714, the new Duke de La Rochefoucauld sold, for a sum of 500,000 livres. his office of Grand Veneur, which he had just inherited upon the death of his father.

Up to a point, the Grand Veneur de France position is comparable to the one of Master of the Buckhounds in the English monarchy.

== List of Grand Huntsmen of France ==
- 1315-1355: Renaud de Giry, knight, advisor to the King, master of his hunting.
- 1355-1357: Jean de Meudon
- 1357-1372: Jean de Corguilleray
- 1372-1377: Jean de Thubeauville
- 1377-1399: Philippes de Corguilleray
- 1399-1410: Robert de Franconville
- 1410-1418: Guillaume II de Gamaches
- 1418-1424: Jean Ier de Berghes Saint-Winoch
- 1451-1457: Guillaume Soreau), Lord of Saint-Géran
- 1457-1467: Roland de Lescoet, Lord of Queriperez
- 1467-1471: Guillaume de Nort, Lord of Callac in Guéméné
- 1472-1481: Yvon du Fou, Lord of Kerjestin
- 1481-1483: Georges de Chateaubriant, Lord of Roches-Baritaud
- 1483-1488: Yvon du Fou, Lord of Kerjestin, 2nd term
- 1488-1496: Louis de Rouville, Lord of Rouville
- 1496-1497: Louis de Brézé, Count of Maulévrier, Lord of Anet, Marshal and Seneschal of Normandy
- 1498-1506: Jacques de Dinteville, Lord of Dammartin
- 1506-1525: Louis de Rouville, Lord of Rouville
- 1526-1550: Claude of Lorraine (1496-1550), Duke of Guise
- 1550-1563: François de Lorraine (1519-1563), Duke of Guise
- 1563-1573: Claude II of Lorraine (1526-1573), Duke of Aumale
- 1573-15??: Charles of Lorraine (1555-1631), Duke of Aumale
- 15??-1602: Charles I (1556-1605), Duke of Elbeuf
- 1602-1643: Hercule de Rohan (c. 1568-1654), Duke of Montbazon
- 1643-1646: Henry II of Bourbon (1588-1646), Prince of Condé
- 1646-1654: Hercule de Rohan (c. 1568-1654), Duke of Montbazon, 2nd term
- 1654-1656: Louis VIII of Rohan (1598-1667), Duke of Montbazon, son of the previous
- 1656-1669: Louis de Rohan (1635-1674), Knight of Rohan, Count of Mortiercrolles, son of the previous
- 1669-1679: Charles Maximilien de Belleforière (circa 1619 - 1679), Marquis of Soyécourt
- 1679-1714: François VII de La Rochefoucauld (1634-1714), Duke of La Rochefoucauld
- 1714-1714: François VIII de La Rochefoucauld (1663-1728), Prince of Marcillac, son of the previous
- 1714-1737: Louis Alexandre de Bourbon (1678-1737), Count of Toulouse, natural son of Louis XIV
- 1737-1755: Louis Jean Marie de Bourbon (1725-1793), Duke of Penthièvre, son of the previous
- 1755-1768: Louis-Alexandre de Bourbon (1747-1768), Prince of Lamballe, son of the previous
- 1768-1791: Louis Jean Marie de Bourbon (1725-1793), 2nd term
- 1791-1804: French Republic
- 1804-1814: Louis-Alexandre Berthier (1753-1815), Marshal of France, prince de Wagram
- 1814-1821: Function abolished
- 1821-1822: Armand-Emmanuel de Vignerot du Plessis (1766-1822), Duke of Richelieu.
- 1823-1828: Jacques Lauriston, Marshal of France, Marquis of Lauriston
- 1828-1852: Function abolished
- 1852-1865: Bernard Pierre Magnan (1791-1865), Marshal of France
- 1865-1870: Napoléon-Edgar Ney (1812-1882), General, Prince de la Moskowa.

=== Etymology ===
The word French "veneur" (huntsman), derives from the Middle French word "vener" (to hunt), (itself from the Latin venor, verb meaning to hunt), from which also was derived the archaic English words "venerer" (hunter) and "venery" (the hunt).

== See also ==
- Grand Huntsman of Brabant
- Great Officers of the Crown of France
- Maison du Roi
- Medieval hunting
- Protokynegos
