= Duc d'Anville expedition =

1746 military expedition

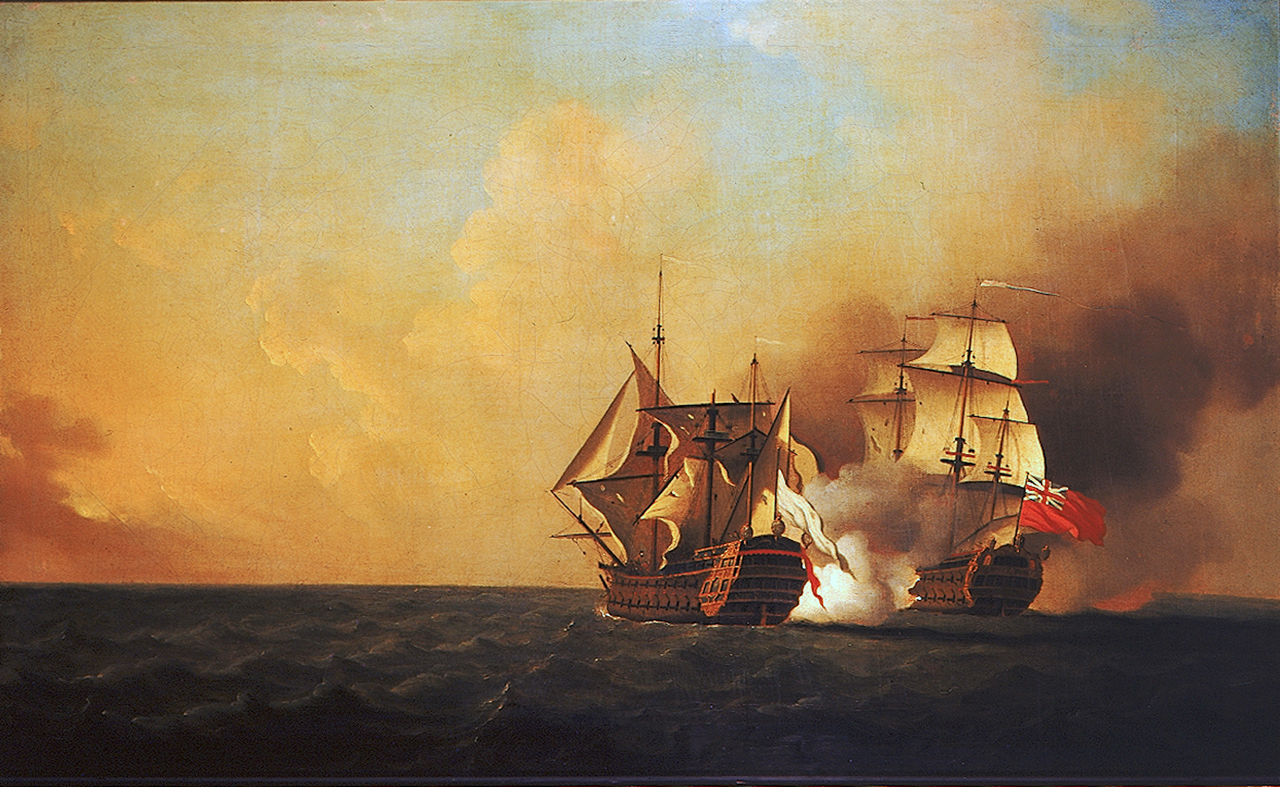
Samuel Scott's Action between HMS Nottingham and the Mars. Le Mars was returning to France after the failed Duc d'Anville Expedition, 11 October 1746 and was subsequently captured.

The Duc d'Anville expedition was sent from France to recapture Louisbourg and take peninsular Acadia (present-day mainland Nova Scotia). The expedition was the largest French military force to set sail for the New World prior to the American Revolutionary War. This effort was the fourth and final French attempt to regain the Nova Scotian capital, Annapolis Royal, during King George's War. The Expedition was also supported on land by a force from Quebec under the command of Jean-Baptiste Nicolas Roch de Ramezay. Along with recapturing Acadia from the British, d'Anville was ordered to "consign Boston to flames, ravage New England and waste the British West Indies." News of the expedition spread fear throughout New York and New England.

The expedition was a complete failure. It was beset by bad weather and took three months to cross the Atlantic Ocean. Many in the ships' crews and the troops being transported fell ill before the expedition finally reached Chebucto Bay (present-day Halifax Harbour), and d'Anville died not long after its arrival. His successors in command attempted to mount an assault on Annapolis Royal, but eventually gave up and returned to France. Henry Wadsworth Longfellow immortalized the expedition with his poem A Ballad of the French Fleet.

== Historic context ==
The British had captured the capital of Acadia in the siege of Port Royal (1710) and renamed it Annapolis Royal. Over the next fifty years, the French and their allies made six unsuccessful military attempts to regain the city. The Duc d'Anville expedition, which was coordinated with Ramezay's expedition from Quebec, was the last French attempt to retake the capital of Acadia. King Louis XV sent it during King George's War, following the stinging French defeat at the siege of Louisbourg (1745).

== Preparation ==
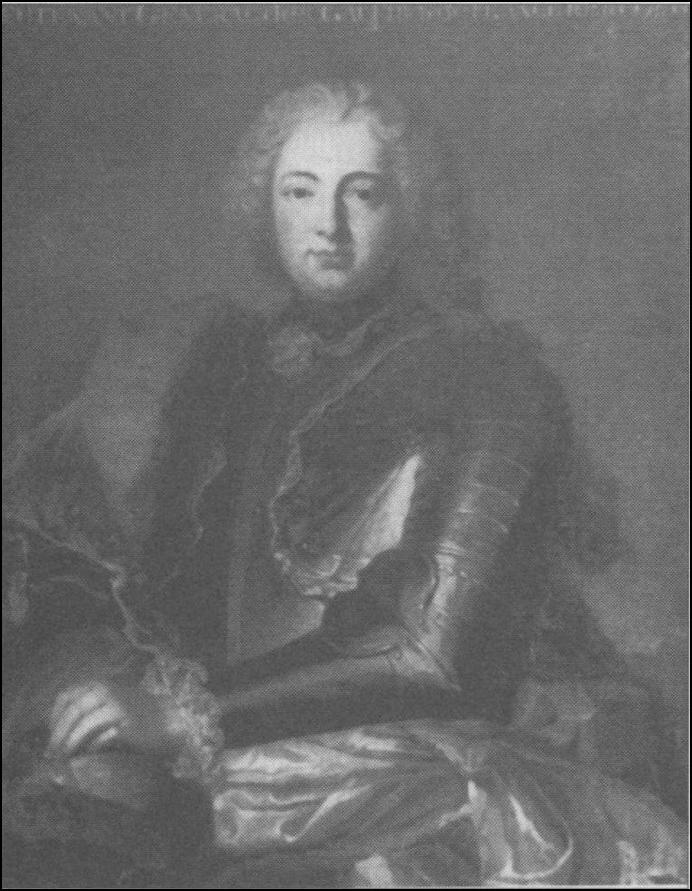
Admiral Jean-Baptiste Louis Frédéric de La Rochefoucauld de Roye, Duc d'Anville

The expedition included 11,000 men and a fleet of 64 ships. The expedition was led by French Admiral Jean-Baptiste Louis Frédéric de La Rochefoucauld de Roye, Duc d'Anville. The commissary general in charge of supplies was François Bigot. The fitting-out of this fleet was slow and difficult, and it did not set sail from Île-d'Aix, France until 22 June 1746. A subsequent storm in the Bay of Biscay and adverse winds slowed the transatlantic crossing. Disease broke out on the ships – typhus and scurvy.

The fleet ran into a long, dead calm off the Azores. This ended in a storm, during which several vessels were struck by lightning, which, in one case, caused a magazine explosion that killed and wounded over thirty men. By 24 August, the expedition had been at sea for over two months but was still 300 leagues (1,400 km) from Nova Scotia.

On 10 September, lead elements of the expedition had arrived at Sable Island. Three days later the vessels were scattered by a violent gale that seriously damaged some ships, which were consequently forced to return to France. One of the damaged vessels was Le Mars (pictured above). She was heavily damaged and taking on water in the storm off Sable Island and decided to return to France with Le Raphael. Several weeks later another gale hit, damaging Le Mars further and separating her from Le Raphael. Twenty leagues (97 km) off Ireland HMS Nottingham severely damaged Le Mars in an attack and took her as a prize in October 1746. She was added to the British Navy as HMS Mars (during the French and Indian War, this ship sank in Halifax Harbour in June 1755 after hitting a rock – known to this day as "Mars Rock".)

An expedition under the command of Jean-Baptiste Nicolas Roch de Ramezay was sent from Quebec to work with d'Anville's expedition. French priest Jean-Louis Le Loutre was to coordinate the two expeditions. (French priest Pierre Maillard, returning from France, sailed with the expedition.) De Ramezay's force arrived in Nova Scotia in July 1746. He had 700 soldiers and 21 officers. He made camp at Beaubassin, where he was met by 300 Abenaki from St. John River and about 300 Mi'kmaq from Nova Scotia. The total French-Abenaki-Mi'kmaq force numbered close to 1,300 men. De Ramezay's soldiers spent the summer and early fall at Chignecto and Minas waiting for the arrival of the long overdue D'Anville expedition. (During this time period, de Ramezay sent troops to British-occupied Port-La-Joye on present-day Prince Edward Island. In the Battle at Port-la-Joye, de Ramezay's men killed 34 unarmed British soldiers and sailors and captured seven.)

== Nova Scotia ==
The d'Anville expedition finally reached Nova Scotia in late September, after enduring a three-month voyage. Hundreds of sailors and soldiers had died and hundreds more were gravely ill, suffering from disease. Forty-four vessels anchored in Chebucto (present day Halifax, Nova Scotia), where the expedition would spend the next five weeks. The sick were brought ashore near Birch Cove in the harbour's Bedford Basin. Some recovered from scurvy with the arrival of fresh supplies brought by the Acadians from Grand Pre and Pisiquid, but typhus and typhoid continued to ravage the men.

Within six days of his arrival, on 27 September, d'Anville died after suffering a stroke. (He was buried on Georges Island in what is now Halifax Harbour. His remains stayed there for three years before being taken to Louisbourg in September 1749 during the establishment of Halifax.)

On 29 September a council of war led by d'Anville's replacement, Constantin-Louis d'Estourmel, decided to send 1,500 men from the expedition and 300 from the Ramezay expedition to attack Annapolis Royal. D'Estourmel became overwhelmed and discouraged and quickly resigned after a suicide attempt.

The next to assume control of the expedition was the Governor General designate of New France and passenger with the fleet Jacques-Pierre de Taffanel de la Jonquière, Marquis de la Jonquière. The plan to attack the capital Annapolis Royal intensified, even while men continued to die of disease. By mid-October, 41 percent of the men who reached Chebucto with the fleet were dead or seriously ill – 2,861 petty officers, seamen and soldiers. The contagion spread to the Mi'kmaq and de Ramezay's men.

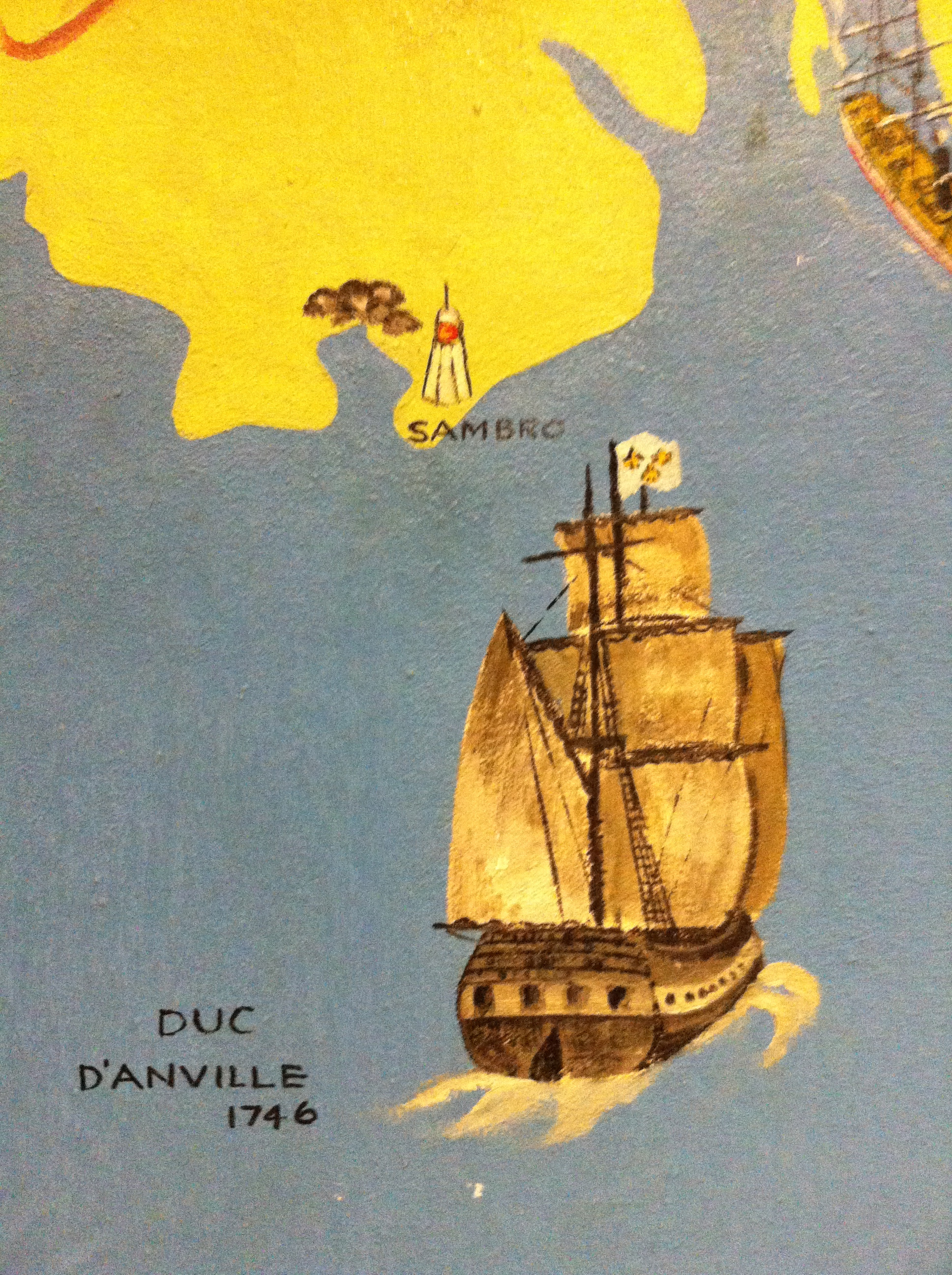
Duc d'Anville approaching Chebucto, Westin Hotel Murial (inset), Halifax, Nova Scotia

By mid-October 300 of de Ramezay's troops arrived at Annapolis Royal. The French and Indian fighters spent 21 days camped in the Annapolis area waiting for the French ships to arrive with troops and siege artillery. They cut off British land communications with Minas and attempted to stop all contact between the fort and the Acadians.

On 24 October, 42 vessels left Chebucto, with almost 50 Acadian pilots from Minas. Three hospital ships set sail for France with the most critically ill. Thirteen of the ships carried 94 officers and 1,410 soldiers to conduct the siege. Two days later, as the fleet was off Cape Negro, Nova Scotia La Jonquiere changed his mind. He ordered his ships back to France and dispatched orders to Annapolis Royal for de Ramezay to withdraw.

== Aftermath ==
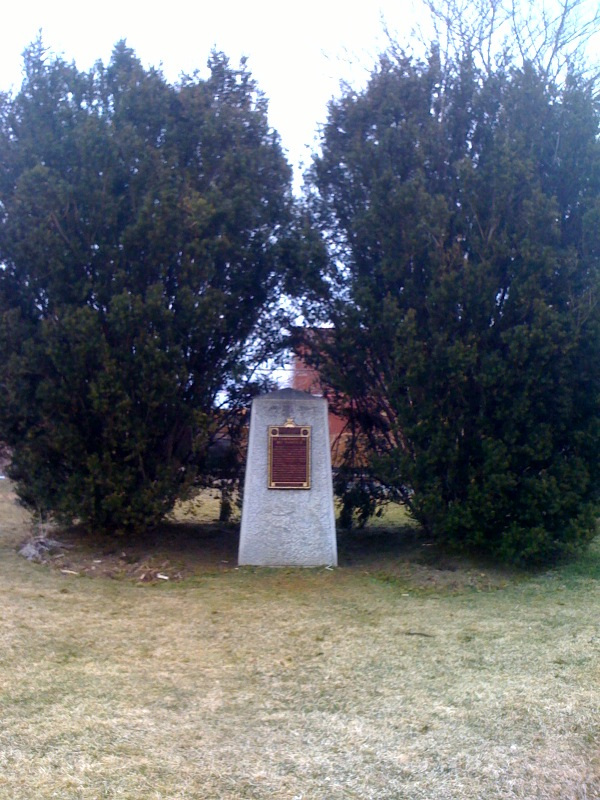
Duc d'Anville Encampment Monument, Birch Cove, Halifax, Nova Scotia

In response to the threat posed by the French expeditions, Massachusetts Bay Governor William Shirley sent Colonel Arthur Noble and hundreds of New England soldiers to secure control over Acadia and drive de Ramezay out. One of the most startling successes of de Ramezay's campaign was Nicolas Antoine II Coulon de Villiers' defeat of Colonel Noble at the Battle of Grand Pré (1747). De Villiers attacked and defeated a superior force of Noble's militia who were billeted in houses in the Acadian settlement of Grand-Pré, in the Minas Basin at the top of the Bay of Fundy.

The failure of the French expedition had serious implications for Acadian participation in the rest of the war. Any confidence that Acadians may have had that France would be victorious was shaken. After the expedition, Nova Scotia Governor Paul Mascarene told Acadians to avoid all "deluding Hopes of Returning under the Dominion of France." One French officer noted that when de Ramezay was withdrawing from Annapolis Royal, the Acadians were alarmed and disappointed, feeling they were being abandoned by the mainland French authorities.

The disease from the French crews spread among the Mi'kmaq, killing hundreds of them.

The last major engagement in the area of Annapolis Royal was during the French and Indian War in the Battle of Bloody Creek (1757).

== Legacy ==
- namesake of Duc d'Anville Elementary School, Halifax, Nova Scotia
- The site of Duc d’Anville's encampment in September 1746 was designated a National Historic Site of Canada in 1925.

== See also ==
- Military history of Nova Scotia
