= François de La Rochefoucauld (writer) =

17th-century French moralist and author of "Maximes"

François de La Rochefoucauld 2nd Duc de La Rochefoucauld
- Born: François VI, Prince de Marcillac; 15 September 1613; Paris, Kingdom of France
- Died: 17 March 1680 (aged 66); Paris, Kingdom of France
- Occupations: Writer, Courtier, Soldier
- Spouse: Andrée de Vivonne
- Children: François VII de La Rochefoucauld
- Writing career
- Language: French
- Period: Ancien Régime
- Genres: Aphorism, Memoir
- Subjects: Human nature, Amour-propre, Ethics
- Notable works: Maximes (1665); Mémoires (1662)
- Movement: Classicism
- Coat of Arms of La Rochefoucauld family "C'est mon plaisir" (It is my pleasure)

François de La Rochefoucauld, 2nd Duke of La Rochefoucauld, Prince de Marcillac (/ˈrɒʃfuːkoʊ/; French: [fʁɑ̃swa d(ə) la ʁɔʃfuko]; 15 September 1613 – 17 March 1680) was an accomplished French moralist of the era of French Classical literature and author of Maximes and Memoirs, the only two works of his dense literary œuvre published. His Maximes portrays the callous nature of human conduct, with a cynical attitude towards putative virtue and avowals of affection, friendship, love, and loyalty.

Born in Paris in 1613, at a time when the royal court was vacillating between aiding the nobility and threatening it, he was considered an exemplar of the accomplished seventeenth-century nobleman. Until 1650, he bore the title of Prince de Marcillac. His great-grandfather François III, de la Rochefoucauld, was killed in the St. Bartholomew's Day massacre, being a Huguenot.

== Early life: 1613–1629 ==
François de La Rochefoucauld was born on September 15, 1613, at Rue des Petits Champs (today in Paris's 1st arrondissement). La Rochefoucauld was given the education of a nobleman of his era, which concentrated on military exercises, hunting, court etiquette, elegance of expression and comportment, and a knowledge of the world. He was married at the age of fourteen to Andrée de Vivonne. Belonging to one of the most illustrious families of the French nobility, the young La Rochefoucauld, then prince of Marcillac, succeeded at the age of 16 (1 May 1629) his uncle Benjamin de La Rochefoucauld, count of Estissac, as camp master of the Estissac regiment.

== Military career ==
He joined the army the following year and almost immediately established himself as a public figure. He fought bravely in the annual campaigns, though his actions were never formally recognised.

Under the patronage of Madame de Chevreuse, whom he met at this time, the first of the three celebrated women who influenced his life, he joined the service of Queen Anne of Austria. In one of Madame de Chevreuse's quarrels with Cardinal Richelieu and her husband, a scheme apparently was conceived by which La Rochefoucauld was to carry her off to Brussels on horseback. Other cabals against Richelieu once resulted in La Rochefoucauld being sentenced to eight days in the Bastille, and he was occasionally required to leave the Court, exiled to his father's estates. In the power vacuum following Richelieu's death in 1642, La Rochefoucauld, among others, took an active role in urging the queen and Condé to act together against Gaston, Duke of Orléans. However, the growing reputation of Mazarin impeded the ambition of the plotters, and La Rochefoucauld's 1645 liaison with Duchess of Longueville made him irrevocably a frondeur (aristocratic rebel). He was a conspicuous figure in the 1649 siege of Paris, fought in many of the frequent military engagements, and was seriously wounded at the siege of Mardyke.

In the second Fronde, La Rochefoucauld allied himself with Condé. He used the occasion of his father's funeral in 1650 to urge the attending provincial nobility to help him attack the royalist garrison of Saumur. In the battle of the Faubourg Saint-Antoine, in 1652, he was shot through the head. It was feared that he would lose his sight, but he recovered after a year's convalescence.

For some years thereafter, he retired to his country estate of Verteuil. Although his fortune had been much reduced, in time he was able to restore it somewhat, thanks chiefly to the fidelity of Gourville, who had been in his service and who, passing into the service of Mazarin and of Condé, had acquired both wealth and influence. La Rochefoucauld did not return to court life until just before Mazarin's death, when Louis XIV was about to assume absolute power, and the aristocratic anarchy of the Fronde was over. He wrote his memoirs during this time, as did many of his prominent contemporaries.

== Salon participation ==
Somewhat earlier, La Rochefoucauld had taken his place in the salon of Madeleine de Souvré, marquise de Sablé, a member of the Marquise de Rambouillet côterie, and the founder of a kind of successor to it, whose special literary work was the writing of Sentences and Maximes. In 1662, the Dutch firm House of Elzevir surreptitiously published what purported to be his memoirs, which brought him both trouble and fame. Many of his old friends were offended. These memoirs were not a faithful copy of what he had written, and while he hastened to deny their authenticity, this was not generally believed.

Three years later, in 1665, he anonymously published the Maximes (maxims), which established his position among the men of letters of the time. At about the same date, his friendship with Marie-Madeleine Pioche de La Vergne, Comtesse de La Fayette, began, which lasted for the rest of his life. The glimpses which we have of him henceforward are chiefly from the letters of Madame de Sévigné, and though they show him suffering from gout, they are on the whole pleasant ones.

He had a circle of devoted friends and was recognized as a top-ranking moralist and man of letters. His son, the Prince de Marcillac, to whom he gave his titles and honors in 1671, enjoyed a considerable position at court. But above all La Rochefoucauld was recognized by his contemporaries, including the king, as an exemplar of the older noblesse, the nobility that existed under the great monarch before the brilliance of his reign faded. This reputation he has retained to the present day.

La Rochefoucauld's ethical views have given rise to attacks upon his works by pious moralists of later eras. Like his contemporaries, he saw politics as a chessboard for powerful players, rather than as a struggle of ideologies or a means for achieving broad social goals. He appears to have been unusually scrupulous in his personal conduct, and his lack of success in the aristocratic struggles arose more from this than from anything else.

He died in Paris on 17 March 1680.

== Literary works ==
His importance as a social and historical figure is overshadowed by his towering stature in French literature. His literary work consists of three parts –his Memoirs (Mémoires), his Maxims (Réflexions ou sentences et maximes morales), and his letters.

The Memoirs are of high interest and literary merit. A book purporting to be La Rochefoucauld's memoirs was published in the Dutch Republic whence, despite the author's protest, it continued to be reprinted for some thirty years. It has now been proved to have been pieced together from the work of half a dozen men, with scarcely a third of it being La Rochefoucauld's. Some years after La Rochefoucauld's death, a new recension appeared, still largely adulterated but with some errors corrected. This work went unchallenged for more than a century. Only in 1817 did anything like a genuine, if still imperfect, edition appear.

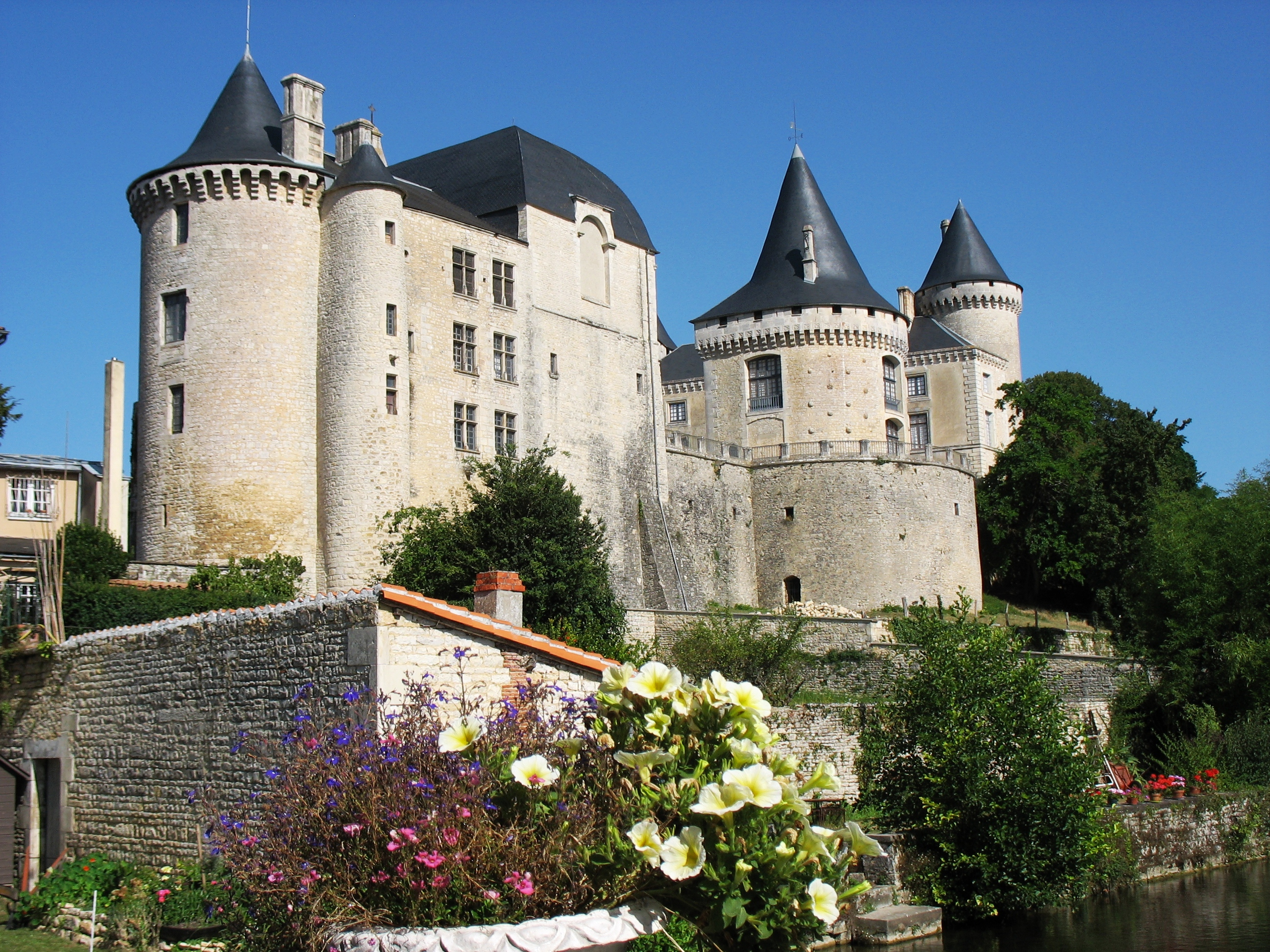
Château Verteuil, residence of La Rochefoucauld in Poitou-Charentes

However, the pithy, elegant Maximes (maxims) had no such fate. The author made frequent alterations and additions to them during his life and a few were added after his death. It is usual now to publish them in their totality of 504. The majority consist of just two or three lines, and hardly any exceed half a page. La Rochefoucauld reflects on the conduct and motives of mankind, from the point of view of a man of the world who intends not to sugar-coat his observations. In fact, in his introduction, he advises,

... the best approach for the reader to take would be to put in his mind right from the start that none of these maxims apply to himself in particular, and that he is the sole exception, even though they appear to be generalities. After that I guarantee that he will be the first to endorse them and he will believe that they do credit to the human spirit.

== Physical appearance ==
La Rochefoucauld's literary debut was his self-portrait: Portrait de La Rochefoucauld fait par lui-même, published in collection compiled in salon of Mademoiselle de Montpensier: Recueil des Portraits et éloges en vers et en prose.

I am of a medium height, active, and well-proportioned. My complexion dark, but uniform, a high forehead; and of moderate height, black eyes, small, deep set, eyebrows black and thick but well placed. I am rather embarrassed in talking of my nose, for it is neither flat nor aquiline, nor large; nor pointed: but I believe, as far as I can say, it is too large than too small, and comes down just a trifle too low. I have a large mouth, lips generally red enough, neither shaped well nor badly. I have white teeth, and fairly even. I have been told I have a little too much chin. I have just looked at myself in the glass to ascertain the fact, and I do not know how to decide. As to the shape of my face, it is either square or oval, but which I should find it very difficult to say. I have black hair, which curls by nature, and thick and long enough to entitle me to lay claim to a fine head.

== Marriage ==
On 20 January 1628, at Mirebeau-sur-Bèze, he married Andrée de Vivonne (1612–1670) only daughter and heiress of André de Vivonne, Baron of la Chataigneraie, Grand Falconer of France, and Marie Antoinette de Loménie.

== Children ==
1. François de la Rochefoucauld, 3rd Duke of La Rochefoucauld (15 June 1634 – 11 January 1714); married Jeanne Charlotte du Plessis.
2. Charles de la Rochefoucauld (22 September 1635 – 19 November 1691), Abbot of Molesme.
3. Marie Catherine de la Rochefoucauld (22 February 1637 – 5 October 1711), known as Mademoiselle de La Rochefoucauld; never married.
4. Henriette de la Rochefoucauld (15 July 1638 – 3 November 1721), known as Mademoiselle de Marsillac; never married.
5. Françoise de la Rochefoucauld (9 August 1641 – 22 March 1708), known as Mademoiselle d'Anville; never married.
6. Henri Achille de la Rochefoucauld (8 December 1642 – 19 May 1698), Abbot of Fonfroide, then of Beauport, and of La Chaise-Dieu; known as the Abbé de Marsillac.
7. Jean Baptiste de la Rochefoucauld (19 August 1646 – June 1675), known as the Chevalier de Marsillac.
8. Alexandre de la Rochefoucauld, known as the Abbé de Verteuil.

== Influence ==
Nearly all the great French critics of the 19th century wrote to some extent about La Rochefoucauld.

Philosopher Friedrich Nietzsche greatly admired La Rochefoucauld and was influenced not only by his ethics, but also his style.

The editions of La Rochefoucauld's Maximes (as the full title runs, Réflexions ou sentences et maximes morales) published in his lifetime bear the dates 1665 (editio princeps), 1666, 1671, 1675, 1678.

Previous editions were superseded by that of Jean Désiré Louis Gilbert and Jules Gourdault (1868–1883), in the series Grands Écrivains de la France, 3 vols.

A separate edition of the Maximes is the so-called Édition des bibliophiles (1870). See also the English translation of The Moral Maxims and Reflections of the Duke De La Rochefoucauld by George H. Powell (1903).

== Ancestry ==
Ancestors of François de La Rochefoucauld (writer)

8. François III, Comte de La Rochefoucauld (1521-1572)
4. François IV, Comte de La Rochefoucauld (1554-1591)
9. Silvia Pico della Mirandola (1530-1557)
2. François V, Duc de La Rochefoucauld (1588-1650)
10. Louis de Madaillan d'Estissac (>1506-1565)
5. Claude de Madaillan (1568-1608)
11. Louise de La Béraudière (c.1530->1586)
1. François VI, Duc de La Rochefoucauld
12. Guillaume du Plessis-Liancourt (1491-1550)
6. Charles du Plessis-Liancourt (1551-1620)
13. Françoise de Ternay (????-1551)
3. Gabrielle du Plessis-Liancourt (1595-1672)
14. Antoine, Lord de Pons (1510-1585)
7. Antoinette de Pons-Ribérac (c.1560-1632)
15. Marie Salomé de Montchenu (????-1598)

== Citations ==
French nobility
| Preceded by François V de La Rochefoucauld | Duke of La Rochefoucauld; 1650–1680 | Succeeded by François VII de La Rochefoucauld |
