= La Rochefoucauld, Charente =

La Rochefoucauld
- Part of La Rochefoucauld-en-Angoumois
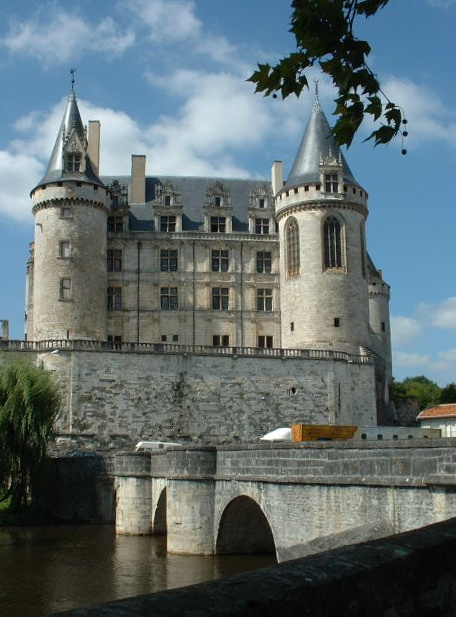
- Château de La Rochefoucauld

- Coat of arms
- Location of La Rochefoucauld
- Location within France Location within Nouvelle-Aquitaine
- Coordinates: 45°44′29″N 0°23′14″E
- Country: France
- Region: Nouvelle-Aquitaine
- Department: Charente
- Arrondissement: Angoulême
- Canton: Val de Tardoire
- Commune: La Rochefoucauld-en-Angoumois
- Area^{1}: 7.21 km^{2} (2.78 sq mi)
- Highest elevation: 136 m (446 ft)
- Lowest elevation: 75 m (246 ft)
- Population (2022): 2,929
  - Density: 406/km^{2} (1,050/sq mi)
- Time zone: UTC+01:00 (CET)
  - Summer (DST): UTC+02:00 (CEST)
- Postal code: 16110
- ^{1} French Land Register data, which excludes lakes, ponds, glaciers > 1 km^{2} (0.386 sq mi or 247 acres) and river estuaries.

La Rochefoucauld (French pronunciation: [la ʁɔʃfuko]; Limousin: La Ròcha Focaud) is a former commune of France in the Charente department, 400 kilometres (250 mi) southwest by south of Paris. On 1 January 2019, it was merged into the new commune La Rochefoucauld-en-Angoumois.

It lies very close to the line that delineated occupied France and Vichy France during World War II.

== Etymology ==
The village takes its name from the large chateau above the village, which is partially open to the public. It is also still inhabited by the Duke and Duchess.

The site was first used around 980 by Fucaldus, the younger brother of the Viscount of Limoges. Fucaldus set up a fortified camp on the rock and called it Fucaldus in rupe, or Foucauld's Rock.

The town has always been linked with the House of La Rochefoucauld.

== Population ==
Historical population

Year	Pop.	±% p.a.
1793	2,375	—
1800	2,536	+0.94%
1806	2,501	−0.23%
1821	2,661	+0.41%
1831	2,706	+0.17%
1841	2,724	+0.07%
1846	2,965	+1.71%
1851	2,845	−0.82%
1856	2,468	−2.80%
1861	2,770	+2.34%
1866	2,775	+0.04%
1872	2,621	−0.95%
1876	2,733	+1.05%
1881	2,802	+0.50%
1886	2,989	+1.30%
1891	2,849	−0.95%
1896	2,808	−0.29%

Year	Pop.	±% p.a.
1901	2,782	−0.19%
1906	2,777	−0.04%
1911	2,984	+1.45%
1921	2,565	−1.50%
1926	2,556	−0.07%
1931	2,628	+0.56%
1936	2,834	+1.52%
1946	2,835	+0.00%
1954	3,020	+0.79%
1962	3,462	+1.72%
1968	3,782	+1.48%
1975	3,699	−0.32%
1982	3,276	−1.72%
1990	3,448	+0.64%
1999	3,228	−0.73%
2022	2,929	−0.42%

Source: EHESS and INSEE (2022)

== Chateau ==
Early in the 11th century, the son of Fucaldus built a square keep, still identifiable at the heart of the present site. Two entrance towers were built from 1350, with three angle towers following, along with a heightening of the keep, in 1453. Galleries and a grand staircase, the latter attributed to designs by Leonardo da Vinci, were added in 1520. Much of the medieval building was demolished in 1615 when the courtyard was opened out, and improvements were made to honour a visit by Louis XIII. There was some rebuilding in 1760, following a fire.

Following subsidence problems affecting the keep in the 1960s, the building is currently in the midst of restoration, during which time one wing remains a family home and much of the rest is open to the public. Guided tours of the libraries are sometimes available, and there are costumes for children and adults to wear during their exploration of the rest of the public areas, which include several furnished rooms and some of the foundations within the rock.

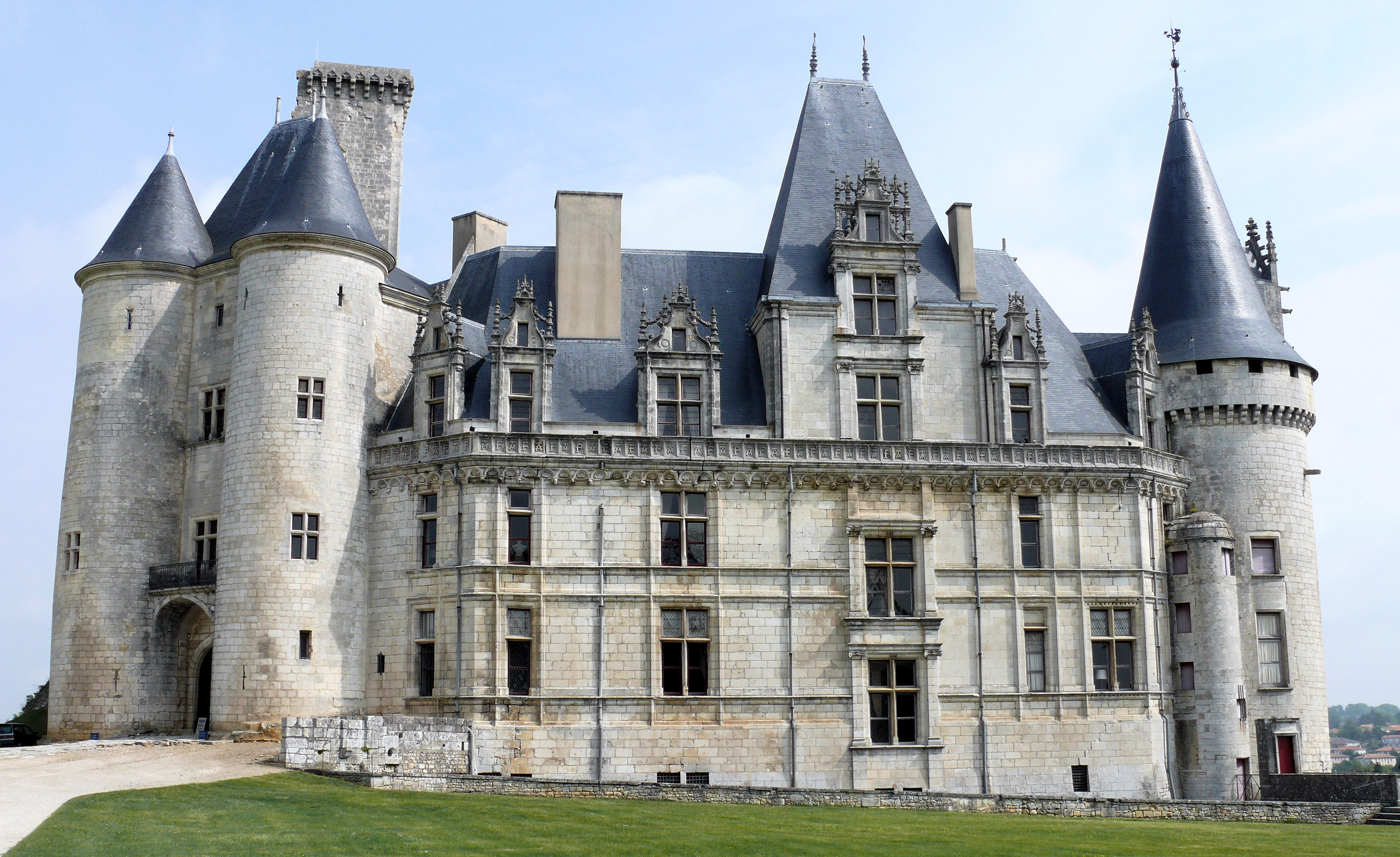
The Renaissance wing of La Rochefoucauld

== Other features ==
The commune includes a classic car dealership that is open to public daily and exhibits automative memorabilia.

In the Rivieres District, there is a large supermarket, pharmacy, vets, and petrol station.

In the old part of town is an "Abbey", public toilets, and nearby shopping streets. On the outskirts is a small chocolate factory and shop.

== See also ==
- House La Rochefoucauld
- Alexandre, comte de La Rochefoucauld (1767–1841), married Adélaïde de Pyvart de Chastullé, a San Domingo heiress allied to the Beauharnais family. Mme de La Rochefoucauld became dame d'honneur to the empress Josephine, and their eldest daughter married Francesco Borghese, a brother-in-law of Pauline Bonaparte, Princess Borghese. La Rochefoucauld became ambassador successively to Vienna (1805) and to The Hague (1808–1810), where he negotiated the union of the Kingdom of Holland with France. During the "Hundred Days" he was made a peer of France. He subsequently devoted himself to philanthropic work, and in 1822 became deputy to the Chamber of Deputies and sat with the constitutional royalists. He was again raised to the peerage in 1831.
- Ambroise-Polycarpe de La Rochefoucauld (1765–1841), soldier and minister of Charles X
- Antoine de La Rochefoucauld (before 1552 – after 1569), French knight
- Antoine de La Rochefoucauld (1862–1959), 19th century Rosicrucian
- Dominique de La Rochefoucauld (1712–1800), French bishop and cardinal
- Dominique, Prince de La Rochefoucauld-Montbel (born 1950), diplomat, Grand Hospitalier of the Order of Malta, President of the French association, Chancellor of the « Académie des Psychologues du Goût »
- Edmée de La Rochefoucauld (1896-1991), French activist
- Emmanuel, Prince de La Rochefoucauld-Montbel (1883-1974), diplomat, ambassadeur
- François III de La Rochefoucauld (1521–1572), French courtier and soldier
- François de La Rochefoucauld (cardinal) (1558–1645), French cardinal of the Catholic Church
- François VI de La Rochefoucauld (writer) (1613–1680), French author noted for his maxims and memoirs
- François de La Rochefoucauld, Marquis de Montandre (1672–1739)
- François XII Alexandre Frédéric, duc de La Rochefoucauld-Liancourt (1747–1827), social reformer
- François XIII, duc de La Rochefoucauld (1765–1848)
- Frédéric Jérôme de La Rochefoucauld (1701–1757), French cardinal of the Catholic Church, Archbishop of Bourges
- Frédéric Gaëtan, marquis de La Rochefoucauld-Liancourt (1779–1863), politician
- Jean-Baptiste Louis Frédéric de La Rochefoucauld de Roye (1707–1746), French naval commander
- Jean-Dominique de La Rochefoucauld (1931–2011), French screenwriter and television director
- Louis Alexandre de La Rochefoucauld d'Enville (1743–1792), French aristocrat and politician
- Robert de La Rochefoucauld (1923–2012), French count and special operations executive
- Communes of the Charente department
