= Helsinki Upper Secondary School of Visual Arts =

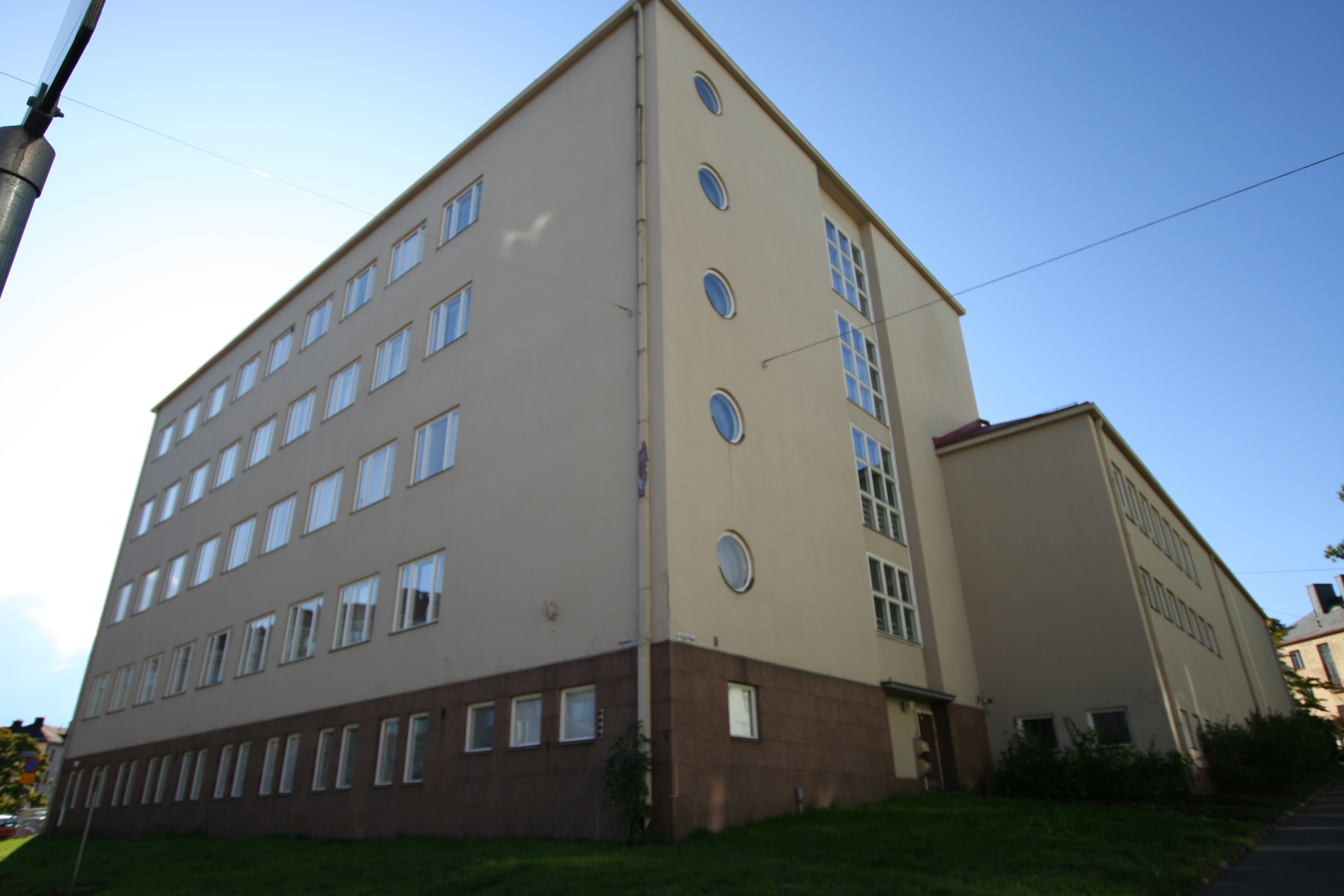
- The Upper Secondary School of Visual Arts from Pengerkatu

Location
- Torkkelinkatu 6, Helsinki
- Coordinates: 60°11′9″N 24°57′30″E

Information
- Type: Secondary school
- Principal: Pekka Lepistö
- Enrolment: approx. 620 (2021)
- Website: https://www.hel.fi/kuvatl/en

Helsinki Upper Secondary School of Visual Arts (Finnish: Helsingin kuvataidelukio) was established in 1925 and is located in Kallio in Helsinki, Finland. The school specializes in visual arts education and is maintained by the City of Helsinki. In 2021, the school had approximately 620 students.

The school has had various names throughout its history: Helsinki Second Finnish Lyceum from 1925 to 1949, Helsinki Second Lyceum from 1950 to 1977, Torkkelinkatu Lyceum from 1977 to 1979, Torkkelin Lyceum from 1979 to 1991, and since 1991, it has been known as the Helsinki Upper Secondary School of Visual Arts. The school is commonly referred to as "Torkkeli" or "Tossu", and its students are known as "Torkkelilaiset" or "Tossut".

The school has been a UNESCO school since 1990 and is part of the ASP network of schools. Helsinki Upper Secondary School of Visual Arts was the first high school in Finland to be declared a non-discrimination zone.

== Specialization in visual arts ==
In June 1985, the school began a special curriculum in visual arts education based on a decision by the Finnish Government. Prior to this, in 1981, the Helsinki City Council had approved an art-oriented focus for the school. The Ministry of Education continued the school's specialization in visual arts education on February 11, 1994.

In October 2017, Minister of Education Sanni Grahn-Laasonen granted the Helsinki Upper Secondary School of Visual Arts a national special education mission in visual arts education. The decision was based on an evaluation by the National Agency for Education and a proposal from the Ministry of Education and Culture's working group.

There are over 60 different art courses in upper secondary school, and students are required to take at least 12 of the following visual arts courses during upper secondary school:

- Visual Arts
- Graphics
- Graphic arts, graphics, graphics, ceramics
- sculpture
- drawing and painting
- textile art
- photography
- cinema
- multimedia
- design and architecture
- digital expression

Students can choose to follow one of four different pathways in their art studies:

- The visual arts pathway (drawing, painting, printmaking and sculpture)
- Visual media pathway (film, photography, image editing, folding)
- Design and architecture pathway (design, architecture, textile art, ceramics)
- Multimedia (interactive applications, game and web design)

== Building ==
The school acquired its own building on July 1, 1944, located at Torkkelinkatu 6. In addition to classrooms for general education subjects, the main building has five art classrooms, a multimedia classroom, an eExam lab, student workspaces, a lobby gallery, an auditorium, and spaces for student welfare and administration. During the 2015–2016 academic year, extensive renovations were carried out on the main building, during which the school's activities were relocated to the Mäkipellontie school building.

In addition to the main building, the school has an art house located at Pengerkatu 5 in Kallio. The art house features special facilities for photography and filmmaking, a graphics workshop and printing space, wet and dry areas for textile art, ceramics workshops, studio spaces for sculpture and painting, etc.
