= Jean Baptiste de La Rochefoucauld, Duke of Anville =

French military officer (1707-1746)

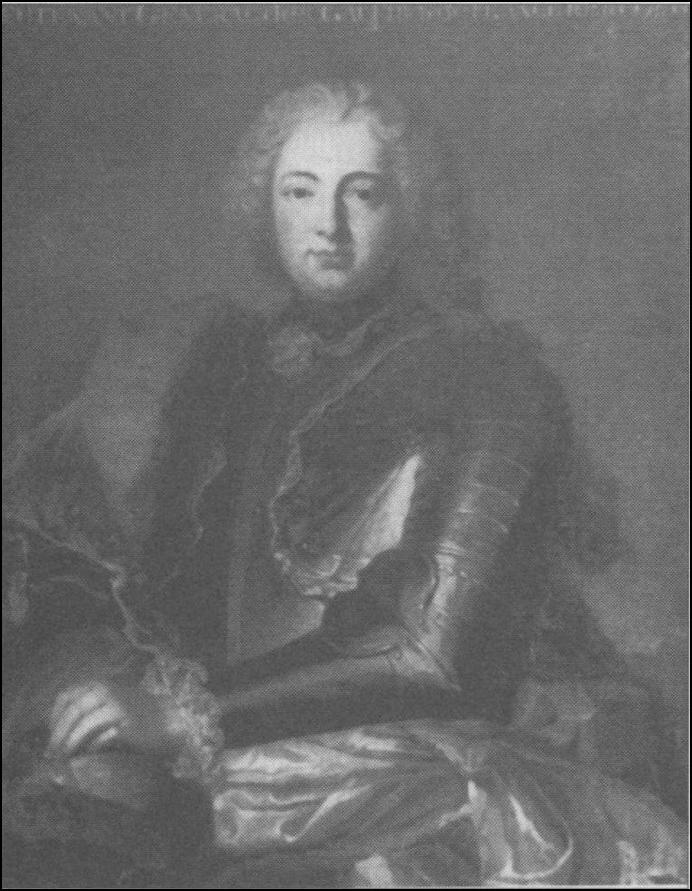
- 1740 portrait of Anville
- Born: 17 August 1707
- Died: 16 September 1746 (aged 39); Chibouctou
- Spouse: Marie-Louise Nicole de La Rochefoucauld (m. 1732; died 1746)
- Relatives: Louis Alexandre de La Rochefoucauld (son)
- Military career
- Allegiance: King of France
- Branch: French galley corps French navy
- Rank: Lieutenant General
- Conflicts: Duc d'Anville expedition

Jean-Baptiste Louis Frédéric de La Rochefoucauld de Roye, Duke of Anville (17 August 1707 – 16 September 1746) was a French military officer. He was made the Duke of Anville by Louis XV and pursued a military career in the French Navy. He is best known for leading the French fleet on the disastrous Duc d'Anville expedition to Acadia.

== Early life ==
D'Anville was born on 17 August 1707, the son of Marthe Ducasse and Louis de La Rochefoucauld, Marquis de Roye, Lieutenant-General of the Galleys. The Roye branch had been founded by Charles de La Rochefoucauld, known as de Roye (d. 1605), a younger son of François III de La Rochefoucauld, Count of La Rochefoucauld, and Charlotte de Roye, Countess of Roucy.

== Career ==
He was an officer in the galley corps (corps des galères) before transferring into the French Navy in 1734, and he was appointed lieutenant general of in January 1745.

=== Duc d'Anville Expedition ===
Although he had been appointed lieutenant general of the French navy in January 1745, the duc d'Anville did not have the proper naval training necessary to command the French fleet, which was to take part in the grand expedition the following year. In 1746, the grand expedition was organized in France under the command of the duc d'Anville. The expedition was composed 20 warships, 21 frigates, and 32 transport ships, containing 800 cannons, 3,000 soldiers, and 10,000 marines. The expedition was to retake Louisbourg and then Port Royal, then known as Annapolis Royal, from the British.

The crossing was very difficult, and it lasted 86 days. Without enough supplies, hundreds of soldiers and sailors died of scurvy and other epidemics. The French fleet was dispersed by a storm between Sable Island off Nova Scotia to as far away as the Caribbean. Some ships returned to France. Less than half of the total expedition of the duc d'Anville managed to reach Chibouctou Bay. After their arrival, the Acadiens helped take care of the soldiers. However, 1,200 men died during the crossing, and more than 1,000 died of typhoid after their arrival at Chibouctou.

The duc d'Anville was not spared, and died of a terrible epidemic, on 27 September 1746. He was buried on Georges' Island, in the Chibouctou Bay, (in front of Halifax). Two days later, vice-admiral d'Estournelles, who was second in command, committed suicide because of high fever. The corpse of the Duke was transported to Louisbourg, Île Royale (Cape Breton Island) in 1748, and finally to France.

== Personal life ==
On 28 February 1732 La Rochefoucauld married Marie-Louise Nicole de La Rochefoucauld (1716–1797), eldest daughter of Alexandre de La Rochefoucauld, 5th Duke of La Rochefoucauld and Élisabeth Bermond du Caylard, in February 1732. As his father-in-law had no surviving sons, he was granted permission by the Pope and by letters patent of the French King to transmit the ducal title to the male issue through the female line on the condition that his daughter marry a member of the La Rochefoucauld family. Jean-Baptiste de La Rochfoucauld de Roye was created Duke of Anville on 15 February 1732, a few days before the marriage. Together, Jean Baptiste and Marie-Louise-Nicole had three daughters and one son, including:

- Élisabeth-Louise de La Rochefoucauld (1740–1786), who married Louis-Antoine-Auguste de Rohan-Chabot, 6th Duke of Rohan, son of Guy Auguste de Rohan-Chabot and Yvonne Sylvie du Breil de Rays, in 1757.
- Louis-Alexandre de La Rochefoucauld (1743–1792), a member of the Académie des sciences, and the Assembly of notables in 1787, deputy of the nobility at the French States-General of 1789; he married Pauline de Gand de Mérode in 1762. After her death, he married his niece, Alexandrine Charlotte de Rohan-Chabot (daughter of his sister, Élisabeth-Louise de La Rochefoucauld, and Louis Antoine, Duke of Rohan) in 1780.

Upon his death in 1746, his son Louis Alexandre succeeded to the title Duke of Anville. On his father-in-law's death in 1762, his son also became the 6th Duke of La Rochefoucauld. When his son was killed during the September massacres in Gisors without heir, the title passed to son's his first cousin (the Duke of Anville's nephew).
