= Princess of Turenne =

The title Princess of Turenne was used by the daughters-in-law of the Dukes of Bouillon as wives of the Princes of Turenne, heirs to Bouillon and Sedan.

== House of La Tour d'Auvergne, 1691-1794 ==
Picture	Name	Father	Birth	Marriage	Became Princess	Ceased to be Princess	Death	Husband
	Anne Geneviève de Lévis	Louis Charles de Lévis (Lévis)	February 1673	16 February 1691		4 August 1692 husband's death	20 March 1727	Louis Charles de La Tour d'Auvergne; Duke of Rohan-Rohan
	Marie Armande de La Trémoille	Charles Belgique Hollande de La Trémoille (La Trémoille)	1677	1 February 1696		5 March 1717		Emmanuel Théodose
	Louise Françoise Angélique Le Tellier	LLouis François Marie Le Tellier (Le Tellier)	unknown	4 January 1718		8 July 1719; Died in childbirth		Emmanuel Théodose
	Anne Marie Christiane de Simiane	François Louis Claude Edme de Simiane, Count of Moncha (Simiane)	1698	26 May 1720		26 July 1721 husband becomes Duke of Bouillon	8 August 1722; Died in childbirth	Emmanuel Théodose
	Maria Karolina Sobieska	James Louis Sobieski (Sobieski)	25 November 1697	25 August 1723 first marriage		1 October 1723 first husband's death	8 May 1740	Frédéric Maurice Casimir
	Maria Karolina Sobieska	James Louis Sobieski (Sobieski)	25 November 1697	2 April 1724 second marriage		17 April 1730 husband becomes Duke of Bouillon	8 May 1740	Godefroy Maurice
	Louise de Lorraine	Charles Louis, Count of Marsan (Guise)	30 December 1718	27 November 1743		24 October 1771 husband becomes Duke of Bouillon	5 September 1788	Godefroy
	Maria Hedwig Eleonora of Hesse-Rotenburg	Constantine, Landgrave of Hesse-Rotenburg (Hesse-Rotenburg)	26 June 1748	17 July 1766		3 December 1792 husband becomes Duke of Bouillon	27 May 1801	Jacques Léopold
