= Louise Henriette Gabrielle of Lorraine =

Louise de Lorraine
- Duchess of Bouillon
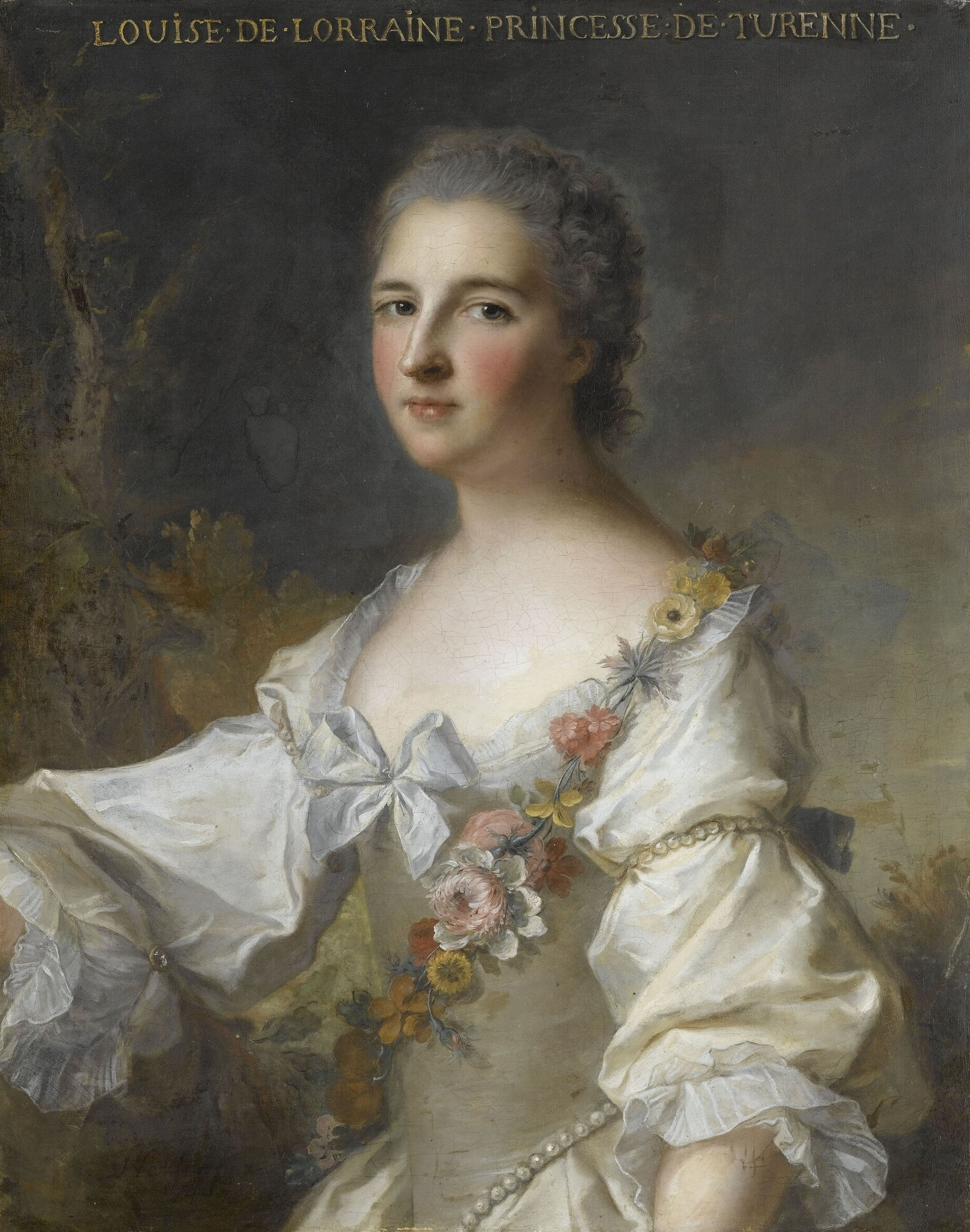
- Louise as princesse de Turenne by Nattier
- Born: 30 December 1718
- Died: 5 September 1788 (aged 69); Hôtel de Bouillon, Paris, France
- Burial: 9 September 1788; Church of Saint-Sulpice, Paris, France
- Spouse: Godefroy de La Tour d'Auvergne
- Issue: Jacques Léopold, Duke of Bouillon
Names
- Louise Henriette Gabrielle de Lorraine
- House: Guise
- Father: Charles Louis de Lorraine
- Mother: Élisabeth de Roquelaure

Louise Henriette Gabrielle of Lorraine (30 December 1718 – 5 September 1788) was a French noblewoman and member of the House of Guise. She married into the House of La Tour d'Auvergne and was Duchess of Bouillon.

At court she was associated with the princesses combinées.

== Biography ==
Born to Charles Louis de Lorraine, Count of Marsan, Prince of Mortagne, and his wife Élisabeth de Roquelaure, she was the second of four children. Her younger brother, Gaston Jean Baptiste Charles, was the husband of Marie Louise de Rohan, future governess of Louis XVI and his siblings. Gaston died of smallpox, aged twenty two. Her younger brother was Camille, Prince of Marsan.

She was known simply as Louise. Styled Mademoiselle de Marsan prior to her marriage, as a male line descendant of the House of Lorraine she was entitled to the style of Highness.

She was a Canoness of the prestigious Remiremont Abbey in Remiremont, in the Vosges in Lorraine. Remiremont had been closely related to the Lorraine's for centuries. She was nominated as Canoness in 1733.

Louise was engaged to Godefroy de La Tour d'Auvergne, only son and heir of Charles Godefroy de La Tour d'Auvergne and his Polish born wife Maria Karolina Sobieska. The couple were married on 27 November 1743. Her husband, as heir to the Duchy of Bouillon, was styled prince de Turenne; as such, Louise became the Princess of Turenne.

The couple's marriage was officiated by the Cardinal d'Auvergne, her husband's cousin; they were wed in the Hôtel of her younger brother, Louis Camille de Lorraine. Her husband was nine years younger than she.

The couple were the parents of four children, two of which survived infancy. At the death of her father-in-law, Charles Godefroy de La Tour d'Auvergne, her husband became the Duke of Bouillon.

She died in at the Hôtel de Lordat in Paris, aged 69, over the night of 4–5 September 1788.

The year after her death, her husband married again, to Marie Françoise Henriette de Banastre, a girl who was some 47 years younger than he and was a daughter of one of his footmen.

Louise was buried at the Church of Saint-Sulpice in Paris on 9 September. At her husband's death in 1792, her son succeeded as duke of Bouillon. Her son had no children, and thus the House of La Tour d'Auvergne became extinct.

She has no known surviving descendants; the Princes of Guéméné (members of the House of Rohan) claim the Duchy of Bouillon via Louise's sister in law Marie Louise de La Tour d'Auvergne who married the Prince of Guéméné and has descendants in modern Austria.

== Issue ==
- Jacques Leopold Charles Godefroy de La Tour d'Auvergne (15 January 1746 – 7 February 1802) married Marie Hedwig of Hesse-Rotenburg, grand daughter of Ernest Leopold of Hesse-Rotenburg and Eleonore of Löwenstein-Wertheim-Rochefort; no issue;
- Charles Louis Godefroi de La Tour d'Auvergne, Prince of Auvergne (22 September 1749 – 23 October 1767) never married;
- Louis Henri de La Tour d'Auvergne, Duke of Albret (20 February 1753 – 7 March 1753) died in infancy;
- X de La Tour d'Auvergne (3 April 1756) stillborn daughter.

== Ancestry ==
Ancestors of Louise Henriette Gabrielle of Lorraine

8. Henri de Lorraine, Count of Armagnac, of Harcourt and of Charny
4. Charles de Lorraine, Count of Marsan
9. Marguerite-Philippe du Cambout
2. Charles Louis de Lorraine, Count of Marsan
10. Henri Goyon de Matignon, Count of Thorigny
5. Catherine Thérèse de Goyon de Matignon; Aunt of Jacques I, Prince of Monaco
11. Marie Françoise Le Tellier, Dame of La Luthumière
1. Louise de Lorraine
12. Gaston de Roquelaure, Duke of Roquelaure
6. Antoine Gaston de Roquelaure, Duke of Roquelaure
13. Charlotte Marie de Daillon, Lady of Lude
3. Élisabeth de Roquelaure
14. Guy Urbain de Laval, Marquis of Laval-Lezay
7. Marie Louise de Laval
15. Françoise de Sesmaisons
