= Jacques Léopold de La Tour d'Auvergne =

Jacques Léopold
- Duke of Bouillon
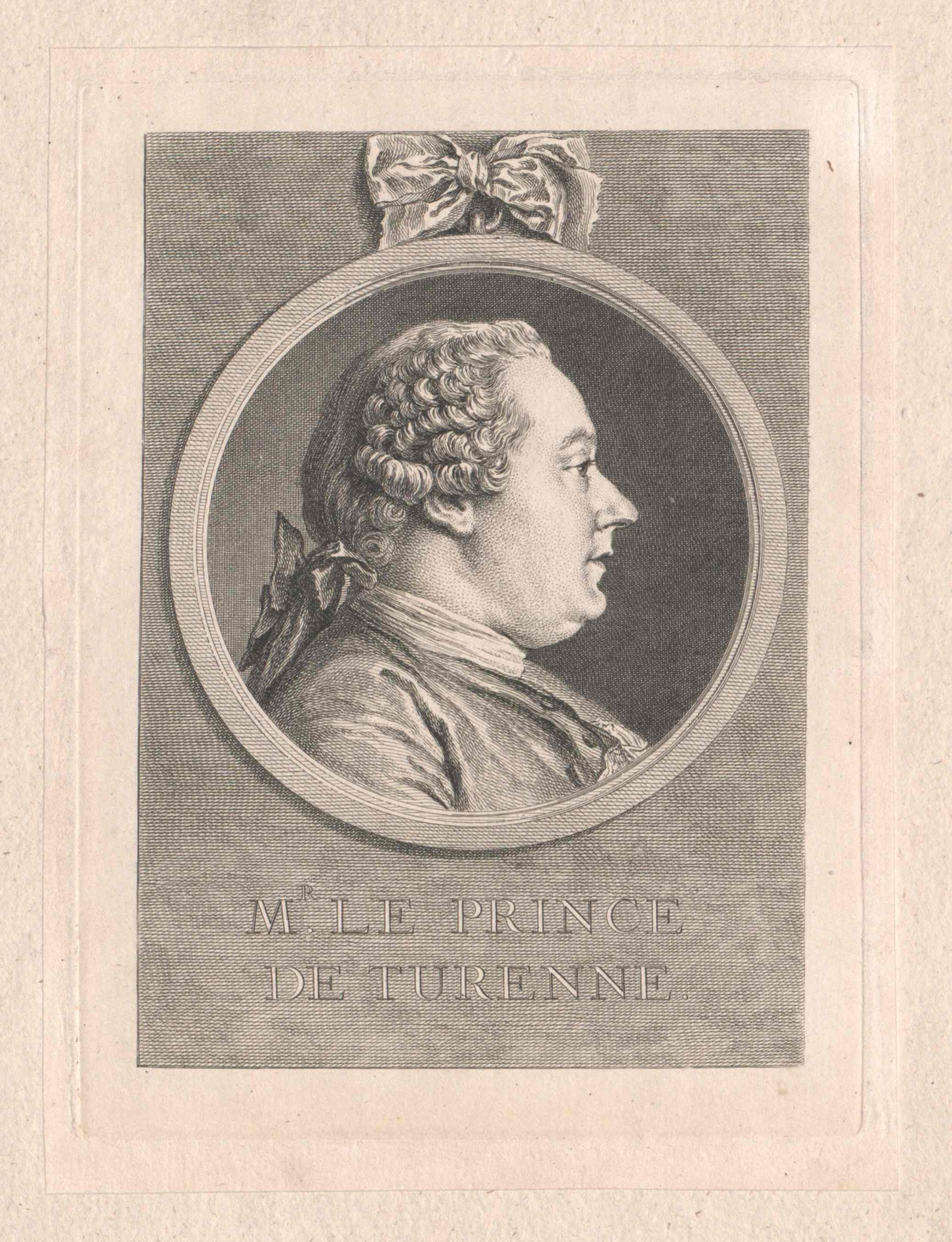
- Born: 15 January 1746
- Died: 7 February 1802 (aged 56)
- Spouse: Hedwig of Hesse-Rotenburg (m. 1766; died 1801)
Names
- Jacques Léopold Charles Godefroy de La Tour d'Auvergne
- House: La Tour d'Auvergne
- Father: Godefroy de La Tour d'Auvergne
- Mother: Louise Henriette Gabrielle de Lorraine

Jacques Léopold de La Tour d'Auvergne (Jacques Léopold Charles Godefroy; 15 January 1746 – 7 February 1802) was a member of the House of La Tour d'Auvergne, the sovereign dukes of Bouillon. He was the last Duke of Bouillon succeeding his father in 1792.

== Early life ==
Jacques Léopold Godefroy de La Tour d'Auvergne, Duc de Bouillon was born in 1746. He was the eldest and only surviving of four sons born to the Godefroy de La Tour d'Auvergne, Duke of Bouillon and Princess Louise Henriette Gabrielle de Lorraine-Marsan. From 1771, Jacques Léopold was styled as the Prince of Turenne as the heir of the Duchy of Bouillon.

His first cousin was Henri Louis de Rohan-Guéméné, the scandalous Prince of Guéméné. (Note: son of his aunt Princess Marie Louise de La Tour d'Auvergne and Jules, Prince of Rohan-Guéméné)

== Personal life ==
He married Princess Hedwig of Hesse-Rheinfels-Rotenburg, daughter of Konstantin, Landgrave of Hesse-Rheinfels-Rotenburg and his wife Countess Marie Sophia Theresia Hedwig Eva of Starhemberg, widowed Princess of Nassau-Siegen and sister of Georg Adam, Prince of Starhemberg. Hewdig was grand daughter of Ernest Leopold, Landgrave of Hesse-Rheinfels-Rotenburg and Princess Eleonore of Löwenstein-Wertheim-Rochefort and Konrad Sigmund, Count of Starhemberg and Princess Maria Leopoldine of Löwenstein-Wertheim-Rochefort. The couple were married at Carlsburg on 17 July 1766 but had no children.

== Later life ==
He lived at the Château de Navarre, his French estate, prior to the revolution and succeeded his father in 1792. During the collapse of the Ancien Régime, the duchy of Bouillon was taken from him in 1794 and absorbed into France in October 1795. He was known as citoyen Léopold La Tour d'Auvergne during the revolution. However, in 1800, he recovered the duchy but was obliged to pay off debts to the tune of three million livres.

Jacques was the last Duke of Bouillon, and following the Napoleonic Wars the duchy was absorbed into the Grand Duchy of Luxembourg (Bouillon later became part of Belgium). He had no known descendants. The Princes of Guéméné today claim the Duchy of Bouillon as their own due to the marriage of Marie Louise (his aunt) and Jules de Rohan, Prince of Guéméné.

Jacques Léopold Godefroy de La Tour d'Auvergne, Duc de Bouillon died in 1802.

== Ancestry ==
Ancestors of Jacques Léopold de La Tour d'Auvergne

8. Emmanuel Théodose de La Tour d'Auvergne
4. Charles Godefroy de La Tour d'Auvergne
9. Marie Armande Victoire de La Trémouille
2. Godefroy de La Tour d'Auvergne
10. Jakub Ludwik Sobieski
5. Maria Karolina Sobieska
11. Countess Palatine Hedwig Elisabeth Amelia of Neuburg
1. Jacques Léopold de La Tour d'Auvergne
12. Charles de Lorraine, Count of Marsan
6. Charles Louis de Lorraine, Count of Marsan
13. Catherine Thérèse de Goyon de Matignon
3. Louise Henriette Gabrielle de Lorraine
14. Antoine Gaston de Roquelaure
7. Elisabeth de Roquelaure
15. Marie Louise de Laval
