= List of duchesses of Bouillon =

There have been duchesses of Bouillon, in present-day Belgium, since the tenth century.

== Lady of Bouillon ==
=== Ardennes-Bouillon dynasty, ?-1100 ===
Sold to the Bishopric of Liège

=== House of La Marck, ?-1588 ===
Picture	Name	Father	Birth	Marriage	Became Duchess	Ceased to be Duchess	Death	Spouse
	Jeanne de Marley	-	-	22 June 1449	-	1 February 1487 husband's death	1500	Robert I
	Catherine de Croÿ	Philippe de Croÿ, Count of Chimay (Croÿ)	-	1491		1536 husband's death	1544	Robert II
	Guillemette of Saarbrücken, Countess of Braine	Robert IV of Saarbrücken, Count of Roucy (Saarbrücken)	1490	1 April 1510	1536 husband's accession	21 December 1536 husband's death	20 March 1571	Robert Fleuranges
	Françoise de Brézé, Countess of Maulévrier	Louis de Brézé, seigneur d'Anet (Brézé)	1515	5 January 1539		4 November 1556 husband's death	14 October 1557	Robert IV
	Françoise de Bourbon	Louis III de Bourbon, Duke of Montpensier (Bourbon)	1539	7 February 1558		2 December 1574 husband's death	17 May 1587	Henri Robert
	Charlotte de La Marck, Suo jure	Henri Robert de La Marck (La Marck)	5 November 1574	19 November 1591		15 May 1594		Henri

=== House of La Tour d'Auvergne, 1594–1794 ===
Picture	Name	Father	Birth	Marriage	Became Duchess	Ceased to be Duchess	Death	Spouse
	Elisabeth of Nassau	William the Silent (Orange-Nassau)	26 April 1577	16 April 1595		25 March 1623 husband's death	3 September 1642	Henri
	Countess Eleonora van den Berg	Graaf Frederik van den Bergh (van den Bergh)	6 May 1613	1 February 1634		9 August 1652 husband's death	24 July 1657	Frédéric Maurice
	Marie Anne Mancini	Lorenzo Mancini (Mancini)	1649	20 April 1662		20 June 1714		Godefroy Maurice
	Anne Marie Christiane de Simiane	François Louis Claude Edme de Simiane, Count of Moncha (de Simiane)	1698	26 May 1720	26 July 1721 husband's accession	8 August 1722		Emmanuel Théodose
	Louise Henriette Françoise de Lorraine	Joseph, Count of Harcourt (Guise)	1707	21 March 1725		17 April 1730 husband's death	31 March 1737	Emmanuel Théodose
	Maria Karolina Sobieska	James Louis Sobieski (Sobieski)	25 November 1697	2 April 1724	17 April 1730 husband's accession	8 May 1740		Charles Godefroy
	Louise Henriette Gabrielle de Lorraine	Charles Louis de Lorraine, Count of Marsan (Guise)	30 December 1718	27 November 1743	24 October 1771 husband's accession	5 September 1788		Godefroy
	Marie-Françoise Henriette de Banastre	Louis Alexandre Henri de Banastre, seigneur de Parfondeval (de Banastre)	6 February 1775	23 May 1789		3 December 1792 husband's death	3 May 1816	Godefroy
	Maria Hedwig Eleonora of Hesse-Rotenburg	Constantine, Landgrave of Hesse-Rotenburg (Hesse-Rotenburg)	26 June 1748	17 July 1766	3 December 1792 husband's accession	1794; Bouillon absorbed into the French Republic	27 May 1801	Jacques Léopold
