= Camille, Prince of Marsan =

French nobleman and Prince of Lorrain

Camille
- "Prince of Marsan"
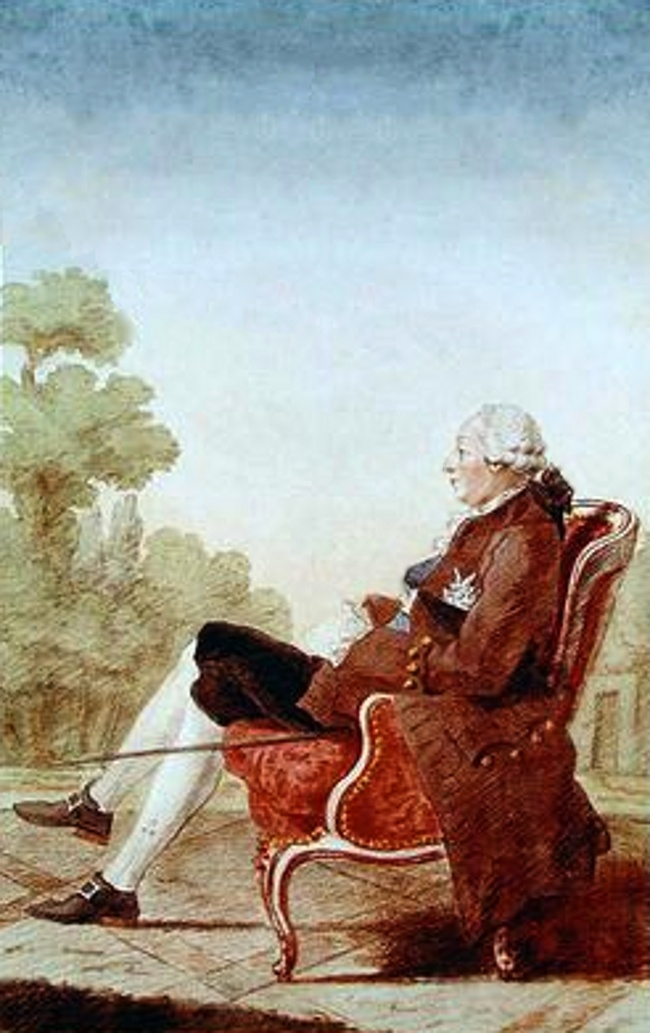
- Camille by Carmontelle
- Born: 18 December 1725
- Died: 12 April 1780 (aged 54); Hôtel de Bouillon, Paris, France
- Spouse: Hélène Julie Rosalie Mancini
Names
- Louis Camille de Lorraine
- House: House of Guise
- Father: Charles Louis de Lorraine
- Mother: Élisabeth de Roquelaure

Camille de Lorraine (Louis Camille; 18 December 1725 – 12 April 1780) was a French nobleman and Prince of Lorraine. He was known as the Prince of Marsan and, after the death of his father, was the Count of Marsan.

== Early life and ancestry ==
Coat of Arms of Prince Camille de Lorraine, Prince and Count of Marsan

Born the youngest child of four of Charles Louis de Lorraine, Prince of Pons and his wife, Élisabeth de Roquelaure. His mother was a daughter of the famous Maréchal de Roquelaure.

As a member of the House of Guise, a cadet branch of the House of Lorraine, he was a Foreign Prince in France and as such was given the style of Highness. He was the last male of the Lorraine Counts of Marsan.

He was the Prince of Puyguilhem, but never used the title.

Known simply as le prince Camille, he was styled as the Prince of Marsan, his older brother Gaston was the Count of Marsan. His brother died of smallpox in 1743 and the county of Marsan reverted to the family. Even after his father's death in 1755, Camille was still known as the prince de Marsan.

== Biography ==
Marsan was created a knight of the Order of the Holy Spirit, the most prestigious decoration of the Ancien régime on 2 February 1756. His father had also been a knight of the order. From 1778, he was the owner of the Hôtel de Boisgelin in Paris. The Hôtel de Boisgelin (sometimes known as the Hôtel de La Rochefoucauld-Doudeauville) but in 1779 he sold the property to Marie de Boisgelin, Canoness of Remiremont who later gave it to her brother Jean de Dieu-Raymond de Cucé de Boisgelin.

His older sister Louise Henriette Gabrielle married the Duke of Bouillon. His older brother, Gaston Jean Baptiste Charles married Marie Louise de Rohan, future Governess of the Children of France.

Camille himself married Princess Hélène Julie Rosalie Mancini (1740–1780), styled as Mademoiselle de Nevers. She was the daughter of Louis Jules Mancini Mazarini, Duke of Never, a man of letter and his wife Hélène Françoise Angélique Phélypeaux de Pontchartrain (1715–1781), herself a daughter of Jérôme Phélypeaux de Pontchartrain. She was a widow of Louis Marie Fouquet, a grandson of Nicolas Fouquet. The couple married in 1759 but had no issue. Hélène died in November 1780.

== Death ==
He died at the Hôtel de Bouillon in Paris. The Hôtel was the Parisian residence of his brother in law the Duke of Bouillon. His sister died there some eight years later.
