= Charles, Count of Marsan =

French nobleman

Charles
- Count of Marsan
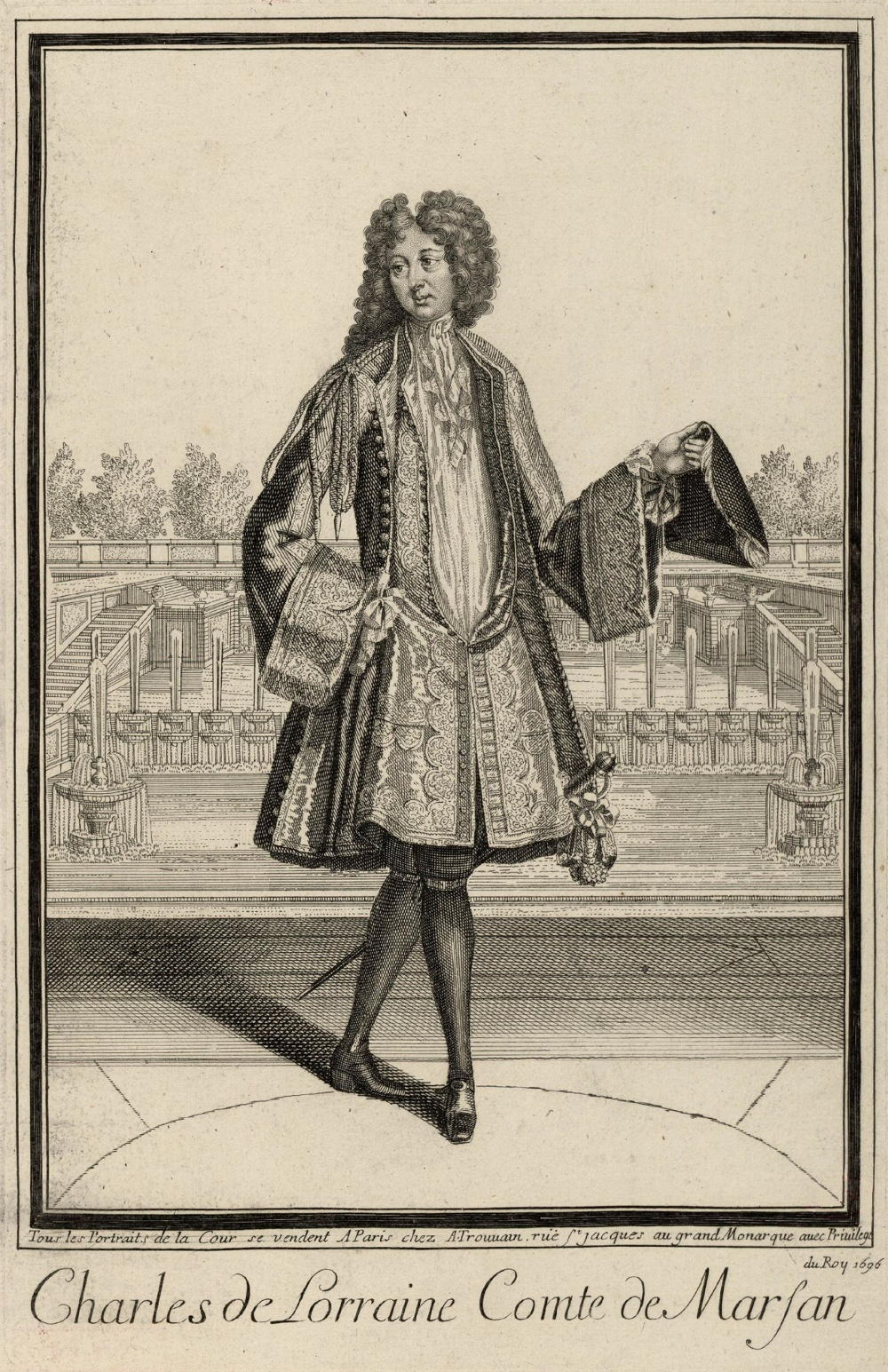
- Full name: Charles de Lorraine
- Born: 8 April 1648
- Died: 13 November 1708 (aged 60); Paris, France
- Noble family: Lorraine; Guise
- Spouses: Marie d'Albret, Dame de Pons, Countess of Moissens, Princess of Mortagne (m. 1683–1692); Catherine de Goyon de Matignon (m. 1696–1699)
- Issue Detail: Charles Louis, Count of Marsan; Jacques Henri, Chevalier de Lorraine
- Father: Henri de Lorraine, Count of Harcourt
- Mother: Marguerite-Philippe du Cambout

Charles de Lorraine (8 April 1648 – 13 November 1708) was the viscount, then count of Marsan. After 1682, he also styled himself prince of Pons and sovereign of Bédeille. He was the youngest son of Henri de Lorraine, Count of Harcourt and brother of the chevalier de Lorraine and Louis de Lorraine, Count of Armagnac.

== Biography ==
=== Early life ===
Charles was the youngest son of Henri de Lorraine, Count of Harcourt and Marguerite-Philippe du Cambout. As a member of the House of Guise, a cadet branch of the House of Lorraine, he held the rank of prince étranger at the court of France. He was given an appanage in the form of the Viscounty (later County) of Marsan at birth. At his death, it was given to his eldest son Charles Louis, also known by the courtesy title the prince of Pons.

The youngest of six children (five sons and one daughter), Charles' siblings were: Armande Henriette, Abbess of Notre-Dame de Soissons; Louis, Count of Armagnac, Grand Squire of France; Philippe, Chevalier de Lorraine, lover of the king's brother, the duke of Orléans; Alphonse Louis, Abbot of Royaumont; and Raimond Bérenger, Abbot of Faron de Meaux.

=== Exile in Rome ===
In early 1670, Marsan's brother, the chevalier de Lorraine, was arrested and imprisoned, first near Lyons, and then in the island fortress of the Château d'If. In February of that year, at the insistence of the Duke of Orléans, King Louis XIV reduced Lorraine's sentence to exile in Rome; Marsan was exiled with him for defending his brother. Marsan left the French court a few days before April 14; he and Lorraine arrived together in Rome at the beginning of May 1670.

At the end of July 1670, Marsan sneaked out of Rome and entered France, attempting to rejoin the army. Although the king ordered him back to Italy, Marsan managed to spend the rest of the summer in Aix, and returned to Rome only in September.

The Lorraine brothers were allowed back to the French court in 1672.

=== Scandal of 1682 ===
June 1682 saw a sexual scandal shake the French court, when it came to light that there was a group of young men at court who "pushed their debauchery to horrible excesses," so that "the court had become a little Sodom." The scandal was compounded by the publication the same summer of the pamphlet La France devenue italienne ("France become Italian"), titled in reference to the "Italian vice," a contemporary term for homosexuality. The pamphlet describes a homosexual confraternity of young men at court who had renounced the company of women; historian Joan Pieragnoli, however, argues that such a confraternity never existed, and historian Jonathan Spangler is skeptical. The scandal resulted in the removal from court of a number of prominent noblemen.

The king quickly suspected Marsan's involvement, and the investigation conducted on behalf of the king by Louis François du Bouchet, Marquis de Sourches concluded that Marsan was one of the men involved in the group and that he had conspired to corrupt the king's son, the Dauphin, though it is unclear whether this corruption was intellectual, sexual, religious, or some combination of these. In his memoirs, Sourches writes:

The King said [...] that he had loved and esteemed M. de Marsan, but that he could no longer view him with anything but horror and that he was a monster who had wished to corrupt his son [the Dauphin].

Marsan's nephew, Henri, Count of Brionne, and his elder brother, the Chevalier de Lorraine, were also implicated in the scandal.

In her letters, Elizabeth Charlotte, Duchess of Orléans accused Marsan of having been involved, along with Lorraine, in the seduction of the young count of Vermandois, the legitimized son of Louis XIV and Louise de La Vallière; however, Vermandois himself accused only Lorraine. In contrast with Orléans, Ezekiel, Baron von Spanheim reports that the king's complaints were with Marsan's having attempted to "give the Dauphin a bad impression of the government."

Using his influence with the king, the eldest Lorraine brother, the count of Armagnac, saved his son from exile, but he could not save Lorraine nor Marsan. Although Marsan was not exiled like his brother, "he was nevertheless lost in the mind of the King, never to return."

=== Marriages ===
Following the scandal of 1682, the king hastened to marry off many of queer men who had been involved, including Marsan. Only a month after the scandal, the king approved Marsan's marriage to the wealthy heiress Marie d'Albret, Dame de Pons, Countess of Moissens, Princess of Mortagne (1650–1692); the king also signed their marriage contract. Marsan and Albret were married on 1 March 1683. They had no issue.

Marsan's second marriage was to Catherine Thérèse de Goyon de Matignon (1662–1699), a daughter of Henri Goyon and Marie Françoise Le Tellier, herself a sister of François Michel Le Tellier de Louvois. She was an aunt of Jacques I, Prince of Monaco. Catherine had previously been married to Jean-Baptiste Colbert de Seignelay, son of Jean-Baptiste Colbert, and was already the mother of four children.

The couple were married on 22 September 1696 and they had three children, two of whom survived infancy. Catherine died in childbirth in 1699 with her last child, a daughter named Marie, who died some nine days after birth. Marsan never remarried.

Having earned a reputation for being an "avaricious pursuer of wealthy widows," Saint-Simon records that Marsan "lived as long as he could at the expense" of women and widows, particularly his two wealthy wives.

=== Military career ===
In February 1684, in anticipation of the upcoming campaign in Flanders that spring, the king made Marsan his aide-de-camp.

=== Honours ===
Marsan was created a knight of the Order of the Holy Spirit, the most prestigious military knighthood of the Ancien Régime, on 31 December 1688 at Versailles. His two brothers, the Count of Armagnac and the Chevalier de Lorraine, were also created members of the order on the same day.

In 1698, Marsan was chosen, along with a contingent of other Lorraine princes étrangers (including his brother, the count of Armagnac), to accompany Élisabeth Charlotte d'Orléans to meet her new husband, Leopold, Duke of Lorraine.

=== Properties ===
Marsan maintained apartments at Versailles in the Aile du Nord, except between 1692 and 1696, when Albret and Marsan lived in the Corps Central of the palace.

=== Death ===
Marsan died in Paris on 13 November 1708, at the age of 60. Saint-Simon records three to four decades after the event that he died of starvation resulting from paralysis of the throat, which prevented him from swallowing.

His last male line descendant was Camille, Prince of Marsan, who was also the last count of Marsan following the death of his father, Charles Louis de Lorraine. Marsan's last female line descendant, through his granddaughter Louise Henriette Gabrielle (Duchess of Bouillon by marriage), was her only surviving son Jacques Léopold de La Tour d'Auvergne, the last Duke of Bouillon.

== Issue ==
With Catherine Thérèse de Goyon de Matignon, Marsan had three children:

- Charles Louis de Lorraine, Count of Marsan, Prince of Pons (21 October 1696 – 2 November 1755), married Élisabeth de Roquelaure and had issue
- Jacques Henri de Lorraine, Chevalier de Lorraine (24 March 1698 – 2 June 1734) married Anne Marguerite Gabrielle de Beauvau had no issue; died in the Siege of Philippsburg
- Marie de Lorraine (7 December 1699 – 16 December 1699) died in infancy
