= House of Sobieski =

Polish noble family

Sobieski
- Janina
- Parent house: Wiśniowieccy; Żółkiewski; Radziwiłł; Lubomirscy
- Country: Poland
- Founded: 1674 Free election
- Current head: Extinct
- Final ruler: John III Sobieski
- Titles: King of Poland; Grand Duke of Lithuania; Grand Duke of Ruthenia; Grand Duke of Prussia; Grand Duke of Masovia; Grand Duke of Samogitia; Grand Duke of Livonia; Grand Duke of Smolensk; Grand Duke of Kiev; Grand Duke of Volhynia; Grand Duke of Podlasie; Grand Duke of Severia; Grand Duke of Chernihiv; Electress of Bavaria; Princesses of Turenne; Duchess of Bouillon; Queen consort of England; Queen consort of Ireland; Queen consort of Scotland
- Estates: Poland, Lithuania, Ukraine, Belarus

The House of Sobieski (plural: Sobiescy, feminine form: Sobieska) was a prominent magnate family of Polish nobility in the 16th and 17th centuries, from which the King of Poland and Grand Duke of Lithuania Jan III Sobieski originated. The family used the Janina coat of arms.

== History ==
According to the family's legend, it traced its lineage to a Polish duke, Leszek II the Black. Another family legend said that they were the descendants of Duke Sobiesław, the son of Leszko III, a legendary ruler of the Popielids dynasty. The family reached the height of its power and importance in the late 16th and 17th centuries, when one of its members was elected King of Poland: John III Sobieski (Jan III Sobieski). The last male member of the branch of the family that began with John's grandfather, Marek Sobieski, in the 16th century was Jakub Ludwik Sobieski (1667–1737).

According to an alternative version provided by the 18th century chronicle writer Samiilo Velychko, Sobieskis originated from local boyar Sobko from Galicia (Halych region) who converted into the Roman Catholicism.

== Coat of arms ==
The Sobieski family used the Janina coat of arms, and their motto was Vel cum hoc, vel super hoc.

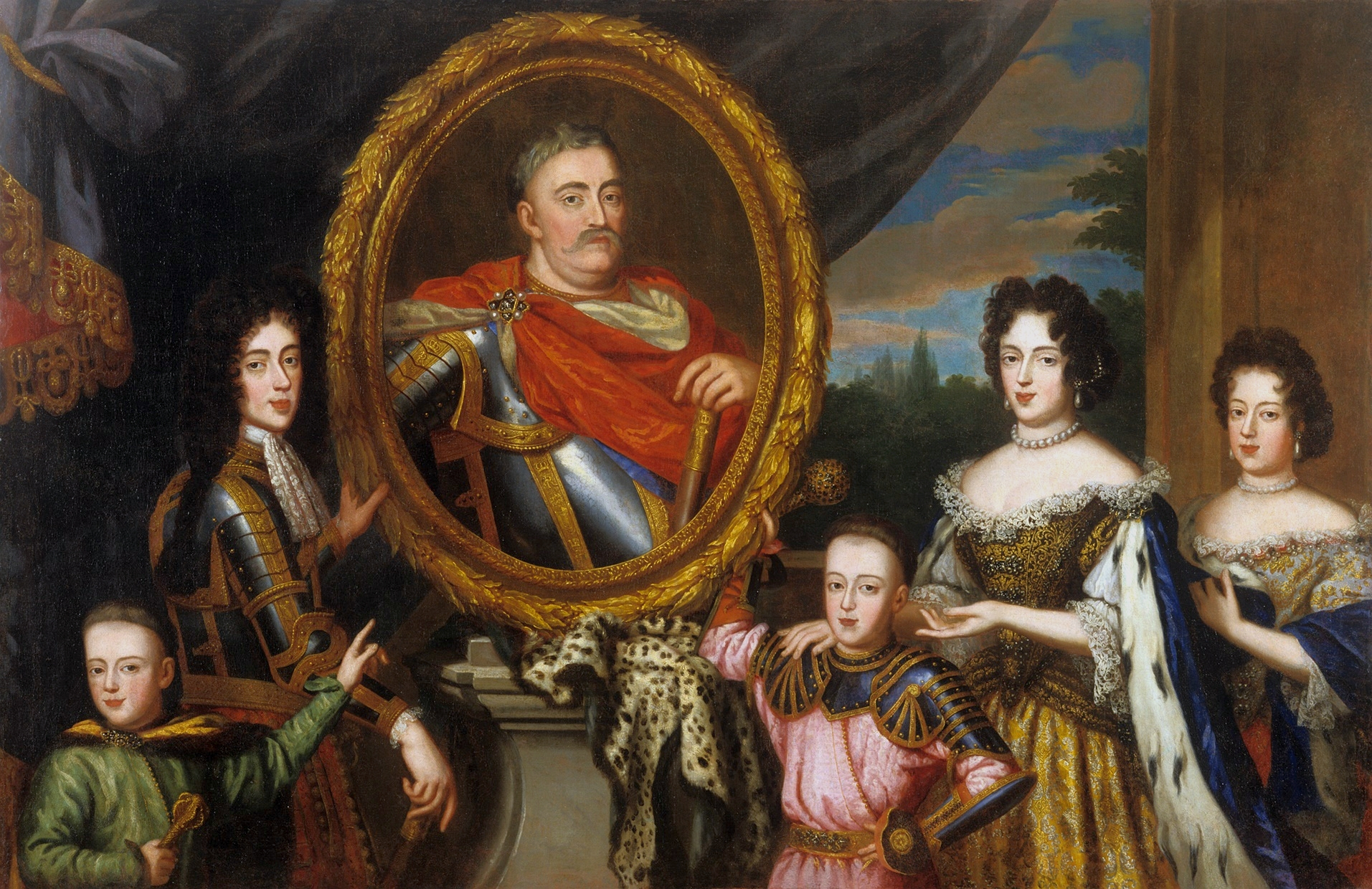
Apotheosis of John III Sobieski surrounded by his family.

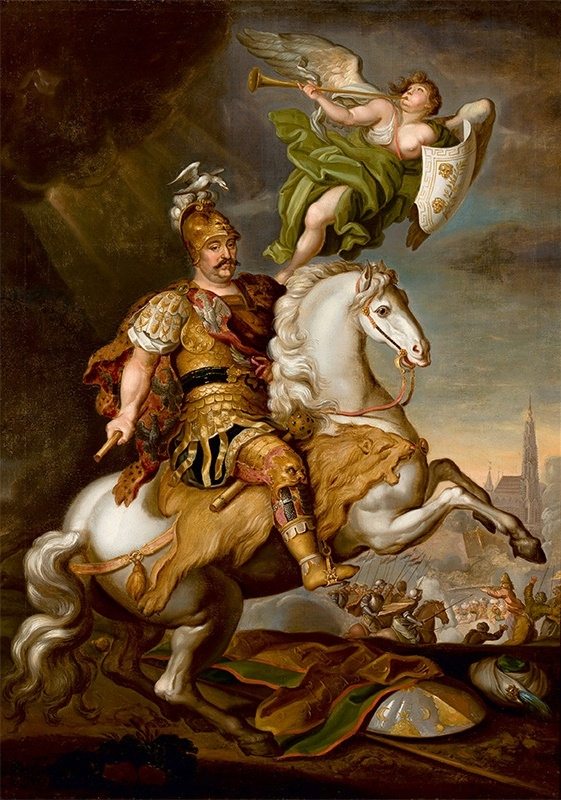
John III Sobieski, the victor of the Battle of Vienna.

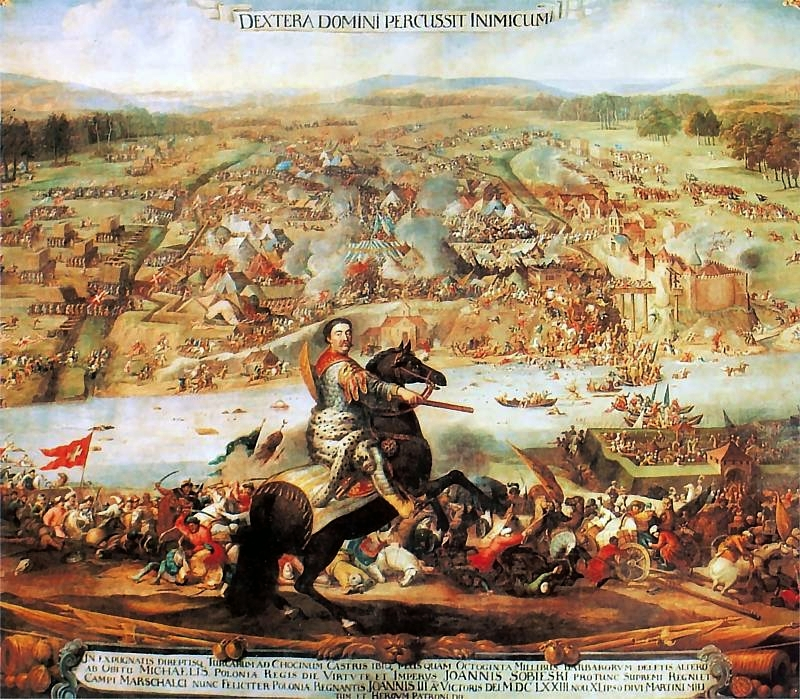
John III Sobieski, the victor of the Battle of Chocim.

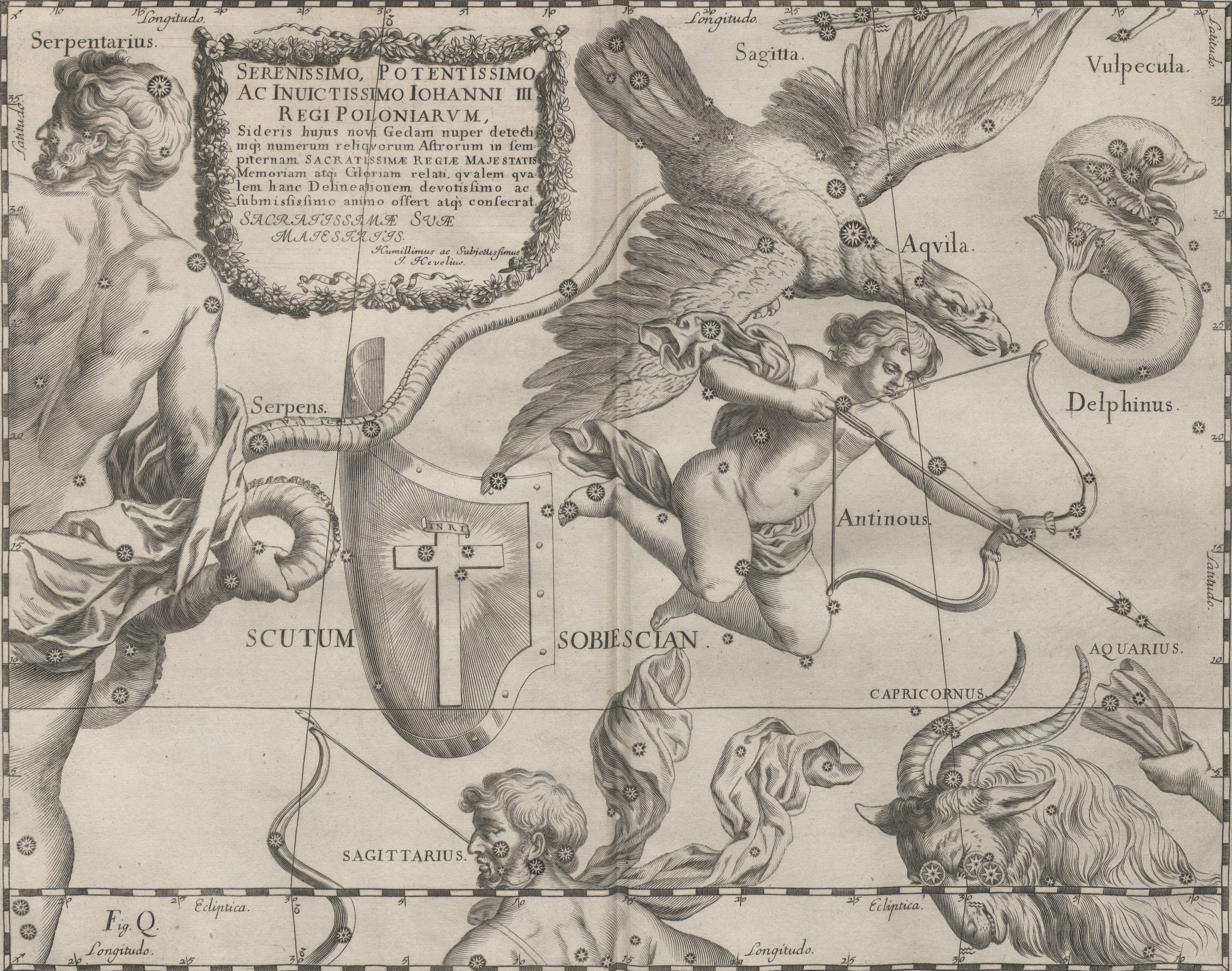
Scutum Sobiescianum, a constellation created by Jan Heweliusz to commemorate the victory of the Polish forces led by King John III in the Battle of Vienna.

Coat of Arms of John III Sobieski as the King of Poland

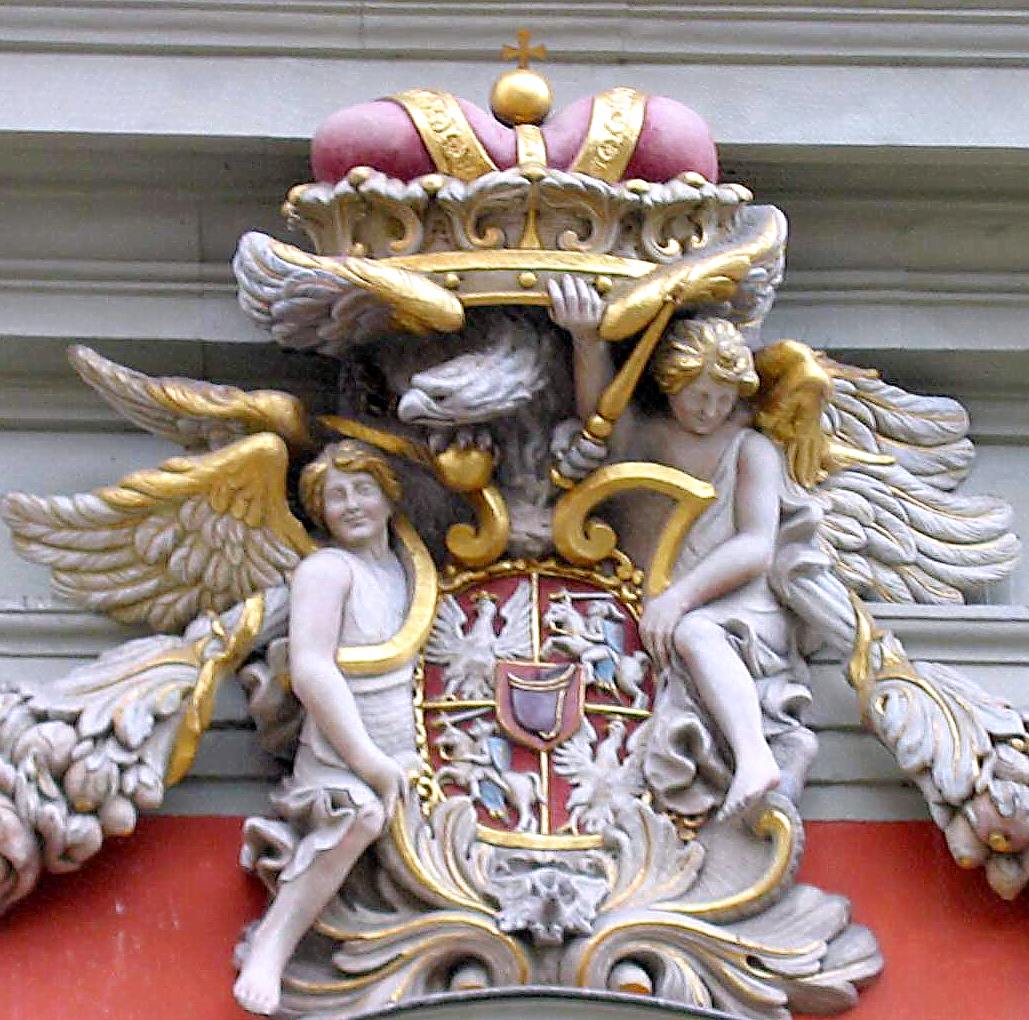
Portrayal of Sobieski's royal crown, Gdańsk.

== Notable members ==
Picture	Name	Born	Death	Parents	Consorts	Functions and Offices
	Stanisław Sobieski	c. 1450	1508/1516	Mikołaj Sobieski; Jadwiga	Małgorzata Krzyniecka	Szlachcic, owner of Sobieszyn
	Piotr Sobieski	c. 1460	after 1508	Mikołaj Sobieski; Jadwiga	Unknown by Name heiress of the village Bychawka	Szlachcic, owner of Lędo
	Sebastian Sobieski	c. 1486	1557	Stanisław Sobieski; Małgorzata Krzyniecka	Barbara Giełczewska	Szlachcic
	Jan Sobieski	c. 1518	1564	Sebastian Sobieski; Barbara Giełczewska	Katarzyna Gdeszyńska	Rotmistrz of Cavalry
	Marek Sobieski	c. 1550	1605	Jan Sobieski; Katarzyna Gdeszyńska	Jadwiga Snopkowska; Katarzyna Tęczyńska	Voivode of Lublin Voivodship
	Sebastian Sobieski	c. 1552	1614	Jan Sobieski; Katarzyna Gdeszyńska	Anna Zebrzydowska	Court Standard-Bearer of the Crown
	Jakub Sobieski	1590	1646	Marek Sobieski; Jadwiga Snopkowska	Marianna Wiśniowiecka; Zofia Teofila Daniłowiczówna	Magnate; Deputy of the Sejm
	Aleksandra Sobieska	c. 1590	1645	Marek Sobieski; Jadwiga Snopkowska	Krzysztof Wiesiołowski	Wife of Great Marshal of Lithuania
	Zofia Sobieska	c. 1586	unknown	Marek Sobieski; Jadwiga Snopkowska	Jan Mikołaj Wodyński	Wife of Voivode of Podlasie
	Katarzyna Sobieska	c. 1582	unknown	Marek Sobieski; Jadwiga Snopkowska	Stanisław Radziejowski	Wife of Voivode of Rawa and Łęczyca castellan of Rawa Mazowiecka
	Gryzelda Sobieska	c. 1588	1621	Marek Sobieski; Jadwiga Snopkowska	Dadżbóg Karnkowski; Jan Rozdrażewski	Voivode of Dorpat; Carver of Queen Constance of Austria
	Marek Sobieski	1628	1652	Jakub Sobieski; Zofia Teofila Daniłowiczówna	none	Starost of Jaworów and Krasnystaw; Rotmistrz of the Crown Army
	John III Sobieski	1629	1696	Jakub Sobieski; Zofia Teofila Daniłowiczówna	Marie Casimire Louise	King of Poland
	Katarzyna Sobieska	1634	1694	Jakub Sobieski; Zofia Teofila Daniłowiczówna	Władysław Dominik Zasławski-Ostrogski; Michał Kazimierz Radziwiłł	Wife of Deputy Chancellor of Lithuania and Field Hetman of Lithuania
	Jakub Ludwik Sobieski	1667	1737	Jan III Sobieski; Marie Casimire Louise	Jadwiga Elżbieta Amalia Sobieska	Pretender to the thrones of: Poland; Prussia; Moldavia; Hungary
	Teresa Kunegunda Sobieska	1676	1730	Jan III Sobieski; Marie Casimire Louise	Maximilian II Emanuel	Wife of Elector of Bavaria
	Aleksander Benedykt Sobieski	1677	1714	Jan III Sobieski; Marie Casimire Louise	none	Prince of Poland
	Konstanty Władysław Sobieski	1680	1726	Jan III Sobieski; Marie Casimire Louise	Maria Józefa Wessel	Prince of Poland
	Maria Karolina Sobieska	1697	1740	Jakub Ludwik Sobieski; Jadwiga Elżbieta Amalia Sobieska	Frédéric Maurice Casimir de La Tour d'Auvergne; Charles Godefroy de La Tour d'Auvergne	Princess of Turenne; Duchess of Bouillon; Last surviving member of the family
	Maria Klementyna Sobieska	1701	1735	Jakub Ludwik Sobieski; Jadwiga Elżbieta Amalia Sobieska	James Francis Edward Stuart	Wife of a pretender to the thrones of: Scotland; Ireland; England

== Palaces ==
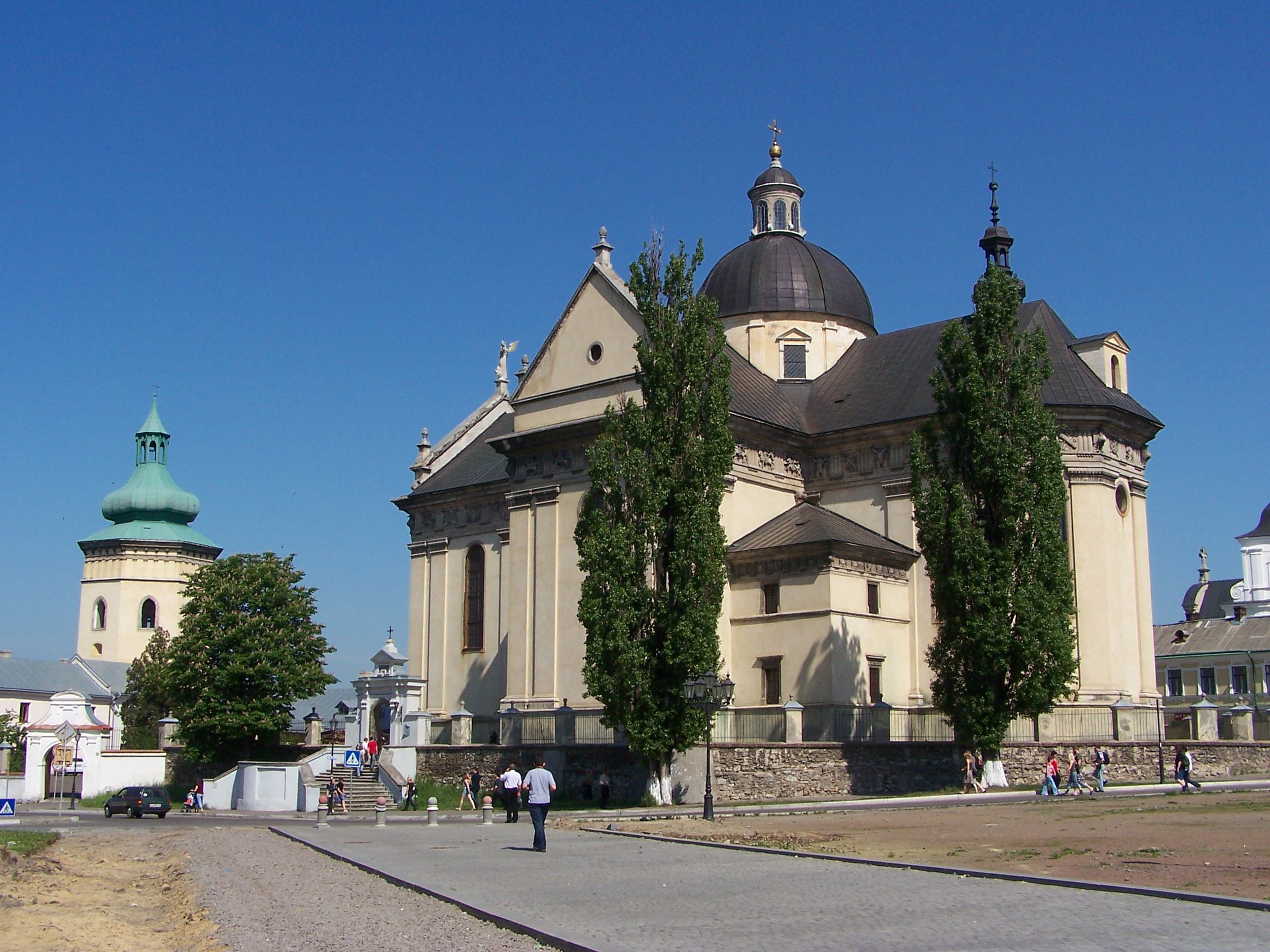
St. Lawrence's Church in Żółkiew. Mausoleum of the Żółkiewski and Sobieski family

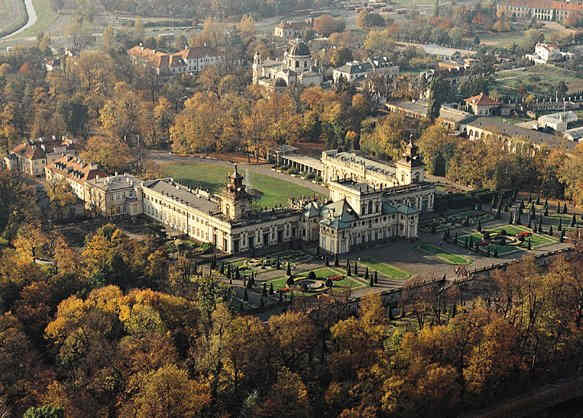
Wilanów Palace, Warsaw

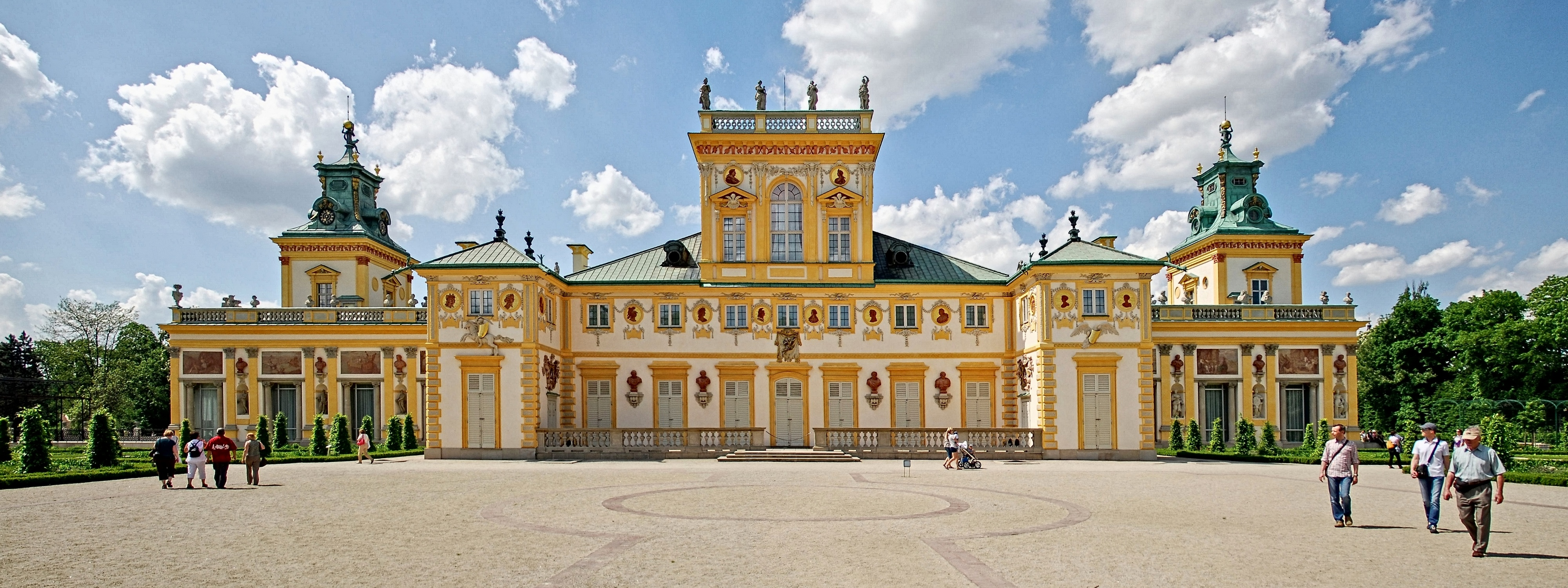
Wilanów Palace, Warsaw

== Famous descendants ==
Among the descendants of John III Sobieski were one Holy Roman Emperor (simultaneously one King of Bohemia and one King of Germany), seven Kings of Saxony (simultaneously one Duke of Warsaw), one King of Bavaria, two Kings of Italy (simultaneously one Emperor of Ethiopia and one King of the Albanians), one Tsar of Bulgaria, one Emperor of Austria (simultaneously one King of Hungary), one Queen consort of Spain and one titular Queen consort of England, Ireland and Scotland.

=== Tree ===
- John III Sobieski, married Marie Casimire Louise de La Grange d'Arquien
  - Theresa Kunegunda Sobieska, married Maximilian II Emanuel, Elector of Bavaria
    - Charles VII, Holy Roman Emperor
      - Duchess Maria Antonia of Bavaria
        - Frederick Augustus I of Saxony
        - Anthony of Saxony
        - Maximilian, Hereditary Prince of Saxony, married Princess Carolina of Parma (descendant of King Stanisław I Leszczyński)
          - Princess Maria Anna of Saxony (1799–1832)
            - Archduchess Auguste Ferdinande of Austria
              - Ludwig III of Bavaria
          - Frederick Augustus II of Saxony
          - John of Saxony
            - Princess Elisabeth of Saxony
              - Margherita of Savoy
                - Victor Emmanuel III of Italy
                  - Giovanna of Italy
                    - Simeon Saxe-Coburg-Gotha
            - Albert of Saxony
            - George, King of Saxony
              - Frederick Augustus III of Saxony
              - Princess Maria Josepha of Saxony (1867–1944)
                - Charles I of Austria
          - Maria Josepha Amalia, Queen of Spain
  - James Louis Sobieski
    - Maria Clementina Sobieska (titular Queen consort of England, Ireland and Scotland)
