= Antoine de L'Age, duc de Puylaurens =

French courtier

Antoine de l'Age (or Laage), duc de Puylaurens (1602 – 1 July 1635) was a French courtier.

He was born to an old Languedoc family. Attached to the household of Gaston, Duke of Orléans, brother of Louis XIII, he gained a complete ascendancy over the weak prince by pandering to his pleasures, and became his adviser in the intrigues against Cardinal Richelieu. It was Puylaurens who arranged the escape of Gaston to Brussels in 1632 after the capture of Henri II de Montmorency, and then negotiated his return with Richelieu, on condition that he should be reconciled to the king. As a reward Richelieu gave him Aiguillon, erected into a duchy. But he plunged into new intrigues, and was imprisoned first in the Louvre in 1635, then in Vincennes, where he died the same year.

The year previously he had married Marguerite-Philippe du Cambout, a grand-niece of Cardinal Richelieu.
