= Maria Karolina Sobieska =

Charlotte
- Duchess of Bouillon
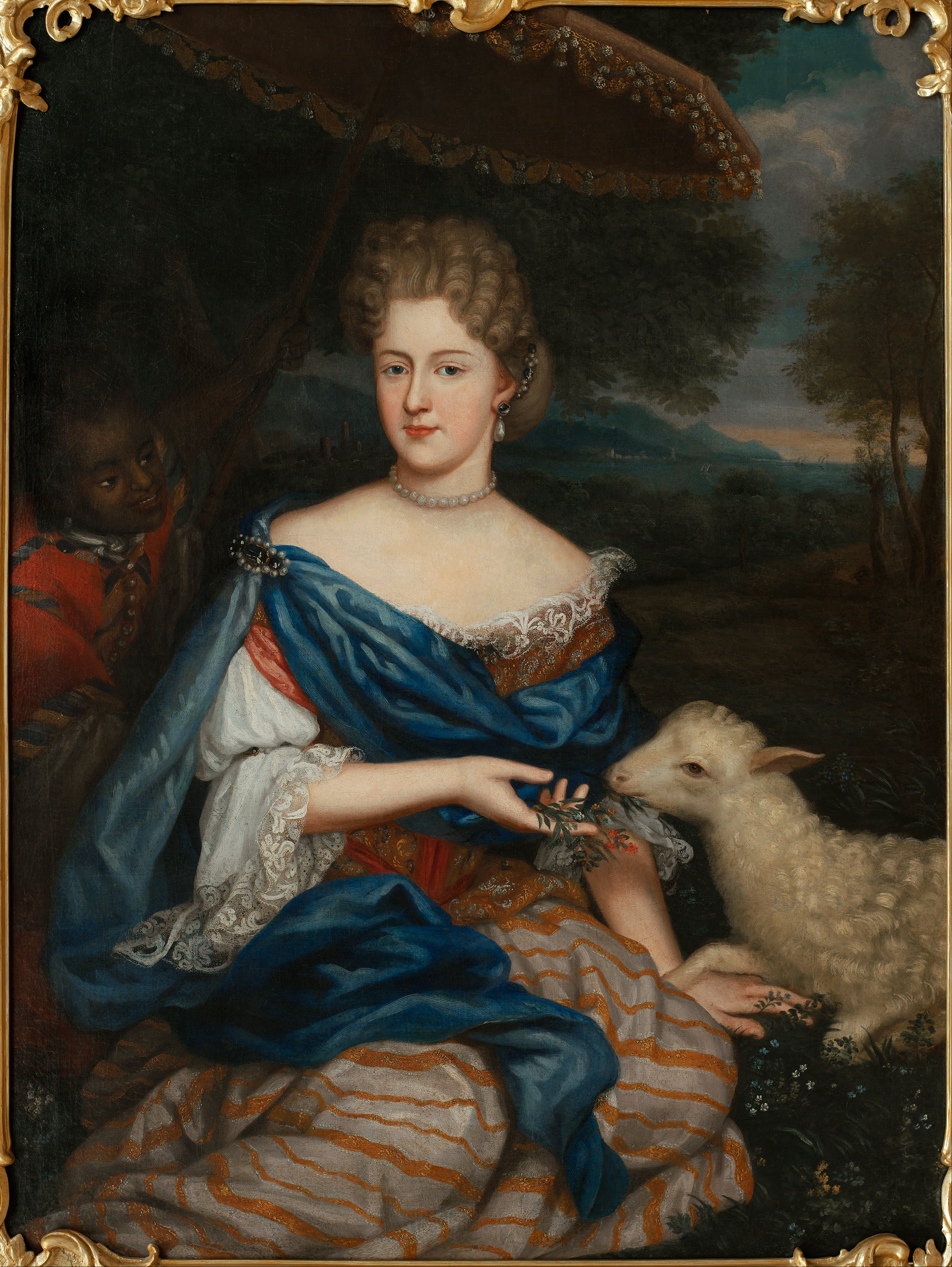
- Portrait of Charlotte Sobieska, Wilanów Palace
- Born: 25 November 1697; Ohlau, Silesia, Holy Roman Empire (modern Oława, Poland)
- Died: 8 May 1740 (aged 42); Żółkiew, Poland
- Burial: St. Kazimierz Church, Warsaw, Poland
- Spouse: Frédéric Casimir de La Tour d'Auvergne; Charles Godefroy de La Tour d'Auvergne
- Issue Detail: Marie Louise, Princess of Guéméné; Godefroy, Duke of Bouillon
Names
- Maria Karolina Sobieska
- House: Sobieski
- Father: James Louis Sobieski
- Mother: Hedwig Elisabeth of Neuburg

Maria Karolina Sobieska (25 November 1697 – 8 May 1740) was a Polish noblewoman, daughter of Jakub Ludwik Sobieski. Known as Marie Charlotte or only Charlotte, she was the Princess of Turenne and later Duchess of Bouillon by marriage. Charlotte was the last surviving member of the House of Sobieski.

== Biography ==
Born to James Louis Sobieski and his wife Countess Palatine Hedwig Elisabeth of Neuburg, she was the couple's third daughter. Her younger sister Clementina, married the Jacobite pretender James Francis Edward Stuart.

Her paternal cousins included (children of her aunt Theresa Kunegunda Sobieska) Charles VII, Holy Roman Emperor and Clemens August of Bavaria, Archbishop of Cologne. Her maternal cousins included the famous Elisabeth Farnese, the future John V of Portugal as well as his consort Maria Anna of Austria.

Her childhood was spent in Silesia. She was asked for her hand by many an aristocrat including Antonio Ferrante Gonzaga, Duke of Guastalla. She, however, rejected him due to the duke's mental illness.

Having travelled to Neuburg, her mother's birthplace, she embarked on an affair with Michał Kazimierz "Rybeńko" Radziwiłł, a future Great Hetman of the Grand Duchy of Lithuania. She had wanted to marry him but her father would not allow the couple to elope. A depressed Charlotte wanted to leave the court and join a convent but Charles VI, Holy Roman Emperor (another first cousin), took it upon himself to find her a suitable husband.

The candidate was found in form of Frédéric Casimir de La Tour d'Auvergne, son of Emmanuel Théodose de La Tour d'Auvergne and Marie Armande Victoire de La Trémouille. He was the heir to the sovereign Duchy of Bouillon which the La Tour d'Auvergne's had ruled for over a century. As heir, he was styled the prince de Turenne. Charlotte married Frédéric Casimir by proxy on 25 August 1723 at Neuss (modern day Germany). The couple met for the first time at Strassburg on 20 September and were married formally.

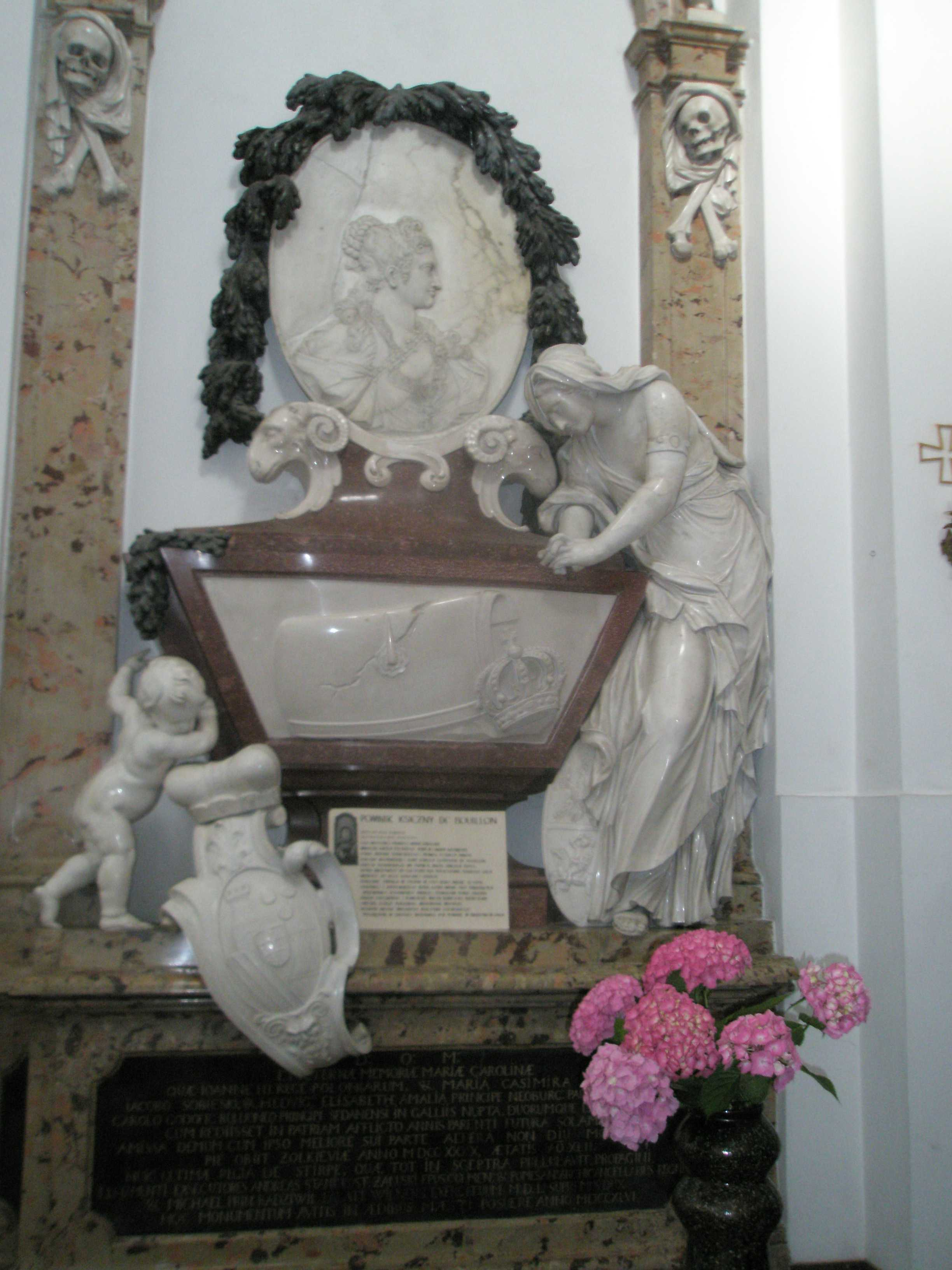
Tombstone of Charlotte in the St. Kazimierz Church in Warsaw, carved by Lorenzo Mattielli

At the French court, the House of La Tour d'Auvergne ranked as Foreign Princes. This entitled them to the style of Highness. As such, prior to becoming Duchess of Bouillon, Charlotte was styled as Her Highness the Princess of Turenne.

Frédéric Casimir died in Strassburg on 1 October 1723 leaving Charlotte a widow having been married for fourteen days. Seven months later, she married her dead husband's younger brother Charles Godefroy who was now prince de Turenne and heir to Bouillon. The new couple married on 2 April 1724 in Paris. The marriage produced two children; a daughter named Marie Louise (mistress of her first cousin Charles Edward Stuart, the Jacobite pretender) and a son named Godefroy who was the penultimate Duke of Bouillon.

The marriage was not happy. The couple divorced and Charlotte moved to Silesia. Moving again, this time to Żółkiew, she spent her last years trying to protect her father's estates of which she was the heiress to from 1737. At her father's death, she inherited the Duchy of Oława where she was born.

Before her death, she designated her old lover, Michał Kazimierz "Rybeńko" Radziwiłł, as her heir. A part of her library was transmitted into the famous Załuski Library which was succeeded by today's National Library of Poland.

She was buried at the Church of Saint Kazimierz in Warsaw, Poland. Charlotte's heart was embalmed and placed in the parish church of Żółkiew. Her tombstone was designed in 1747 by her former lover. It displays a crack indicating the extinction of the Sobieski family of which she was the last surviving member.

Her husband outlived her, dying in 1771. Her son lived until 1792 and her daughter was executed in The Terror of the French Revolution.

== Issue ==
Children with her second husband;

- Marie Louise Henriette Jeanne de La Tour d'Auvergne (15 August 1725–1793) married the Prince of Guéméné and had issue; was guillotined during the revolution; had a secret child with her cousin Charles Edward Stuart;
- Godefroy Charles Henri de La Tour d'Auvergne (26 January 1728–3 December 1792) married Louise Henriette Gabrielle de Lorraine and had issue, she was a grand daughter of Charles de Lorraine, Count of Marsan.

== Ancestry ==
Ancestors of Maria Karolina Sobieska

8. Jakub Sobieski
4. John III Sobieski
9. Zofia Teofila Daniłowicz
2. James Louis Sobieski
10. Henri Albert de La Grange d'Arquien
5. Marie Casimire Louise de La Grange d'Arquien
11. Françoise de La Châtre
1. Maria Carolina Sobieski
12. Wolfgang Wilhelm, Count Palatine of Neuburg
6. Philipp Wilhelm, Elector Palatine
13. Duchess Magdalene of Bavaria
3. Countess Palatine Hedwig Elisabeth of Neuburg
14. George II, Landgrave of Hesse-Darmstadt
7. Landgravine Elisabeth Amalie of Hesse-Darmstadt
15. Princess Sophia Eleonore of Saxony
