= Marguerite-Philippe du Cambout =

French noblewoman

- Countess of Harcourt and Armagnac
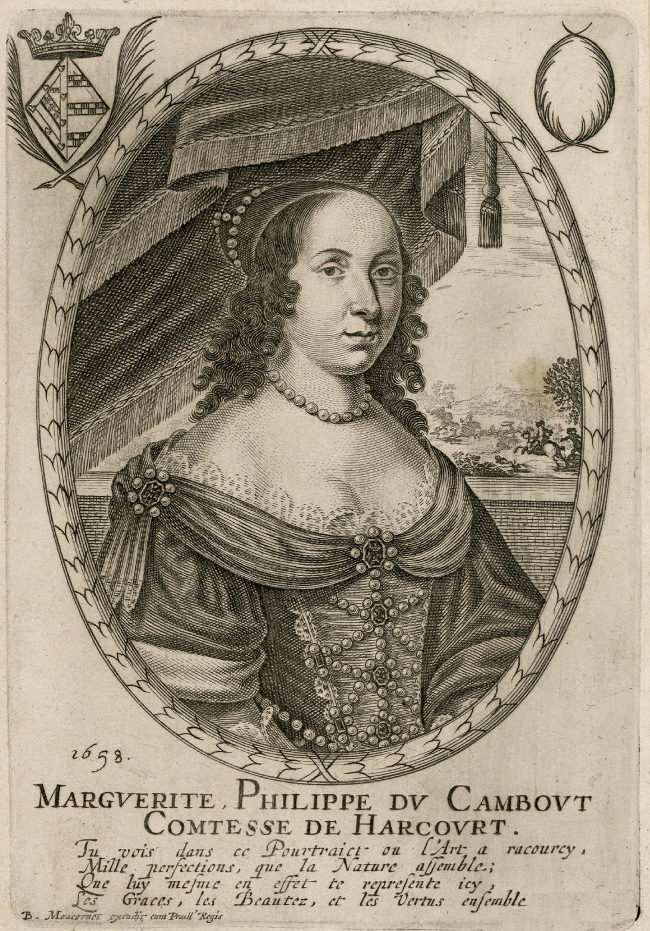
- Born: 1624
- Died: 9 December 1674 (aged 49–50); Paris
- Buried: Église des Capucines, Paris
- Noble family: Cambout (by birth); Lorraine (by marriage)
- Spouses: Antoine de l'Age, Duke of Puylaurens (m. 1634–35); Henri de Lorraine, Count of Harcourt (m. 1639–66)
- Issue: Armande Henriette, abbess Louis, Count of Armagnac; Philippe, Chevalier de Lorraine; Alfonse Louis, abbot Raimond Bérenger, abbot Charles, Count of Marsan
- Father: Charles du Cambout, Marquis of Coislin
- Mother: Philippe de Beurges, dame de Seury

Marguerite-Philippe du Cambout (1624 – 9 December 1674) was a French noblewoman.

== Life ==
Born in 1624, Marguerite was the daughter of Charles du Cambout, Marquis of Coislin and Philippe de Beurges, dame de Seury. Through her father she was the grand-niece of Cardinal Richelieu. In 1634 she married Antoine de l'Age (1605–35), Duke of Aiguilon, also called Duke of Pui-Laurent. Her first husband, Antoine de l'Age, was involved in political intrigues, and was imprisoned first in the Louvre in 1635, then in Vincennes, where he died the same year. In February 1639, Marguerite remarried to Henri de Lorraine.

Marguerite died of apoplexy in Paris on 9 December 1674 at the age of 50. She was buried in the Église des Capucines on the Rue Saint-Honoré, Paris.

== Children ==
Marguerite and Henri had five children:

1. Armande Henriette of Lorraine (1640–1684), abbess of Notre-Dame de Soissons
2. Louis, Count of Armagnac (1641–1718), called Monsieur le Grand, Grand Squire of France
3. Philippe of Lorraine (1643–1702), called Chevalier de Lorraine and long-term lover of Philippe of France, Duke of Orléans (the only brother of King Louis XIV)
4. Alfonse Louis of Lorraine (1644–1689), abbot of Royaumont, called the Chevalier d'Harcourt
5. Raimond Bérenger of Lorraine (1647–1686), abbot of Faron de Meaux, called the Abbé d'Harcourt
6. Charles of Lorraine (1648–1708), viscount then count of Marsan
