= Charles Louis, Count of Marsan =

Charles Louis
- Prince of Pons; Count of Marsan
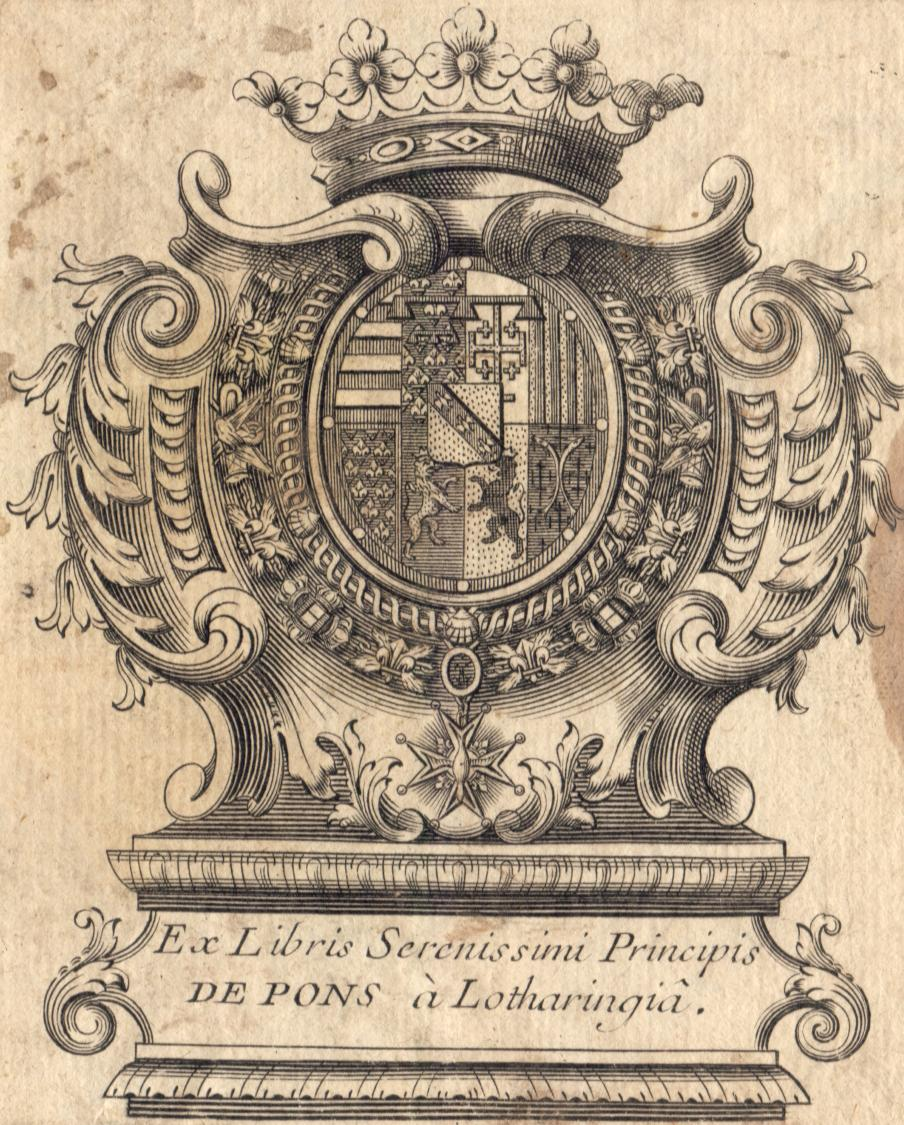
- Born: 21 October 1696; France
- Died: 2 November 1755 (aged 59); Paris, France
- Spouse: Élisabeth de Roquelaure
- Issue: Leopoldine Élisabeth, Mademoiselle de Pons; Louise, Duchess of Bouillon; Gaston, Count of Marsan; Camille, Prince of Pons
Names
- Charles Louis de Lorraine
- House: Guise
- Father: Charles, Count of Marsan
- Mother: Catherine Thérèse de Goyon de Matignon

Charles Louis de Lorraine (21 October 1696 – 2 November 1755) was a French nobleman and general, member of a cadet branch of the House of Guise. He held the titles of Count of Marsan, Lord of Pons and Prince of Mortagne-sur-Gironde, but he was known by the courtesy title of Prince of Pons.

== Biography ==
Born to Charles de Lorraine, Count of Marsan and his wife Catherine Thérèse de Goyon de Matignon, he was the couples eldest child. Styled the Prince of Pons from birth, he was also the Count of Marsan at his father's death in November 1708. As a member of the House of Lorraine-Guise, he was a Foreign Prince and as such, was addressed with the style of Highness. His mother was the first wife of Jean Baptiste Colbert, Marquis of Seignelay and as such, Charles Louis had four half siblings.

Through his mother, he was a first cousin of Jacques I, Prince of Monaco, the spouse of Louise Hippolyte, Princess of Monaco. He was also the Prince of Mortagne.

=== Marriage ===
He married Élisabeth de Roquelaure, a daughter of Antoine Gaston de Roquelaure. The couple were married on 1 March 1714. Élisabeth gave him four children, two sons and two daughters. His younger daughter Louise married into the Duke of Bouillons family and his eldest son Gaston married a princess of the House of Rohan. His youngest son married a daughter of the Duke of Nevers. Only his daughter Louise had further issue.

=== Military career ===
In 1717, the Prince of Pons was posted in Hungary.

On 3 June 1724, he was made a knight of the Order of the Holy Spirit, the most prestigious decoration of the Ancien régime.

He was promoted to the rank of Brigadier in 1734, then maréchal de camp (Major General) in 1738 and finally Lieutenant General in 1744. His first son was his aide-de-camp in the 1736 campaign; his second son was his aide-de-camp in the 1741-1742 campaign during the War of Austrian Succession.

=== Death ===
He outlived his wife by three years. He was buried at the Catacombs of Paris.

== Issue ==
- Leopoldine Élisabeth de Lorraine (2 October 1716 – ?) never married;
- Louise Henriette Gabrielle de Lorraine, Mademoiselle de Marsan, Duchess of Bouillon (30 December 1718 – 5 September 1788) married Godefroy de La Tour d'Auvergne and had issue;
- Gaston Jean Baptiste Charles de Lorraine, Count of Marsan (7 February 1721 – 2 May 1743) married Marie Louise de Rohan and had no issue; died of smallpox;
- Camille Louis de Lorraine, Prince of Marsan, Prince of Puyguilhem (18 December 1725 – 12 April 1780) married Hélène Julie Rosalie Mancini, Mademoiselle de Nevers, and had no issue.
