= Godefroy de La Tour d'Auvergne =

Godefroy
- Duke of Bouillon
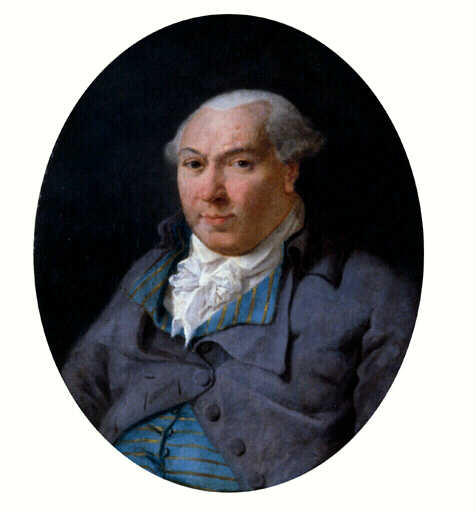
- Portrait du Duc de Bouillon, Jean-François Colson, 1775, musée de l'Ancien Évêché (Évreux)
- Born: 26 January 1728
- Died: 3 December 1792 (aged 64); Château de Navarre, Évreux, France
- Spouse: Louise Henriette Gabrielle de Lorraine
- Issue: Jacques-Léopold, Duke of Bouillon; Charles Louis Godefroi, Prince of Auvergne
Names
- Godefroy Charles Henri de La Tour d'Auvergne
- House: La Tour d'Auvergne
- Father: Charles Godefroy de La Tour d'Auvergne
- Mother: Maria Karolina Sobieska

Godefroy de La Tour d'Auvergne (Godefroy Charles Henri; 26 January 1728, Paris – 3 December 1792) was a member of the House of La Tour d'Auvergne, the Sovereign Dukes of Bouillon. He was subsequently the penultimate Duke of Bouillon succeeding his father in 1771.

== Biography ==
The younger of two children, he was born to the Duke and Duchess of Bouillon in 1728. He had an older sister, Marie Louise (1725–1793) who later married the Prince of Guéméné.

Styled the Prince of Turenne as the heir apparent to Bouillon, he married Princess Louise Henriette Gabrielle de Lorraine on 27 November 1743. She was a member of the house of Lorraine and a great grand daughter of Henri, Count of Harcourt. The couple had four children in all before Louise Henriette Gabrielle died in 1788; three children pre-deceased them. The widower Duke married again in 1789 to Marie Françoise Henriette de Banastre (1775–1816), a girl who was some forty-seven years younger than he. No children were produced from the marriage.

He served with distinction in the Seven Years' War. In 1748 he was made a maréchal de camp. In 1747, he succeeded his father as Grand chamberlain of France, a ceremonial position he would hold unitil 1775. He was elected to the Royal Academy of Painting and Sculpture in 1777. In just three months, he squandered almost a million livres on his mistress, an opera singer, thus bringing his family to the verge of ruin.

He died at the Château de Navarre on and was succeeded by his eldest son Jacques, who was an invalid. Jacques was the last Duke of Bouillon, the title being abolished during the French Revolution. The Princes of Guéméné today claim the Duchy of Bouillon as their own due to the marriage of Marie Louise (his only sibling) and Jules de Rohan, Prince of Guéméné. He has no known descendants.

== Gallery ==
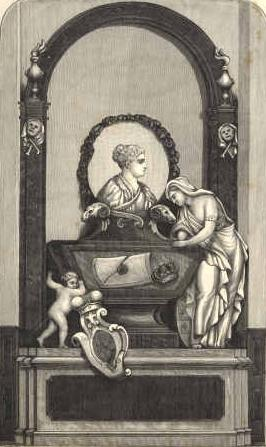
Tombstone of his mother, Charlotte at the Saint Kazimierz Church in Warsaw

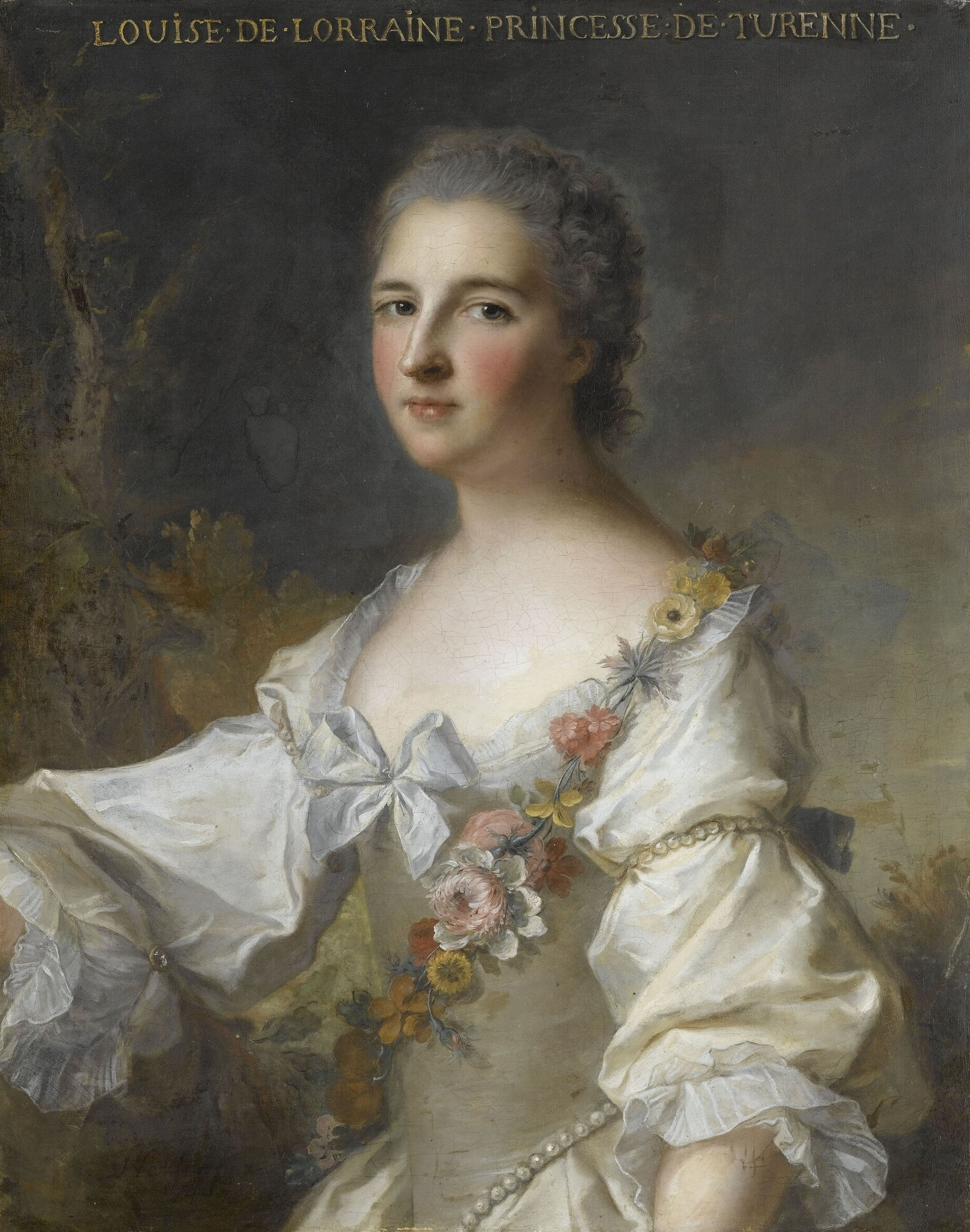
Louise de Lorraine, princesse de Turenne by Jean-Marc Nattier (1746)
Versailles, Musée national du Château et des Trianons

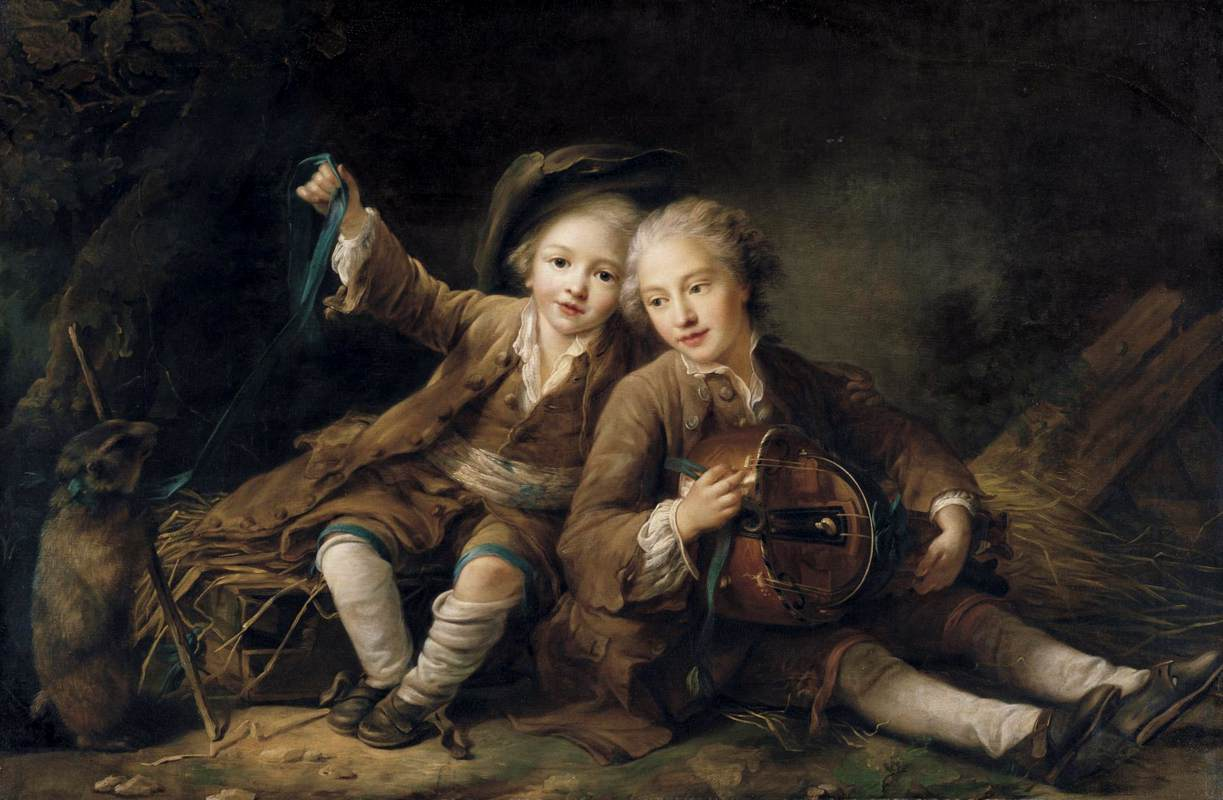
The Children of the Duke of Bouillon dressed as Montagnards by François-Hubert Drouais (1756)
Private collection

== Issue ==
- Jacques Leopold Charles Godefroy de La Tour d'Auvergne (15 January 1746 – 7 February 1802) married Hedwig of Hesse-Rotenburg, grand daughter of Ernest Leopold of Hesse-Rotenburg and Eleonore of Löwenstein-Wertheim-Rochefort; no issue;
- Charles Louis Godefroi de La Tour d'Auvergne, Prince of Auvergne (22 September 1749 – 23 October 1767) never married;
- Louis Henri de La Tour d'Auvergne, Duke of Albret (20 February 1753 – 7 March 1753) died in infancy;
- X de La Tour d'Auvergne (3 April 1756) stillborn daughter.

== Ancestry ==
Ancestors of Godefroy de La Tour d'Auvergne

8. Godefroy Maurice de La Tour d'Auvergne
4. Emmanuel Théodose de La Tour d'Auvergne
9. Marie Anne Mancini
2. Charles Godefroy de La Tour d'Auvergne
10. Charles Belgique Hollande de La Trémoille
5. Marie Armande Victoire de La Trémouille
11. Madeleine de Créquy
1. Godefroy de La Tour d'Auvergne
12. John III Sobieski
6. Jakub Ludwik Sobieski
13. Marie Casimire Louise de La Grange d'Arquien
3. Maria Karolina Sobieska
14. Philipp Wilhelm, Elector Palatine
7. Countess Palatine Hedwig Elisabeth Amelia of Neuburg
15. Landgravine Elisabeth Amalie of Hesse-Darmstadt
