= Henri, Count of Harcourt =

French nobleman

Henri de Lorraine
- Count of Harcourt
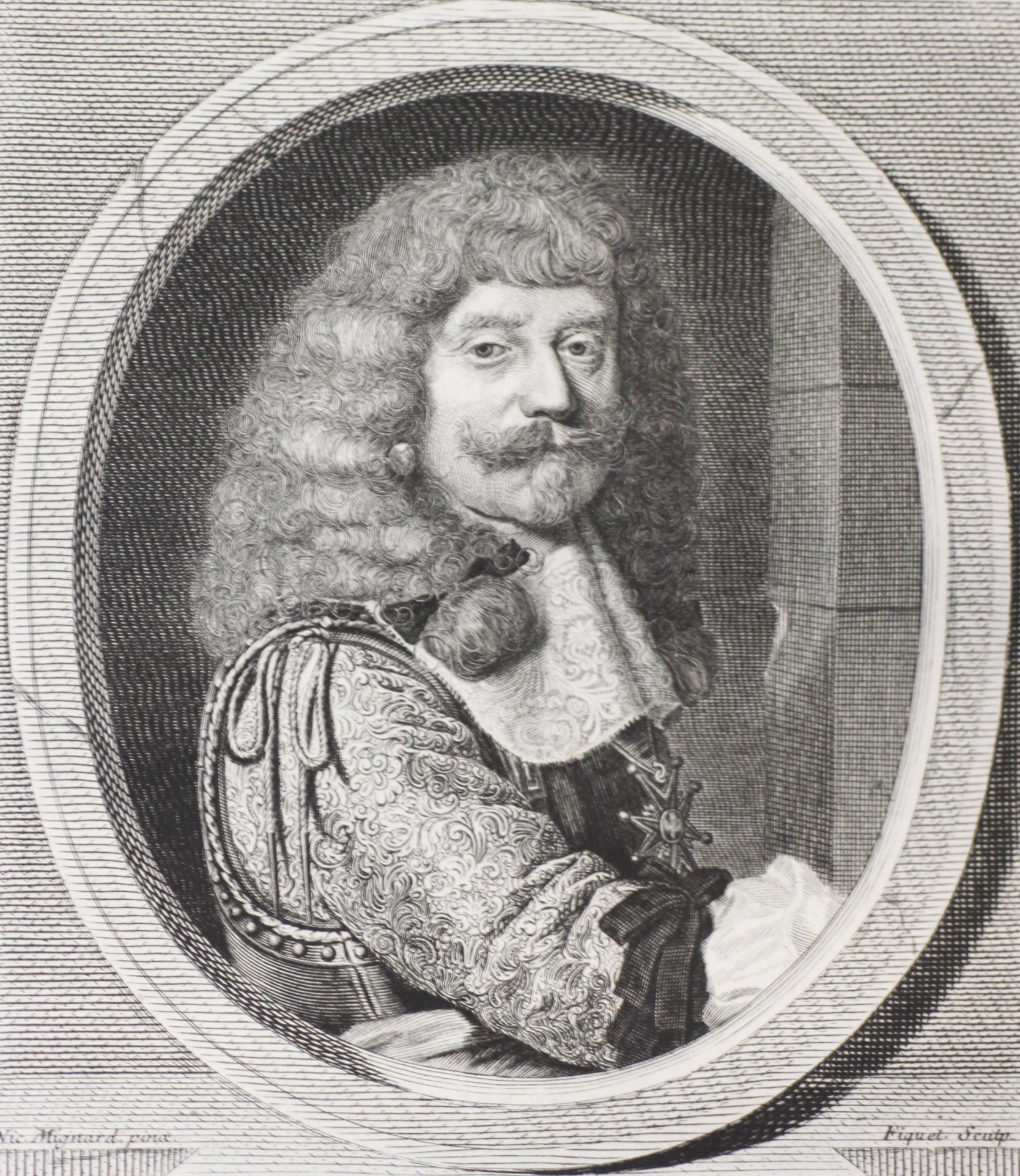
- Born: 20 March 1601
- Died: 25 July 1666 (aged 65); Royaumont Abbey in Asnières-sur-Oise
- Buried: Église Saint-Roch, Paris
- Noble family: Lorraine
- Spouse: Marguerite-Philippe du Cambout (m. 1639–1666)
- Issue: Armande Henriette, abbess Louis, Count of Armagnac; Philippe, Chevalier de Lorraine; Alfonse Louis, abbot Raimond Bérenger, abbot Charles, Count of Marsan
- Father: Charles I, Duke of Elbeuf
- Mother: Marguerite de Chabot, countess of Charny

Henri de Lorraine (20 March 1601 – 25 July 1666, Royaumont Abbey), known as Cadet la Perle, (Note: "Henri de Lorraine, comte de'Harcourt et d'Armagnac, was known as "cadet la perle" because he was a cadet of the house of Lorraine and wore a pearl in his ear.") was a French nobleman. He was count of Harcourt, count of Armagnac, count of Brionne and viscount of Marsan. Henri served in the royal army against the Huguenot revolt. He fought and defeated a Spanish army at Chieri, relieved the fortress of Casale, and took the city of Turin. He rescued the royal family during the first Fronde and failed in an attempt to create an independent principality for himself during the second Fronde. He died on 25 July 1666.

== Life ==
Henri was the younger son of Charles I, Duke of Elbeuf and his wife Marguerite de Chabot, countess of Charny. He first saw active duty at the siege of Prague in November 1620. In the 1630s, he served in the royal military during the fighting against the Huguenot revolt. In 1637, Henri commanded an army during the Franco-Spanish War (1635–1659), where he defeated a numerically superior Spanish army, near Chieri, which allowed him to relieve the besieged fortress of Casale. Henry led the Siege of Turin (1640), taking the city after a siege of three months. Henri then fought in Sardinia and Catalonia, where he was named viceroy in 1645. He was later defeated in Catalonia in 1646.

During the first Fronde, Henri moved the royal family to safety. During the second Fronde, seizing on the troubles facing Mazarin, he sought to establish an independent principality for himself along the Rhine. It was rapidly crushed. After his falling out with Mazarin, he withdrew to his estate at Royaumont, where he died in 1666, burdened by considerable debts.

== Marriage and issue ==
In February 1639, Harcourt married Marguerite-Philippe du Cambout (1622–74). They had six children:

1. Armande Henriette of Lorraine (1640–1684), Abbess of Notre-Dame de Soissons
2. Louis, Count of Armagnac (1641–1718), called Monsieur le Grand, Grand Squire of France
3. Philippe of Lorraine (1643–1702), called the Chevalier de Lorraine and long-term lover of Philippe of France, Duke of Orléans (the only brother of King Louis XIV)
4. Alfonse Louis of Lorraine (1644–1689), Abbot of Royaumont, called the Chevalier d'Harcourt
5. Raimond Bérenger of Lorraine (1647–1686), Abbot of Faron de Meaux, called the Abbé d'Harcourt
6. Charles of Lorraine (1648–1708), Viscount then Count of Marsan

== Sources ==
- Kettering, Sharon (1978). Judicial Politics and Urban Revolt in Seventeenth-Century France. Princeton University Press. ISBN 978-0691052670.
- Osborne, Toby (2002). Dynasty and Diplomacy in the Court of Savoy: Political Culture and the Thirty Years' War. Cambridge University Press. ISBN 978-0521652681.
- Pieragnoli, Joan (2025). Le chevalier de Lorraine (in French). Paris: Presses Universitaires de France. ISBN 978-2-13-088138-4.
- Sonnino, Paul, ed. (2020). The Political Testament of Cardinal Richelieu. Rowman & Littlefield Publishing Group, Inc. ISBN 9781538135952.
- Spangler, Jonathan (2009). The Society of Princes: The Lorraine-Guise and the Conservation of Power and Wealth in Seventeenth-Century France. Routledge. ISBN 9781315237015.
- Taussig, Sylvie (2003). Pierre Gassendi (1592-1655): introduction à la vie savante. Brepols. ISBN 9782503521824.

French nobility
Preceded by Charles I	Count of Harcourt; 1605–1666	Succeeded by François Louis
