= Antoine Gaston de Roquelaure =

French nobleman and Marshal of France

Antoine Gaston
- 2nd Duke of Roquelaure
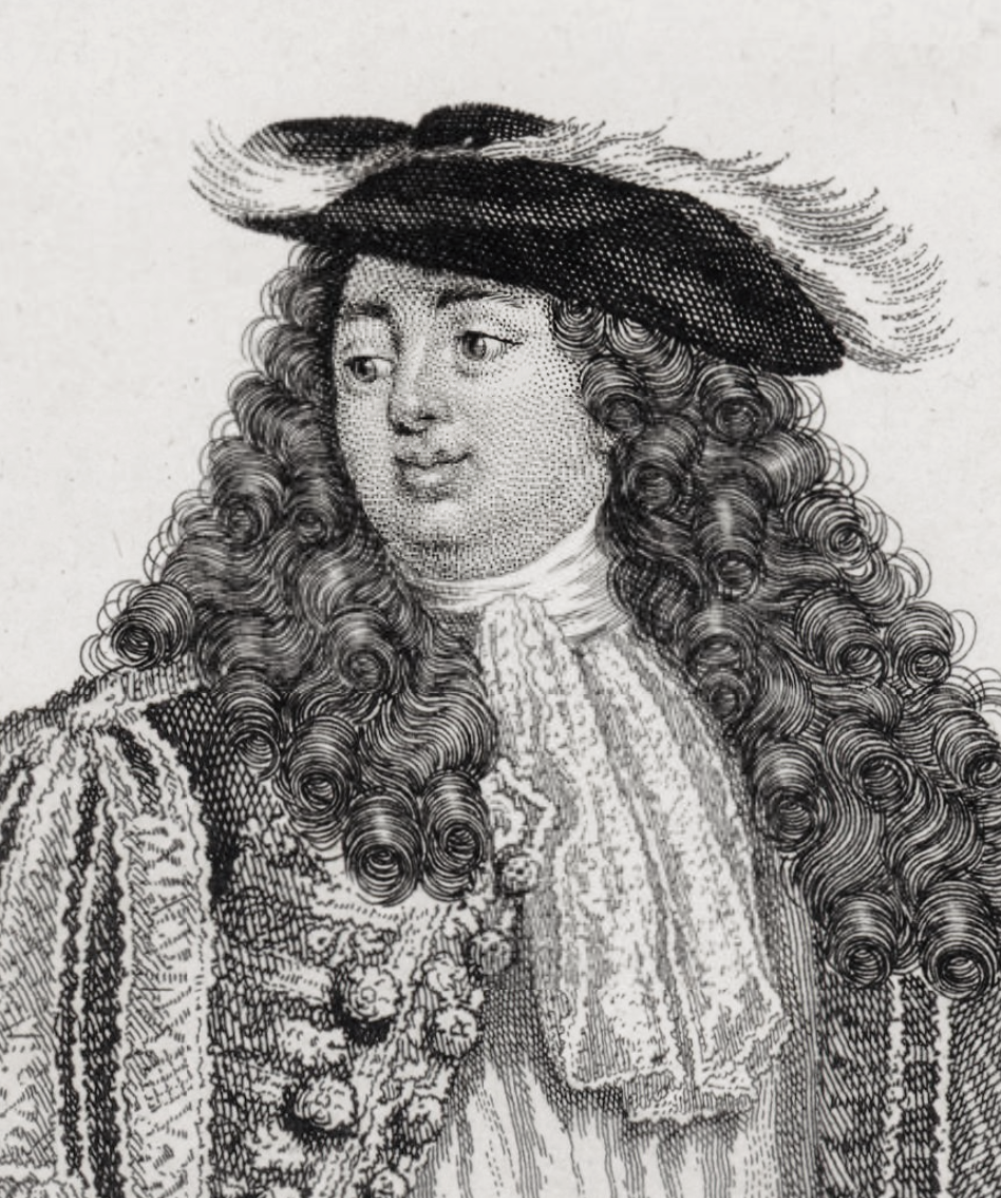
- Born: 1656
- Died: 6 May 1738 (aged 81–82)
- Spouse: Marie-Louise de Laval-Montmorency-Lezay (m. 1683; died 1735)
- Issue: Françoise de Roquelaure; Élisabeth de Roquelaure
Names
- Antoine Gaston de Roquelaure
- House: Roquelaure
- Father: Gaston Jean Baptiste de Roquelaure
- Mother: Charlotte Marie de Daillon du Lude

Antoine Gaston de Roquelaure, 2nd Duke of Roquelaure (French pronunciation: [ɑ̃twan ɡastɔ̃ də ʁɔklɔʁ]; 1656 – 6 May 1738) was a French nobleman and Marshal of France.

== Early life ==
Roquelaure was born in 1656 into a noble family originally from Armagnac. He was the son of Gaston Jean Baptiste de Roquelaure (1615–1683), 1st Duke of Roquelaure, and Charlotte Marie de Daillon du Lude (d. 1657), who was the sister and heiress of Henry de Daillon, Duke of Lude. His paternal grandfather was Marshal Antoine de Roquelaure, a close collaborator of Henry IV.

== Career ==
At a young age served in the Franco-Dutch War and later in the Nine Years' War. He was made Brigadier in 1689, Maréchal de camp in 1691, and Lieutenant-General in 1696. He was governor of Languedoc and suppressed the War of the Camisards. He was elevated to the dignity of Marshal of France on 2 February 1724 and was made a Knight of the Order of the Holy Spirit on 2 February 1728.

According to Saint-Simon, he was "pleasant company." The Marquis of Roquelaure, then the last Duke of Roquelaure in 1683 upon the death of his father, he was also Marquis of Lavardens and Biran, Count of Astarac, of Montfort, of Pontgibaud and of Gaure, Baron of Capendu, of Montesquiou, of Saint-Barthélemy of Cancon, of Casseneuil, of Champchevrier, of Monteil-Gelat, Pradmer and Buzaudon, Lord of Puyguilhem.

== Personal life ==
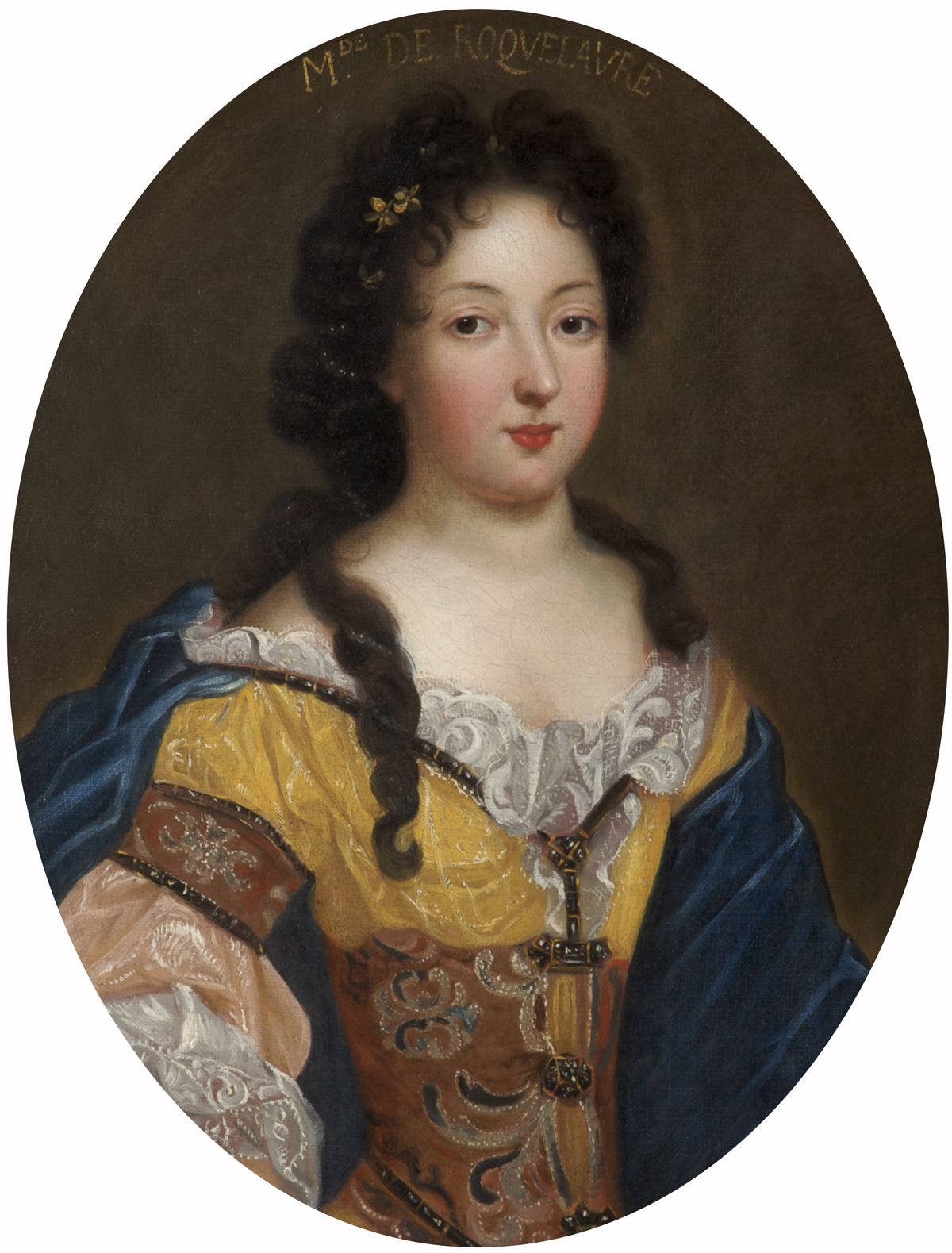
The Duchess of Roquelaure, by Pierre Mignard.

On 20 May 1683, he married Marie-Louise de Laval-Montmorency-Lezay (1657–1735), daughter of Guy-Urbain de Laval-Montmorency. She had been a maid of honor to the Dauphine. Together, they were the parents of two daughters:

- Françoise de Roquelaure (1683–1740), who married Louis Bretagne de Rohan-Chabot, Prince of Léon, then 4th Duke of Rohan (1679-1738), eldest son of Louis de Rohan-Chabot, in 1708.
- Élisabeth de Roquelaure (1696–1752), who married Charles Louis of Lorraine, "Count of Marsan" (1696-1755), Prince of Mortagne and Lord of Pons, in 1714.

Roquelaure had the Hôtel de Roquelaure built in 1724, the entrance to which is now located at 246 Boulevard Saint-Germain, in place of a "small house" that he had owned on this site since 1709. The second duke of Roquelaure also gave his name to the "roquelaure" or "roquelaire", a knee-length cloak.

He died on 6 May 1738. As he had no male issue, the duchy of Roquelaure passed to the Rohan family, who sold it, eventually coming into the possession of the King. The King then sold it to Guillaume Dubarry in 1772.

=== Descendants ===
Through his eldest daughter, he was a grandfather of Louis Marie, Duke of Rohan, who married Olympe de Châtillon, only daughter of the Duke of Châtillon.

== Bibliography ==
French nobility
Preceded by Gaston Jean Baptiste de Roquelaure	Duke of Roquelaure; 1683–1738	Extinct
