= James Louis Sobieski =

- Prince of Oława
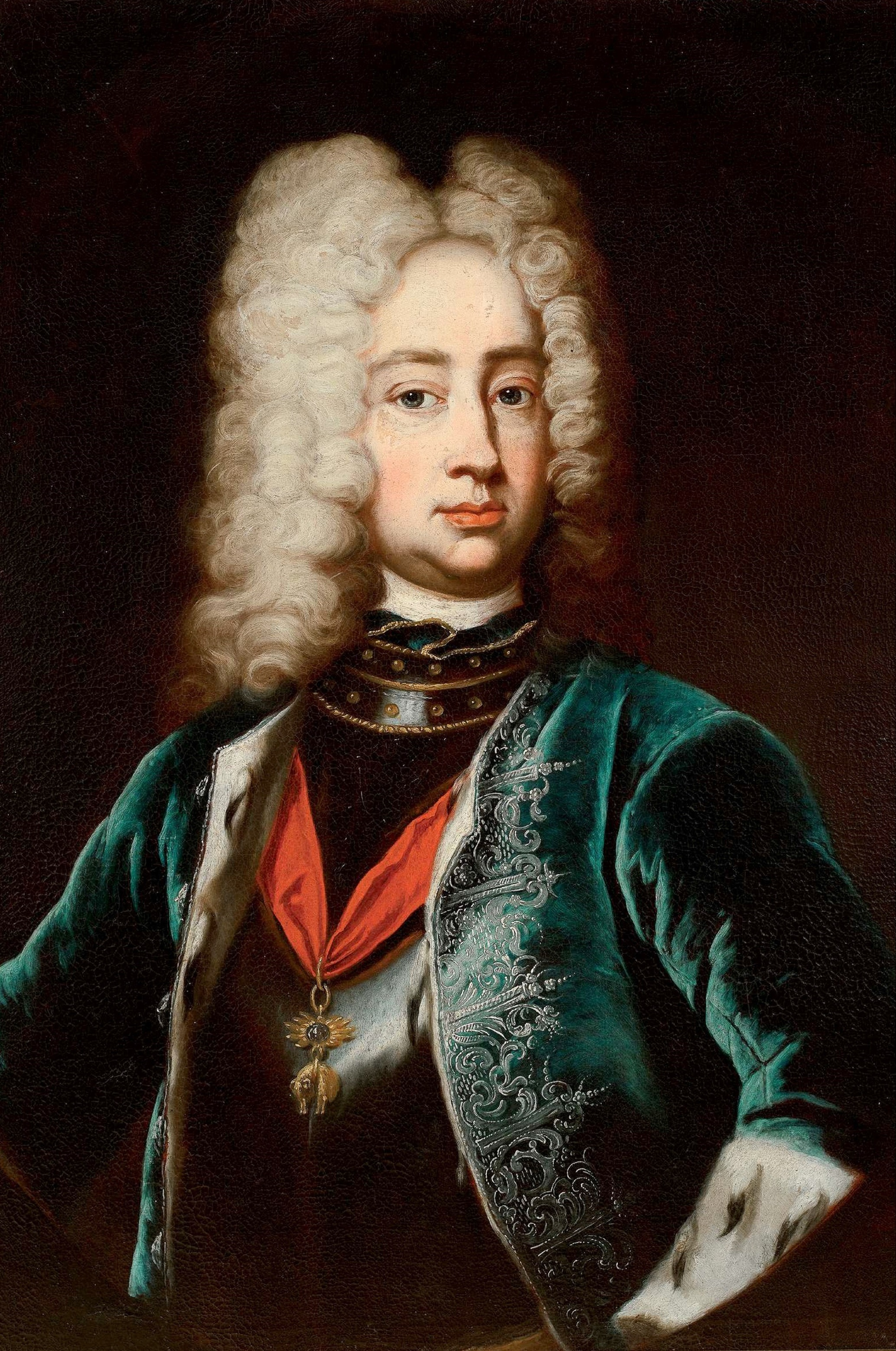
- Born: 2 November 1667; Paris, France
- Died: 19 December 1737 (aged 70); Żółkiew Castle, Żółkiew, Poland
- Spouse: Hedwig Elisabeth of Neuburg
- Issue Detail: Maria Carolina, Duchess of Bouillon; Maria Clementina, Jacobite consort
Names
- Jakub Ludwik Henryk Sobieski
- House: Sobieski
- Father: John III Sobieski
- Mother: Marie Casimire Louise de La Grange d'Arquien

James Louis Henry Sobieski (Polish: Jakub Ludwik Henryk Sobieski; French: Jacques Louis Henri de Sobieski; 2 November 1667 – 19 December 1737) was the son of John III Sobieski, king of Poland and grand duke of Lithuania, and Marie Casimire d'Arquien.

He was prepared by his parents to succeed John III on the Polish throne. Due to the Polish nobility's reluctance to accept hereditary succession, his efforts to claim the Polish crown after his father's death and during the Second Northern War came to nothing. Through his marriage to Hedwig Elisabeth of Neuburg, the daughter of the Count Palatine of Neuburg, he became connected to the ruling families of Europe. He was proposed as a candidate for several European principalities but ultimately received the Duchy of Oława from the Emperor. Toward the end of his life, he returned to the family estate in Żółkiew in the Kingdom of Poland, where he died in 1737.

== Biography ==
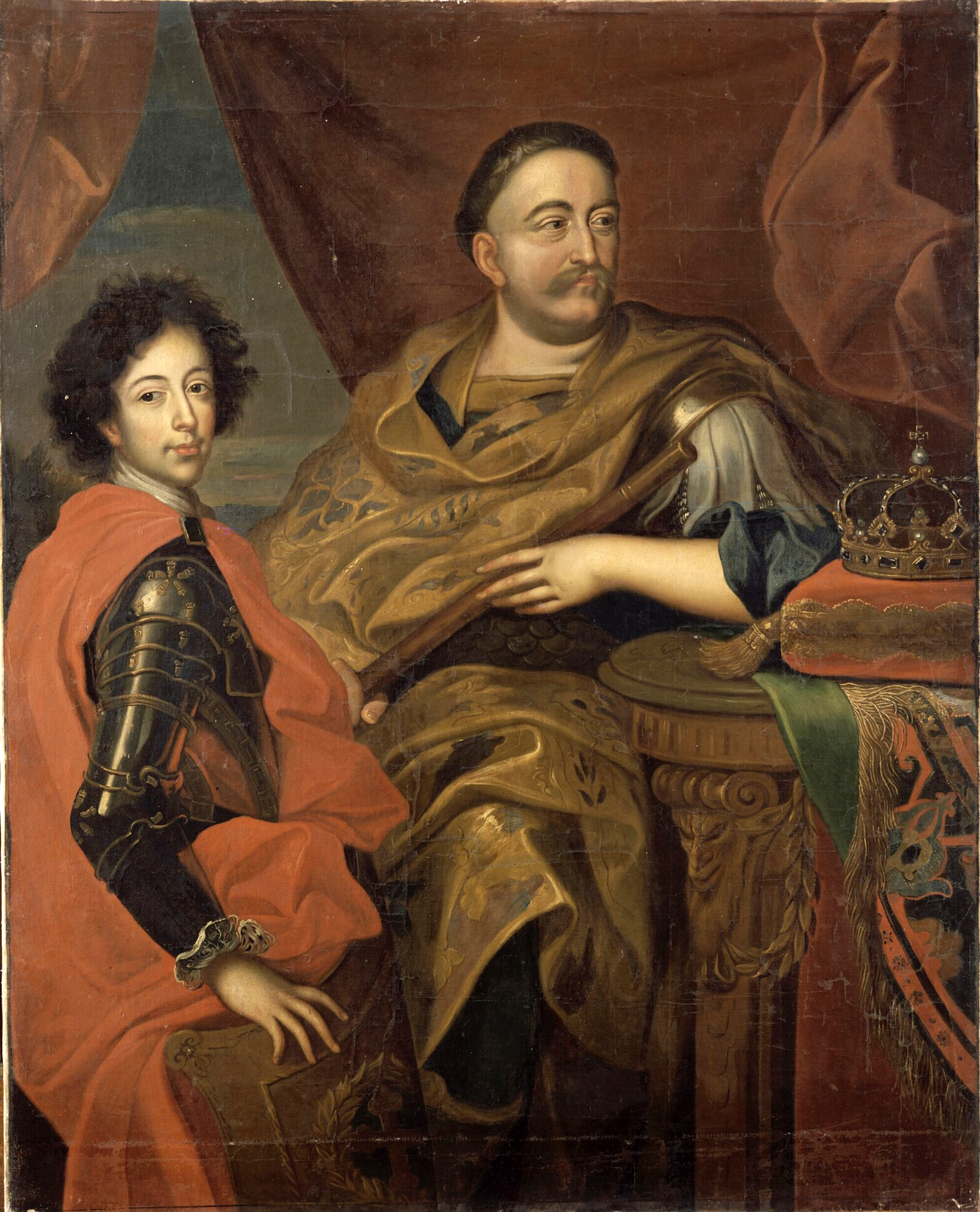
Portrait of Jakub Ludwik Sobieski with his father, c. 1680s by Jan Tricius

Jakub Ludwik Henry Sobieski was born on 2 November 1667 in Paris, France. He was given the first name Jakub in honor of his grandfather Jakub Sobieski, while his middle names "Louis" Henry were a gesture to his godparents, Louis XIV and Henrietta Maria of France.

Health problems were a constant for Jakub in his youth, and there is a wealth of correspondence exchanged between his parents on the subject. He likely had a spinal deformation, which was likely not very severe because Jakub was known as a good dancer and a proficient equestrian. His mother Maria Kazimiera repeatedly expressed her worry over her son's precarious health in her letters which survived to the present day. Father Kostrzycki became Jakub's guardian and educator in 1671.

=== Prince of Poland and Lithuania ===
With his father's election as King of Poland and Grand Duke of Lithuania in 1674, the education of Prince Jakub Sobieski became a state matter. As the son of the new monarch, he had every right to receive a proper education. Nonetheless, a fair number of deputies protested and were unwilling to grant royal rights to the Sobieski family. It is worth noting that relatively strong opposition to the king and his family arose within the szlachta's ranks during the peak of the king's popularity, immediately following his victory in the Battle of Khotyn. The general disdain that the nobility projected towards Jakub and his father Jan would be a constant impediment in the careers of both men in the decades to come.

=== Dynastic plans in Silesia and Ducal Prussia ===
The young prince was also drawn into his parents' dynastic plans, which only further inflamed the aristocracy's antipathy towards the Sobieski family. Despite efforts by his parents at the Vienna court, they were unable to secure for Jakub rule over the Duchies of Legnica, Brzeg, Wołów, and Oława in Silesia after the Piast dynasty died out in 1675. This led Jakub' father Jan III Sobieski to put a plan together to seize power in Ducal Prussia and elevate his son. The secret treaty of Jaworów signed in 1675 between the Polish king-Lithuanian grand duke and France committed Poland to aid France against Brandenburg-Prussia in exchange for French monetary subsidies and support for Polish claims over Ducal Prussia. The French promised to mediate between Poland and the Ottoman Empire so that Polish forces could be diverted from the southern border.

The treaty failed however, as French diplomats were unable to improve the relations between Polish-Lithuanian Commonwealth and the Ottomans. The Truce of Żurawno signed the following year was unfavorable to Poland-Lithuania. France eventually concluded the Treaty of Nijmegen with Prussia in 1679. This cooled France's relations with Poland, as Sobieski abandoned his pro-French stance. The Polish-French alliance had completely fallen apart by 1683 when some of the pro-French faction members within Poland were accused of plotting to overthrow Sobieski, and French ambassador Nicolas-Louis de l'Hospital, Bishop of Beauvais and Marquis of Vitry were forced to leave the country.

The failure of this plan prompted the king to promote Prince Jakub through participation in the war against the Ottoman Empire. In this way, King Jan was aiming to gain social acceptance for an increased role for the prince, who he hoped would become the second most important person in the Commonwealth after himself. These efforts culminated in the fifteen-year-old prince fighting alongside his father against the Turks at the Battle of Vienna in 1683. In line with his parents' ambitions for him, Prince Jakub was a member of the Order of the Golden Fleece a Catholic order of chivalry which has been referred to as the most elite brotherhood in the Christian faith.

=== Attempt to seize the Moldavian throne ===
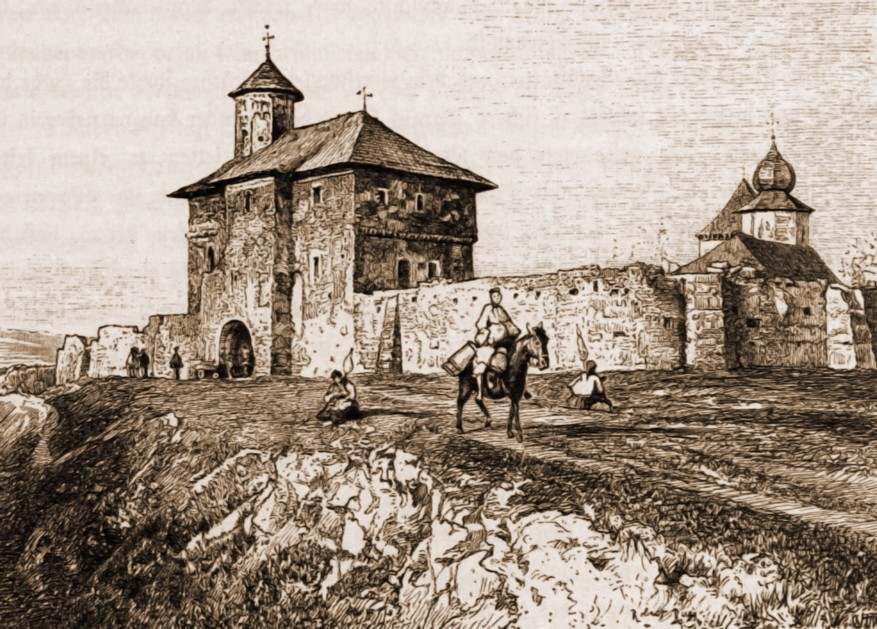
The Armenian monastery of Suceava was a base of operations in John III Sobieski's failed efforts to secure the Moldavian throne for his son Jakub.

Between 1685 and 1693 the Principality of Moldavia was ruled by Hospodar Constantin Cantemir. The first of the Cantemir dynasty on the Moldavian throne, Constantin was an illiterate from petty nobility who once served as an officer in the Polish Army whereas his predecessors had mostly been members of the powerful boyar families. Constantin's reign was characterized by clashes between two powerful factions of boyars, a pro-Polish-Lithuanian and a pro-Ottoman camp. While Kantemir himself officially sided with the pro-Ottomans, he nonetheless informally cooperated to some extent with the Polish–Lithuanian Commonwealth. Sensing weakness, Polish King and Lithuanian Grand Duke John III Sobieski had the Commonwealth's troops enter Moldavia twice in 1686 and 1691 to try to put his son Jakub on the Moldavian throne, utilizing the Armenian monastery of Suceava as a base of operations. These efforts were unsuccessful, and Kantemir ordered the execution of the leader of the pro-Polish party.

=== Duke of Oława ===
He was initially engaged to Ludwika Karolina Radziwiłł but the marriage never materialized. On 25 March 1691 Jakub Ludwik married Hedwig Elisabeth Amelia of Neuburg (1673–1722), the daughter of the Elector Palatine Philip William. In celebration of their wedding the opera Per goder in amor ci vuol costanza was created by librettist Giovanni Battista Lampugnani and composer Viviano Augustini. The couple had five daughters, two of whom would have progeny. As part of his wife's dowry, he received the Principality of Oława.

=== Candidacy for the Polish-Lithuanian Crown ===
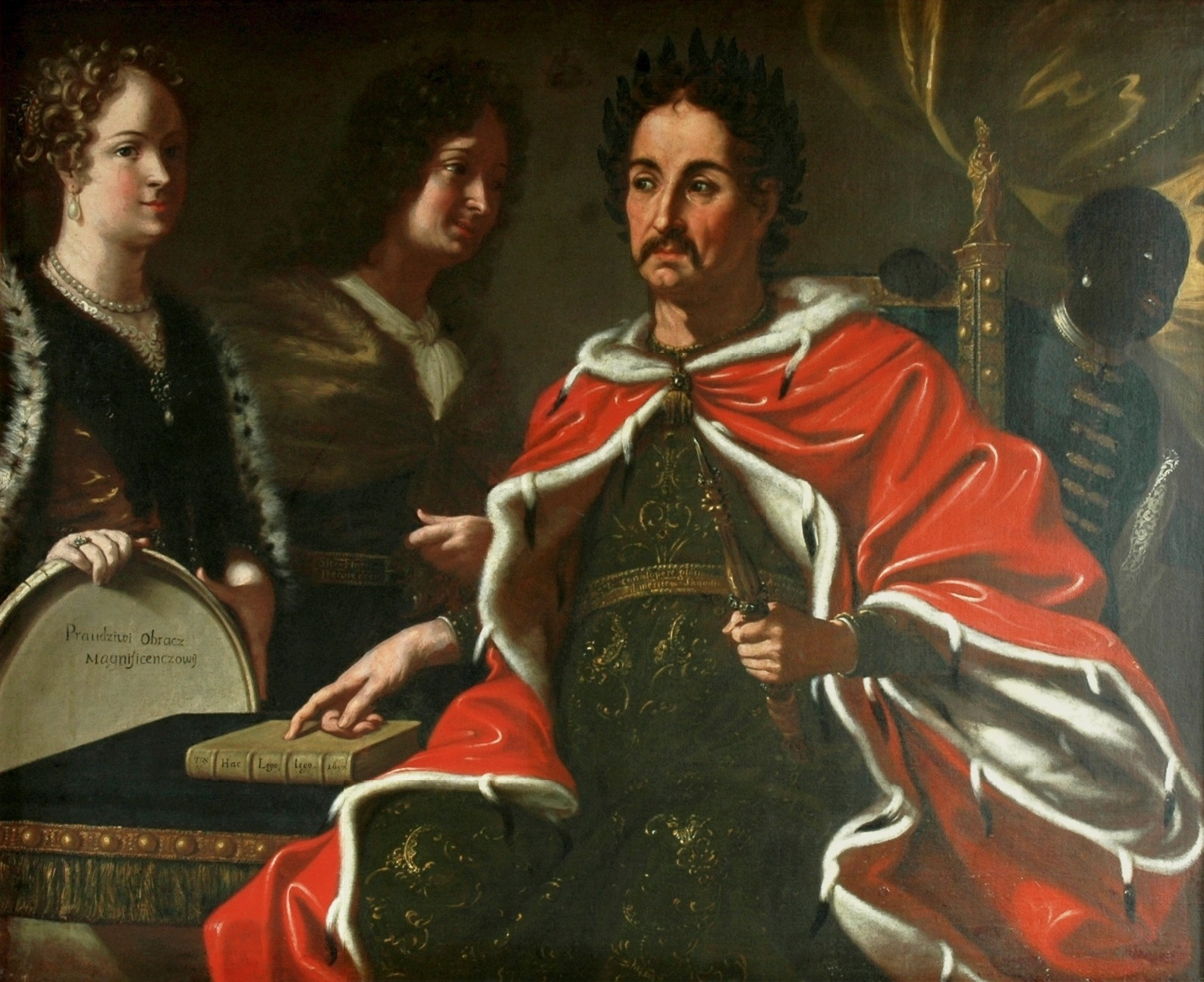
This painting was commissioned by Jakub Sobieski in 1697. It depicts his deceased father pointing to a book entitled Hac Lege lego and accompanied by Jakub and his wife, suggesting that Jakub ought to be the next King of Poland and Grand Duke of Lithuania.

With the death of Jakub Louis' father in 1696, no fewer than eighteen candidates stood for the vacant Polish-Lithuanian throne. Family rivalries prevented the election of Jakub Ludwik Sobieski even though Austria supported his candidacy. Jakub Ludwik Sobieski's own mother, Marie Casimire, favored her son-in-law, Maximilian II Emanuel, Elector of Bavaria. The powerful King Louis XIV of France supported François Louis, Prince of Conti (1664–1709).

In the end, Frederick Augustus, Elector of Saxony, who renounced Lutheranism and converted to Catholicism in order to qualify, was crowned as Augustus II, King of Poland and Grand Duke of Lithuania on 1 September 1697. It was the first time that a deceased monarch's son had not been elected to succeed him, the previous king's heir had been debarred from the throne by military force, and a German became king (which went against a tradition of avoiding German hegemony). Augustus II's first act as king was to expel the prince of Conti from the country.

=== Exile in Oława and imprisonment ===
After the coronation of King Augustus II, Sobieski began negotiations to reconcile with the new Polish king and Lithuanian grand duke. During the talks, Jakub was accused of trying to organize a rebellion against the new monarch and, as a result, lost substantial land holdings. Offended, Sobieski refused to pay homage to Augustus and left the Polish–Lithuanian Commonwealth for Oława in Silesia.

In 1704, Jakub Ludwik Sobieski and his brother Alexander were seized by Augustus II's troops in the vicinity of Wrocław and imprisoned over fears by Augustus that Sobieski might try to gain the Polish-Lithuanian throne. The brothers remained in prison in Pleissenburg and Königstein for two years before finally being released after the Treaty of Altranstädt where he signed a formal agreement to never again make any attempt to become King of Poland and Grand Duke of Lithuania.

=== Return to Poland-Lithuania ===
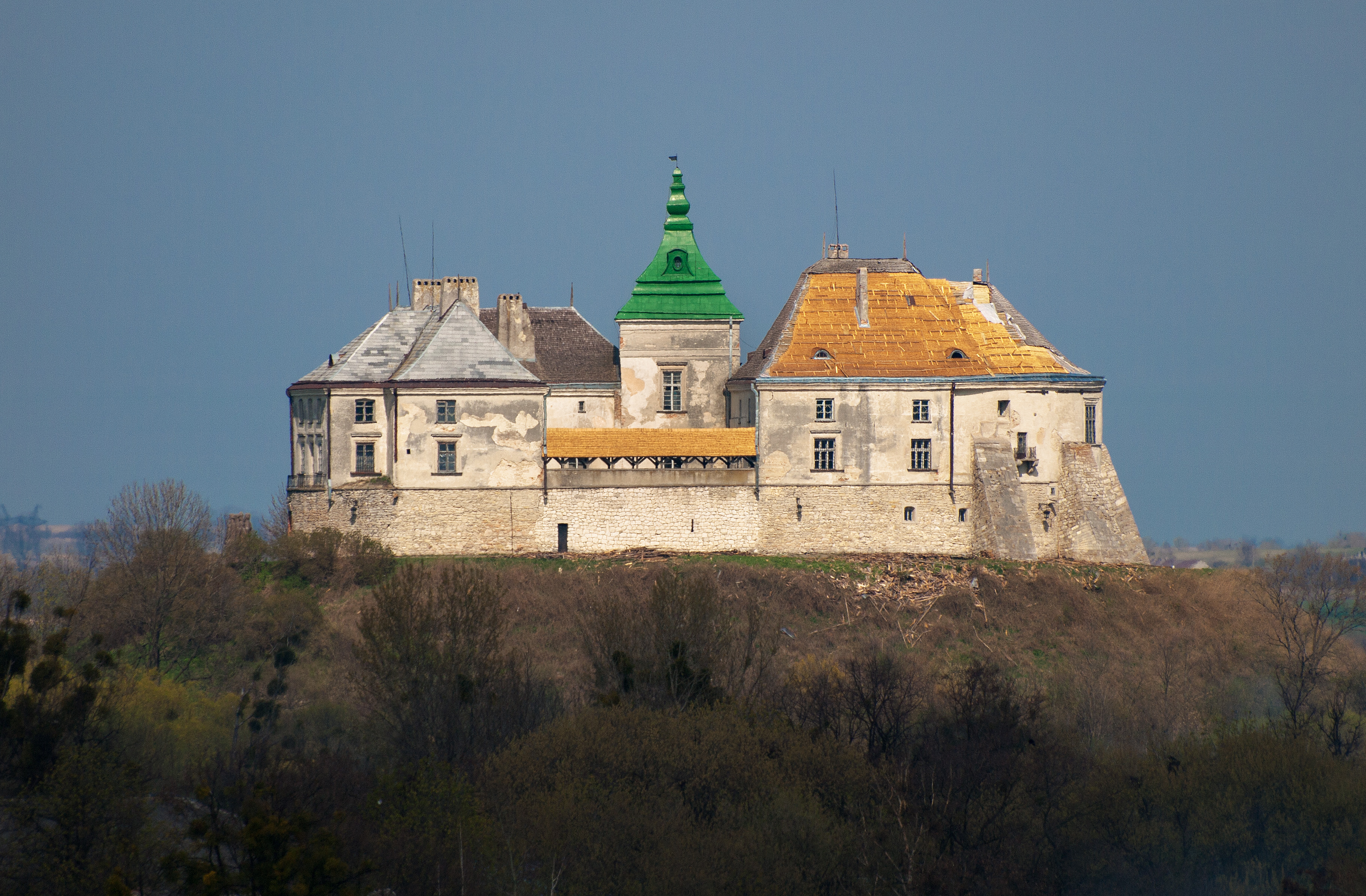
Jakub Sobieski's return to Poland after 1717 and his subsequent reconciliation with Augustus II allowed him to regain property that the King-Grand Duke had confiscated in Olesko.

Jakub Sobieski received a favorable sentence during the Silent Sejm in 1717, which enabled him to return to the Polish–Lithuanian Commonwealth and recover his family property which had been confiscated by King Augustus. He returned to Poland and reconciled with the king, and subsequently settled in the Sobieski's ancestral castle in Żółkiew. After falling out of favor with Holy Roman Emperor Charles VI for allowing his daughter Maria Clementina Sobieska to marry James Francis Edward Stuart he lost the principality of Oława in 1719, but was able to regain his Silesian holdings in 1722. Sobieski would return to Oława periodically between 1722 and 1734. He spent the last years of his life managing his properties, travelling between his residences in Ukraine and Silesia, while devoting himself to philanthropy.

=== Death ===
Jakub Ludwik Sobieski died of a stroke on 19 December 1737 in Żółkiew (now Ukraine) and is buried there. His oldest surviving daughter Maria Karolina, inherited his vast land holdings which included 11 cities and 140 villages.

== Sobieski's Legacy in Oława ==
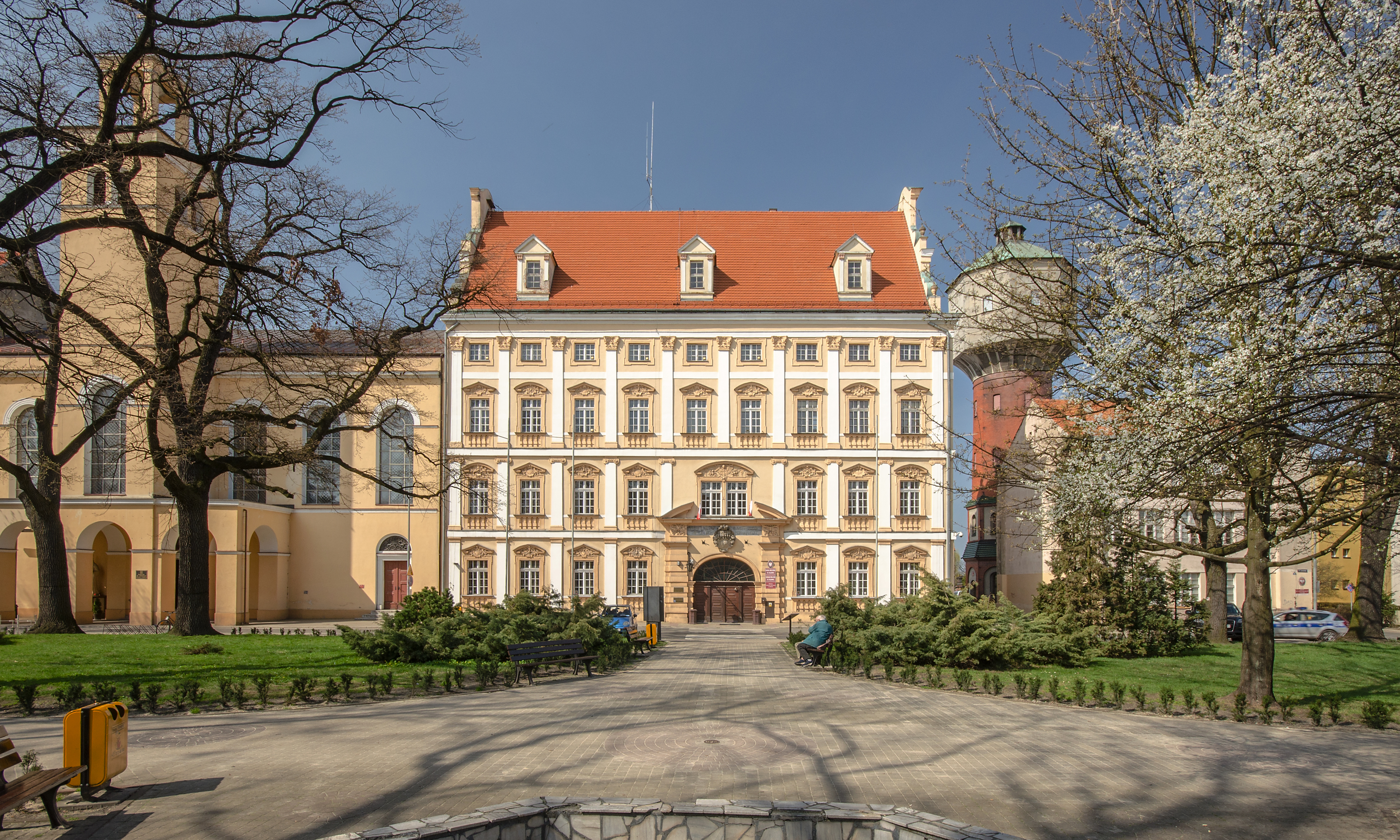
During the reign of Jakub Sobieski, Oława Castle received new interior furnishings and the library was enlarged. After the prince left Oława in 1734, the structure began to decline. The Prussians subsequently located a hospital and a bakery in the castle.

The connection to the Polish-Lithuanian state which Sobieski's rule brought to Oława set this part of Lower Silesia on a different trajectory, and thanks to it the Polish language was preserved here long after Jakub' death in 1737. After the end of the Silesian Wars in 1763, the city along with most of Silesia was annexed by the Kingdom of Prussia, which immediately set out to Germanize their subjects. Yet the population remained Polish speaking in the vicinity of Oława. Julius Roger in his ethnographic book on Silesian folk songs recorded a Polish tune from Oława in 1863. In his book "Schlesien: eine Landeskunde für das deutsche Volk" published in 1896, outstanding German geographer Joseph Partsch expresses his surprise that:

...it is difficult to understand how it could have happened that on the west side of the Odra River, in the Oława district and in the vicinity of parts of Wrocław and Strzelin, that a completely dense territory of Polish-speaking residents could survive, in an area which contains many important roads that extends on all sides from the great transport center which is Wrocław...

After World War II German Silesia was ceded to the Polish People's Republic. Since then, a number of sites within Oława have been renamed to commemorate Jakub Sobieski.

== Issue ==
1. Maria Leopoldyna (30 April 1693 – 12 July 1695).
2. Maria Kazimiera (20 January 1695 – 18 May 1723), engaged to Charles XII of Sweden.
3. Maria Karolina (15 November 1697 – 8 May 1740) married (1) Frederick Maurice de la Tour d'Auvergne (2) Charles Godefroy de La Tour d'Auvergne and had issue.
4. Jan (21 October 1698 – July 1699).
5. Maria Klementyna (18 July 1702 – 24 January 1735) married James Francis Edward Stuart and had issue (Charles Edward Stuart and Henry Benedict Stuart)
6. Maria Magdalena (born and died 3 August 1704).

== See also ==
- Royal elections in Poland
- Oława
- Zhovkva
