= Laura Martinozzi =

Duchess consort of Modena (1639–1687)

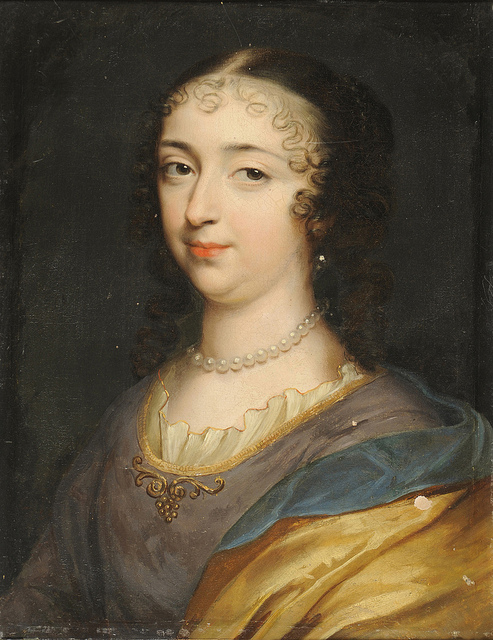
- Portrait of Laura as Duchess of Modena

Duchess consort of Modena and Reggio
- Tenure: 14 October 1658 – 16 July 1662
- Born: 22 April 1639; Fano, Papal State
- Died: 19 July 1687 (aged 48); Rome, Papal State
- Burial: San Vincenzo, Modena
- Spouse: Alfonso IV d'Este, Duke of Modena (m. 1655; died 1662)
- Issue: Maria, Queen of England, Scotland, and Ireland; Francesco II, Duke of Modena
- House: Martinozzi
- Father: Girolamo Martinozzi
- Mother: Laura Mazarini

Laura Martinozzi, Duchess of Modena and Reggio (22 April 1639 – 19 July 1687), niece of the Chief minister of France Jules Cardinal Mazarin and one of the Mazarinettes, by marriage became Duchess consort of Modena and Reggio, and following the death of her husband, she acted as regent for her minor son during 1662–1674. She was the mother of Mary of Modena, Queen consort of England, Scotland and Ireland.

== Biography ==
=== Family and early years ===
Born in Fano on 22 April 1639 as the second daughter of Count Girolamo Martinozzi and his wife Laura Margherita Mazzarini, Laura spent her childhood in Rome, where her father served as Mayor in the palace of the Roman Curia. In 1653, Laura, her older sister Anna Maria (1637 – 4 February 1672) and their widowed mother moved to Paris to live with her maternal uncle, Cardinal Mazarin.

The Cardinal thought of marrying Laura to Charles Emmanuel II, Duke of Savoy, but then he began to plan her marriage to Alfonso d'Este, heir of the Duchy of Modena. This union, like the marriage of King Louis XIV to Isabella d'Este, were conceived with the purpose to strengthen the allied relationship between France and Modena. However, in the case of the marriage between the French king and the Modenese princess, it was never materialized due to Cardinal Mazarin's decisive opposition to the marriage (which took place in 1654) between Francesco I d'Este, Duke of Modena and Lucrezia Barberini, great-niece of Pope Urban VIII.

=== Duchess consort of Modena ===
At the end of April 1655, France and Modena finally agreed on the marriage of Laura and the Hereditary Prince of Modena. The parties exchanged clauses of the marriage contract, one of which indicated the bride's dowry of 90,000 livres. At the end of May, the engagement took place and a marriage contract was signed. Finally, on 30 May, the marriage per procura was concluded at the Château de Compiègne, in which the groom was represented by Prince Eugene Maurice of Savoy, Count of Soissons. The wedding celebrations lasted two weeks. On 13 June, Laura left Paris, and on 16 July, she arrived in Modena. On the day of her arrival, a performance was given in her honour at the ducal theatre.

Laura's first child, a son, was born on 8 November 1657 and named Francesco after his paternal grandfather; however, he died on 10 April 1658 aged 5 months. Her second child, a daughter, was born prematurely six months later, on 5 October, but survived: named Maria Beatrice Eleonora Anna Margherita Isabella, she later became Queen consort of England, Scotland and Ireland as the second wife of King James II and VII. Nine days later, on 14 October, Laura's father-in-law died, and her husband became Duke of Modena and Reggio under the name of Alfonso IV and, with the rank of generalissimo, led the army of the French kingdom in Italian lands. The new Duchess consort gave birth to her third and last child less than two years later, on 6 March 1660: a second son, also named Francesco after his paternal grandfather, who eventually succeeded his father as Duke of Modena and Reggio. Cardinal Mazarin died in March 1661, leaving Laura an annual income of 40,000 livres, as well as a capital of 150,000 livres and 40,000 livres in jewellery and furniture.

=== Regent of Modena ===
On 16 July 1662, Duke Alfonso IV died, leaving Laura a widow with two young children. After the death of her husband, the Dowager Duchess was appointed regent for her two-year-old son, who became Duke of Modena and Reggio under the name Francesco II. A year earlier, her late husband made Laura the owner of the Lordship of Gualtieri, a vassal fief of the Dukes of Modena.

According to historians, the Dowager Duchess was a reasonable ruler. She had a firm and strong-willed character, which she showed not only in the fight against crime in her son's possessions, but also in relation to the local nobility, whose representatives tried to take advantage of the Duke's infancy for their own interests.

After becoming regent, Laura brought into her council ministers who had proven effective and devoted to the House of Este. Count Girolamo Graziani, jurist Bartolomeo Gatti, Cardinal Rinaldo d'Este, Cesare Ignazio d'Este, Marquess of Montecchio, and Laura's confessor, the Jesuit Andrea Garimberti, helped her rule the duchy. Through the efforts of the latter, many positions in the duchy were received by clerics. Over time, she managed to improve the economic situation in the duchy by reducing the cost of maintaining the court. At the same time, she spent a lot of money on the repair of the ducal palace and the construction of the convent of the Visitation Sisters, in Modena, as well as for the reconstruction of the Church of St. Augustine. Laura's building projects were supervised by architects Gaspare Vigarani and Giangiacomo Monti. In 1671, she allowed the opening of a ghetto for Jews in Reggio.

The Dowager Duchess tried to pursue an independent foreign policy. But in 1673, at the request of King Louis XIV and the advice of Pope Clement X, she was forced to agree to the marriage of her fifteen-year-old daughter with the Duke of York, heir presumptive of his childless brother King Charles II of England and old enough to be the princess' father. Initially, Laura was against this marriage, and the bride herself wanted to become a nun. The wedding ceremony took place in London on 5 October 1673. During her absence, the Dowager Duchess entrusted her son to the care of ministers; however, Marquess Cesare Ignazio d'Este, taking advantage of the situation, was able to win over the young duke and turn him against his mother. Laura returned to Modena on 5 March 1674, and the next day, celebrating his fourteenth birthday, Francesco II dissolved the regency council and assumed his personal rule. The Dowager Duchess did not immediately, but nevertheless, submit to pressure from her son and surrendered the regency.

=== Later life ===
At the end of 1674, Laura left Modena, but in the summer of 1675, she returned. In January 1676, she moved to Rome. The Marquess of Montecchio perused the letters of the Dowager Duchess to her son. Cesare Ignazio d'Este persuaded Francesco II not to answer Laura's letters, who asked him to return the property bequeathed to her by her uncle, Cardinal Mazarin. Through the efforts of his cousin, the conflict between the duke and his mother became unavoidable. Laura stayed in Rome until 1679. In the same year, after visiting her Lordship of Gualtieri, she moved to London to the side of her daughter Maria Beatrice, from where she arrived in Brussels. In this city, Laura lived until 1684, having briefly visited Modena in 1680 and London in 1682 and 1684. In 1684, she again arrived in Rome. In 1686, her opponent, Cesare Ignazio d'Este, was removed from the court in Modena. From November 1686 to February 1687, Francesco II visited his mother twice in Rome, whose health had deteriorated. The headaches that had tormented Laura for several previous years worsened. The body of the Dowager Duchess was exhausted by fever. She died in Rome on 9 July 1687.

According to her will, Laura was buried in the convent of the Visitation Sisters in Modena next to the ducal palace. The monastery was abolished in 1881, and military barracks were located in its building. In 1925, Laura's remains were transferred from the former convent to the Este Chapel in San Vincenzo, Modena. The Dowager Duchess bequeathed large sums of money to the poor and temples. Almost all of her property in Italy was received by Francesco II. Maria Beatrice got Laura's capital in France.

== Issue ==
- Francesco d'Este (8 November 1657 – 10 April 1658), died in infancy.
- Maria Beatrice Anna Margherita Isabella d'Este (5 October 1658 – 7 May 1718) married James II of England and had issue; known as Mary of Modena.
- Francesco II d'Este, Duke of Modena (6 March 1660 – 6 September 1694), married Margherita Maria Farnese, no issue.

== Ancestry ==
8. Giovanni Battista Martinozzi
4. Vincenzo Martinozzi
9. Bianca Lanci
2. Girolamo Martinozzi
10. Matteo Marcolini
5. Margherita Marcolini
11. Tommasa Bertozzi
1. Laura Martinozzi
12. Girolamo Mazzarino
6. Pietro Mazzarino
13. Margherita de Franchis Passavera
3. Laura Margherita Mazzarini
14. Giulio Buffalini
7. Ortensia Buffalini
15. Françoise de Bellon

== Bibliography ==
- Buell Hale, Sarah Josepha (1874). Woman's Record: Or, Sketches of All Distinguished Women, from the Creation to A.D. 1868. Arranged in Four Eras, with Selections from Authoresses of Each Era... Harper.
- Iotti, Roberta (2009). Laura Martinozzi d'Este: fille de France, dux Mutinæ : studi intorno a Laura Martinozzi reggente del Ducato di Modena (1662–1674) (in Italian). Il Bulino. ISBN 978-8-88-625182-2.
- Littell, Eliakim; Littell, Robert S. (1857). The Living Age. Vol. LV. Living Age Company Incorporated.
