= Louis Armand I, Prince of Conti =

Louis Armand I de Bourbon
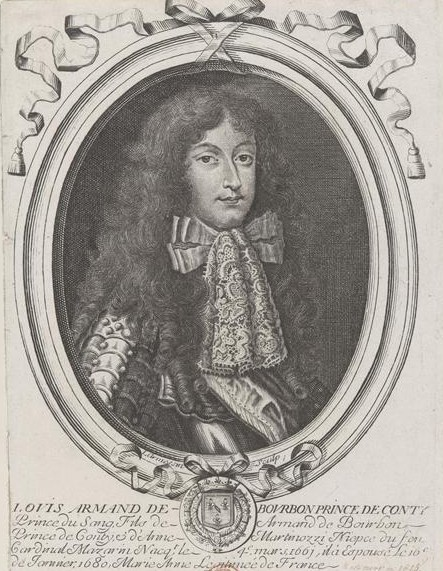
- 17th-century engraving

Prince of Conti
- Reign: 26 February 1666 – 9 November 1685
- Predecessor: Armand, Prince of Conti
- Successor: François Louis, Prince of Conti
- Born: 30 April 1661; Hôtel de Conti (quai Malaquais), Paris, France
- Died: 9 November 1685 (aged 24); Palace of Fontainebleau, Seine-et-Marne, France
- Spouse: Marie Anne de Bourbon
- House: Bourbon
- Father: Armand, Prince of Conti
- Mother: Anne Marie Martinozzi

Louis Armand de Bourbon (30 April 1661 – 9 November 1685) was Prince of Conti from 1666 to his death. He was the son of Armand de Bourbon and Anne Marie Martinozzi, the daughter of Girolamo Martinozzi and Laura Margherita Mazzarini, elder sister of Cardinal Mazarin. As a member of the reigning House of Bourbon, he was a Prince du Sang. He was a son-in-law of King Louis XIV of France, who was his namesake.

== Biography ==
Louis Armand was born at the Hôtel de Conti (quai Malaquais) in Paris, France. In August 1679 he acted as the groom in the proxy marriage where Marie Louise d'Orléans married Charles II of Spain. In 1680 he married Marie Anne de Bourbon, the illegitimate daughter of King Louis XIV and his first mistress, Louise de La Vallière. The bride and groom were respectively thirteen and eighteen years old at the time. Since neither of them had been instructed on what to expect on their first night together, it ended up in disaster, with Marie Anne fleeing in despair and the prince not wanting to share the bed of a woman again.

He served with distinction in Flanders in 1683, and, against the wish of the King, went to Hungary, where he helped the Imperialists defeat the Turks at Gran in the same year. He died on 9 November 1685 at the Palace of Fontainebleau from smallpox, which he contracted from his wife. While she recovered after some time, the Prince succumbed after five days.

Having no descendants, he was succeeded as Prince of Conti by his younger brother, François Louis de Bourbon.

== Ancestry ==
Ancestors of Louis Armand I, Prince of Conti

8. Henri I, Prince of Condé
4. Henri II, Prince of Condé
9. Charlotte Catherine de La Trémoille
2. Armand, Prince of Conti
10. Henri I, duc de Montmorency
5. Charlotte Marguerite de Montmorency
11. Louise de Budos
1. Louis Armand de Bourbon
12. Vincenzo Martinozzi
6. Girolamo Martinozzi
13. Margherita Marcolini
3. Anne Marie Martinozzi
14. Pietro Mazzarini
7. Laura Margherita Mazzarini
15. Ortensia Buffalini

== Sources ==
- Hillman, Jennifer (2016). Female Piety and the Catholic Reformation in France. Routledge.
- Rowlands, Guy (2002). The Dynastic State and the Army under Louis XIV. Cambridge University Press.
- Wanner, Raymond E. (1975). Claude Fleury (1640–1723) as an Educational Historiographer and Thinker. Martinus Nijhoff.

Louis Armand I, Prince of Conti House of Bourbon Born: 1629
French royalty
Preceded by Armand de Bourbon-Conti, prince de Conti	Prince de Conti; 1666–1685	Succeeded by François Louis de Bourbon, prince de Conti
