= Anne Marie Martinozzi =

- Princess of Conti
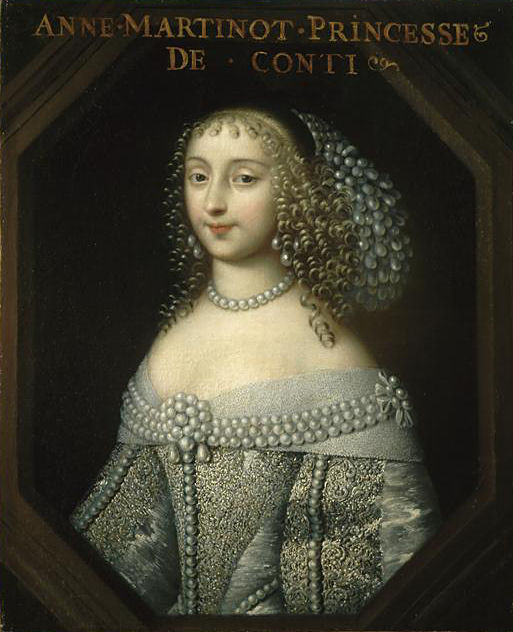
- Born: 1637; Rome, Italy
- Died: 4 February 1672 (aged 34–35); Hôtel de Conti (quai Conti), Paris, France
- Spouse: Armand de Bourbon, Prince of Conti
- Issue: Louis de Bourbon; Louis Armand de Bourbon; François Louis de Bourbon
- House: Martinozzi
- Father: Girolamo Martinozzi
- Mother: Laura Margherita Mazzarini

Anne Marie Martinozzi, Princess of Conti (1637 – 4 February 1672) was a French aristocrat and court official. She was a niece of King Louis XIV's chief minister Cardinal Mazarin, and the wife of Armand de Bourbon, Prince of Conti. She became the mother of the libertine François Louis, Prince of Conti, le Grand Conti. Her marriage to the Prince of Conti made her a princesse du Sang. She served as Surintendante de la Maison de la Reine for the queen dowager, Anne of Austria, between 1657 and 1666.

== Biography ==
Anne Marie Martinozzi was born in Rome to Girolamo Martinozzi of Fano and Laura Margherita Mazzarini, the daughter of Pietro Mazzarini who served as a constable of Constable Colonna and Ortensia Bufalini. She was the elder sister of Jules Mazarin, who was Cardinal and Prime Minister during the minority of Louis XIV.

Her paternal grandparents were Vinzenco Martinozzi, who had served as Majordomo at the Court of Cardinal Francesco Barberini, and Margherita Marcolini.

Anne Marie spent her childhood in Rome, where her father served as Mayor in the palace of the Roman Curia. In 1647, Anne-Marie and her Mancini cousins were summoned by Mazarin to France.While in France, Anne Marie and her cousins were placed under the protection of Anne of Austria, who even oversaw their education.

Anne Marie's father died in 1650, and in 1653 her widowed mother took her younger daughter Laura with her and moved to Paris to live with her brother, Cardinal Mazarin.

Anne-Marie and her female cousins, the Mancini sisters: Laura, Marie, Olympe, Hortense came to be known as the Mazarinettes by the French court. Mazarin managed to secure advantageous marriages for all of them. Anne Marie's sister Laura married Alfonso IV d'Este, Duke of Modena and her daughter (Anne Marie's niece) Mary of Modena, would be the future Queen of England when she married James II of England.

Anne Marie was described as being possessed of a beautiful appearance, blonde hair, a sweet temper, generous, with a lot of wit and intelligence. Although generally considered gentle and modest, she sometimes had blunt manners that disconcerted and offended people.

== Marriage ==
Like the other Mazarinettes it was expected that Anne Marie's uncle would arrange a good match for her, and plans for her marriage were begun very soon after her arrival in Paris. The Duke of Candale was suggested but it met with opposition from his father the Duke d`Epernon who saw it as a mésalliance for his son.The young duke could claim royal ancestry as his mother Gabrielle-Angélique de Verneuil, was a legitimized daughter of Henry IV of France.

In 1654, Anne Marie instead married Armand de Bourbon, Prince of Conti. It was said that the prince of Conti was so eager to make an alliance with the cardinal that he had claimed The marriage took place at the Palace du Louvre 22 February 1654, and was officiated by the Archbishop of Bourges. After the marriage ceremony the play Le Cid was performed, followed by a banquet and a ball.

Anne brought a dowry of 200,000 ecu to the marriage, the equivalent of about $500,000 today.

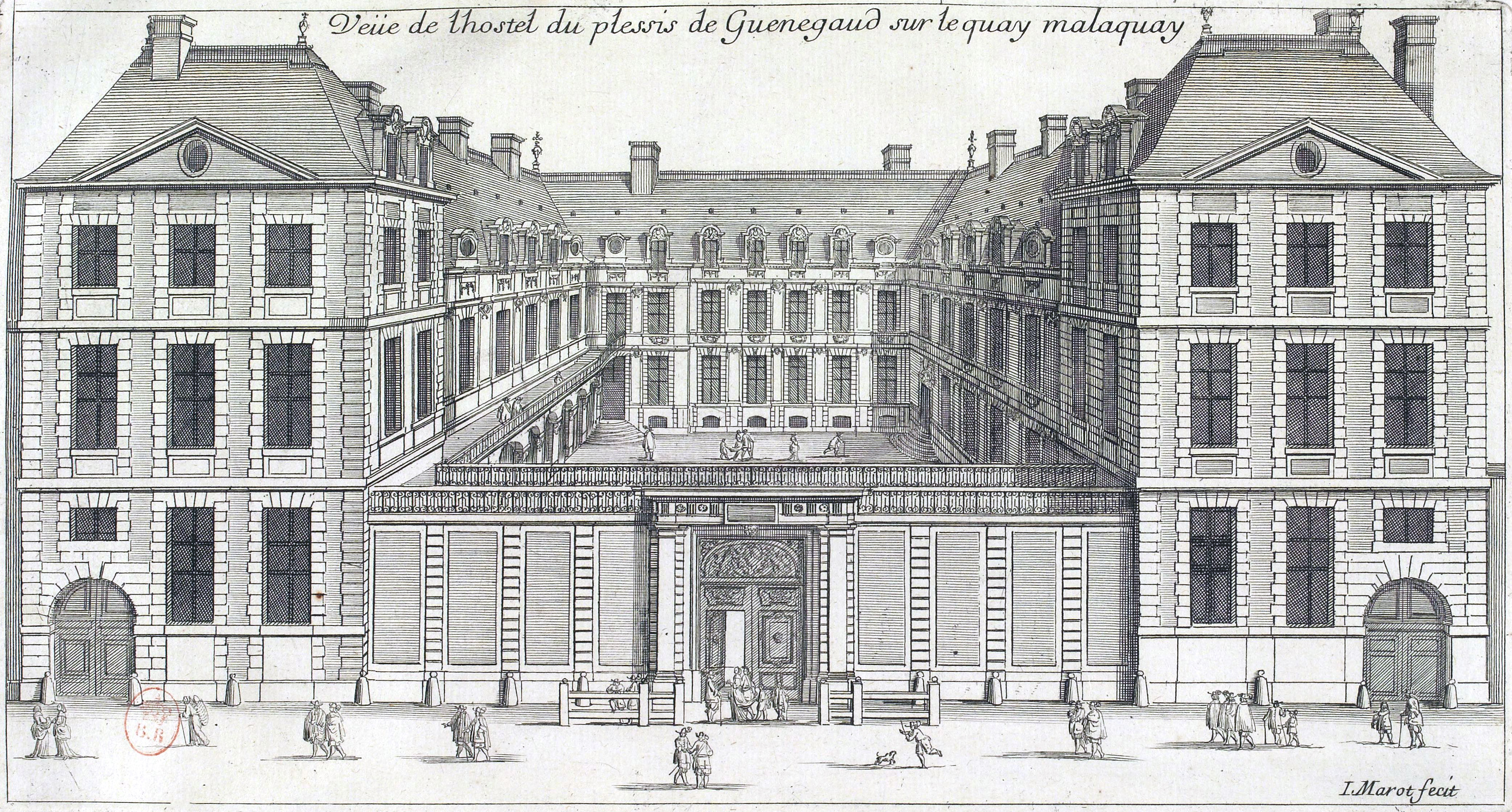
Hôtel de Conti engraved by Jean Marot from L'Architecture française (1686)

In 1660 she and her husband began living at an hôtel on the quai Malaquais, which became known as the Hôtel de Conti.

Before their marriage Conti had contracted syphilis which he infected Anne Marie with. The couple tried to cure it by all possible means. When this failed, her husband turned to religion and rejected his old life. He retreated to Languedoc where he immersed himself in reading, writing, and studying religious literature.

Eventually Anne Marie was influenced by her husband and like him became a fervent jansenist and extreme in her piety.

Anne Marie's cousin Hortense who had married the Duke of La Meilleraye, who was insanely jealous and abusive towards her, was given the choice of escaping him by going to live at the Hotel de Conti with Anne Marie and her husband or entering a convent. She chose the convent as she found the rigid piety of her cousin and her husband more than she could bear.

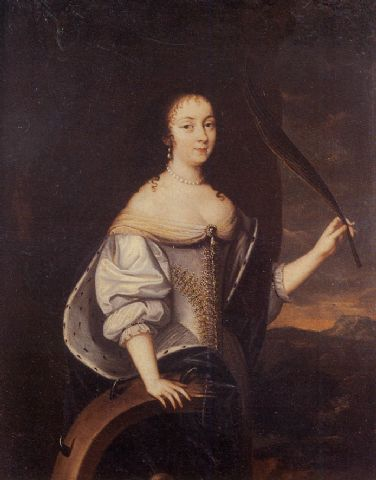
Follower of Constantin Netscher - Anne Marie Martinozzi as Saint Catherine of Alexandria

They had two sons, Louis Armand (born 1661) and François Louis (born 1664). Her husband died in 1666, after which Anne Marie refused to marry again and instead devoted herself to her sons and a pious life. Close with her sister-in-law, the Duchess of Longueville; they were referred to as "les Mères de l'Église" [English: mothers of the church] by Madame de Sevigne.

She acted as the godmother by proxy to le Grand Dauphin for Henrietta Maria of France, the dauphins own aunt (24 March 1668).

In 1670, Anne Marie exchanged her townhouse on the quai Malaquais and her beautiful country house in Bouchet for the Hôtel Guénégaud on the quai de Nevers. The house on the quai Malaquais became the Hôtel du Plessis-Guénégaud, her new house became the Hôtel de Conti, and the quai de Nevers became the quai de Conti.

== Death ==
Anne-Marie died in Paris from an apoplexy at her hôtel on the quai Conti in 1672; she was aged roughly 35.

Her remains were interred in the church of Saint-André-des-Arts, and as requested by Anne-Marie herself it was an humble funeral ceremony with a sermon preached by the jesuit bishop and chaplain of the princess, Gabriel de Roquette.

Anne-Marie's son François Louis later had a funeral monument commissioned from the artist François Girardon.

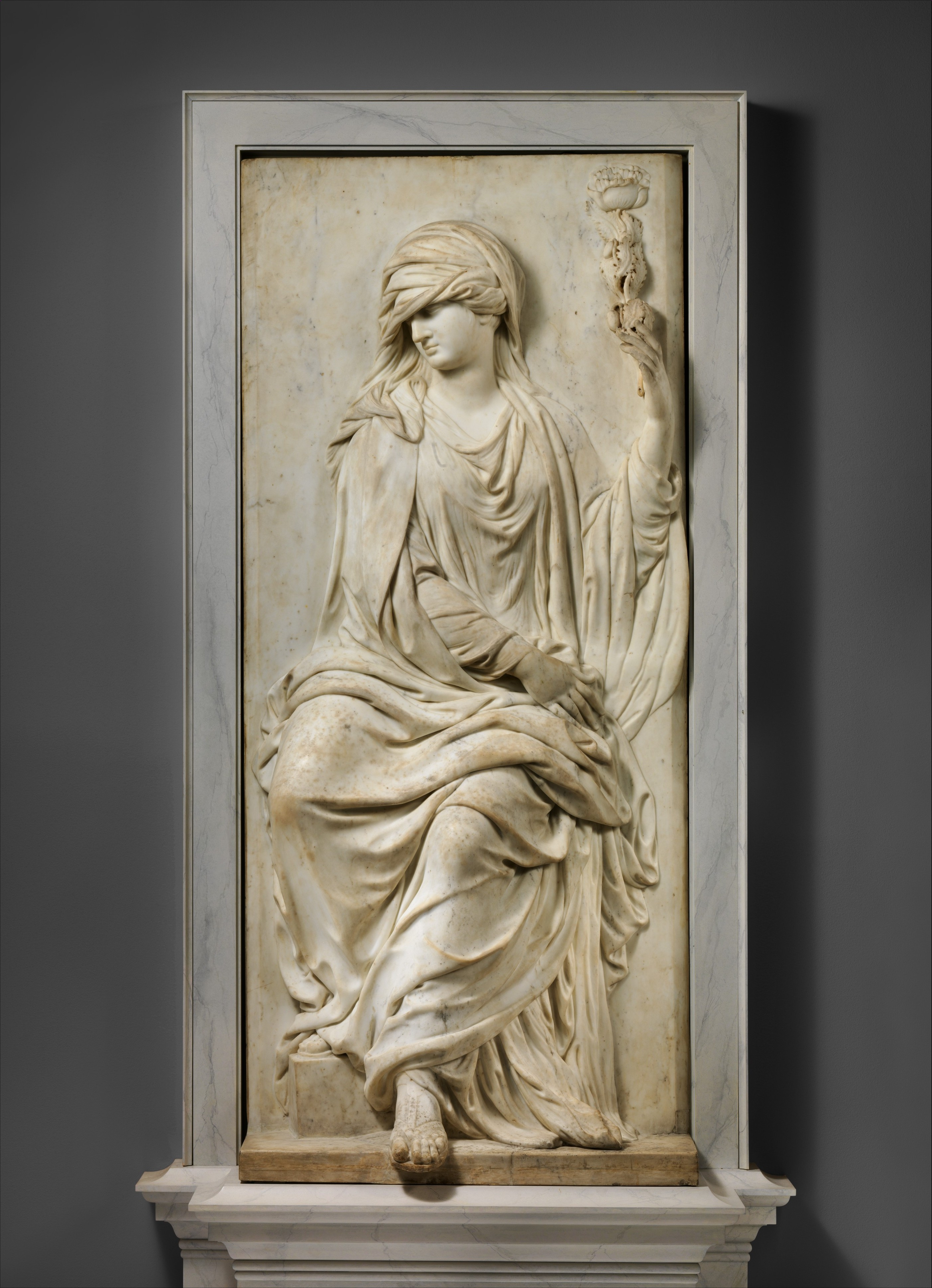
Metropolitan Museum of Art

In 1794, during the French Revolution Anne-Marie's tomb was desecrated and her remains were placed in the catacombs.The church itself was demolished in the early 19th century, but not before the surviving monuments had been dismantled and removed to Musée des Monuments.

In 1809 the relief was recarved and placed in the park of Chateau de Malmaison, the favored estate of Empress Josephine. It was sold to the Metropolotan Museum of Art in 1939.

== Issue ==
Anne Marie and her husband had five children, two of whom reached adulthood:

- Stillborn son (b. 1655)
- Stillborn son (b. 1657)
- Louis de Bourbon (Hôtel de Conti, 6 September 1658 - Hôtel de Conti, 14 September 1658)
- Louis Armand de Bourbon, Prince of Conti (Hôtel de Conti (quai Malaquais), 4 April 1661- Palace of Fontainebleau 9 November 1685)
  - married Marie Anne de Bourbon, his cousin, in 1680.
- François Louis de Bourbon, Prince of Conti, nicknamed Le Grand Conti (The Great Conti) (Hôtel de Conti (quai Malaquais), 30 April 1664 - Hôtel de Conti (quai Conti), 22 February 1709)
  - married Marie Thérèse de Bourbon in 1680; the couple were the titular monarchs of Poland in 1697.

Among Anne Marie´s descendants were: Louis Philippe I, King of the French; the present-day pretenders to the throne of France and Italy; and the kings of Spain and Belgium.

== Ancestry ==
Ancestors of Anne Marie Martinozzi

8. Giovanni Battista Martinozzi
4. Vincenzo Martinozzi
9. Bianca Lanci
2. Girolamo Martinozzi
10. Matteo Marcolini
5. Margherita Marcolini
11. Tommasa Bertozzi
1. Anne Marie Martinozzi
12. Giulio Mazzarini
6. Pietro Mazzarini
13. Margherita de Franchis-Passavera
3. Laura Margherita Mazzarini
14. Ottavio Buffalini
7. Ortensia Buffalini
15. Françoise de Bellon (or Francesca de' Bellone-Turina)

== See also ==
- Mazarinettes

== Sources ==
- Hillman, Jennifer (2016). Female Piety and the Catholic Reformation in France. Routledge.
