= Olympia Mancini, Countess of Soissons =

Olympia Mancini
- Countess of Soissons
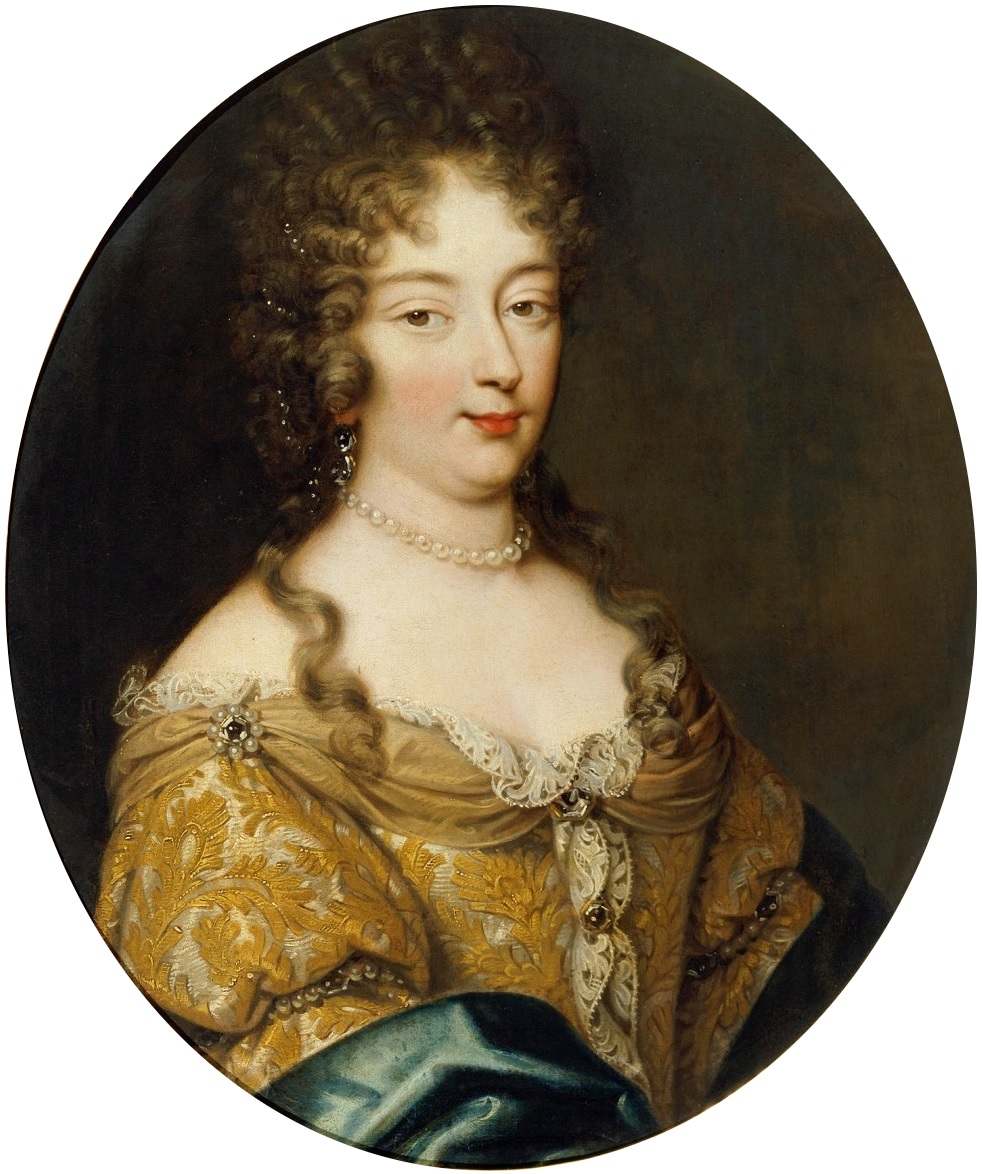
- Portrait by Mignard
- Born: 11 July 1638; Rome, Papal States
- Died: 9 October 1708 (aged 70); Brussels, Spanish Netherlands
- Spouse: Eugene Maurice of Savoy (m. 1657; died 1673)
- Issue: Louis Thomas, Count of Soissons; Philippe, "Abbot of Soissons"; Prince Louis Julius of Savoy; Emmanuel Philibert, Count of Dreux; Prince Eugene; Marie Jeanne, Mademoiselle de Soissons; Louise Philiberte, Mademoiselle de Dreux; Françoise, Mademoiselle de Dreux
Names
- Olympia Mancini
- Father: Michele Lorenzo Mancini
- Mother: Geronima Mazzarini

Olympia Mancini, Countess of Soissons (French: Olympe Mancini; 11 July 1638 – 9 October 1708) was the second-eldest of the five celebrated Mancini sisters who, along with two of their female Martinozzi cousins, were known at the court of King Louis XIV of France as the Mazarinettes because their uncle was Louis XIV's chief minister, Cardinal Mazarin. Olympia was later to become the mother of the famous Austrian general Prince Eugene of Savoy. She also involved herself in various court intrigues, including the notorious Affair of the Poisons, which led to her expulsion from France.

== Family and early years ==
Olympia Mancini was born on 11 July 1638 and grew up in Rome. Her father was Baron Lorenzo Mancini, an Italian aristocrat who was also a necromancer and astrologer. After his death in 1650, her mother, Geronima Mazzarini, brought her daughters from Rome to Paris in the hope of using the influence of her brother, Cardinal Mazarin, to gain them advantageous marriages.

The other Mancini sisters were:

- Laura Mancini (1636–1657), the eldest, who married Louis de Bourbon, Duke of Vendôme, the grandson of King Henry IV and his mistress, Gabrielle d'Estrées.
- Marie Mancini (1639–1715), the third sister, was considered the least beautiful of the sisters, but she obtained the biggest prize of all: Louis XIV. He was so besotted with her that he wanted to marry her, but he was constrained to give her up for political reasons. She later married Prince Lorenzo Colonna, who remarked that he was surprised to find her a virgin, as one does not expect to find 'innocence among the loves of kings'. (from Antonia Fraser's book Love and Louis XIV)
- Hortense Mancini (1646–1699), the beauty of the family, escaped her abusive husband, Armand Charles de la Porte, Duke of La Meilleraye, and went to London, where she became the mistress of King Charles II.
- Marie Anne Mancini (1649–1714) married Maurice Godefroy de La Tour d'Auvergne, Duke of Bouillon, a nephew of the famous field marshal Turenne.

The Mancinis were not the only female family members that Cardinal Mazarin brought to the French court. The others were Olympia's first cousins, daughters of Mazarin's eldest sister. The elder, Laura Martinozzi, married Alfonso IV d'Este, Duke of Modena and was the mother of Mary of Modena, second wife of James II of England. The younger, Anne Marie Martinozzi, married Armand, Prince de Conti.

The Mancini also had three brothers: Paul, Philippe, and Alphonse. Paul Jules Mancini was a twin brother to Laura Victoire, the oldest of Olympia's sisters.

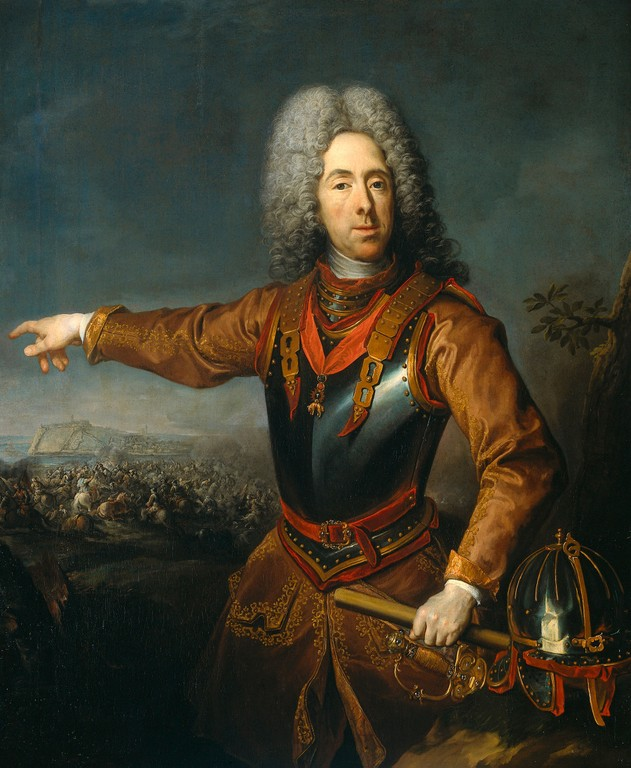
Jacob van Schuppen's portrait of Olympia's son, Prince Eugene of Savoy

== Marriage ==
Olympia was married on 24 February 1657 to Prince Eugène-Maurice of Savoy, Count of Soissons (1633–1673), by whom she had eight children, amongst whom was the famous field marshal Prince Eugene of Savoy. At the royal court, the couple were addressed as Monsieur le Comte and Madame la comtesse.

== Court life ==
Soon after her sister Marie's marriage to Prince Lorenzo Onofrio Colonna, Olympia was appointed Superintendent of the Queen's Household which gave her authority over and above that of all of the other ladies at Court with the exception of the Princesses of The Blood.

Olympia was, by nature, an intriguer. Shortly after her marriage, she became involved in various intrigues at court. There were rumours that prior to her marriage, she was briefly the mistress of Louis XIV. While not exactly beautiful, Olympia was described as possessing great charm and indisputable fascination. Her hair was dark, her complexion brilliant, her eyes black and vivacious, and her figure plump and rounded.

After her marriage, she allied herself with Louis XIV's sister-in-law, Henriette, Duchess of Orléans, with whom he had a gallant friendship. About the latter, the Queen Mother Anne of Austria was deeply concerned about Louis XIV spending much time entertaining himself away from his wife, in the company of other women including the Duchess of Orléans, her maids of honor and Olympia. In a letter from Mademoiselle de Fouilloux, she details how Olympia was very upset that Louise, Mademoiselle de La Vallière had attracted royal favours from the King. She had wanted to be the only one in whom he had entire trust, which she had managed to gain. Mademoiselle de Fouilloux, in her letter, stipulated that Olympia was well aware that Louise had worked for a long time for this goal. Ultimately, Louis XIV fell in love with Louise de La Vallière, and Olympia turned against her.

== The Affaire des Poisons ==
Olympia was accused in 1679 in the Affaire des Poisons of having plotted with La Voisin to poison Louise de La Vallière, of having poisoned her husband, three servants, as well as the king's aunt Henrietta of England. She was even said to have threatened the King himself with the words, "come back to me, or you will be sorry".

She was asked to leave the royal court in January 1680 and immediately left France for Brussels, thereby avoiding arrest and being put to trial for involvement in the Affaire des Poisons.

She applied in 1682 for permission to return to France, but was not allowed.

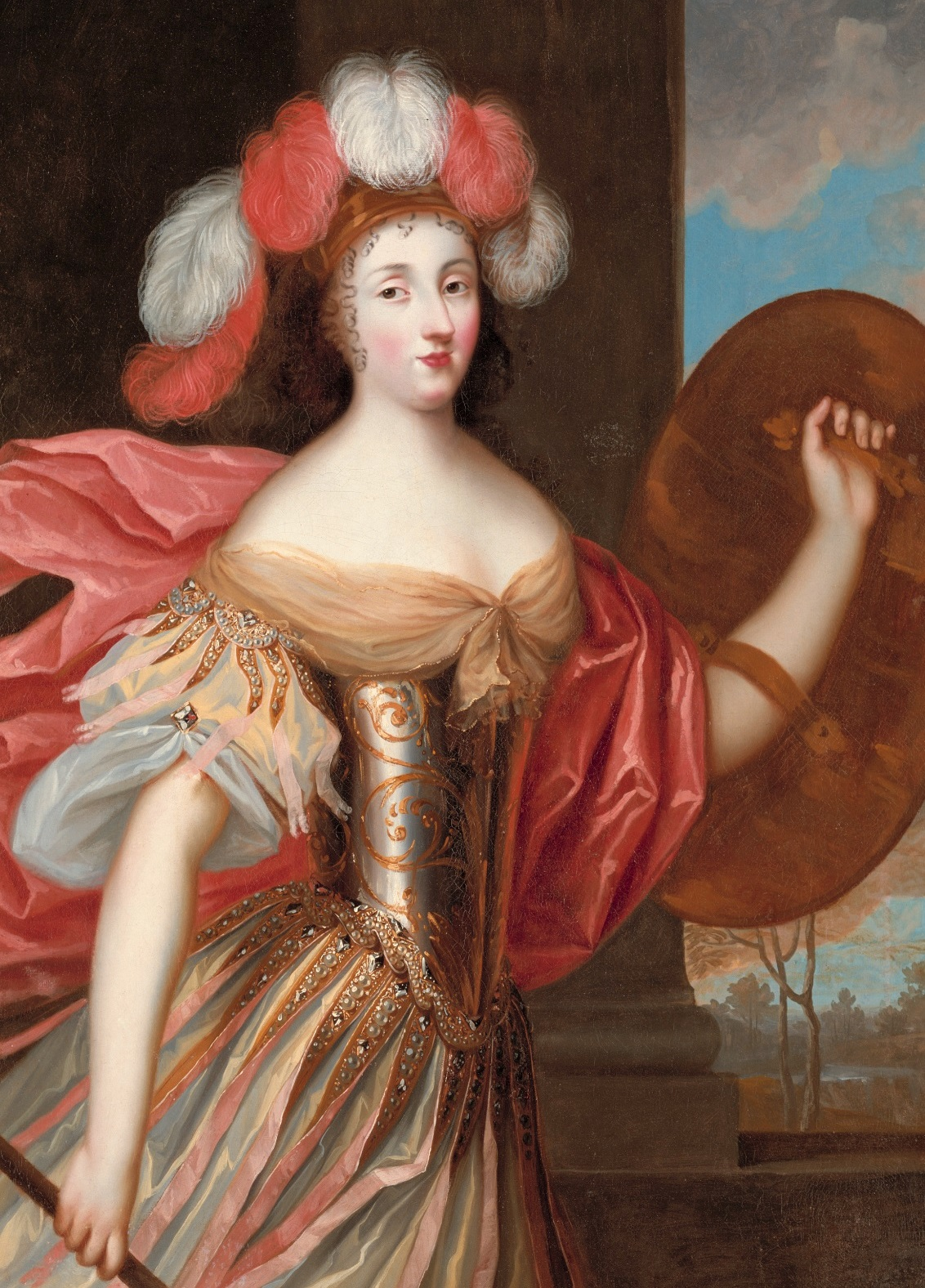
Portrait of Olympia Mancini depicted as the goddess Athena. Painted before 1695 by Pierre Mignard.

== Exile ==
She continued from Brussels to Spain, where she was well received and lived from 1686 to 1689, being celebrated by Spanish high society and receiving French guests in her salon. In 1690, she was suspected of having poisoned Queen Maria Luisa of Spain, the daughter of Henriette and niece of Louis XIV, whose confidence she had gained after having taken up residence in Spain, following her expulsion from France as a result of the Poison Affair.

On 23 January 1690, she was ordered to leave the Spanish court; she moved back to Brussels, claiming her innocence. Occasionally, she travelled to England with her two sisters Marie and Hortense. In Brussels, she gave her patronage to musicians Pietro Antonio Fiocco and Henry Desmarest. She died in Brussels on October 9, 1708, just three months after her son Eugene's victory at The Battle of Oudenarde on July 11, 1708, which was her 70th birthday.

== Issue ==
1. Louis Thomas, Count of Soissons (1657–1702) married Uranie de La Cropte de Beauvais (1655–1717) and had issue.
2. Philippe, "Abbot of Soissons" (1659–1693) unmarried.
3. Louis Julius, Cavaliere of Savoy (1660–1683) killed at the battle of Petronell against the Turks known as the Cavaliere di Savoia.
4. Emanuel Philibert, Count of Dreux (1662–1676) unmarried.
5. Prince Eugene of Savoy (1663–1736) famous general.
6. Princess Marie Jeanne of Savoy (1665–1705) Mademoiselle de Soissons.
7. Princess Louise Philiberte of Savoy (1667–1726) Mademoiselle de Dreux.
8. Princess Françoise of Savoy (1668–1671).

== In fiction ==
She is portrayed in a novel by Judith Merkle Riley: The Oracle Glass (1994).

== Sources ==
- Thérèse Louis Latour "Princesses, Ladies and Adventuresses of The Reign of Louis XIV", Published by Alfred A. Knopf, 1924

Court offices
Preceded by Anne Gonzaga	Surintendante de la Maison de la Reine to the Queen of France; 1661–1679	Succeeded by Madame de Montespan
