= Martinozzi =

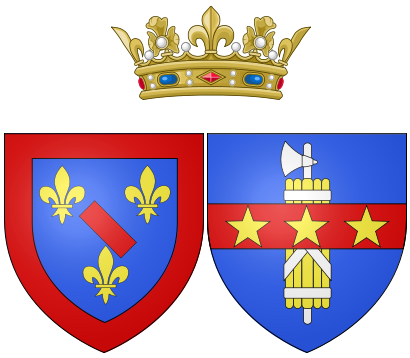
Arms of alliance of Anne Marie Martinozzi and her French husband, Armand de Bourbon, Prince of Conti (1654)

The Martinozzi family is an old Italian noble family, known since the 13th century, whose members were best known throughout history as blood-relations to the Cardinal Mazarin.

== History ==
Family origins were from Fano, later settled in Montepulciano. Members of the family held many important posts in the government of Siena and in 1430 obtained the hereditary title of Count in the Kingdom of Naples. Many of the Martinozzi's chose a military career. Their service was recognized in 1753 when they were inscribed in the Golden Book of the Sienese Patricians. After the fall of Siena, the family passed into the service of the House of Medici. Bonaventura Martinozzi, a Cassinense monk, who was a distinguished theologian, law reader in the Sienese study and pro-Vicar General in the Archdiocese in 1775, was appointed mayor of Ferrara by Duke Ercole I d'Este he had him very dear and appointed him as his Secret Advisor at the end of the 16th century. Due to blood relation of Cardinal Mazarin, his Matinozzi nieces, along with his nieces from the Mancini family, were called the Mazarinettes and moved to the Kingdom of France to make advantageous with the most notable French and Italian aristocracy.

== Notable members of the family ==
- Anne Marie Martinozzi (1637–1672), Italian noble
- Marie-Anne Martinozzi, Duchess of Bouillon, Italian-French aristocrat
- Laura Martinozzi (1639–1687), Italian noble, sister of Anne Marie

== See also ==
- Martinuzzi (disambiguation)
