= Martinuzzi =

Martinuzzi may refer to:

- Martinuzzi Castle, a medieval castle in Vințu de Jos, in the Transylvania region of Romania
- Fernando Martinuzzi (born 1980), Argentinian/Italian soccer player
- George Martinuzzi (1482–1551), Croatian nobleman, Pauline monk and Hungarian statesman

== See also ==
- Martinozzi
