= Mazzarini =

Coat of arms of the Mazzarini family

The Mazzarini family is an ancient Italian noble family, whose most famous member of Cardinal Mazarin. Combining the name of their cousins from the Mancini family with theirs, members of the family bore the title of Prince of the Holy Roman Empire, thus becoming Princes Mancini-Mazarini. Members of the family married into the highest Italian and French nobility, while nieces of the Cardinal were called the Mazarinettes and played political role in the history of the Kingdom of France. Mazzarini is also an Italian surname, derived from the Latin personal name "Maccarius", which means "blessed".

== Notable people ==
- Girolama Mazzarini (died 1656), Italian courtier
- Giulio Mazzarini, Italian photographer
- Laura Margherita Mazzarini (1608–1685), Italian courtier
- Pietro Mazzarini (1576–1634), Italian courtier
- Andrea Mazzarani Italian professional footballer
