= Prince Louis Julius of Savoy =

Italian soldier (1660-1683)

Prince Louis Julius of Savoy (2 May 1660 – 13 July 1683) was an Italian soldier and the brother of the famous Savoyard leader Prince Eugene of Savoy who distinguished himself as a general in the service of the Imperial Army of the Holy Roman Empire.

== Biography ==
Louis Julius was born in Toulouse on 2 May 1660 to Count Eugene Maurice of Soissons and the noblewoman Olympia Mancini.

From a young age he was trained for a military career. In 1672, Louis Julius' uncle, Emmanuel Philibert, Prince of Carignano invited him to Piedmont to serve the Duchy of Savoy. In 1678, Duke Victor Amadeus II of Savoy appointed him Lieutenant General of the province of Saluzzo.

In 1682, he was entrusted with the command of a regiment of Dragoons, and the following year, following the advance of the massive Ottoman Armies, he joined the service of the army of the Holy Roman Empire. Louis Julius was injured due to a fall from his horse in one of the first clashes provoked by the Turks to conquer Vienna, two months before the famous Battle of Vienna. He died after a few days of agony on 13 July 1683 in Petronell, near the Habsburg capital, at just 23 years old. For his great valor he was nicknamed "Knight of Savoy". Shortly after his death, his brother Prince Eugene of Savoy also enlisted in the Imperial armies and participated in the Battle of Vienna, in which the Turks were defeated.
