= Peace of Rueil =

1649 agreement which ended the first conflicts of the Fronde (period of French civil war)

The Peace of Rueil (French: Paix de Rueil, IPA: [pɛ də ʁɥœj] or [ʁɥɛj]), signed 11 March 1649, signalled an end to the opening episodes of the Fronde (a period of civil war in the Kingdom of France) after little blood had been shed. The articles ended all hostilities and declared all avenues of trade reopened. The settlement was promulgated in the name of the child king Louis XIV through his mother Anne of Austria, the Queen Regent. Cardinal Mazarin, the true power of the court party, was not mentioned in the text, though he was a signatory, as was the Grand Condé, who had been recruited by the court party to overcome the resistance of Paris.

== Negotiations and terms ==
The Parlement of Paris was directed to report to Saint Germain-en-Laye, where the king proposed to hold a lit de justice solely to proclaim the agreed-upon articles. The Parlement was then to return to Paris and carry on as usual, but it was agreed that no further sessions of the Chambre Saint-Louis would be held during the year. The Declarations of the Parlement of July and October 1648, which a historian might consider the opening paper volley of the Fronde, were confirmed, but all general edicts of the Parlement enacted since 6 January were declared null and void. The King, "desiring to give evidence of his affection to the inhabitants of his good City of Paris," declared that he was resolved to return to the capital.

The lettres de cachet issued in the King's name were likewise nullified. The war of words was thereby retracted on both sides. Troops raised by the Parlement were to be disbanded and the King's troops were to be returned to their customary garrisons. The Bastille and the Paris Arsenal, which had been seized by the forces of the Parlement, were to be returned to royal control. As for the envoy from the archduke Leopold, Philip IV’s representative in the Spanish Netherlands, who was offering Habsburg aid, poised to invade northern France as a result of negotiations on the part of the prince de Conti, he was to be sent away from Paris without a response from the Parlement.

Conti, a prince of the blood who was at the head of the noble faction that still claimed to represent the Parlement de Paris, was pardoned, as well as all those others who had taken part. All were to be free of prosecution for their roles, if they would declare for the settlement within four days. A general pardon was issued for all cash taken or property sold during the insurrection.

Turning to the pressing royal need for money, which was at the root of the imposed taxes that had been resisted by the Parlement, it was agreed that the King might borrow sums deemed necessary at denier 12 (8.33%) interest for the current and following years only.

== Results ==
The Parlement of Paris quickly ratified the treaty. Peace lasted until the end of 1649. The princes returned to court, renewing their intrigues against Mazarin and gaining the support of the Grand Condé. Mazarin, having privately established the support of the party of Gaston, Duke of Orléans, the king's uncle, and with Jean François Paul de Gondi, cardinal de Retz and the duchesse de Chevreuse behind him, suddenly arrested Condé, his brother the prince de Conti and their brother-in-law the duc de Longueville, on January 14, 1650, precipitating the next phase of the Fronde, the Fronde des nobles.

== See also ==
- List of treaties
