= Camillo Marcolini =

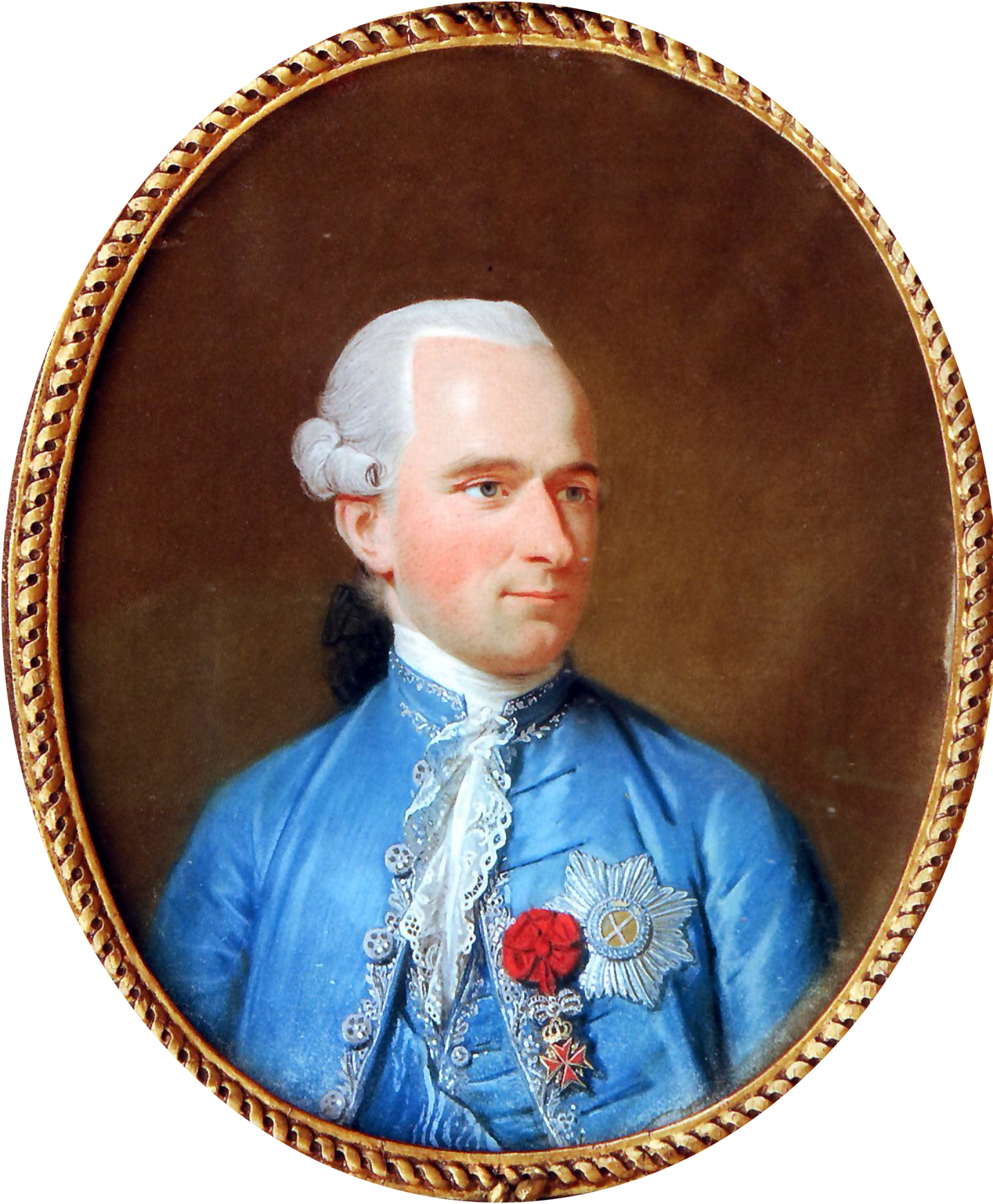
Portrait of Camillo Count Marcolini-Ferretti by Johann Heinrich Schmidt

The Ensigna of Count Camillo Marcolini-Ferretti

Camillo Count Marcolini-Ferretti (2 April 1739 in Fano – 10 July 1814 in Prague) was a minister and general director of the fine arts for the Electorate, later Kingdom of Saxony.

== Biography ==
Born into the Marcolini family, an old Italian nobility, Camillo was the son of Pietro Paolo Marcolini (1689–1758), Doctor of Theology and Philosophy in the service of Pope Clement XI, and his wife, Antonia Ferretti. The prince-elector Frederick Christian met the Camillo's father in Rome and they agreed that in 1752 Camillo would be sent as page to the Saxon court. In Saxony, Camillo gained the prince-electors and future Frederick Augustus I of Saxony's trust. In 1767 Camillo became Lord Chamberlain, 1778 Lord Controller, 1799 Lord equerry, 1772 Privy Councillor and 1809 minister of the royal cabinet. In 1813, after the Battle of Leipzig, Marcolini followed the King into exile.

== Notable achievements ==
Camillo also became general director of the fine arts in 1780 later the director of the art academy, as well as director of the Meissen porcelain manufacture from 1774 to 1813. Some Meissen services from this time are known as 'Marcolini Services' after him.

Camillo founded the zoological garden and horse breeding in Annaburg in 1792.

== Personal life ==
On 4 May 1778 Marcolini married Baroness Anna O'Kelly. They had issue, including:

- Peter Paul Emanuel Johannes Count Marcolini-Ferretti (b. 1785), married firstly in 1807 to Countess Maria Anna Antonia Cavriani (b. 1792) and had one daughter. He married secondly Joséphine Rousseau d'Happancourt (1820–1899) and had one daughter:
  - Countess Theresia Ludovica Marcolili-Ferretti (1808–1875), married to Count Carl Johann Heinrich von Nimptsch (1803–1869) and had issue
  - Countess Marianne Marcolini-Ferretti (d. 1864), married to Prince Philipp Karl Alexander of Liechtenstein and had issue.

== Death ==
He died in 1814 in his exile in Prague, at the age of 75.

== Insignia ==
Camillo's insignia from 1775 and 1814 was the crossed swords with a star.
