= Charlotte Marguerite de Montmorency =

- Princess de Condé
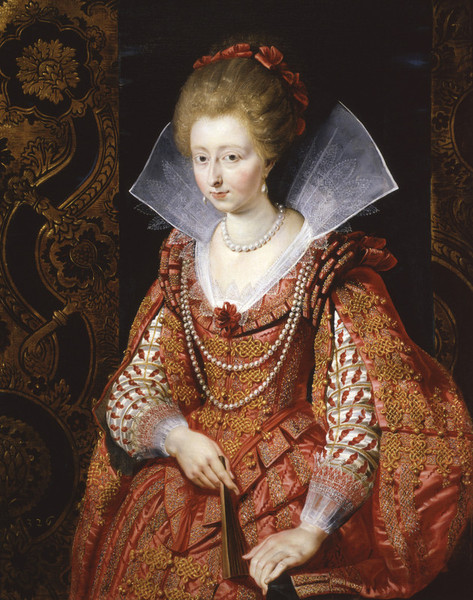
- Portrait by Peter Paul Rubens, c. 1610
- Born: 11 May 1594; Pézenas, Languedoc, France
- Died: 2 December 1650 (aged 56); Châtillon-sur-Loire
- Spouse: Henri, Prince de Condé
- Issue: Anne Geneviève, Duchess de Longueville; Louis, Prince de Condé; Armand, Prince de Conti
Names
- Charlotte Marguerite de Montmorency
- House: Montmorency
- Father: Henri de Montmorency, Duke of Montmorency
- Mother: Louise de Budos
- Religion: Roman Catholicism

Charlotte Marguerite de Montmorency, Princess of Condé (11 May 1594 – 2 December 1650) was an heiress of one of France's leading ducal families, and Princess de Condé by her marriage to Henri de Bourbon. She almost became a mistress of Henry IV of France, but her husband escaped with her after the wedding and did not return to France until after King Henry's death.

== Biography ==
Portrait by Claude Deruet

The daughter of Henri de Montmorency and his second wife, Louise de Budos, Charlotte lost her mother before she was five years of age. She was brought up under the care of her aunt Diane de France, Duchess of Angoulême.

In 1609, fifteen-year-old Charlotte-Marguerite wed the Prince of Condé in a glittering ceremony.

The king had arranged Charlotte-Marguerite's marriage to Condé for his own convenience, in order to sleep with her himself when he pleased. To escape from this predicament, the couple fled to Brussels. The king was enraged and threatened to march into Flanders with an army unless the Habsburg governors returned Condé and Charlotte-Marguerite at once. At the time, he was also threatening war with the Habsburgs over the succession to the United Duchies of Jülich-Cleves-Berg, so historians are unsure how crucial in itself Charlotte-Marguerite's return was as a reason for war. Condé continued to provoke Henry from Flanders. When asked to drink to the queen of France, he replied that there seemed to be more than one queen of France, maybe as many as four or five.

Along with many other French nobles, her husband bitterly opposed the rule of Marshal d'Ancre, who abandoned the policy of the late King Henry IV. In September 1616, Condé and Charlotte-Marguerite were arrested and imprisoned at Vincennes, where their daughter Anne Geneviève was conceived and born three years later, in 1619.

In 1632, Charlotte-Marguerite's only brother, Henri, Duke de Montmorency was executed for intriguing against Cardinal Richelieu. The title passed to her. She was buried at the Carmel du faubourg Saint-Jacques, a Carmelite convent in Paris.

== Children ==
Arms as Princess de Condé

Her children with the Prince de Condé were:

1. Anne Genevieve (1619-1679); married Henri d'Orléans, Duke de Longueville.
2. Louis, Prince of Condé, "le Grand Condé" (1621-1686); married Claire-Clémence de Maillé-Brézé.
3. Armand de Bourbon, Prince of Conti (1629-1666); married Anne Marie Martinozzi.

== Ancestry ==
Ancestors of Charlotte Marguerite de Montmorency

8. Guillaume, Baron of Montmorency
4. Anne, Duke of Montmorency
9. Anne Pot, Lady of Thorey
2. Henri I, Duke of Montmorency
10. René, Count of Villars
5. Madeleine of Savoy
11. Anne Lascaris, Heiress of Tende
1. Charlotte Marguerite de Montmorency
12. Jean, Baron of Budos
6. Jacques de Budos, Viscount of Portes
13. Louise de Porcelet
3. Louise de Budos, Lady of Vachères
14. Claude de Clermont, Baron of Montoison
7. Catherine de Clermont-Montoison
15. Louise de Rouvroy de Saint-Simon

== See also ==
- Princess of Condé

Charlotte Marguerite de Montmorency House of Montmorency Born: 11 May 1594 Died: 2 December 1650
Preceded by Henri II	Duchesse de Montmorency; 1632-1650	Succeeded by Louis, le Grand Condé
