= Baldassarre Lanci =

Italian architect, inventor and set designer

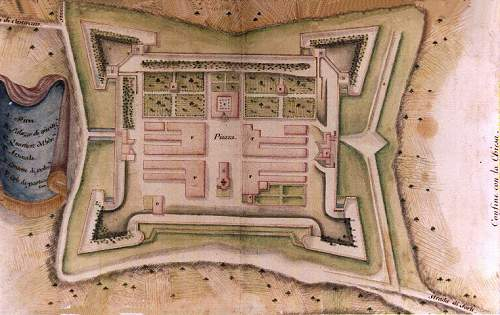
A plan of Lanci's new city at Terra del Sole. Its geometric layout was to prove an early example of modern town planning, later popularised during the Baroque period

Baldassarre Lanci (1510–1571) was an Italian architect, inventor, theatrical set designer, and master of perspective of the Renaissance period. Born in Urbino, he spent most of his working life in Tuscany.

== Early career ==
Baldassarre Lanci began his career as military engineer, for ten years following 1547 he was in the continual employment of the Republic of Lucca. His notability as a construction engineer earned him the commission to carry out a detailed survey of Rome's city walls and those of the bastions at Ancona, Civitavecchia and Ostia, and for Pope Pius IV

== Medici architect ==
From 1557 he worked almost exclusively for Cosimo I de' Medici, Lanci's chief employer and patron for whom he supervised such projects as the fortification of Siena and many other Tuscan towns. His urban works included the design of Terra del Sole a fortified new city for Cosimo I de' Medici, in what is now the Province of Forlì-Cesena. Lanci also designed the church of Santa Maria della Rosa in the spa town of Chianciano Terme, in today's Province of Siena; Santa Maria della Rosa was built on a central plan; even though it was not finished, the church is notable for the sobriety, and clean lines of its design which culminates in an elegant dome. The church, however, was never fully completed. In 1585 building work stopped, fourteen years after Lanci's death. He also designed the walls of Grosseto in 1564, directing the construction site until his death in 1571, when he was succeeded by his son Marino.

Lanci's most notable achievement was his invention in 1567 of a piece of surveying equipment to obtain perspectives with a visual field of 180°. The instrument, which he named distanziometro ("distance meter"), was made of a circular bronze plate placed upon a horizontal tripod the height of which could be adjusted. Semi-cylindrical paper was wound around its edge. A cylindrical eyepiece was placed in the centre with a retracting metal needle or pen underneath. The eyepiece was high enough to overlook the semicircle of paper and sight points of interest while the retracting needle scored on the paper to accurately plot the subject. It could also be used as a quadrant for measuring height in much the same way as the orizzonte designed by Leon Battista Alberti.

His diverse works also included many aquatic projects such as the improvement of Livorno harbour (1566-1567), and the Sovana aqueduct, earning him fame as an early hydraulic engineer.

== Engineer ==
As an architect his engineering skills were firmly to the forefront, rather than an interpretation on the finer and more sophisticated points of rinascimento architecture. Impregnable fortresses such as the Fortezza Medicea at Siena, and bastide towns, and bridges are his trade mark rather than elegant palazzi. This is not to say Lanci was a man lacking in sophistication, one of his more surprising talents was designing some of the sets for the lavish theatrical and dramatical performances for which the Medici court was famed. As with his architecture, though, it was his engineering skills even here which dominated.

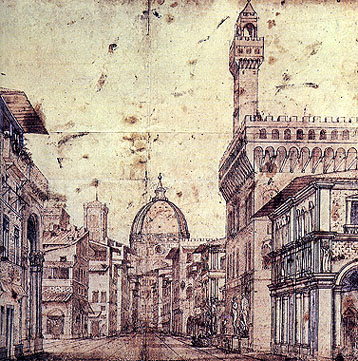
Drawing by Lanzi of a perspective view of Florence (Palazzo Vecchio and Brunelleschi's dome of Santa Maria del Fiore) The precise perspective was obtained using the surveying equipment he invented himself. The image itself suggests Lanci's secondary career as a set designer.

Long before the Restoration spectaculars of the 17th century Lanci was designing elaborate and complicated theatre sets, using pivoted scenery, with up to three different scenes painted on boards, thus allowing the mood of the production to be altered in an instant. One of the earliest examples of this form of scenic change was recorded in 1568 for a performance of the Fabii produced to celebrate the baptism of a daughter of Francesco de' Medici. One of Lanci's most extravagant productions was for a performance of Giovan Battista Cini's La Vedova (The Widow), staged in Florence in 1569, with amazingly extravagant costumes by Bernardo Buontalenti, the event was recorded by the mathematician Ignazio Danti who was so impressed by Lanci's theatrical engineering he included a drawing of his periaktoi stage. The periaktoi stage setting was basically a series of three sided revolving triangular boards each side with a different scene. Each triangular board was connected, hence there would be one or two flanking the stage, in the wings, and a further section suspended between them on which would be painted skies, cloudy, sunny, dawn or dusk. The entire series of revolving boards were linked to each other by a series of pulleys and machinery, thus allowing scene changes to be almost instantaneous. While Lanci did not invent this mechanism himself (indeed Vitruvius had described these three-sided units revolving in the Roman era) he was instrumental in its further development. Often producing and relocating the settings of the plays, himself, in order that a greater variety of scenery could be included. What in fact Lanci realised and promoted was that a false perspective coupled with a deliberately created illusionary architectural area, was the perfect dramatical setting.
