= Giovan Battista Cini =

- Born: 30 June 1528; Pisa, Republic of Florence
- Died: October 1586 (aged 57–58); Florence, Grand Duchy of Tuscany
- Resting place: Ognissanti
- Occupation: Playwright

Giovan Battista Cini (c. 1525 – c. 1586) was an Italian Renaissance playwright at the court of the Medici in Florence.

== History ==
Cini was a member of The Florentine Academy of Art which was founded by Grand Duke Cosimo I at the height of the Medici power during the 16th century. Cini's contemporaries there were his fellow authors d'Ambra, Lasca (author of the renowned Story of Dr Manente), Cecchi and Gelli. They studied the intellectual philosophies from Plautus and Terence to Ariosto and Machiavelli.

=== Theater work ===
At the time Florence led Europe as a theatrical center. By the 15th century the city was renowned for its "sacre rappresentazioni": these were religious dramas incorporating stage machinery. However what was an important step to what was to become modern theater was the Florentine love of staging classical comedies, unlike the rest of intellectual Europe which merely read them. The first instance of a Florentine classical production was as early as 1476 when Terence's Andria was performed translated into Latin so that it could be clearly understood by a wider audience. The next step came in the late 16th century came when musical interludes were incorporated into the text and spoken dialogue—this was the birth of modern opera.

One of these early "operas" was Cini's principal work which drew on the fables of Cupid and Psyche. This work, which Cini dedicated "to the future of Grand Duchy of Florence"' was performed accompanied by music composed by Alessandro Striggio. Striggio (1535–1589) was the principal composer to the Florentine Medici court.

Another of his works, La Vedova ("The Widow"), received a famous theatrical set designed by the Medici's architect Baldassarre Lanci – complete with mechanical revolving scenery. Lanci actually changed the location of the play in order to include more scene changes than Cini had written.

==== Performances ====
These elaborate and complicated performances were generally staged to honor weddings and baptisms of the Medici family, or to greet the arrival of foreign princes and potentates in Florence.

During Cini's time, performances were generally held in the courtyard of a palazzo where often grandstands would be erected. The courtyard would be tented by cloth on which was painted a sky. The Palazzo Pitti (which the Medici had purchased from Luca Pitti in 1549) had an amphitheatre constructed in its Boboli Gardens for such performances. At one performance it was recorded that seventy candelabra bearing putti were suspended from the "sky" providing light, while the performers entered the theatrical arena on ornamental floats against a background showing Venice. Venice and the Sahara were a popular locations for Florentine plays, and in choosing these locations Cini was no exception.
