= Eugene Maurice, Count of Soissons =

Eugene Maurice of Savoy-Carignano
- Count of Soissons and of Dreux
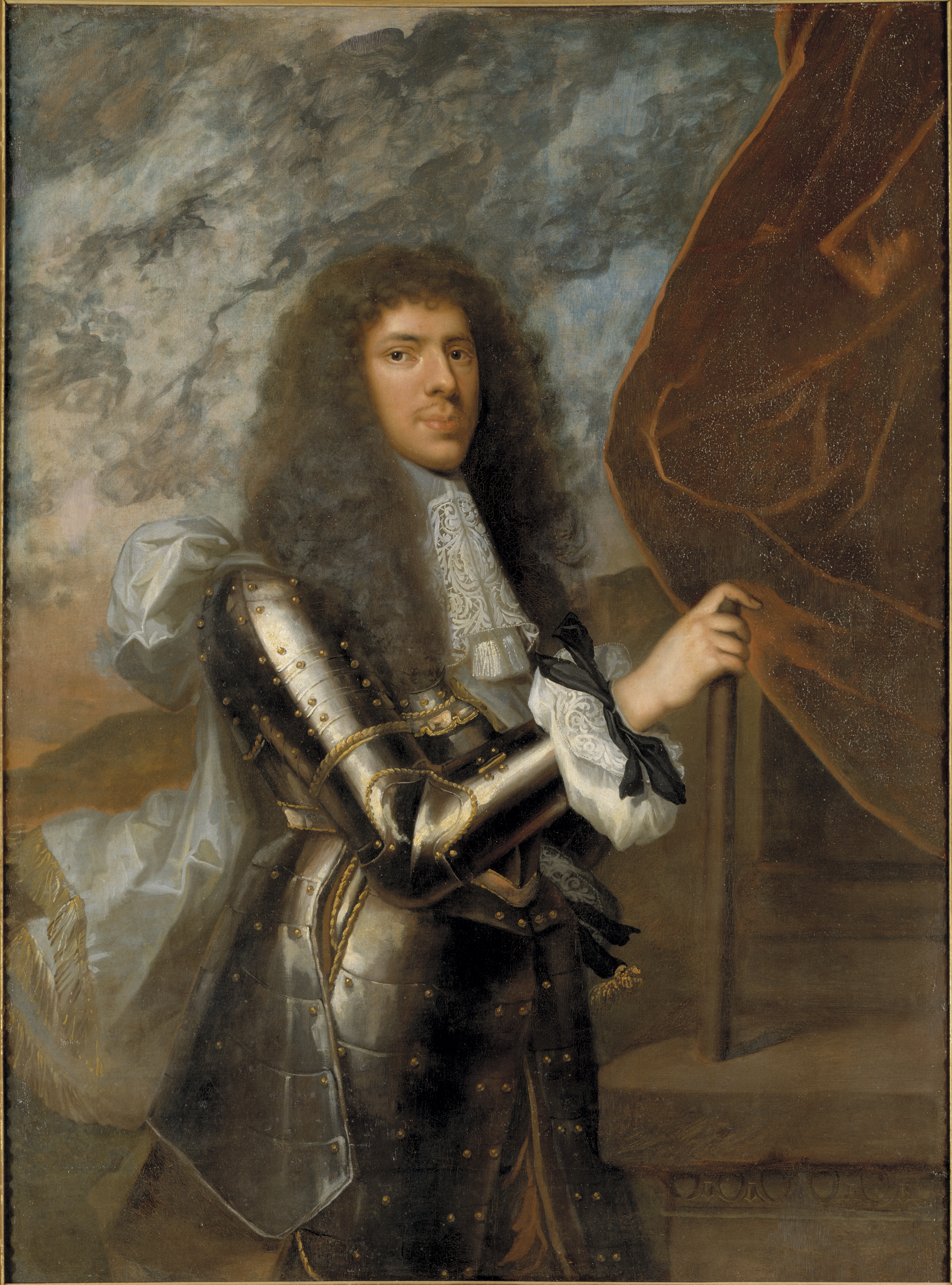

Count of Soissons
- Tenure: 1656–1673
- Predecessor: Joseph Emmanuel
- Successor: Louis Thomas
- Born: 2 March 1635; Chambéry, Duchy of Savoy
- Died: 6 June 1673 (aged 38); Unna, Westphalia
- Spouse: Olimpia Mancini (m. 1657)
- Issue: Louis Thomas, Count of Soissons; Prince Philippe of Savoy; Prince Louis Julius of Savoy; Emmanuel Philibert, Count of Dreux; Prince Eugene; Marie Jeanne, Mademoiselle de Soissons; Louise Philiberte, Mademoiselle de Dreux; Françoise, Mademoiselle de Dreux
Names
- Eugenio Maurizio di Savoia
- House: Savoy-Carignano
- Father: Thomas Francis, Prince of Carignano
- Mother: Marie de Bourbon

Prince Eugene Maurice of Savoy-Carignano (French: Eugène Maurice de Savoie-Carignan, Italian: Eugenio Maurizio di Savoia-Soissons; 2 March 1635 – 6 June 1673) was a Franco-Italian nobleman, general, and member of the House of Savoy-Carignano. He held the title of Count of Soissons and was the father of Imperial field marshal Prince Eugene of Savoy.

== Biography ==
Eugene Maurice was born in Chambéry, Savoy. He was son of Thomas Francis, Prince of Carignano and Marie de Bourbon, Countess of Soissons. He was grandson of Charles Emmanuel I, Duke of Savoy and Catalina Micaela of Spain.

On 21 February 1657 he married the "beautiful and witty" Olimpia Mancini, a niece of cardinal Mazarin, daughter of Michele Mancini and Geronima Mazarini.

He obtained high military posts through his wife's influence. He played a role in defeating the Spaniards at the battle of the Dunes in 1658. He took part in the campaigns at Flanders (1667), Franche-Comté (1668) and Holland (1672); and was present as ambassador extraordinary of France at the coronation of Charles II of England.

He died at Unna in Westphalia in 1673, out of a deadly fever, although there were voices that he had been poisoned.

== Family ==
Eugene and Olympia had:

- Louis Thomas, Count of Soissons (1657–1702) married Uranie de La Cropte de Beauvais (1655–1717) and had issue.
- Philippe, "Abbot of Soissons" (3 September 1659 – 2 November 1693)
- Louis Julius, Cavaliere of Savoy (1660–1683) killed at the battle of Petronell against the Turks known as the Cavaliere di Savoia.
- Emanuel Philibert, Count of Dreux (20 August 1662 – 19 August 1676) unmarried and without issue.
- Prince Eugene of Savoy (1663–1736), famous general.
- Princess Marie Jeanne of Savoy, Mademoiselle de Soissons (11 April 1665 – 3 November 1705) died unmarried.
- Princess Louise Philiberte of Savoy, Mademoiselle de Dreux (26 September 1667 – 21 December 1726) died unmarried.
- Princess Françoise of Savoy (21 September 1668 – 4 October 1671) died young.

== Sources ==
- Herre, Franz (2001). Eugenio di Savoia (in Italian). Garzanti. ISBN 88-11-69311-X.
- Le Tellier, François-Michel (2007). Salat, Nicole; Sarmant, Thierry (eds.). Lettres de Louvois à Louis XIV, 1679-1691 : politique, guerre et fortification au grand siècle (in French). Société de l'histoire de France. ISBN 978-2354071042.
- Miskei, Antal (2017). "Savoyai Eugén és kastélya a Csepel-szigeten" (PDF). Acta Academiae Agriensis. Sectio Historiae (in Hungarian). 44. Eszterházy Károly Egyetem: 179–197.
- Ward, A.W.; Prothero, G.W.; Leathes, Stanley, eds. (1911). The Cambridge Modern History. Vol. XIII. Cambridge at the University Press.

Attribution:
