= Armand de Bourbon, Prince of Conti =

French nobleman

Armand de Bourbon
- Prince of Conti
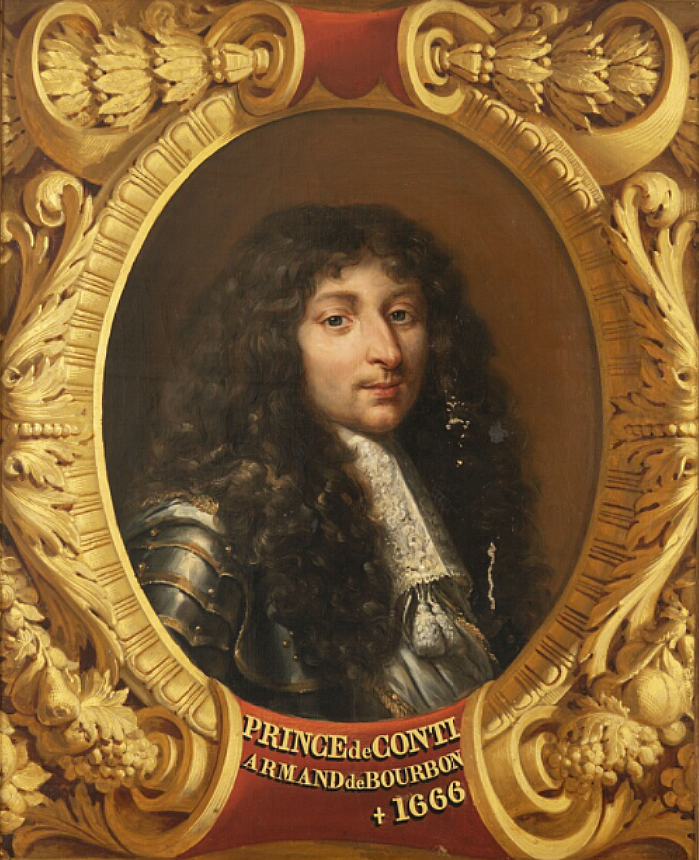

Prince of Conti
- Reign: 11 October 1629 – 26 February 1666
- Predecessor: François de Bourbon, Prince of Conti
- Successor: Louis Armand I, Prince of Conti
- Born: 11 October 1629; Paris, France
- Died: 26 February 1666 (aged 36); Pézenas, Languedoc, France
- Spouse: Anne Marie Martinozzi
- Issue: Louis Armand I, Prince of Conti; François Louis, Prince of Conti
- House: Bourbon-Conti
- Father: Henri II, Prince of Condé
- Mother: Charlotte Marguerite de Montmorency

Armand de Bourbon, Prince of Conti (11 October 1629 – 26 February 1666), was a French nobleman, the younger son of Henri II, Prince of Condé and Charlotte Marguerite de Montmorency, daughter of Henri I, Duke of Montmorency. He was the brother of le Grand Condé and Anne Geneviève, Duchess of Longueville. As a member of the reigning House of Bourbon, he was a Prince du Sang.

== Life ==
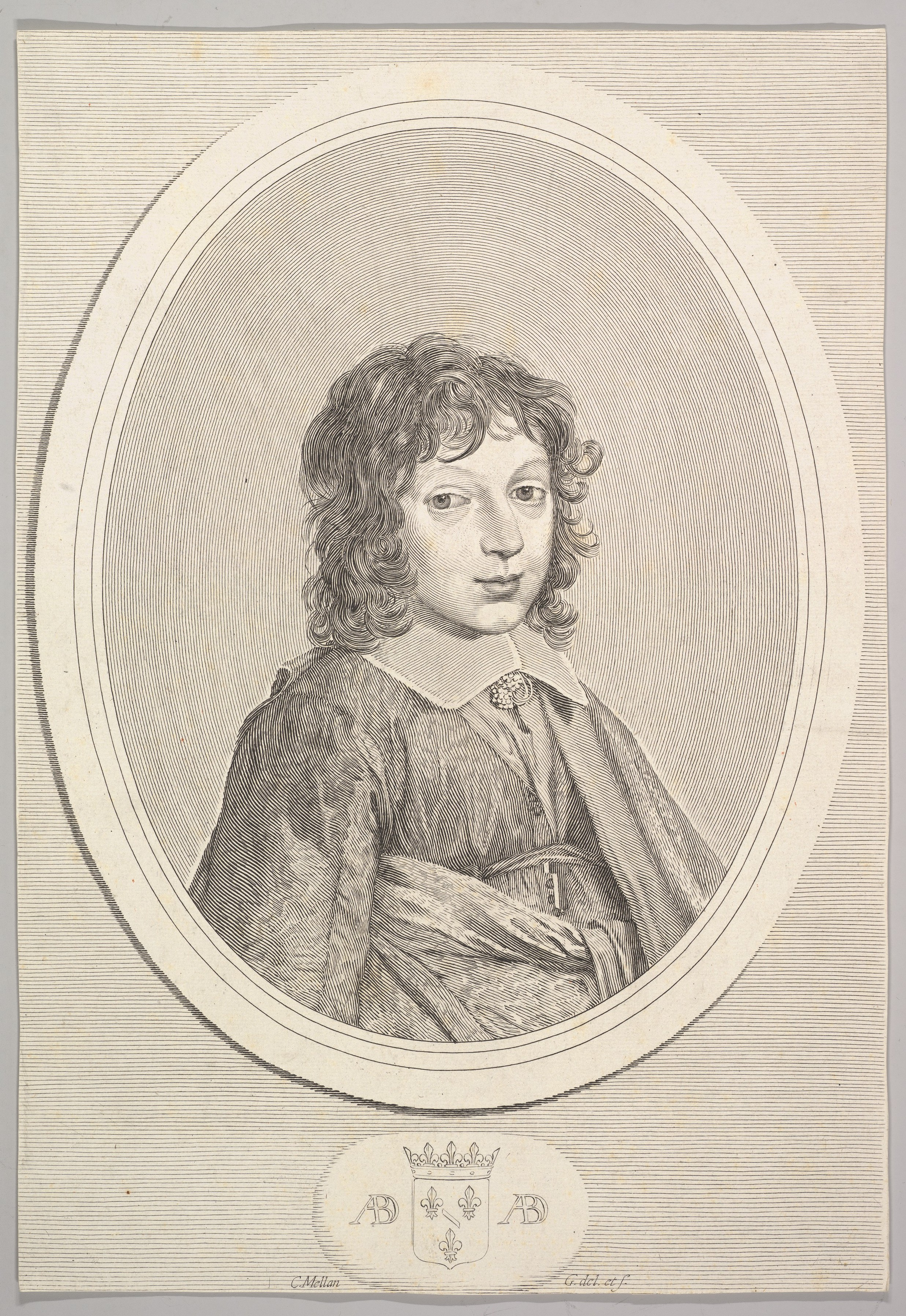
Engraving by Claude Mellan of Armand de Bourbon as a boy wearing a priest's cassock

Coat-of-arms for Armand, Prince of Conti

=== Early life ===
Armand de Bourbon was born October 11, 1629, in Paris. The title of Prince of Conti was revived in his favor at the time of his birth. With the title Armand also inherited the Château de L'Isle-Adam and its estate, which had been passed down to his mother Charlotte Marguerite after the death of her brother, Henri II de Montmorency whom had been executed due to Cardinal Richelieu´s intrigues.

Conti's god-father was the Cardinal Richelieu whom he was also named Armand after. His godmother was his aunt by marriage Marie-Félicie des Ursins, Duchess of Montmorency.

Conti´s paternal grandfather Henri I de Condé had been a leader of the Calvinist Huguenots and his paternal grandmother Charlotte Catherine de La Trémoille was descended from two of France's oldest and most powerful families. His maternal grandfather was Henri de Montmorency, Duke of Montmorency and Louise de Budos.

Conti´s parents marriage had been arranged partly to neutralize his father as a potential leader of the Huguenots to rally around, and partly because the king, Henry IV wished to make Charlotte-Marguerite his mistress- and believing his young relative would remain complaisant enough to allow this. Instead Henri had fled together with his wife to Brussels and did not return until after the death of Henry IV in 1610.

Conti's mother, Charlotte Marguerite was known for her beauty and refinement, while his father Henri was small and thin, intelligent but with a temper and with a reputation as zealous Catholic who much preferred hunting and the military life to being at court.

Of the six children born to the couple only three would survive to adulthood.

In 1632, the Duke of Montmorency, the Condé children's uncle, was accused of conspiring against the king. Their mother Charlotte-Marguerite went to plead with the king for her brothers life and to assure them of his loyalty. Distraught she even offered her sons, the Duke of Enghien and the Prince of Conti as a guarantee of her words- but to no avail. Montmorency was executed.

==== Education ====
Due to a slight deformity of his back and having a weak constitution he was destined for a clerical career and studied theology at the university of Bourges, where he was educated by Étienne - Agard de Champs. He had his own household Hotel de Limoges

But although he received several benefices, including the abbeys of Cluny, Saint Denis,Lerins and Molesme, he did not take orders.

Conti would later study at the Collège de Clermont, a Jesuit institution. On 6 August 1643, he obtained his diploma as master of arts and, in 1646, that of bachelor in theology from the University of Bourges.

On the death of his father in 1646 when he was seventeen, he inherited the governorship of Champagne and Brie, and during the same year, he was subject to the decision of a family council which decided to keep him with the Jesuits for another year, to his great displeasure.

Conti was considered intelligent but was described as "a cypher" by a contemporary. and vacillated between debauched behavior and religious fervor.

===== Literary interests =====
It has been claimed that Conti had been a fellow student of Molière's at Clermont but as Conti started attending the school in 1637 by which time Molière had already left the school its more truthful to say they were alumni of the same school. Conti was however a patron of Moliere and La Fontaine. He even he secured an introduction to the court of King Louis XIV for Moliére.

Conti and his sister, the duchess de Longueville attended the literary salon of Catherine de Vivonne, marquise de Rambouillet at the Hôtel de Rambouillet.

Conti was involved in a literary dispute over the sonnet Job (1651) by the poet Benserade. The sonnet, which Benserade sent to a young lady with his paraphrase on the book of Job, was compared with the Urania of Voiture and led to a dispute on their relative merits that divided the whole court into two parties, named the Jobelins and the Uranists.

Those in favour of Benserade were headed by Conti and Mlle de Scudéry, while his sister, the Duchess de Longueville, along with Mme de Montausier and Jean-Louis Guez de Balzac took the side of Voiture.

Conti also employed the writer Jean François Sarrazin as his secretary in 1648. Biographers of Sarrazin would later claim that Conti had killed Sarrazin.

I owe to the memory of Sarrazin the clarification of a false rumor whose impression has remained in the minds of most people. It was said that when he refused to lend money to the Prince de Conti, the prince gave him such a blow with a fire shovel on the head that he died some time later. This prince was incapable of such anger, even towards the least of his servants

==== Love affairs ====
Conti kept a mistress Madame de Calvimont of Bordeaux who was "as silly as she was handsome". Ending their relationship with her he entered instead into an affair with a Mme de Calvière^{1} of Montpellier who was a relative of the mistress of one of the noblemen in Conti's entourage, Comte. d'Aubijoux.^{2} It was said that d'Aubijoux also was the cause of Conti contracting syphilis during his visit to Montpellier in the autumn of 1653.

"after leaving the table, M. d'Aubijoux, heated by the fumes of the wine, sent for one of those women whose caresses are venal. It was there that M. le prince de Conti caught this horrible illness which, for having been cured too much, was not cured at all.

— Gabriel Jules Daniel de Cosnac, Memoires de Daniel de Cosnac, p. 137

Conti also found Madame de Sevigne "very amiable".

== Involvement in the Fronde ==
=== First Fronde ===
Cardinal de Richelieu, chief minister of Louis XIII from 1624 to 1642, had many policies which weakened the influence of the nobility and reduced the powers of the judicial bodies, called Parlements. Opposition to the government among the nobility began to grow from 1643 under the “foreign” rule of the queen regent Anne of Austria (Louis XIV’s mother) and her chief minister, Cardinal Mazarin.

The refusal of the Parlement of Paris to approve the government’s revenue measures in the spring of 1648 was the catalyst for the first Fronde which was called, the Fronde of the Parlement. The frondeurs wanted to put a constitutional limit on the monarchy by establishing its power to discuss and modify royal decrees. The government at war with Spain felt pressured to accept the terms since they lacked sufficient power to fight as most of their army was occupied in Spain.

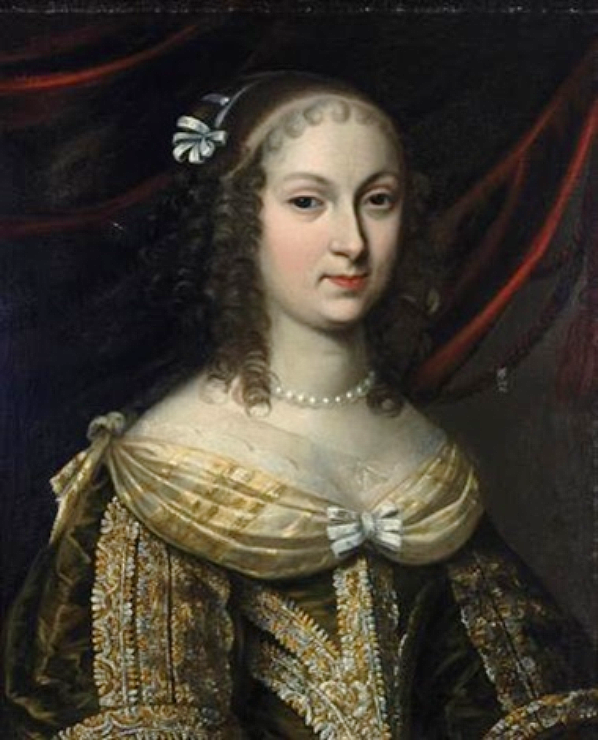
Anne-Genevieve de Bourbon, Duchess of Longueville by Circle of Charles Beaubrun

Conti´s sister Anne-Genevieve, Duchess de Longueville was the guiding spirit of the first Fronde, when she convinced the nineteen Conti of the just cause of the frondeurs and he subsequently played a conspicuous part in the intrigues and fighting of the Fronde. In 1648 he became the commander-in-chief of the rebel army, but by January 1649, Conti's brother Condé returned from Spain joined the cause of the government and besieged Paris.

The two warring parties signed the Peace of Rueil (11 March 1649) which granted amnesty to the rebels and confirmed the concessions to Parlement. Conti tried rallying the Parisians in asking for aid from Spain but they refused and with this the frondeurs had to lay down arms and submit to the government. The peace of Rueil lasted until the end of 1649.

=== Second Fronde ===
The princes, welcomed at court again, began to plot against Mazarin. Cardinal Mazarin, having come to an understanding with Monsieur Gondi and Madame de Chevreuse, had Conti, his brother Condé and brother-in-law (Longueville) arrested, on January 18, 1650, at the same time in a gallery of the Louvre Palace, where they had been lured under various pretexts. They were then taken to be imprisoned in the donjon at Vincennes. The person in charge of guarding them was captain Guy de Bar, who had been given a hundred men to guard them and was said to treat his prisoners very harshly.

They were then taken on Château de Marcoussis where they arrived 15 November 1650 and after this to Fort du Havre on 25 November.

==== Life in prison ====
Conti, his brother and their brother-in-law de Longuevilles imprisonment in the Chateau de Vincennes would be prove to be an ordeal for the young prince, and during the earlier days of captivity Conti would keep to his bed and cry.

Said to be "mystic" and "full of strange ideas", Conti turned slightly mad while in prison. (this might have been a symptom of the syphilis which would lead to his death) Having a secret passion for his sister the Duchess of Longueville, he invented tricks to make her notice him. He would later like her become a fervent Jansenist. He tried alchemy and potions for some time and eventually bruised himself with a spatula. This episode was ultimately fortunate for him because he could no longer be refused external help from physicians, some of whom would pass letters and pleas to the outside world which sped up his eventual release.

The sister of the brothers, the Duchess de Longueville, having fled to avoid capture turned to Turenne and begged him for aid and he resolved to rescue her brothers.

The Fronde of the Princes, the second Fronde began in early 1650 and was unlike the first Fronde which dealt with constitutional issues, instead it was opportunistically motivated the result was a web of intrigues, rivalries, and ever-shifting allegiances. One common factor among the aristocratic rebels was opposition to Mazarin and his influence over government. Conti´s brother Condé, disappointed in his hope for political power became rebellious.

Conti, his brother and brother-in-law were released early in February 1651, and by the spring the rebellion was over. Condé, and what was left of his army decided to enter the service of the king of Spain.

==== Third Fronde ====
Conti and the Comte de Marsin were left as the Condes representatives in Guyenne while Condé, reinforced by the troops of the Duke of Orleans, advanced on the royalist army at Bleneau.The Grand Condé was arrested after paying a visit to the Anne of Austria, and yet again confined at Vincennes, and then imprisoned at Nantes, from where he managed to escape. Condé forced into exile and sentenced to execution in his absence was not able to return to France until after the death of Cardinal Mazarin. Conti on the other took refuge in Bordeaux and he capitulated on 31 July 1653 and obtained permission to retire to Languedoc, to Pézenas in his castle of La Grange-des-Prés.

Released when Cardinal Mazarin went into exile, Conti wished to marry Charlotte-Marie de Lorraine (1627–1652), the second daughter of Madame de Chevreuse, the confidante of the queen, Anne of Austria (wife of King Louis XIII), but was prevented from doing so by his brother Condé, who was now supreme in the state.

== Marriage ==
Soon afterwards became reconciled with Cardinal Mazarin and as a cause of this Conti married Anne-Marie Martinozzi in 1654, the daughter of Girolamo Martinozzi and Laura Margherita Mazzarino. Anne Marie was one of the Mazarinettes, the many nieces of the powerful Cardinal Mazarin. The marriage took place at the Palais du Louvre 22 February 1654.

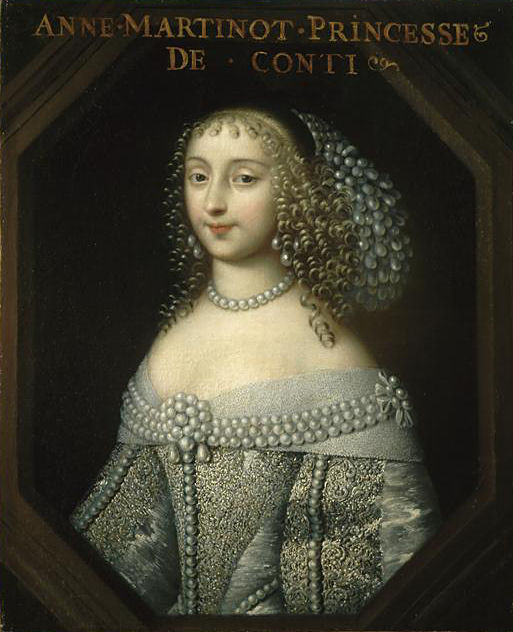
Anne Marie Martinozzi (1660-1670) by an anonymous painter

Anne-Marie was described as being possessed of a beautiful appearance, blonde hair, a sweet temper, generous, with a lot of wit and intelligence Although generally seen as gentle and modest, she sometimes had blunt manners that disconcerted and offended people.

Anne-Marie also brought a dowry of 200,000 ecus to the marriage and through this marriage Conti was given the government of Guyenne formerly governed by his brother. Because of this marriage to a relative of Mazarins Conti's relationship with his brother turned sour and he was despised by the Grand Condé who hated Mazarin and found his brother allied to his enemy a betrayal.

The couple made their home in a house on the quai Malaquais, which became known as the Hôtel de Conti.

The couple´s first child was born stillborn a year after their marriage, their second in 1656 was likewise a stillbirth. In 1658 a son that they named Louis, was born sickly and "covered in ulcers" and would only live for a few weeks.

They would go on to have two sons, Louis Armand and François Louis who would live to adulthood.

Conti took command of the army, which in 1654, invaded Spain through Catalonia, where he captured three towns from the Spanish during the Franco-Spanish War. He afterwards 1657 led the French forces in northern Italy, but after his defeat before Alessandria he would retire from the military life.

=== Religious conversion ===
Sometime around 1656, Conti ailing from what publicly was called a fever but most likely were syphilitic symptoms was visited by the Bishop of Aleth, Nicolas Pavillon. Pavillon was a zealous jansenist who effected Conti´s full conversion to Jansenism. Pavillon also advised Conti to acquire a spiritual guide and the person appointed by the bishop was Abbé Gabriel de Ciron. Ciron would be consulted by Conti on a regular basis, and would also serve as spiritual advisor for Conti´s wife and sister.

Conti joined the Compagnie du Saint-Sacrament [English:Company of the Blessed Sacrament], a religious society who swore its members to secrecy about the existence of the group and its inner workings.

Now completely devoted to Jansenism, Conti completely changed his way of living, by moderating his spending, cutting out all unnecessary luxuries in his household. The Prince of Conti also gave abundant alms to hospitals and the poor and gave considerable sums to churches and convents; he had even wanted to strip himself of all his property and his titles but was prevented by Pavillon to do so. Furthermore apart from when he was devoted to business, Conti occupied himself with reading religious literature, spiritual retreats, mortification and confessions to Abbé Ciron.

Ciron had such a great power over Conti that he went, on the orders of Ciron, to throw himself at the feet of M. de Calvimont, a counselor in the Bordeaux Parliament, whose wife Mme de Calvimont, Conti had seduced a few years earlier and beg his forgiveness.

Conti´s new religious fervor went to such extreme lengths as to forbidding the servants in his household from dancing, playing games and attending plays. He also expected his servants to attend three masses a day held in his private chapel. Those servants that he deemed lacking their worship he punished by ordering that they only be given bread and water for a few days.

In order to demonstrate how sincere his conversion was Conti who had been a patron of the theatre, decided write a treatise against the theatre entitled Traité de la comédie et des spectacles selon les traditions de l'Église (Paris, 1667), in which Conti turned against his old protégé Moliére, and charged the dramatist with keeping a school of atheism.

There are some actors here who used to bear my name; I have had them told to stop it and you can be sure that I have taken care not to go see them ...

— Armand de Bourbon, Prince de Conti, in

The writing of this work constantly occupied him during the last years of his life. Conti also wrote Lettres sur la grâce, and Du devoir des grands et des devoirs des gouverneurs de province.

=== Friendship with Pére Surin ===
Conti was personally acquainted with Jesuit preacher and mystic Jean-Joseph Surin, whose book Catéchisme spirituel (1656) he helped to publish. Surins cousin, Jean de Belhade, chevalier de Thodias had been a loyal supporter and military commander of the Grand Condé during The Fronde, and it is possible through this connection that Conti became acquainted with Surin.

Conti would also together with his sister attend clandestine meetings organized by Surins mother Jeanne de Seurin (née d’Arrerac). As these meetings occurred during the height of first Fronde, there has been speculation that it was not only religious matters discussed but that Surin was one of the conspirators. Surin's father had been a council member of the Bordeaux Parliament.

The two men would maintain a friendship until Surin's death.

== Later life ==
On 16 January 1660, Louis XIV granted him an annual pension of 60,000 livres and offered him the government of Languedoc, which had been left vacant by the death of Gaston d'Orléans, the king's uncle.

== Death ==
Conti died on 26 February 1666 at Pézenas at the Château de la Grange-des-Prés in Languedoc, France, likely from syphilis. Conti was buried at the Chartreuse du Val-de-Bénédiction in Villeneuve-lès-Avignon.

== Issue ==
Armand married Anne Marie Martinozzi, the daughter of Girolamo Martinozzi and Laura Margherita Mazzarini, elder sister of Cardinal Mazarin. They had the following children:

1. Stillborn child (1655)
2. Stillborn child (1656)
3. Louis de Bourbon (Hôtel de Conti, 6 September 1658 - Hôtel de Conti, 14 September 1658)
4. Louis Armand I, Prince of Conti (1661–1685), married Marie Anne de Bourbon, the eldest legitimised daughter of King Louis XIV and his mistress, Louise de La Vallière, and died childless.
5. François Louis, Prince of Conti (1664–1709), known as "le Grand Conti", married Marie Thérèse de Bourbon, daughter of Henri Jules, Prince of Condé (Armand's nephew), and had issue.

== Ancestry ==
Ancestors of Armand de Bourbon, Prince of Conti

8. Louis I, Prince of Condé
4. Henri I, Prince of Condé
9. Éléonore de Roye
2. Henri II, Prince of Condé
10. Louis III de La Trémoille, Duke of Thouars
5. Charlotte Catherine de La Trémoille
11. Jeanne de Montmorency
1. Armand, Prince of Conti
12. Anne, Duke of Montmorency
6. Henri I, Duke of Montmorency
13. Madeleine of Savoy
3. Charlotte Marguerite de Montmorency
14. Jacques de Budos, Viscount of Portes
7. Louise de Budos, Lady of Vachères
15. Catherine de Clermont-Montoison

== Notes ==
1.Marthe de Calviére (née de la Roche) was the daughter of the President of Chambres des comptes [English:Court of Auditors] and the wife of Antoine de Calvière, seigneur de Saint-Césaire-de-Gaussignan. In sources she is referred to as "Demoiselle Rochette"
2.François-Jacques d'Amboise, Comte d'Aubijoux, Baron de Castelnau, Governor of Montpellier

Armand de Bourbon, Prince of Conti House of Bourbon Born: 11 October 1629 Died: 26 February 1666
French royalty
Preceded by François de Bourbon	Prince de Conti; 1629–1666	Succeeded by Louis Armand
Catholic Church titles
Preceded by Cardinal Richelieu	Abbot of Cluny; 1642–1654	Succeeded by Cardinal Mazarin
