= Étienne Agard de Champs =

French Jesuit theologian and author

Étienne Agard de Champs (Dechamps; 2 September 1613 at Bourges – 31 July 1701 at Paris according to Augustin de Backer, at La Flèche) was a French Jesuit theologian and author.

== Life ==
He entered the Jesuit novitiate in 1630 and later became professor of rhetoric, philosophy, and theology in Paris. He was rector at Rennes, three times rector at Paris, head of the professed house, twice provincial of France, and once provincial of Lyon.

== Works ==
Jansenism, the major topic of debate in the France of his day, is the theme of all his books. Writing under the name of Richard Antonius, he composed "Defensio Censurae Sacrae Facultatis Parisiensis – seu Disputatio Theologica de libero arbitrio" (Paris, 1645). This was well received, and went through five editions in two years. It prompted a reply from Vincent Lenis in his "Theriaca" (Paris, 1648), which occasioned the "Antonii Ricardi Theologi Responsio ad objectiones Vincentianas" (Paris, 1648).

He defends the Sorbonne in his "De Haeresi Janseniana" (1654). Among his other works the best known is "Le secret du Jansenisme découvert et refute par un Docteur Catholique" (Paris, 1651).
