= Giulio Mazzarini =

Italian photographer and university professor

Giulio Mazzarini is a professional photographer and professor of photography, art direction and creative direction living in London, England.

== Early life and education ==
Giulio Mazzarini was born and grew up in Rome, Italy. After graduating in Sociology, he deepened the studies of Visual Communication and Photography, thanks also to one of his lecturers, the former Benetton photographer and Creative Director Oliviero Toscani. After graduation, he moved to London, where he studied Design and Photography at the famous Central St Martins College.

== Career ==
After working on the foundation of the Trend Forecasting website WGSN, in 1999 he began his career as an editorial and advertising photographer. His photography has been seen in international magazines such as Vanity Fair, Marie Claire, Elle, Style, Label, Drome, Dazed & Confused, Psychologies, Condé Nast Traveler, La Repubblica and has contributed to the image development of companies and brands, including L'Oréal, Reebok, Citroën, Gianfranco Ferre, Selfridges. He is also Associate Professor of the University of the Arts London and Visiting Professor at the University of Milan IULM, Istituto Europeo di Design (IED) and at the Sapienza University of Rome.
