= Mazarinettes =

Italian noblewomen

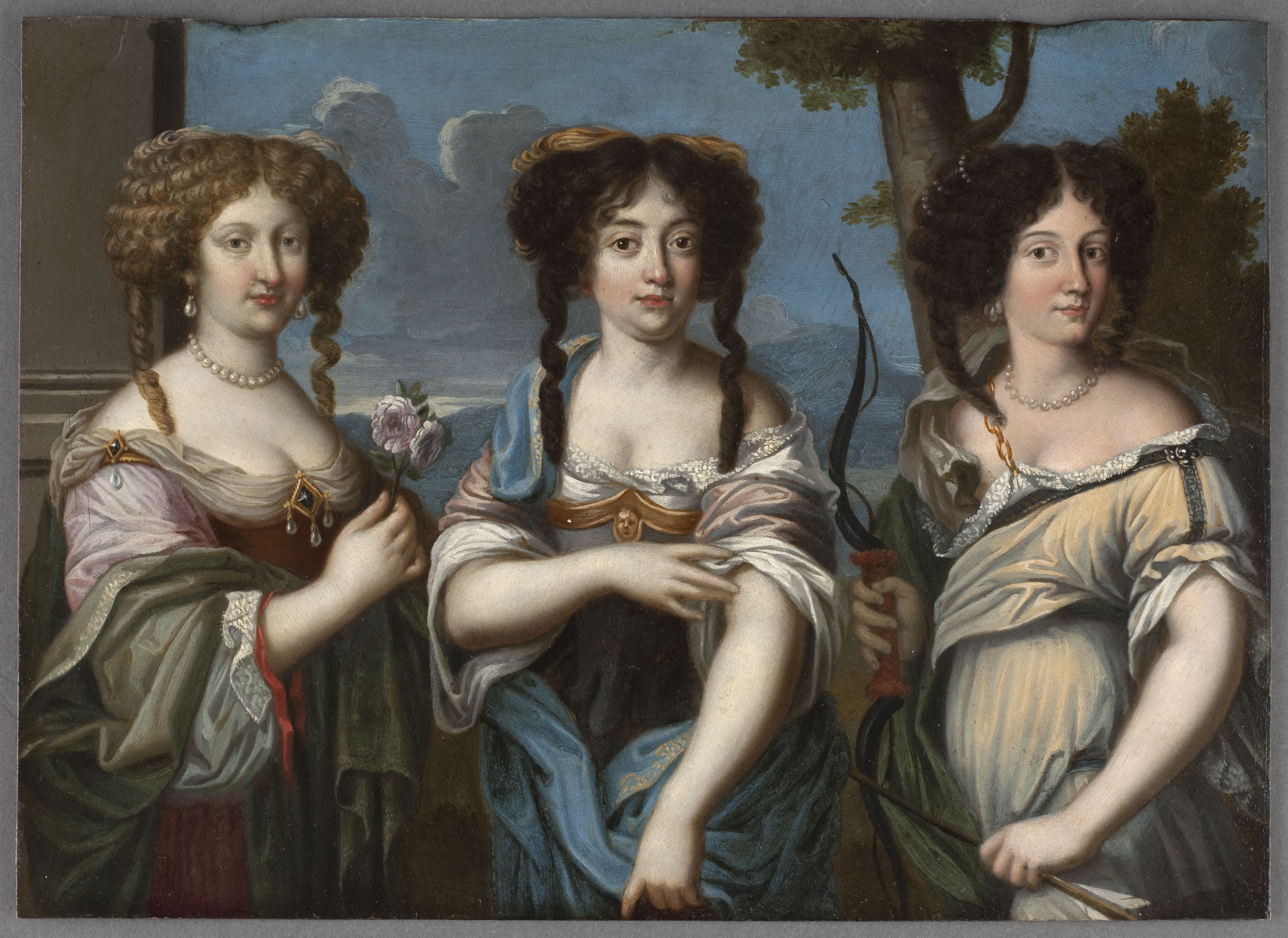
Three of the Mazarinettes portrayed as goddesses, Venus, Juno and Diana: Olympia (left), Hortense (center) and Marie Mancini (right)

The Mazarinettes were the seven nieces of Cardinal Jules Mazarin, (1639–1661), chief minister to the Kings Louis XIII and Louis XIV of France from 1642 until his death.

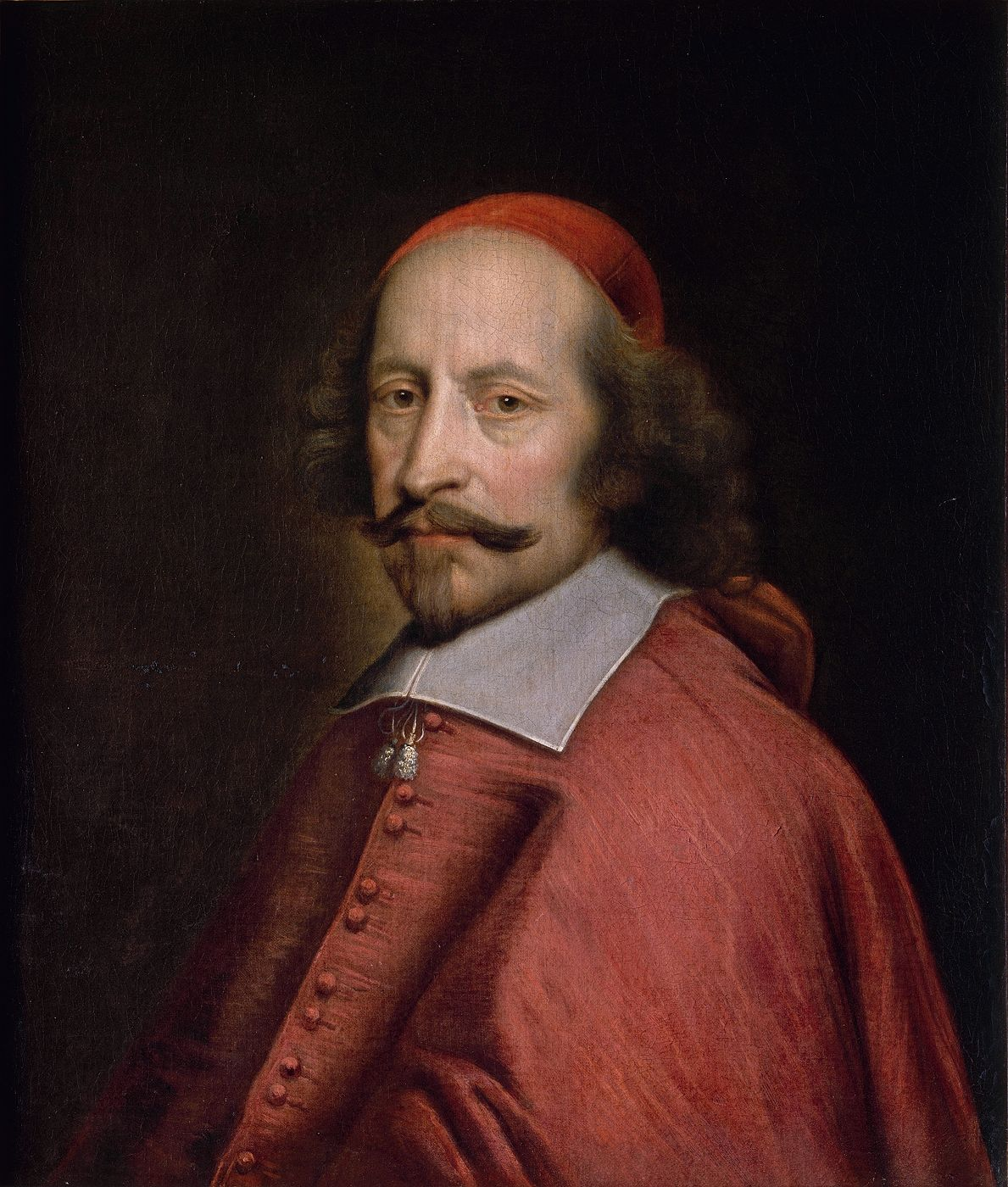
Cardinal Mazarin

They were the daughters of the cardinal's two sisters, Laura Margherita (died 1685), the wife of Girolamo Martinozzi, and Girolama, (1614–1656), the wife of Michele Lorenzo Mancini. In 1647, Mazarin brought Laura Margherita and her two daughters, ten-year-old Anne Marie and eight-year-old Laura from Italy to Paris, then, in 1650, when Girolama was widowed, she moved to France, too, with her five daughters and three sons: thirteen-year-old Laura and Paul Jules, eleven-year-old Olympia, ten-year-old Marie, nine-year-old Philippe, six-year-old Alfonso, four-year-old Hortense, and one-year-old Marie Anne.

Mazarin wished to establish a dynasty in France and secure his legacy through advantageous marriages, but could have no children of his own as a member of the Catholic clergy. He also wanted to surround himself with his family, in whom he could confide, as he had many enemies at court.

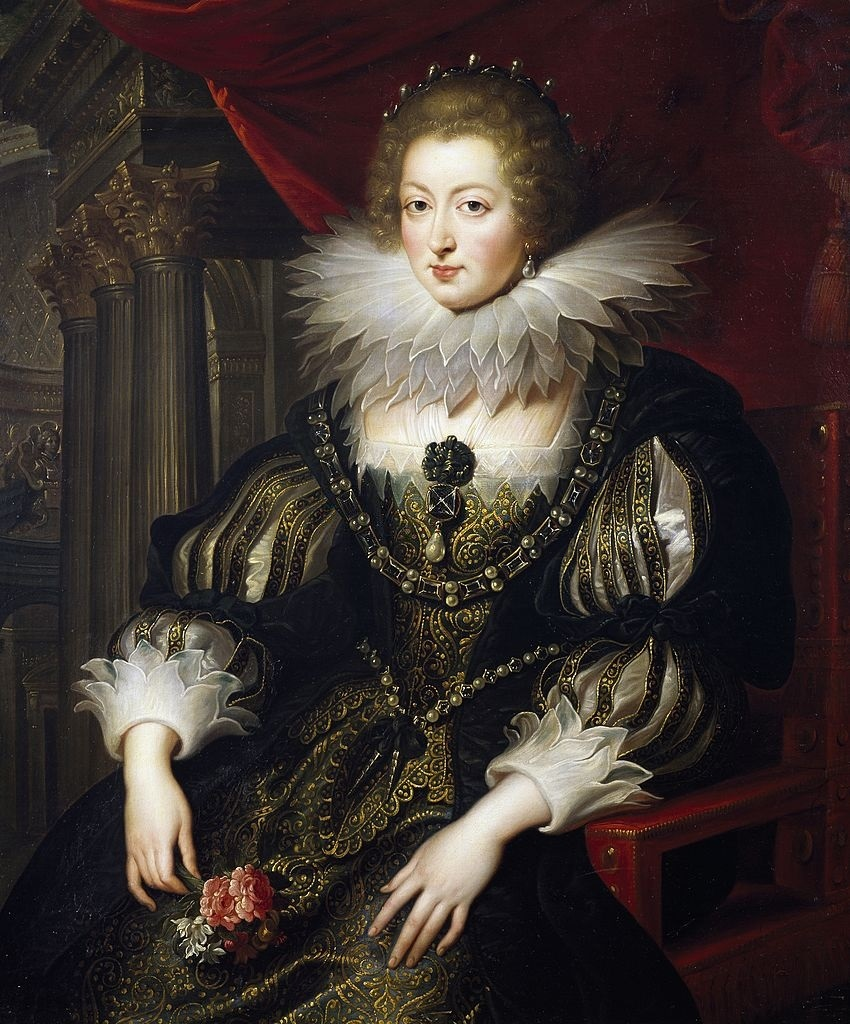
Anne of Austria

Anne of Austria, who was ruling as regent after the death of her husband, Louis XIII, and during the minority of his son, Louis XIV, from 1643 to 1651, supervised the education of the Martinozzi and Mancini children herself. She even allowed for the younger children to be educated with the king and his younger brother, Monsieur Philippe, Duke of Anjou.

In Paris, where the beauty ideal was pale skin and a full figure, the darker complexion and thinner build of the Italian girls were widely talked about. The Mazarinettes were discussed in the Mazarinades, the anti-Mazarin pamphlets published in France between 1648 and 1653. One of them described them as follows:

French original

Elles ont les yeux d'un hibou,
L'écorce blanche comme un chou,
Les sourcils d'une âme damnée,
Et le teint d'une cheminée.

English translation

They possess the eyes of an owl,
The bark as white as a cabbage,
The eyebrows of a damned soul,
And a complexion of a chimney.

Other Mazarinades called them "dirt princesses" and "stinking snakes".

When the Mazarinettes were officially presented at court, Marshal Villeroy said to the king's uncle, Gaston, Duke of Orléans:

Here are young ladies who just at present are not rich at all, but who soon shall have beautiful castles, good incomes, precious stones, substantial silver plate, and perchance great rank...

Voilà des petites demoiselles qui présentement ne sont point riches, mais qui bientôt auront de beaux châteaux, de bonnes rentes, de belles pierreries, de bonne vaisselle d'argent, et peut-être de grandes dignités...

The Mazarinettes' lives and luck were tied to the fortune of their uncle. During the series of civil wars known as the Fronde (between 1648 and 1653), they were forced to flee Paris and go into exile twice. Once the revolts were crushed and Cardinal Mazarin restored to power, he arranged advantageous marriages for his nieces with powerful French and Italian aristocrats, and gave large dowries to their husbands in order to overcome their reluctance to marry women of lower origins.

The Mazarinettes were:

- Laura Victoria Mancini (6 May 1636 – 8 February 1657), who married Louis de Bourbon (1612–1669) in 1651, becoming the Duchess of Mercœur, and had issue
- Anne Marie Martinozzi (1637 – 4 February 1672), who served as Surintendante de la Maison de la Reine for Anne of Austria between 1657 and 1666, and married Armand de Bourbon (1629–1666) in 1654, becoming the Princess of Conti, and had issue, among them François Louis de Bourbon, known as Le Grand Conti ("The Great Conti"), an infamous libertine
- Olympia Mancini (11 July 1638 – 9 October 1708), who became involved in the Affair of the Poisons, for which she was exiled from France. She married Eugene Maurice of Savoy-Carginan (1635–1673) in 1657, becoming the Countess of Soissons, and had issue, among them Prince Eugen of Savoy, one of the most successful military commanders of his time
- Laura Martinozzi (27 May 1639 – 19 July 1687), who married Alfonso IV d'Este (1634–1662) in 1655, becoming the Duchess of Modena, and had issue, among them Mary of Modena, queen consort of England, Scotland and Ireland, from whom the Jacobite pretenders to the English throne descend. Laura ruled as the regent of Modena during the minority of her son, between 1662 and 1674
- Anne Marie Mancini (28 August 1639 – 8 May 1715), who was the first love of Louis XIV, and was banished from court to make the king's political marriage to Maria Theresa of Spain possible. She married Lorenzo Onofrio Colonna (1637–1689) in 1661, becoming the Duchess and Princess of Paliano, and had issue
- Hortense Mancini (6 June 1646 – 2 July 1699), the cardinal's favorite niece, who married Armand-Charles de La Porte (1632–1713), in 1661, becoming Duchess Mazarin, and had issue. She was the official mistress of King Charles II of England, Scotland and Ireland
- Marie Anne Mancini (1649 – 20 June 1714), a patron of the arts, who was tried in court and exiled from Paris for being involved in Affair of the Poisons, but was never convicted. She married Godefroy Maurice de La Tour d'Auvergne (1636-1721) in 1662, becoming the Duchess of Bouillon, and had issue
Portraits of the Mazarinettes

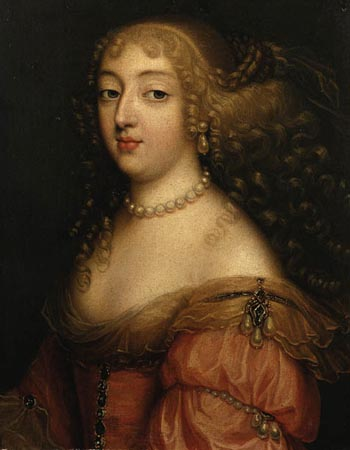
Laura Mancini, Duchess of Mercœur

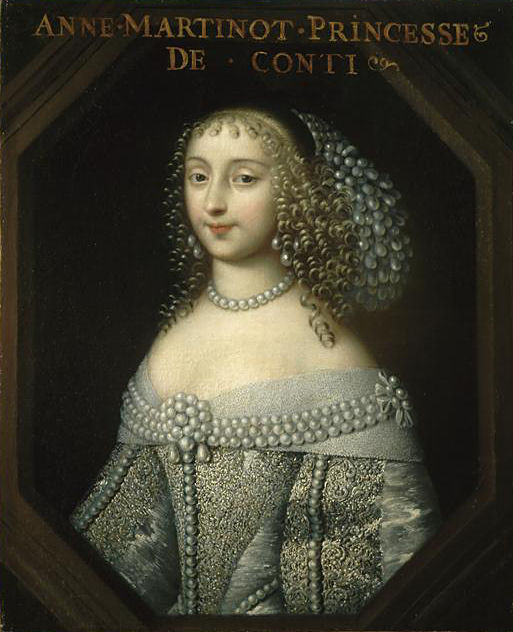
Anne Marie Martinozzi, Princess of Conti

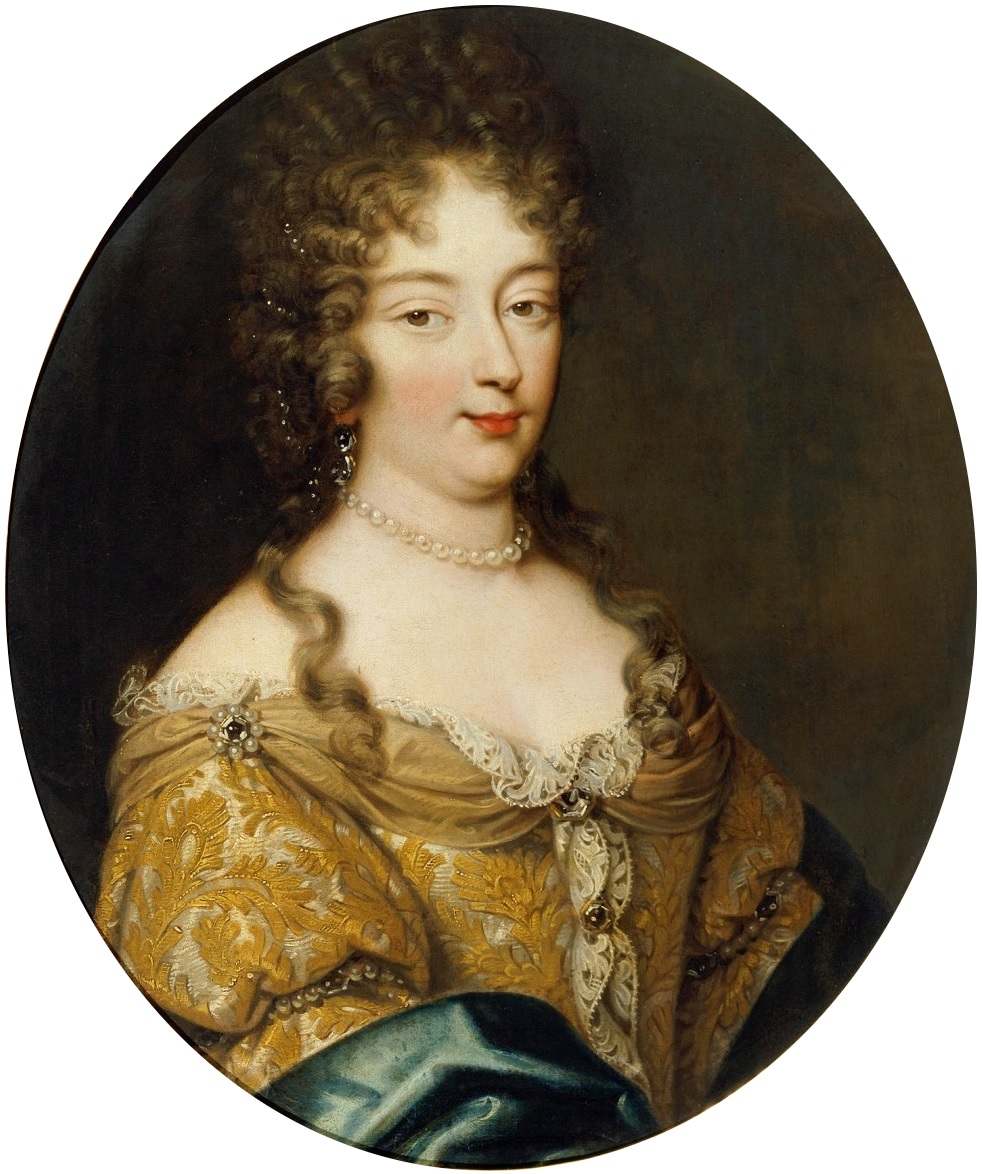
Olympia Mancini, Countess of Soissons

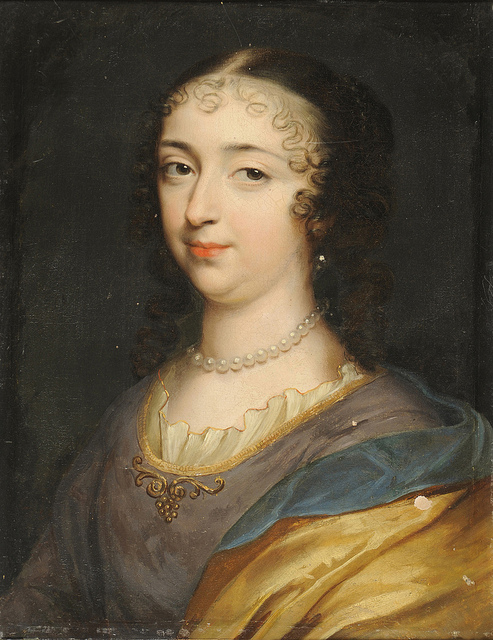
Laura Martinozzi, Duchess of Modena

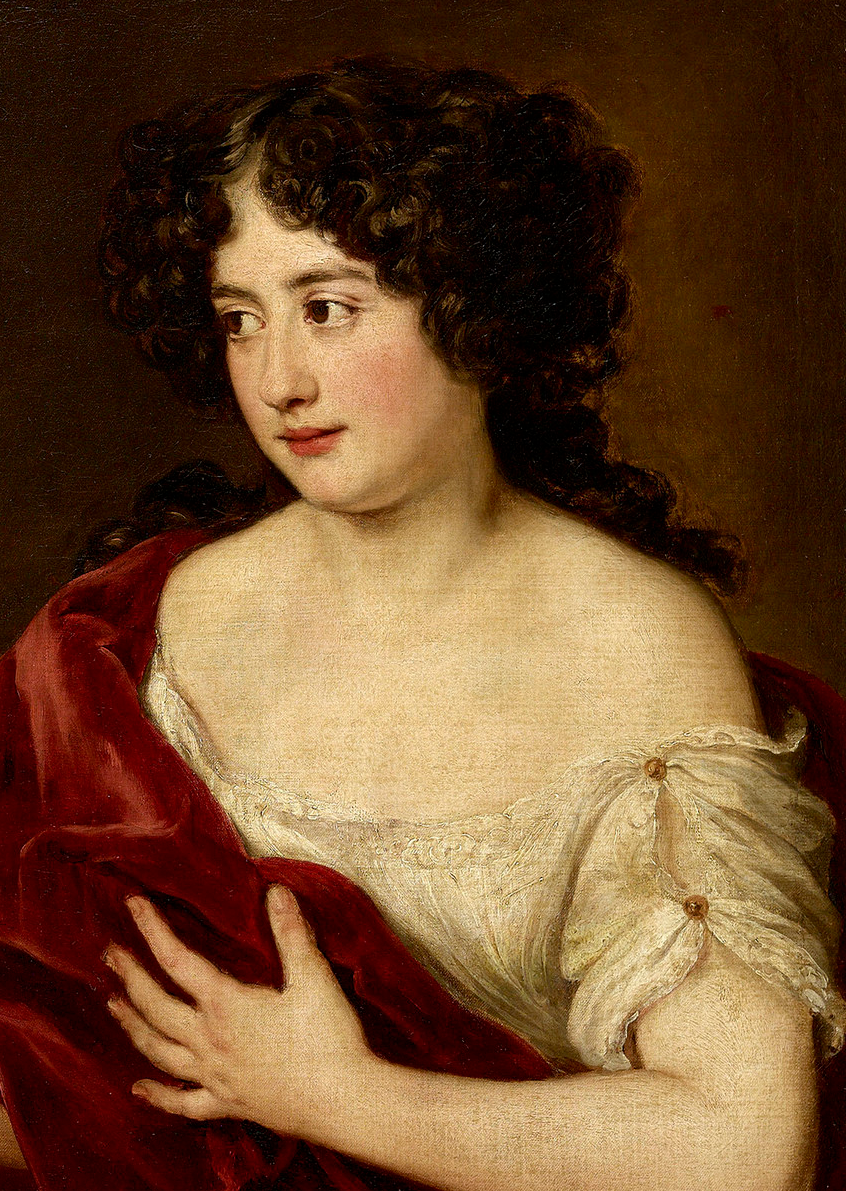
Marie Mancini, Duchess and Princess of Paliano

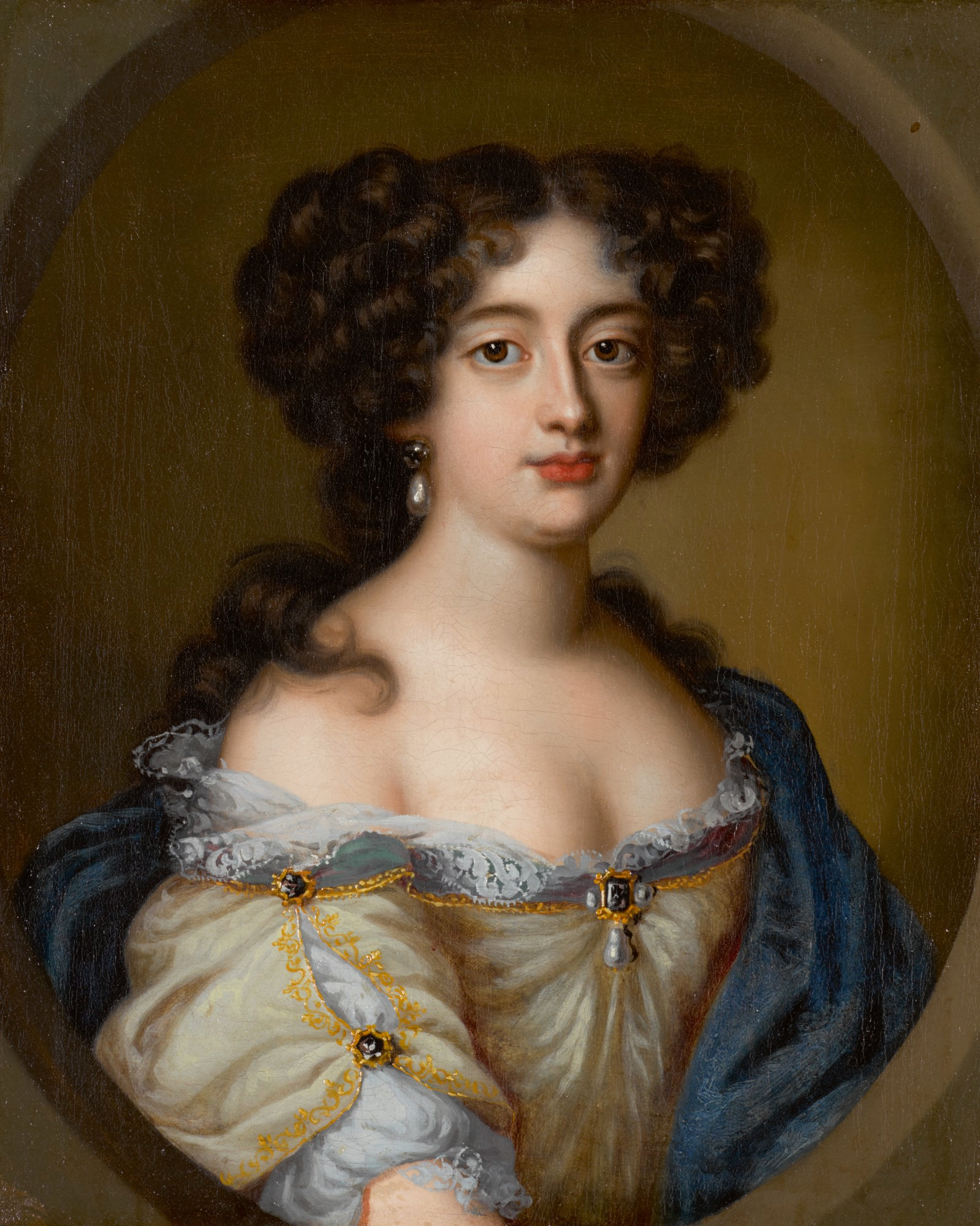
Hortense Mancini, Duchess Mazarin

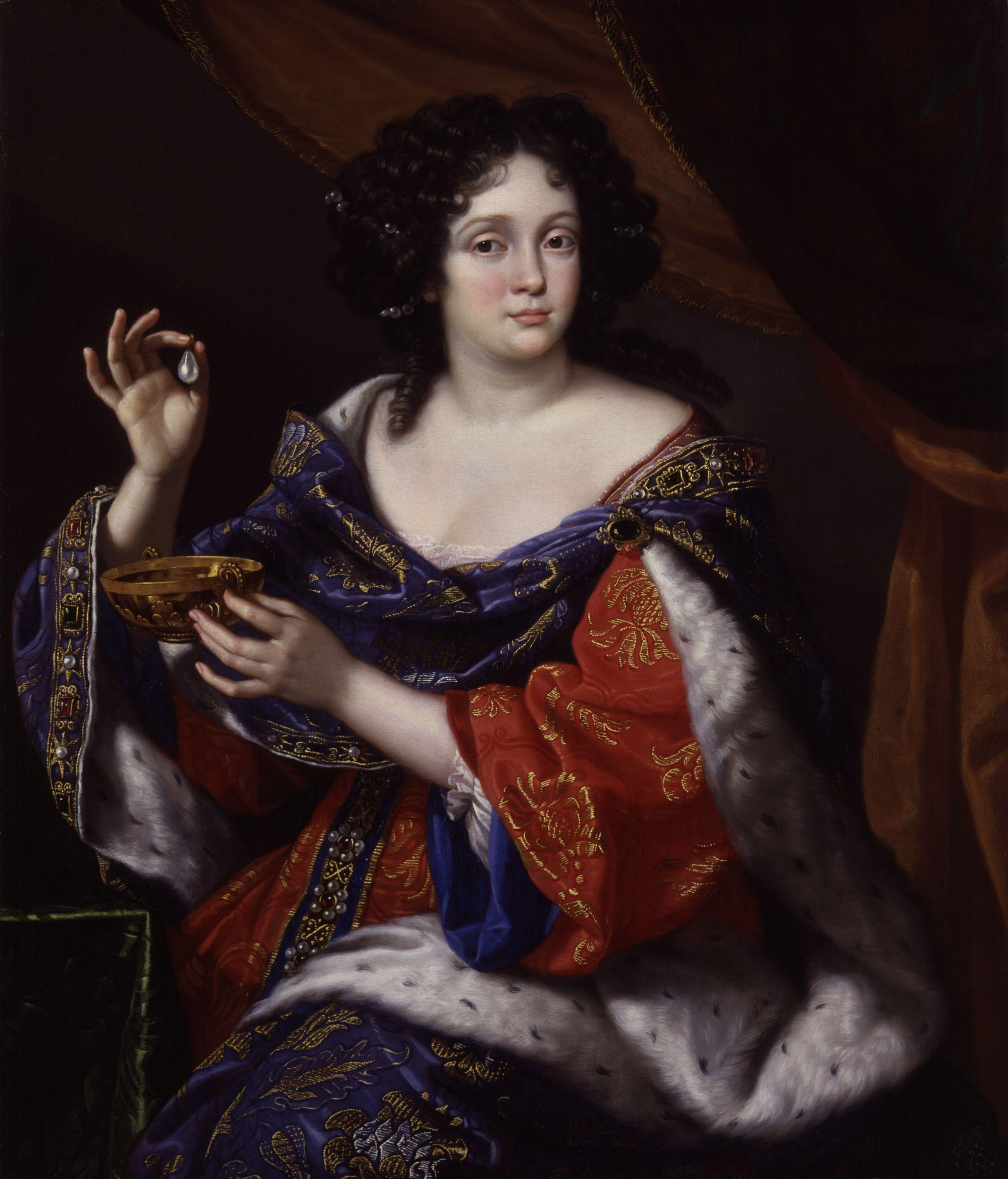
Marie Anne Mancini, Duchess of Bouillon
