= Laura Margherita Mazzarino =

Lady at the court of Louis XIV

- Born: May 4, 1608; Chieti
- Died: 9 June 1685; Milan
- Noble family: Mazzarini
- Spouse: Girolamo Martinozzi
- Father: Pietro Mazzarino
- Mother: Ortensia Buffalini

Laura Margherita Mazzarino (4 May 1608–9 June 1685) was an Italian noblewoman, the daughter of Pietro Mazzarino and his wife Ortensia Buffalini.

== Life and career ==
On 9 July 1634 she was married to Count Girolamo Martinozzi (b. 1610). They had two daughters: Anna Maria (Rome, 1637 - Paris, 4 February 1672) and Laura (Fano, 22 April 1639 - Rome, 19 July 1687).

In 1647 she was called by her brother Jules Mazarin, minister to Louis XIV with her sister and daughters, to settle at the French royal court because, under the protection of her brother, she would be able to marry her daughters to powerful men. Mazzarino lived with the rest of the family, first at Aix-en-Provence, then in the palace of her brother and finally settled at the court of Queen Anne of Austria, in the apartment of the Marquise de La Rochefoucauld.

Courtiers, seeking to win the favor of powerful Mazarin, sought in every way to please both Laura and her family. Queen Anne personally took care of the girls' education. Unlike her sister Geronima who, in the words of the abbot of Choisy, "did not ever bother anyone," Laura was more ambitious.

Her brother managed to find good matches for the Martinozzis: Laura was married to Alfonso IV d'Este; Anna Maria to Armand, Prince of Conti. A daughter of Laura, Maria Beatrice d'Este, became Queen of England, Scotland and Ireland through marriage to James II of England.
