= Lanci =

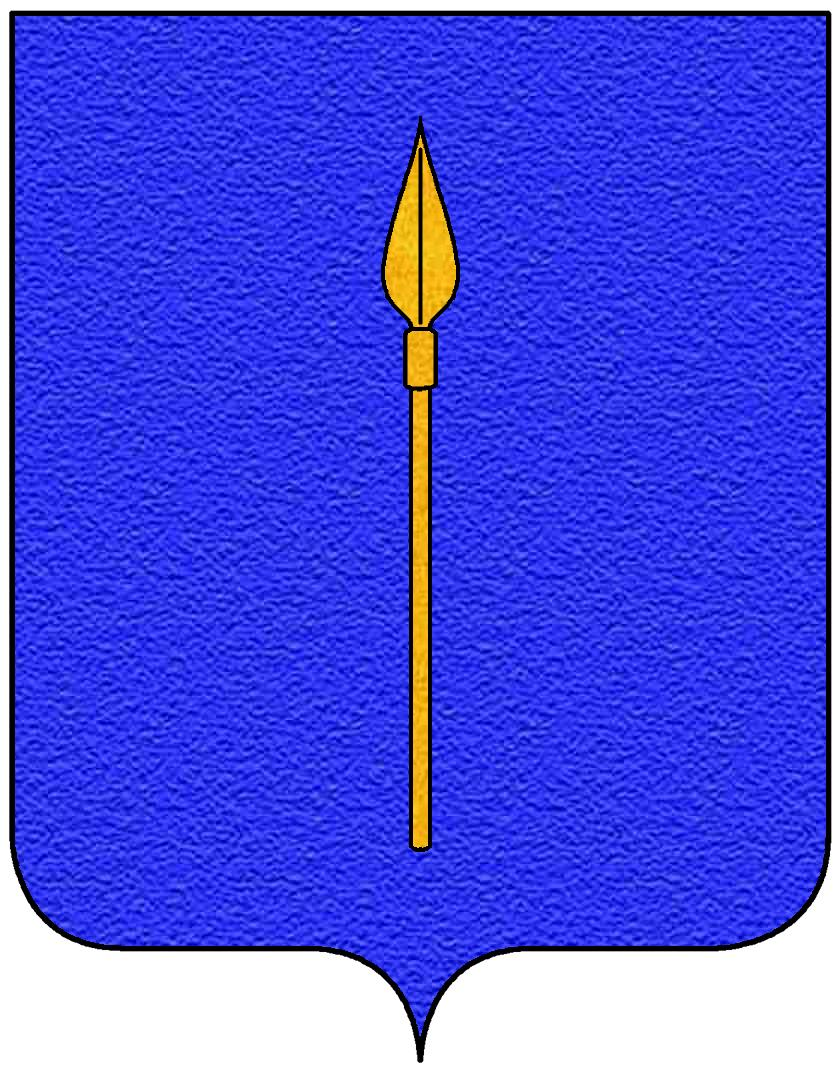
Coat of Arms of the Lanci family

The Lanci family (Italian pronunciation: [ˈlantʃi]) is an old Italian noble family, originated in Bologna, region of Emilia-Romagna.

'Lanci is also an Italian surname.

== Notable people ==
- Baldassarre Lanci (1510–1571), Italian inventor
- Giuseppe Lanci (born 1942), Italian cinematographer

== See also ==
- Lance (surname)
