= Bertozzi =

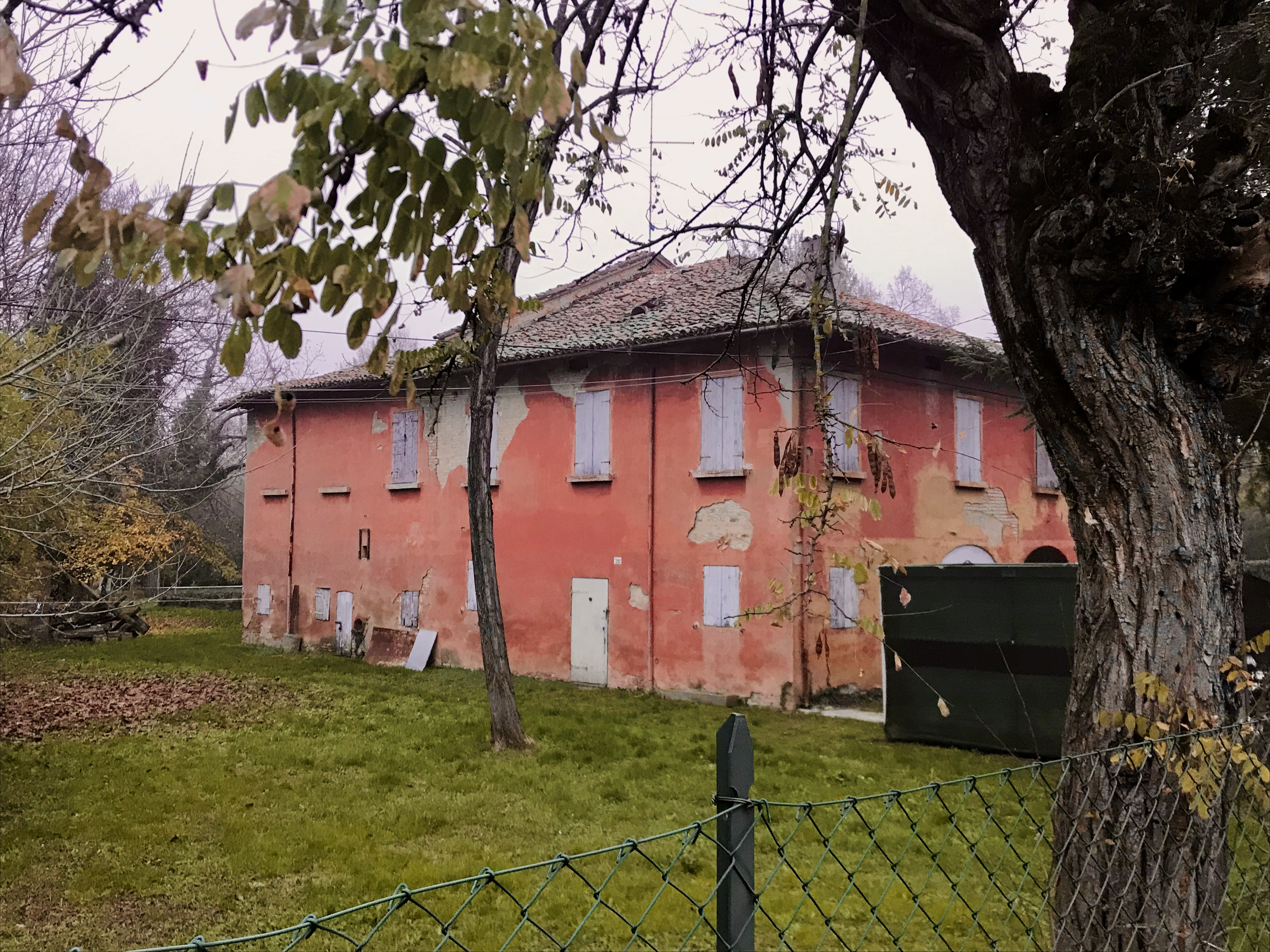
Villa Bertozzi in Baragalla, recently served as a Casino, region of Emilia-Romagna, Northern Italy, Italy

The Bertozzi family is an old minor Italian noble family, settled in Emilia-Romagna, originally from Fano in the Province of Pesaro and Urbino, Marche.

Bertozzi is also an Italian surname.

== Notable people ==
- Andrea Bertozzi (born 1965), American mathematician
- Carolyn Bertozzi (born 1966), American chemist and Nobel laureate
- Nick Bertozzi (born 1970), American comic book writer and artist
- William Bertozzi, American physicist
