= Marcolini =

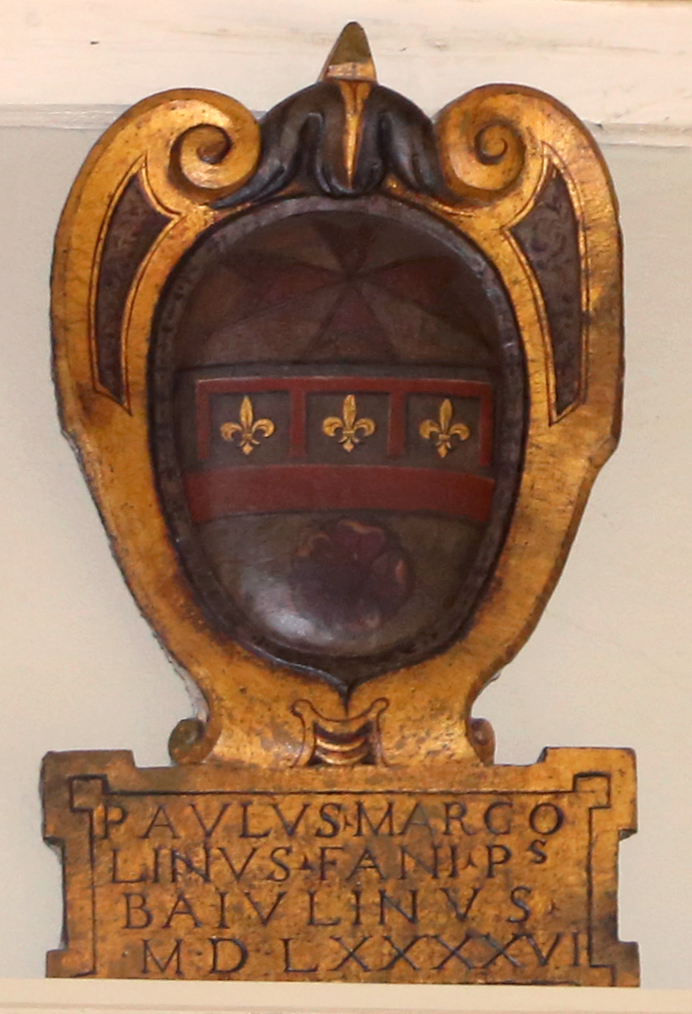
Coat of arms of the Marcolini family (1596)

The Marcolini family is an old Italian noble family, whose members held the title of Count. In the 1752, one branch of the family, Marcolini-Ferretti, settled in the Electorate of Saxony and served there mostly as statesman, while members of the Italian Marcolini branch held significant ecclesiastical positions throughout history of Roman Catholic Church.

Marcolini is also an Italian surname.

== Notable people with the surname, including members of the nobility ==
- Count Camillo Marcolini (1739–1814), minister of the fine arts, in the Electorate of Saxony
- Eufrosina Marcolini Popescu (1821–1900), belongs to the 1st generation of Romanian stage actor
- Giovanni Marcolini O.F.M. (died 1465), Bishop of Nocera de' Pagani
- Leandro Marcolini Pedroso de Almeida, Hungarian footballer
- Lucas Marcolini Dantas Bertucci (born 1989), Brazilian midfielder player
- Marcantonio Marcolini (1721–1782), Italian Roman Catholic bishop and cardinal
- Marietta Marcolini (1780–1855), Italian operatic contralto
- Michele Marcolini, Italian footballer
- Pierre Marcolini (born 1964), Belgian chocolatier

== See also ==
- Marcoli
