= Louis Henri de La Tour d'Auvergne =

Count of Évreux (1679–1753)

Louis Henri
- Count of Évreux
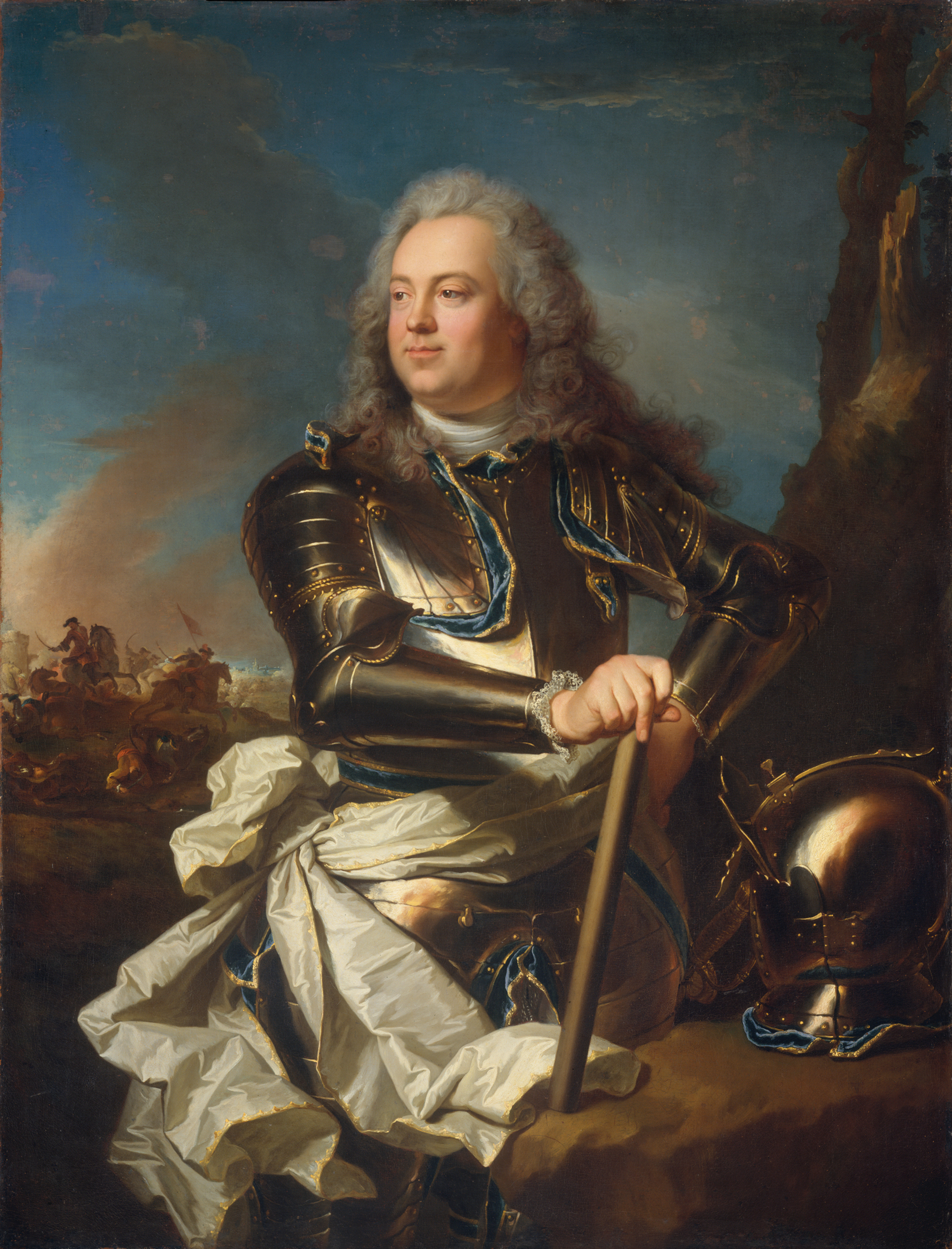
- Louis Henri by Hyacinthe Rigaud, 1720
- Born: 2 August 1679; Paris, France
- Died: 3 August 1753 (aged 74); Hôtel d'Évreux, Paris
- Spouse: Marie Anne Crozat
Names
- Louis Henri de La Tour d'Auvergne
- House: La Tour d'Auvergne
- Father: Godefroy Maurice de La Tour d'Auvergne
- Mother: Marie Anne Mancini

Louis Henri de La Tour d'Auvergne (2 August 1679 – 3 August 1753) was a French nobleman and member of the House of La Tour d'Auvergne. Given the title comte d'Évreux at birth, he later became a lieutenant of the King's armies. He is sometimes called Henri Louis. He had no children and thus no descendants.

== Biography ==
Born in Paris to Godefroy Maurice de La Tour d'Auvergne, ruler of sovereign Duchy of Bouillon and his Italian born wife Marie Anne Mancini. His maternal first cousins included the famous generals Prince Eugene of Savoy and Louis Joseph de Bourbon. His mother was a niece of Cardinal Mazarin.

He was married to Marie Anne Crozat (1696–1729), the eldest daughter of Antoine Crozat, marquis du Châtel, founder of an immense fortune, who was the first private proprietary owner of French Louisiana from 1712 to 1717.

The ceremony occurred on 3 August 1707 and the couple had no children. Marie Anne's uncle was Pierre Crozat, a well known art collector. Marie Anne bought a small dowry of 15,000 livres, was aged twelve, while Louis Henri was thirty two.

Louis Henri was responsible for the construction of the Hôtel d'Élysée (formerly called the Hôtel d'Évreux) in Paris. He bought the site in 1718 from Armand-Claude Mollet who possessed a property fronting on the road to the village of Roule, west of Paris. In 1718, Louis Henri bought this property and transformed it into his private residence. Finished in 1722, it served as his main residence and seat during the Regency of Philippe d'Orléans for the infant Louis XV. Louis Henri and Philippe were good friends.

At his death, his Hôtel was sold to Louis XV who gave it to Madame de Pompadour. It was later the property of Bathilde d'Orléans, sister of Philippe Égalité.

In 1720, the famed Hyacinthe Rigaud immortalised Louis Henri with a painting (shown above). It is today held at Versailles.

In 1721, his father died and Louis Henri's older brother Emmanuel Théodose succeeded as ruler of the Duchy of Bouillon, which had been in the family since 1594.

At Louis Henri's death in Paris, the county of Évreux reverted to the House of La Tour d'Auvergne as one of their subsidiary titles.

His nieces included Armande, wife of Louis de Melun; Marie Hortense Victoire de La Tour d'Auvergne, wife of Charles Armand René de La Trémoille and Anne Marie Louise, princesse de Soubise and wife of Charles de Rohan.

His youngest niece, Marie Charlotte, who was orphaned in 1737 was raised by Louis Henri and later married the Prince of Craon.

He was a great nephew of Turenne.

== Ancestry ==
Ancestors of Louis Henri de La Tour d'Auvergne

8. Henri de La Tour d'Auvergne
4. Frédéric Maurice de La Tour d'Auvergne
9. Countess Elisabeth of Nassau
2. Godefroy Maurice de La Tour d'Auvergne
10. Frederik, Count van den Bergh
5. Eleonora Catharina of the Bergh
11. Françoise de Ravenel
1. Louis Henri de La Tour d'Auvergne
12. Paolo Mancini
6. Lorenzo Mancini
13. Vittoria Capocci
3. Marie Anne Mancini
14. Pietro Mazzarini
7. Girolama Mazzarini
15. Ortensia Bufalini
