= Frédéric Maurice Casimir de La Tour d'Auvergne =

Frédéric Maurice Casimir
- Prince of Turenne
- Born: 22 October 1702
- Died: 1 October 1723 (aged 20)
- Spouse: Maria Karolina Sobieska
Names
- Frédéric Maurice Casimir de La Tour d'Auvergne
- House: La Tour d'Auvergne
- Father: Emmanuel Théodose de La Tour d'Auvergne
- Mother: Marie Armande Victoire de La Trémouille

Frédéric Maurice Casimir de La Tour d'Auvergne (Frédéric Maurice Casimir; 24 October 1702 – 1 October 1723) styled Prince of Turenne, was the eldest surviving son of Emmanuel Théodose de La Tour d'Auvergne (1668–1730). He died aged 20. He was the short-lived son-in-law of James Louis Sobieski.

== Biography ==
Frédéric Maurice Casimir was born to Emmanuel Théodose de La Tour d'Auvergne (1668–1730) and his first wife Marie Armande Victoire de La Trémouille. His father was the ruler of the Duchy of Bouillon, a small principality in present-day Belgium. The second of their sons, he was not styled prince de Turenne till his older brother's death (Godefroy Maurice) in 1705 aged just 3.

From 1705, he was his father's heir apparent. Engaged to Maria Karolina Sobieska, daughter of James Louis Sobieski, sister of Clementina Sobieski and grand daughter of John III Sobieski, the young prince had a proxy marriage on 25 August 1723 at Neuss, Silesia.

Having been married in person in Strassburg on 20 September, he died whilst travelling back. Buried in Münster, his wife of only two months later married his younger brother Charles Godefroy, who, as a result of Frédéric Maurice Casimir's death became Prince of Turenne.

== Ancestry ==
Ancestors of Frédéric Maurice Casimir de La Tour d'Auvergne

16. Henri de La Tour d'Auvergne, Duke of Bouillon
8. Frédéric Maurice de La Tour d'Auvergne, Duke of Bouillon
17. Countess Elisabeth of Nassau
4. Godefroy Maurice de La Tour d'Auvergne, Duke of Bouillon
18. Frederik, Count van den Bergh
9. Countess Eleonora van den Bergh
19. Françoise de Ravenel
2. Emmanuel Théodose de La Tour d'Auvergne, Duke of Bouillon
20. Pietro Mazzarini
10. Michele Lorenzo Mancini
21. Ortensia Bufalini
5. Marie Anne Mancini
22. Paolo Mancini
11. Girolama Mazzarini
23. Vittoria Capocci
1. Frédéric Maurice Casimir de La Tour d'Auvergne
24. Henri de La Trémoïlle
12. Henri Charles de La Trémoïlle
25. Marie de La Tour d'Auvergne
6. Charles Belgique Hollande de La Trémoille
26. William V, Landgrave of Hesse-Kassel
13. Émilie of Hesse-Kassel
27. Amalie Elisabeth of Hanau-Münzenberg
3. Marie Victoire de La Trémoïlle
28. Charles, Duke of Créquy
14. Charles, Duke of Créquy
29. Anne Grimoard du Roure
7. Madeleine de Créquy
30. Gilles de Saint-Gelais, Marquess of Balon
15. Anne Armande de Saint-Gelais
31. Marie de Vallée-Fossez, Marchioness of Everly
