= Charles Belgique Hollande de La Trémoille, 5th Duke of Thouars =

4th duke of Thouars

Charles Belgique Hollande de La Trémoille
- 5th Duke of Thouars (more...)

5th Duke of Thouars
- Period: 21 January 1674 – 1 June 1709
- Predecessor: Prince Henri de La Trémoille
- Successor: Charles Louis Bretagne de La Trémoille
- Born: May 1655; The Hague, United Provinces of the Netherlands (now Kingdom of the Netherlands)
- Died: 1 June 1709 (aged 54); Paris, Place Saint-Sulpice, Kingdom of France (now Fifth French Republic
- Noble family: La Trémoille
- Spouses: Madeleine de Créquy (m. 1675 - 1707; her death)
- Issue: Marie Armande, Princess of Turenne; Charles Louis Bretagne, 6th Duke of Thouars
- Father: Henri Charles de La Trémoille
- Mother: Princess Emilie of Hesse-Kassel

Charles Belgique Hollande de La Trémoïlle, 5th Duke of Thouars (May 1655 – 1 June 1709), 5th Duke of Thouars, was a French nobleman.

== Early life ==
He was the second child and eldest son of Henri Charles de La Trémoille (son and heir of Henri de La Trémoille, 3rd Duke of Thouars and his wife Marie de La Tour d'Auvergne) and his wife Princess Emilie of Hesse-Kassel (daughter of William V, Landgrave of Hesse-Kassel and his wife Countess Amalie Elisabeth of Hanau-Münzenberg).

== Religion ==
Brought up a Calvinist, in 1668 his father had converted to Catholicism and then forcibly converted his children as well. His mother and eldest sister fled to the Netherlands.

== Marriage ==
On 3 April 1675 he married Madeleine de Créquy (1655-1707), daughter and heiress of Charles de Créquy and his wife Anne Armande de Saint Gelais. The couple had two children:

== Children ==
1. Marie Armande de La Trémoille (1677–1717) who married Emmanuel Théodose de La Tour d'Auvergne, Duke of Bouillon, The Prince of Turenne (later Reigning Duke of Bouillon from 1721); They had seven children.
2. Charles Louis Bretagne de La Trémoille who succeeded him as The 6th Duke of Thouars as well as other titles in 1709; He married Marie Madeleine Motier and they had one child.

== Ancestors ==
Ancestors of Charles Belgique Hollande de La Trémoille, 5th Duke of Thouars

16. Louis III de La Trémoille
8. Claude de La Trémoille
17. Jeanne de Montmorency
4. Henri de La Trémoille
18. William the Silent (= #22, #30)
9. Charlotte Brabantina of Nassau
19. Charlotte of Bourbon (= #23, #31)
2. Henri Charles de La Trémoille
20. François de La Tour d'Auvergne
10. Henri de La Tour d'Auvergne, Duke of Bouillon
21. Eleanor de Montmorency
5. Marie de La Tour d'Auvergne
22. William the Silent (= #18, #30)
11. Countess Elisabeth of Nassau
23. Charlotte of Bourbon (= #19, #31)
1. Charles Belgique Hollande de La Trémoille
24. William IV, Landgrave of Hesse-Kassel
12. Maurice, Landgrave of Hesse-Kassel
25. Sabine of Württemberg
6. William V, Landgrave of Hesse-Kassel
26. Count John George of Solms-Laubach
13. Agnes of Solms-Laubach
27. Margaret of Schönburg-Glauchau
3. Émilie of Hesse-Kassel
28. Count Philip Louis I of Hanau-Münzenberg
14. Philip Louis II, Count of Hanau-Münzenberg
29. Magdalene of Waldeck-Wildungen
7. Amalie Elisabeth von Hanau-Münzenberg
30. William the Silent (= #18, #22)
15. Countess Catharina Belgica of Nassau
31. Charlotte of Bourbon (= #19, #23)

Charles Belgique Hollande de La Trémoille La Trémoille Family Born: May 1655 Died: 1 June 1709
French nobility
Preceded by Henri de La Trémoille	Duke of Thouars, et cetera 21 January 1674 – 1 June 1709	Succeeded by Charles Louis Bretagne de La Trémoille
