= Marie Armande de La Trémoille =

- Princess of Turenne
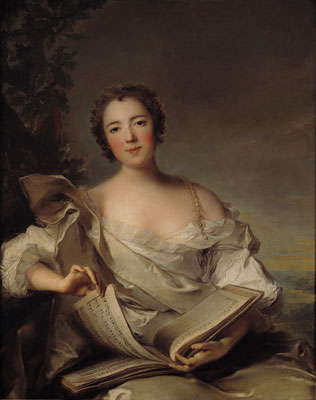
- Portrait Painting by Jean-Marc Nattier
- Born: 1677
- Died: 5 March 1717 (aged 39–40); Hôtel de Bouillon, Paris, Kingdom of France (now French Fifth Republic)
- Spouse: Prince Emmanuel Théodose I de La Tour d'Auvergne, Duke of Bouillon (m. 1696 - 1717; her death)
- Issue Detail: Princess Armande de La Tour d'Auvergne, Duchess of Joyeuse; Princess Marie Madeleine de La Tour d'Auvergne; Prince Godefroy Maurice de La Tour d'Auvergne; Prince Frédéric Maurice Casimir de La Tour d'Auvergne, Prince of Turenne; Princess Marie Hortense Victoire de La Tour d'Auvergne, Duchess of Thouars; Prince Charles Godefroy I de La Tour d'Auvergne, Duke of Bouillon
Names
- Marie Armande Victoire de La Trémoille
- House: La Trémoille
- Father: Charles Belgique Hollande de La Trémoille, 5th Duke of Thouars
- Mother: Madeleine de Créquy

Marie Armande de La Trémoille (Marie Armande Victoire; 1677 – 5 March 1717) was a French noblewoman and The Princess of Turenne by marriage.

== Biography ==
The eldest of two children, born in 1677, her parents were Charles Belgique Hollande de La Trémoille, duc de Thouars, and Madeleine de Créquy. She was engaged to a distant cousin, Emmanuel Théodose de La Tour d'Auvergne (1668–1730), son and heir of Godefroy Maurice de La Tour d'Auvergne, Duke of Bouillon (1641–1721). Emmanuel Théodose's mother was Marie Anne Mancini, niece of Cardinal Mazarin.

As heir to the Duchy of Bouillon, her husband was styled prince de Turenne. The couple were married on 1 February 1696 in the chapel of the Hôtel de Crequi, Paris, the town house of her maternal grandfather. The couple had seven children, two of whom had further issue.

Through her father, she was a second cousin of the French regent Philippe, duc d'Orléans.

The princess de Turenne died in Paris at the Hôtel de Bouillon in Paris. Her husband went on to marry three more times; firstly in 1719 to Louise Françoise Angélique Le Tellier (died 1719) a grand daughter of Louvois; again in 1720 to Anne Marie Christiane de Simiane (died 1722) and again in 1725 to Louise Henriette Françoise de Lorraine.

== Issue ==
1. Armande de La Tour d'Auvergne (28 August 1697 – 13 April 1717) married Louis de Melun, Prince d'Epinoy, duc de Joyeuse (1694–1724).
2. Marie Madeleine de La Tour d'Auvergne (22 October 1698 – 25 September 1699) died in infancy.
3. X de La Tour d'Auvergne (28 December 1699 – 30 December 1699) died in infancy.
4. Godefroy Maurice de La Tour d'Auvergne (4 May 1701 – 9 January 1705); died in infancy.
5. Frédéric Maurice Casimir de La Tour d'Auvergne, prince de Turenne (24 October 1702 – 1 October 1723); married Maria Carolina Sobieski, daughter of James Louis Sobieski and sister of Maria Clementina Sobieski; died in an accident at Strassburg; no issue.
6. Marie Hortense Victoire de La Tour d'Auvergne (27 January 1704 – 1741); married Charles Armand René de La Trémoille and had issue.
7. Charles Godefroy de La Tour d'Auvergne, Duke of Bouillon (16 July 1706 – 24 October 1771); married his brother's widow, Maria Karolina Sobieski, and had issue.

== Ancestry ==
Ancestors of Marie Armande de La Trémoille

8. Henri de La Trémoille, 3rd Duke of Thouars
4. Henri Charles de La Trémoille, 4th Duke of Thouars
9. Marie de La Tour d'Auvergne
2. Charles Belgique Hollande de La Trémoille, 5th Duke of Thouars
10. William V, Landgrave of Hesse-Kassel
5. Princess Emilie of Hesse-Kassel
11. Countess Amalie Elisabeth of Hanau-Münzenberg
1. Marie Armande de La Trémoille
12. Charles II de Créquy, prince de Poix
6. Charles III de Créquy, prince de Poix
13. Anne de Beauvoir du Roure
3. Madeleine de Créquy
14. Gilles de Saint-Gelais, marquis de Lansac
7. Anne Armande de Saint-Gelais
15. Marie de La Vallée-Fossez, marquise d'Everly
