= Armande de La Tour d'Auvergne =

Armande
- Princess of Epinoy
- Born: 28 August 1697
- Died: 13 April 1717 (aged 19)
- Spouse: Louis de Melun
Names
- Armande de La Tour d'Auvergne
- House: La Tour d'Auvergne
- Father: Emmanuel Théodose de La Tour d'Auvergne
- Mother: Marie Armande Victoire de La Trémouille

Armande de La Tour d'Auvergne (28 August 1697 – 13 April 1717) was a French noblewoman and Princess of Epinoy by marriage. She died without issue.

== Biography ==
Armande was the eldest of seven children born to Emmanuel Théodose de La Tour d'Auvergne - sovereign Duke of Bouillon - and his first wife Marie Armande Victoire de La Trémouille. Her mother died in 1717 and her father married three more times and had three more children.

She married Louis de Melun, Duke of Joyeuse and Prince of Epinoy on 23 February 1716. His parents were Louis de Melun and Élisabeth Thérèse de Lorraine.

Armande died in 1717 a month after her mother. Her husband was later the secret spouse of Marie Anne de Bourbon (1697–1741), daughter of Monsieur le Duc and Madame la Duchesse, daughter of Madame de Montespan. Louis de Melun later disappeared in 1724 under mysterious circumstances.

== Ancestry ==
Ancestors of Armande de La Tour d'Auvergne

8. Frédéric Maurice de La Tour d'Auvergne, Duke of Bouillon
4. Godefroy Maurice de La Tour d'Auvergne, Duke of Bouillon
9. Countess Eleonora van den Bergh
2. Emmanuel Théodose de La Tour d'Auvergne, Duke of Bouillon
10. Michele Lorenzo Mancini
5. Marie Anne Mancini
11. Girolama Mazzarini
1. Armande de La Tour d'Auvergne
12. Henri Charles de La Trémoïlle
6. Charles Belgique Hollande de La Trémoille
13. Émilie of Hesse-Kassel
3. Marie Victoire de La Trémoïlle
14. Charles, Duke of Créquy
7. Madeleine de Créquy
15. Anne Armande de Saint-Gelais
