= Charles Louis Bretagne de La Trémoille, 6th Duke of Thouars =

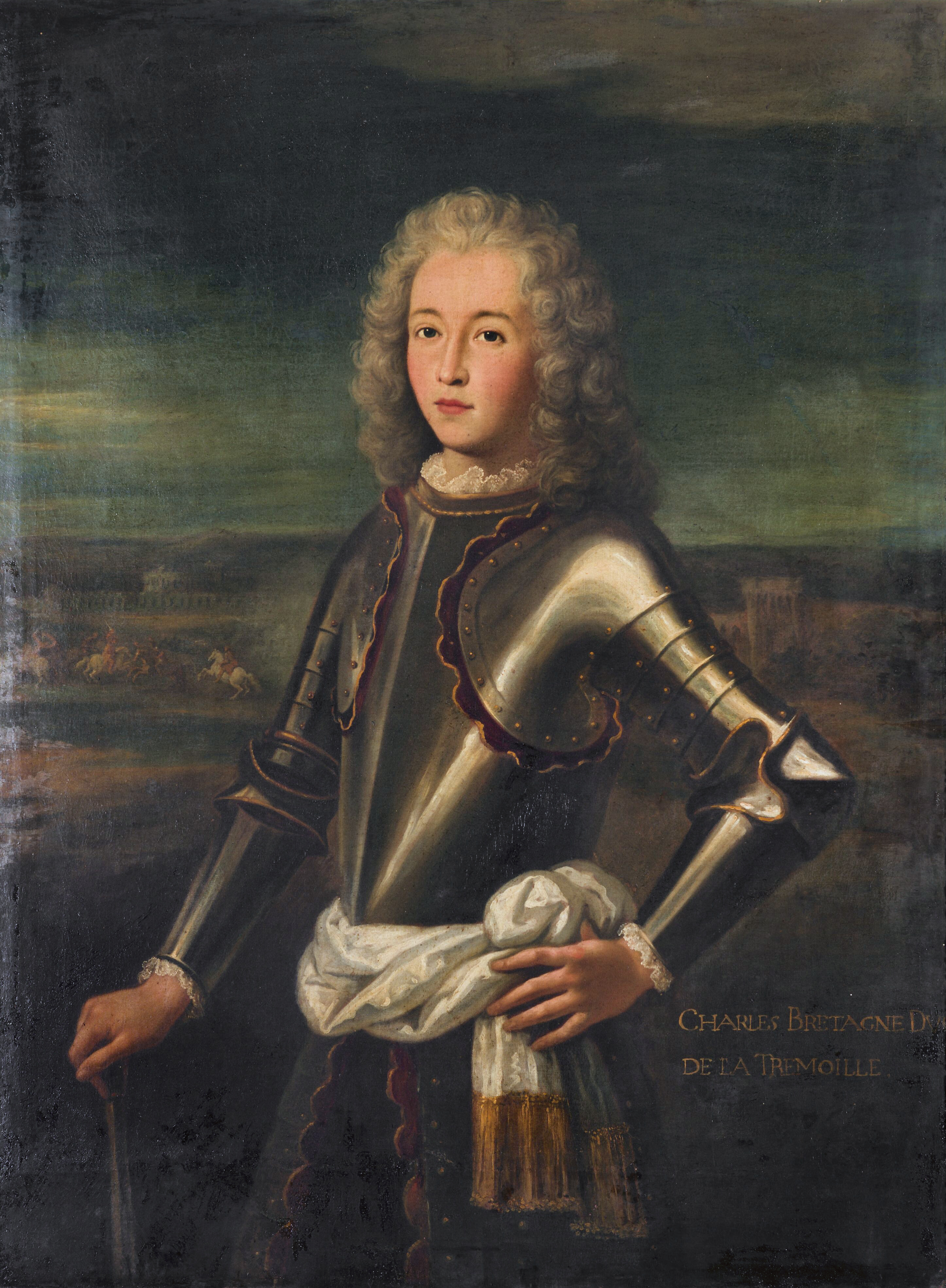
Charles Louis Bretagne de La Tremoille (1683-1719)

Charles Louis Bretagne de La Trémoille, 6th Duke of Thouars (15 March 1683 – 9 October 1719), 6th duke of Thouars, was the son of Charles Belgique Hollande de La Trémoille and Madeleine de Créquy, daughter and heiress of Charles III de Créquy.

He became duke of Thouars upon his father's death in 1709. He was also count of Laval and Montfort and inherited the ancient French claim to the Kingdom of Naples. The Neapolitan claim gave the family the rank of princes étrangers at the French court. The Duke made a career in the military as well as at Versailles: he was brigadier of cavalry (January 1709), first gentleman of the King's chamber (June 1709), governor of Thouars (July 1709), and Maréchal de camp (February 1719).

His sister Marie Armande Victoire de La Trémoille married Emmanuel Théodose de La Tour d'Auvergne.

On 13 April 1706 he married Marie-Madeleine Motier de La Fayette (1691–1717), the daughter of Rene-Armand, marquis de La Fayette and Marie-Madeleine de Marillac, and granddaughter of the author Marie-Madeleine Pioche de la Vergne, comtesse de la Fayette. They had one child, Charles Armand René de La Trémoille, born in 1708.

== Ancestry ==
Ancestors of Charles Louis Bretagne de La Trémoille, 6th Duke of Thouars

16. Claude de La Trémoille
8. Henri de La Trémoille
17. Countess Charlotte Brabantina of Nassau
4. Henri Charles de La Trémoille
18. Henri de La Tour d'Auvergne
9. Marie de La Tour d'Auvergne
19. Countess Elisabeth of Nassau
2. Charles Belgique Hollande de La Trémoille
20. Maurice, Landgrave of Hesse-Kassel
10. William V, Landgrave of Hesse-Kassel
21. Countess Agnes of Solms-Laubach
5. Émilie of Hesse-Kassel
22. Philip Louis II of Hanau-Münzenberg
11. Countess Amalie Elisabeth of Hanau-Münzenberg
23. Countess Catharina Belgica of Nassau
1. Charles Louis Bretagne de La Trémoille
24. Charles I de Blanchefort, Marquis de Créquy, Prince de Poix, Duc de Lesdiguières
12. Charles II de Créquy, seigneur de Canaple
25. Madeleine de Bonne de Lesdiguières
6. Charles de Créquy, Duke of Créquy
26. Claude du Roure, seigneur of Bonneval
13. Anne de Grimoard of Beauvoir du Roure
27. Marie d'Albert de Luynes
3. Madeleine de Créquy
28. Artus of Saint-Gelais, Marquis of Lansac, seigneur of Azay-le-Rideau
14. Gilles de Saint Gelais, marquis de Lansac, marquis de Ballon
29. Françoise de Souvré, governess of Louis XIV
7. Armande de St.Gelais-Lansac
30. Gabriel de la Vallée des Fossés, marquis d'Everly
15. Marie de la Vallee-Fossez, marquise d'Everly
31. Madeleine du Val de Fontenay

Charles Louis Bretagne de La Trémoille, 6th Duke of Thouars House of La Trémoille Born: 15 March 1683 Died: 9 October 1719
French nobility
Preceded by Charles Belgique Hollande de La Trémoille	Duc de Thouars; 1 June 1709 – 9 October 1719	Succeeded by Charles Armand René de La Trémoille
