= Duke of Albret =

Duke of Albret (Duc d'Albret) was a title in the French nobility.

It was created in 1550 for the King of Navarre, Henry II. He died in 1555 and was succeeded by his daughter, Jeanne III. The duchy was made into a peerage for her in 1556. On her death in 1572 the title was inherited by her son Henry; he became King of France as Henry IV in 1589 when the title merged in the Crown. He bestowed it on his sister, Catherine de Bourbon, the regent of Navarre.

Between 1641 and 1651 the duchy-peerage was held by the Princes of Condé, Henri (died 1646) and his son Louis. In 1651 the duchy-peerage was granted to the Duke of Bouillon, Frédéric Maurice de La Tour d'Auvergne, and was held by subsequent Dukes of Bouillon until becoming extinct in 1802.

In the nineteenth century Duke of Albret was a courtesy title borne by Prince Henri d'Orléans, duc d'Aumale (1822–1897), the heir to the Condé estates.

== List of dukes ==
=== First creation ===
- Henry II of Navarre (1550–55), Comte de Foix, Duc d'Albret (1550) and King of Navarre

=== Second creation ===
- Jeanne d'Albret (1556–72)
- Henry III and IV (1572-1589)

=== Third creation ===
- Catherine de Bourbon (1589-1604)

=== Fourth creation ===
- Henri, Prince of Condé (1641–46)
- Louis, Grand Condé (1646–51)
- Frédéric Maurice de La Tour d'Auvergne (1651–52)
- Godefroy Maurice de La Tour d'Auvergne (1652–96)
- Emmanuel Théodose de La Tour d'Auvergne (1696–1730)
- Charles Godefroy de La Tour d'Auvergne (1730–71)
- Godefroy Charles Henri de La Tour d'Auvergne (1771–92)
