= Marie Mancini =

Mistress of Louis XIV (1639–1715)

- Princess of Paliano
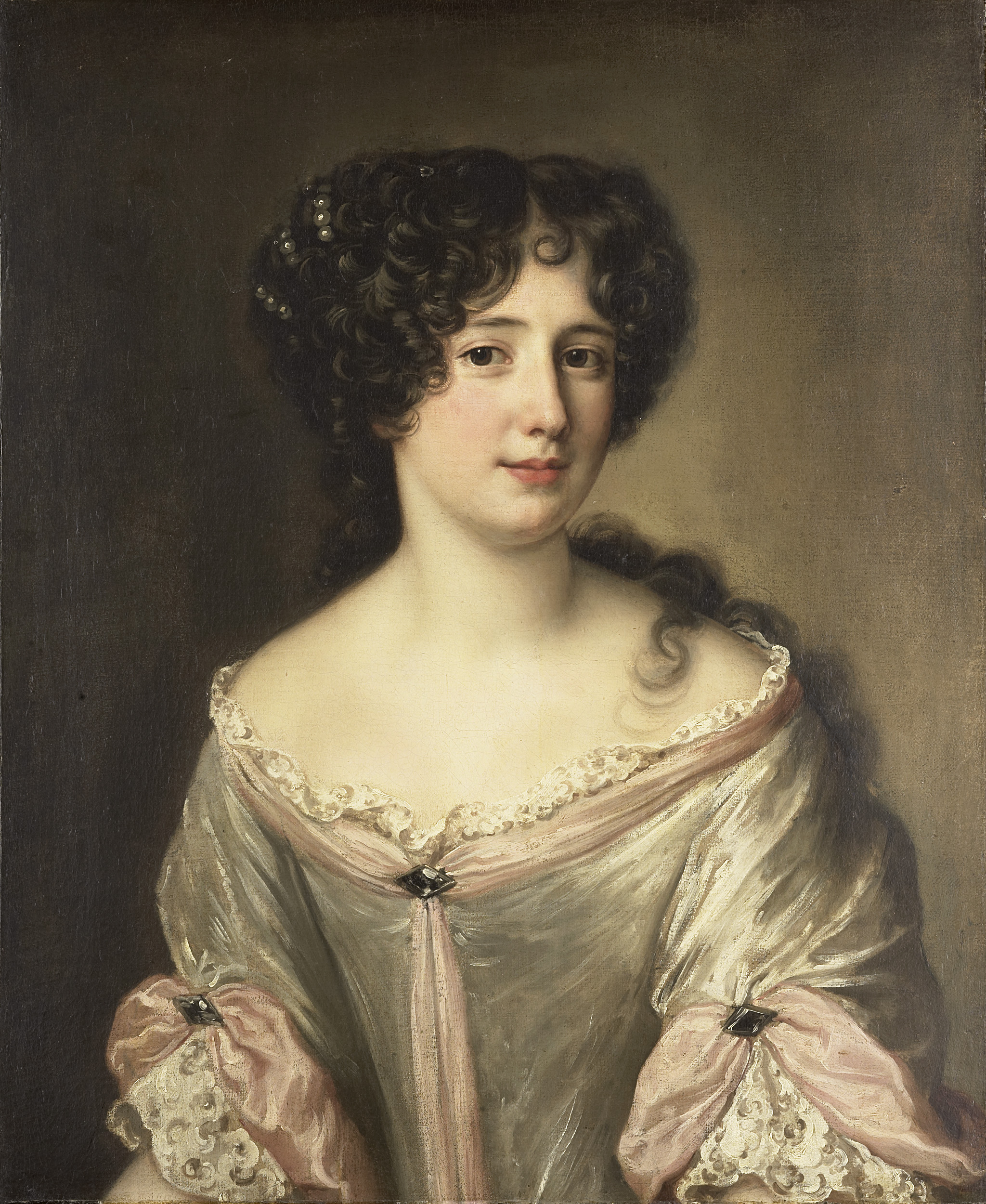
- Mancini by Jacob Ferdinand Voet, Rijksmuseum.
- Full name: Anna Maria Mancini
- Born: 28 August 1639; Rome, Papal States
- Died: 8 May 1715 (aged 75); Pisa
- Spouse: Lorenzo Onofrio Colonna, 8th Prince of Paliano (m. 1661; dead 1689)
- Issue: Filippo, 9th Prince of Paliano; Marcantonio Colonna; Carlo Colonna
- Father: Lorenzo Mancini
- Mother: Girolama Mazzarini

Anna Maria "Marie" Mancini, Princess of Paliano (28 August 1639 – 8 May 1715) was the third of the five Mancini sisters, nieces to Cardinal Mazarin who were brought to France to marry advantageously. Along with two of their female Martinozzi cousins, the Mancini sisters were known at the court of King Louis XIV as the Mazarinettes. Marie is an ancestor of King Philippe of the Belgians through his mother Queen Paola.

== Early life and family ==
Mancini was born on 28 August 1639 and grew up in Rome. Her father was Baron Lorenzo Mancini, an Italian aristocrat who was also a necromancer and astrologer. After his death in 1650, her mother, Geronima Mazzarini, brought her daughters from Rome to Paris in the hope of using the influence of her brother, Cardinal Mazarin, to gain them advantageous marriages.

The other Mancini sisters were:

- Laure (1636 - 1657), the eldest, who married Louis de Bourbon, duc de Vendôme, the grandson of King Henry IV and his mistress, Gabrielle d'Estrées, and became the mother of the famous French general Louis Joseph de Bourbon, duc de Vendôme,
- Olympe (1638 - 1708), who married Eugène-Maurice of Savoy-Carignano and became the mother of the famous Austrian general Prince Eugene of Savoy,
- Hortense (1646 - 1699), the beauty of the family, escaped her abusive husband, Armand-Charles de la Porte, duc de La Meilleraye, and went to London, where she became the mistress of King Charles II.
- Marie Anne (1649 - 1714) married Maurice Godefroy de la Tour d'Auvergne, duc de Bouillon, a nephew of the famous field marshal Turenne.

The Mancinis were not the only female family members that Cardinal Mazarin brought to the French court. The others were Marie's first cousins, daughters of Mazarin's eldest sister. The elder, Laura Martinozzi, married Alfonso IV d'Este, duke of Modena and was the mother of Mary of Modena, second wife of James II of England. The younger, Anne Marie Martinozzi, married Armand, Prince de Conti.

The Mancini also had three brothers: Paul, Philippe, and Alphonse.

== Youth ==
In France, Anna Maria's name was gallicized to Marie. "Dark, vivacious and beautiful," Marie captured the biggest prize of the French court: the romantic love of Louis XIV. According to Antonia Fraser's biography Love and Louis XIV, Marie's mother, Geronima, was told by a horoscope that Marie would cause trouble and demanded on her deathbed that Cardinal Mazarin should, "shut Marie up in a convent and keep her there."

Marie did not consummate her relationship with the Sun King physically, and was never his mistress. He was genuinely in love with her, and wanted to marry her. Marie Mancini was willing to marry him, but the plans of marriage was in direct opposition to the plans of both the king's mother and Marie's uncle and guardian, the Cardinal. Eventually, Cardinal Mazarin and the young king's mother, Anne of Austria, separated the couple, banishing Marie into exile and arranging for Louis' marriage to his cousin, Maria Theresa of Austria, Infanta of Spain.

The break up was intense. When Louis XIV was made aware of the plans to exile Marie from court, he called the Cardinal Mazarin to him and openly asked him to marry his niece. The Cardinal replied that he had been appointed to his position by the king's parents to see to the welfare of the Kingdom and that he would rather see his niece dead than to be elevated merely because of the king's blind passion; the king went so far as to fall on his knees before the Cardinal, but without success. Next, the king had a conversation with his mother lasting for about an hour, during which she managed to convince him that he must give up love for politics, and the king was observed leaving the conversation with his eyes red with tears. When Marie Mancini left court Louis XIV escorted her to her carriage, during which she was famously to have said:

“Sire, you weep, you love me, and yet you allow me to go!”

== Exile and marriage ==
In 1661, much to her own despair, Marie was sent away to marry an Italian prince, Lorenzo Onofrio Colonna. He apparently remarked after their wedding night that he was surprised to find her still a virgin. The bridegroom had not expected to find "innocence among the loves of kings" (from Antonia Fraser's book Love and Louis XIV).

In the 1670's the king sent Marie to the convent of Sainte Marie de la Visitation in Turin, capital city of the Dukes of Savoy, on her request. However, she eventually left the convent and stayed with the Marquesses of Mortare. Two days later, unexpected visitors arrived: the Nuncio, the Almirante, and the minister of justice Don García de Medrano, representing the royal council and the chamber of Castile, came to persuade her, on behalf of the king, to return to the convent. They asserted that she should not have left without His Majesty's permission, as she had initially entered it under his directive. The Almirante conveyed the king's will, the Nuncio aimed to facilitate its execution, and the minister of justice García de Medrano warned her of potential consequences if she resisted; "he had orders to take me away, and that should I refuse to consent, he would not leave my person and would keep me under very tight guard". Although initially hesitant, the marquess persuaded her to comply, fearing violence if she refused. Reluctantly, she consented, and the marquess accompanied her back to the convent in a royal coach, where she would meet the Duke of Aveiro.

== Issue ==
By her husband, she had three sons:

- Filippo Colonna, 9th Prince of Paliano (7 April 1663 - 6 November 1714). He married firstly Lorenza de la Certa, without issue; and secondly Olimpia Pamphili, with issue, eight children;
- Marcantonio Colonna (born in 1664);
- Carlo Colonna (16 November 1665 - 8 July 1739), cardinal.

== Escape and death ==
After the difficult birth of her third child, Marie refused intimacy with her husband and, as a result, relations between the two deteriorated. On 29 May 1672, fearing that her husband would kill her, Marie left Rome accompanied by her sister Hortense. In 1667 a false memoir began circulating France about Marie, after her sister Hortense had written her own. Marie retorted by penning her own memoir. The Mancini sisters were some of the earliest women in France to publish their own memoirs. She did not return to Italy until her husband's death in 1689 and then spent a further decade travelling Europe.

She died in Pisa in May 1715 aged 75, little over 3 months before the death of Louis XIV in September that year, and is buried in the Church of the Holy Sepulchre there.

== In fiction and literature ==
Marie plays an active role in Letitia Elizabeth Landon's novel, Francesca Carrara, although her life following her encounters with Louis XIV is mainly fictional.

The character of Marie Mancini appears in the French musical Le Roi Soleil, where she was played by Anne-Laure Girbal. Her character appears also in the 2008 Italian novel Secretum by Rita Monaldi and Francesco Sorti and is the main character of the 2015 novel The Enchantress of Paris by Marci Jefferson.

Marie and her sister Hortense Mancini are the subjects of a dual biography, The King's Mistresses: The Liberated Lives of Marie Mancini, Princess Colonna, and Her Sister Hortense, Duchess Mazarin, by Elizabeth C. Goldsmith (2012, PublicAffairs).
