= Emmanuel Théodose de La Tour d'Auvergne (1668–1730) =

Emmanuel Théodose
- Duke of Bouillon
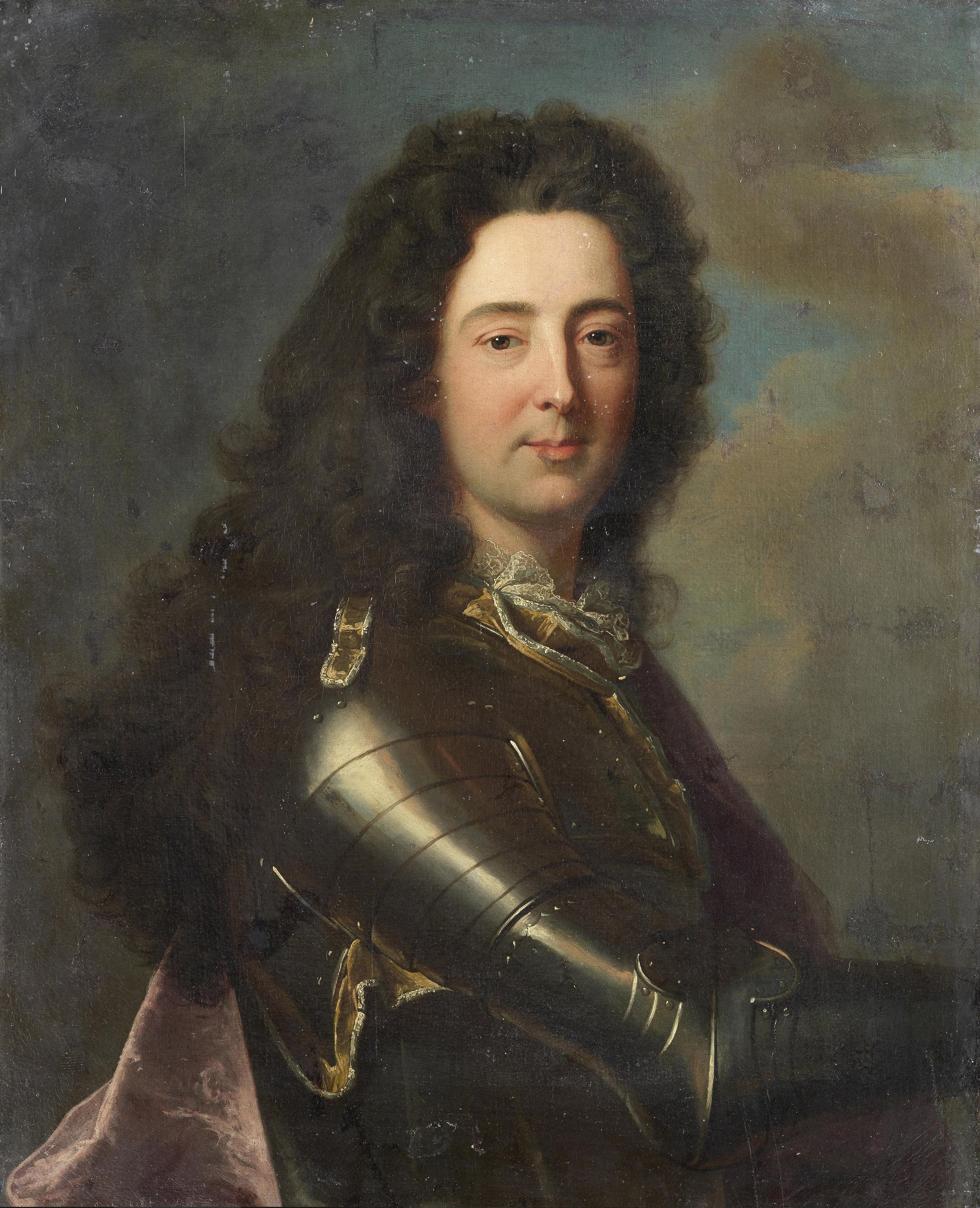
- Emmanuel Théodose while the Duke of Albret
- Born: 1668
- Died: 17 April 1730 (aged 61–62)
- Spouse: Marie Armande de La Trémoille; Louise Françoise Angélique Le Tellier; Anne Marie Christiane de Simiane; Louise Henriette Françoise de Lorraine
- Issue Detail: Armande, Princess of Epinoy; Marie Hortense Victoire, Duchess of Thouars; Charles Godefroy, Duke of Bouillon; Frédéric Maurice Casimir, Prince of Turenne; Godefroy Girault, Duke of Château-Thierry; Anne Marie Louise, Princess of Soubise; Marie Charlotte, Princess of Craon
Names
- Emmanuel Théodose de La Tour d'Auvergne
- House: La Tour d'Auvergne
- Father: Godefroy Maurice de La Tour d'Auvergne
- Mother: Marie Anne Mancini

Emmanuel Théodose de La Tour d'Auvergne (1668 – 17 April 1730) was a French nobleman and ruler of the Sovereign Duchy of Bouillon. He was the son of Godefroy Maurice de La Tour d'Auvergne and his wife Marie Anne Mancini. He married four times and had eleven children.

== Biography ==
Second son of Godefroy Maurice de La Tour d'Auvergne and his wife Marie Anne Mancini, he was styled the Prince of Turenne till he succeeded to the Sovereign Duchy of Bouillon which had been in his family's possession since 1594. His cousins included two famous generals, Louis Joseph, Duke of Vendôme and Prince Eugene of Savoy as well as his paternal cousins like Emmanuel Maurice, Duke of Elbeuf and Henri, Duke of Elbeuf.

His older brother Louis Charles de La Tour d'Auvergne was the Prince of Turenne but died in the Battle of Steenkerque. Prior to being the Prince of Turenne (heir to the duchy of Bouillon) he was the Duke of Albret. He married Marie Armande de La Trémoille on 1 February 1696 in the chapel of the Hôtel de Crequi, Paris.

His second wife Louise Françoise Angélique Le Tellier, was a daughter of Louis François Marie Le Tellier, and as such, a grand daughter of the marquis de Louvois.

Married four times, his third wife Anne Marie Christiane de Simiane, daughter of François de Simiane, Count de Monchadied and Anne-Marie Thérèse de Simiane, Marquise de Gordes, died giving birth to the couples only child. It was thorough that union that he and his wife were ancestors of the murdered Louis Antoine, Duke of Enghien, his grandmother was Charlotte de Rohan, wife of Louis Joseph, Prince of Condé. He succeeded his father as the Grand Chamberlain of France. His uncle was the Cardinal de Bouillon and his great uncle was the famed Vicomte de Turenne.

From his first marriage, three sons were produced, the eldest two dying in infancy. He was succeeded by his third son from his first marriage Charles Godefroy de La Tour d'Auvergne.

== Marriages and children ==
His first wife, Marie Armande Victoire de La Trémouille (1677–1717) was a daughter of Charles Belgique Hollande de La Trémoille and Madeleine de Créquy. They married on 1 February 1696 and had seven children;

1. Armande de La Tour d'Auvergne (28 August 1697 – 13 April 1717) married Louis de Melun, Prince of Epinoy, Duke of Joyeuse (1694–1724)
2. Marie Madeleine de La Tour d'Auvergne (22 October 1698 – 25 September 1699) died in infancy;
3. X de La Tour d'Auvergne (28 December 1699–30 December 1699) died in infancy;
4. Godefroy Maurice de La Tour d'Auvergne, Prince of Turenne (4 May 1701 – 9 January 1705) died in infancy;
5. Frédéric Maurice Casimir de La Tour d'Auvergne, Prince of Turenne (24 October 1702 – 1 October 1723) married Maria Carolina Sobieski, daughter of James Louis Sobieski and sister of Clementina Sobieski; died in an accident at Strassburg; no issue;
6. Marie Hortense Victoire de La Tour d'Auvergne (27 January 1704 – 1741) married Charles Armand René de La Trémoille and had issue;
7. Charles Godefroy de La Tour d'Auvergne, Duke of Bouillon (16 July 1706 – 24 October 1771) married his brother's widow Maria Karolina Sobieski and had issue;

His second marriage was with Louise Françoise Angélique le Tellier (d.1719), a grand daughter of Louvois. The couple married on 4 January 1718 and had a son;

1. Godefroy Girault de La Tour d'Auvergne, Duke of Château-Thierry (2 July 1719 – 29 May 1732) died in infancy;

His third wife was Anne Marie Christiane de Simiane (d.1722) on 26 May 1720. They had a daughter;

1. Anne Marie Louise de La Tour d'Auvergne (1 August 1722 – 19 September 1739) married Charles de Rohan, had one daughter Charlotte de Rohan;

Lastly he married Louise Henriette Françoise de Lorraine (1707–1737), daughter of Anne Marie Joseph de Lorraine and Marie Louise Jeannin de Castille. The couple married on 21 March 1725 and had a daughter;

1. Marie Sophie Charlotte de La Tour d'Auvergne (20 December 1729 – 6 September 1763) married Charles Just de Beauvau, son of Marc de Beauvau, Prince of Craon and had issue.

== Ancestry ==
Ancestors of Emmanuel Théodose de La Tour d'Auvergne (1668–1730)

8. Henri de La Tour d'Auvergne
4. Frédéric Maurice de La Tour d'Auvergne
9. Countess Elisabeth of Nassau
2. Godefroy Maurice de La Tour d'Auvergne
10. Frederik, Count van den Bergh
5. Eleonora Catharina of the Bergh
11. Françoise de Ravenel
1. Emmanuel Théodose de La Tour d'Auvergne
12. Paolo Mancini
6. Lorenzo Mancini
13. Vittoria Capocci
3. Marie Anne Mancini
14. Pietro Mazzarini
7. Girolama Mazzarini
15. Ortensia Bufalini
