= Charles Godefroy de La Tour d'Auvergne =

Charles Godefroy
- Duke of Bouillon
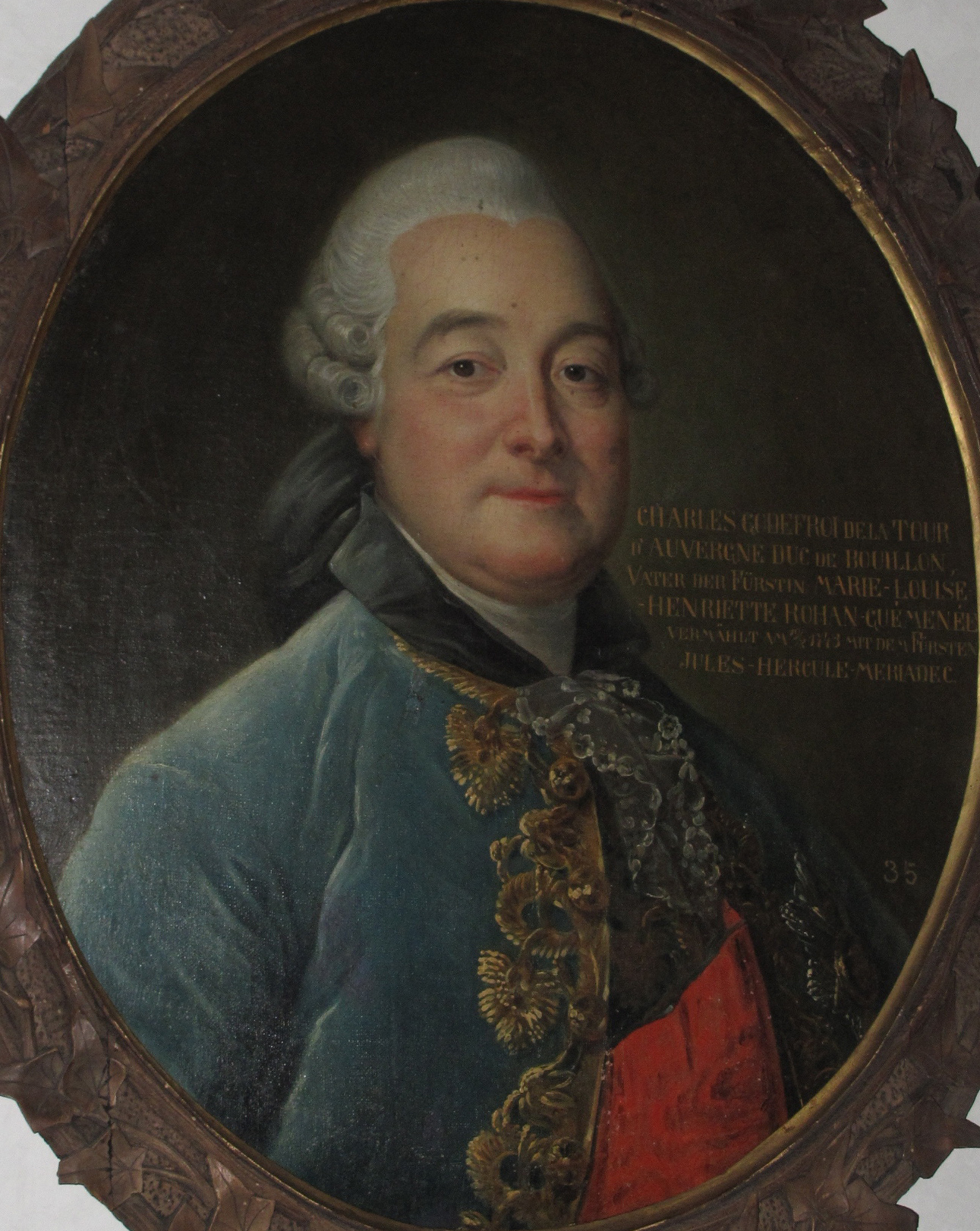
- Born: 16 July 1706; Hôtel de Bouillon, Paris, France
- Died: 24 October 1771 (aged 65); Château de Montalet, France
- Spouse: Maria Karolina Sobieska
- Issue Detail: Marie Louise, Princess of Guéméné; Godefroy Charles Henri, Duke of Bouillon
Names
- Charles Godefroy de La Tour d'Auvergne
- House: La Tour d'Auvergne
- Father: Emmanuel Théodose de La Tour d'Auvergne
- Mother: Marie Armande Victoire de La Trémouille

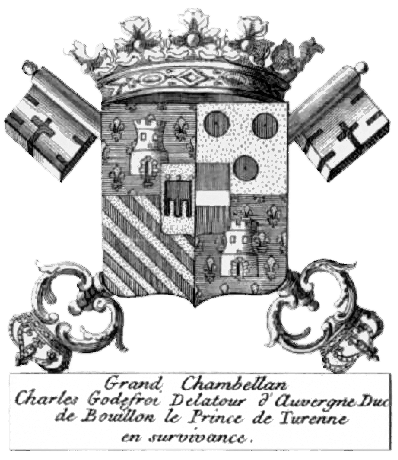
Grand Chambellan

Charles Godefroy de La Tour d'Auvergne (16 July 1706 – 24 October 1771) was a French nobleman and member of the powerful House of La Tour d'Auvergne.

== Biography ==
His parents, Emmanuel Théodose de La Tour d'Auvergne (1668–1730) and Marie Armande Victoire de La Trémoille (1677–1717) were married in 1696 and Charles Godefroy was the youngest of seven children born to the couple.

His mother died in 1717 and his father married again. In total Charles Godefroy would have three half siblings from his fathers other three marriages. As the youngest son, he was not expected to succeed to the Duchy of Bouillon which had been in his families hands since 1594.

His siblings included Armande (1697–1717), Princess of Epinoy (wife of Louis de Melun) his other full sister Marie Hortense Victoire (1704–1741) married Charles Armand René de La Trémoille. His younger half sister Anne Marie Louise married Charles de Rohan, famous general and friend of Louis XV. His youngest sibling, Marie Sophie Charlotte (1729–1763) married the Prince of Craon.

His older brothers Godefroy Maurice (1702–1705) and Frédéric Maurice (1702–1723) died before their father did. His father eventually died in April 1730 and Charles Godefroy then became the sovereign Duke of Bouillon, a small principality in present-day Belgium.

He married his brother's widow, Maria Karolina Sobieska, the granddaughter of John III Sobieski. She was the older sister of Clementina Sobieski, wife of James Francis Edward Stuart. They had two children, a son and a daughter. Their only daughter, Marie Louise Henriette Jeanne de La Tour d'Auvergne, was a famous adventuress, guillotined in 1793.

He started an affair with his step mother, the notably attractive Louise Henriette Françoise de Lorraine. He was a year older than she.

== Issue ==
- Marie Louise Henriette Jeanne de La Tour d'Auvergne (15 August 1725 –24 September 1781) married the Prince of Guéméné and had issue; had a secret child with her cousin Charles Edward Stuart;
- Godefroy Charles Henri de La Tour d'Auvergne (26 January 1728 – 3 December 1792) married Louise Henriette Gabrielle de Lorraine and had issue, she was a grand daughter of Charles de Lorraine, Count of Marsan.

== Sources ==
- Marek, Miroslav. "Genealogy of the House of La Tour d'Auvergne". Genealogy.EU.
- Account of the Duchy of Bouillon by François Velde
