= Hôtel de Chimay =

Coordinates: 48.8579°N 2.3339°E

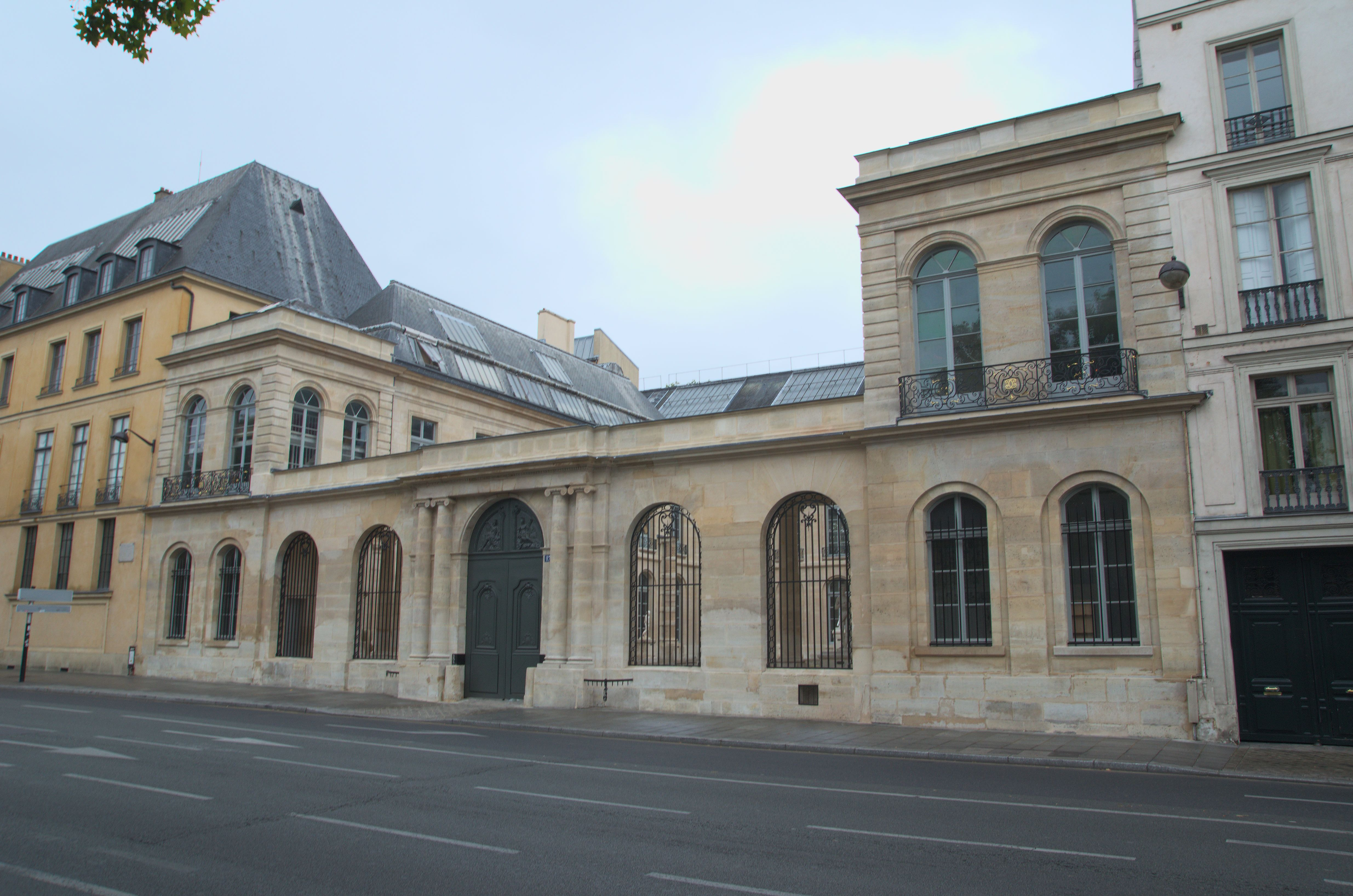
- Entrance from quai Malaquais (2009)
- Interactive map of the Hôtel de Chimay area

General information
- Location: Paris, France

The Hôtel de Chimay (French pronunciation: [otɛl də ʃimɛ]), originally the Hôtel de La Bazinière ([la bazinjɛʁ]), is a hôtel particulier, a type of large townhouse of France, built in 1635 on a site that is now at 17 quai Malaquais in the 6th arrondissement of Paris. Since 1883, it has been an extension of the École nationale supérieure des Beaux-Arts, a distinguished National School of Fine Arts.

== History ==
The Quai Malaquais in Paris was constructed around 1552. The purpose of it was to protect the Pré-aux-Clercs area from floods which it was prone to. From 1585, it was given the name Malaquais.

=== Hôtel de La Bazinière ===
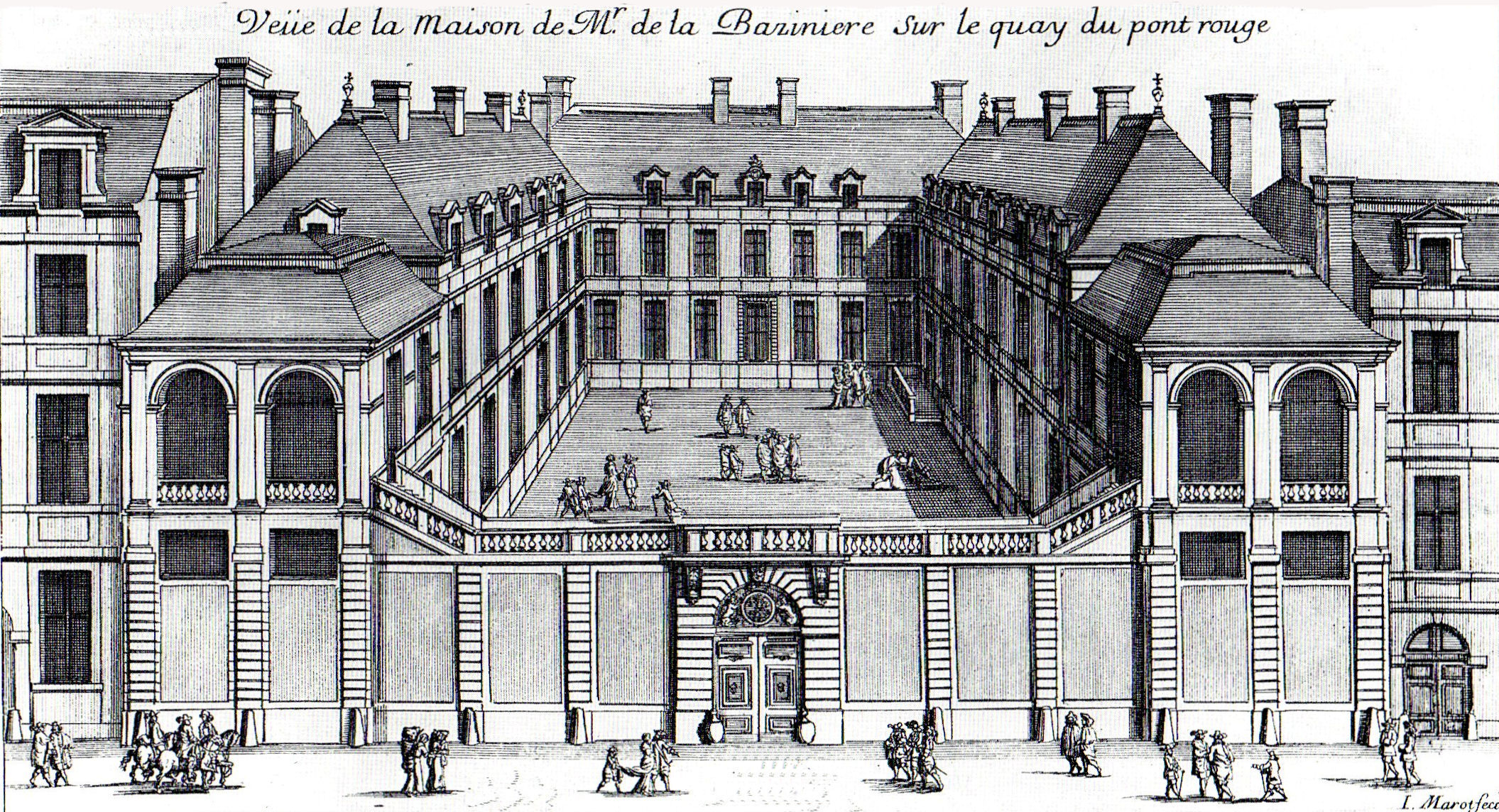
The Hôtel de La Bazinière as engraved by Jean Marot in 1658

This hôtel was constructed in 1635 by the entrepreneurs Simon Delespine (d.1680), Martial Baret and Jean Péronne for Macé I Bertrand de La Bazinière, a royal treasurer.

Between 1653 and 1658, the hôtel was modified to the designs of the famous François Mansart. Some of the interior work was carried out by Charles Le Brun, then the protégé of Nicolas Fouquet. It was around 1658, that the building was the subject of an engraving by the architect Jean Marot.

During 1665, the hôtel was the home of Henrietta Maria of France, former queen consort of England, Scotland and Ireland, Queen Mother of England, Scotland and Ireland, widow of Charles I, mother of Charles II and James II, sister of Louis XIII, aunt of Louis XIV and mother of the Duchess of Orléans. She later moved out to the Château de Colombes where she died in 1669.

=== Hôtel de Bouillon ===
In 1681, the hôtel was purchased by Godefroy Maurice de La Tour d'Auvergne, the Duke of Bouillon. His wife, Marie Anne Mancini (niece of Cardinal Mazarin) hosted a famous salon there. She died in the hôtel in 1714, having lived there since the Duke of Bouillon had bought it. Jean de La Fontaine, a friend of the duchesse de Bouillon, was a visitor. Other famous people of the time that went were Madame de Sévigné, Madame de La Fayette, Pierre Corneille and Molière.

During her residence, Marie Anne had Charles Le Brun and André Le Nôtre embellish the house according to her tastes. Her older son, Emmanuel Théodose lived here and several of his children were born here, such as the future Duke of Bouillon Charles Godefroy de La Tour d'Auvergne, Anne Marie Louise, the Princess of Soubise and his youngest child, the future Princess of Craon.

In 1725, the famous adventuress Marie Louise de La Tour d'Auvergne was born here.

The Duke's son and successor Charles Godefroy de La Tour d'Auvergne had the building remodelled between 1741 and 1744 by the architect François Debias-Aubry.

During the revolution, it was confiscated from the La Tour d'Auvergnes and given to the state. Their Duchy of Bouillon was also taken but later given back.

=== Hôtel de La Pagerie ===
During the First Empire, Napoleon I gave the hôtel to Stéphanie Tascher de La Pagerie (1788–1832), the cousin of Empress Joséphine. Stéphanie was given the hôtel on 1 February 1808, after her marriage to Prosper Louis, Duke of Arenberg. The décor was redesigned in the fashionable Empire style.

=== Hôtel de Chimay ===
Sold in 1852, the property was bought by Joseph de Riquet de Caraman (1808-1886), the prince de Chimay from which its present name is derived. Since 1883, the building has been an extension of the École nationale supérieure des Beaux-Arts, which was set up in 1648 by Charles Le Brun as the Académie de peinture et de sculpture.

== Bibliography ==
- Alexandre Gady - Les hôtels particuliers de Paris, du Moyen Âge à la Belle Époque - Parigramme - 2008 - ISBN 978-2-84096-213-7
- Dominique Leborgne - Promenades d'architecture et d'histoire. Saint-Germain-des-Près. Évolution d'un paysage urbain - Parigramme - 2005 - ISBN 2-84096-189-X
