= Beaulieu-sous-Parthenay =

- Commune
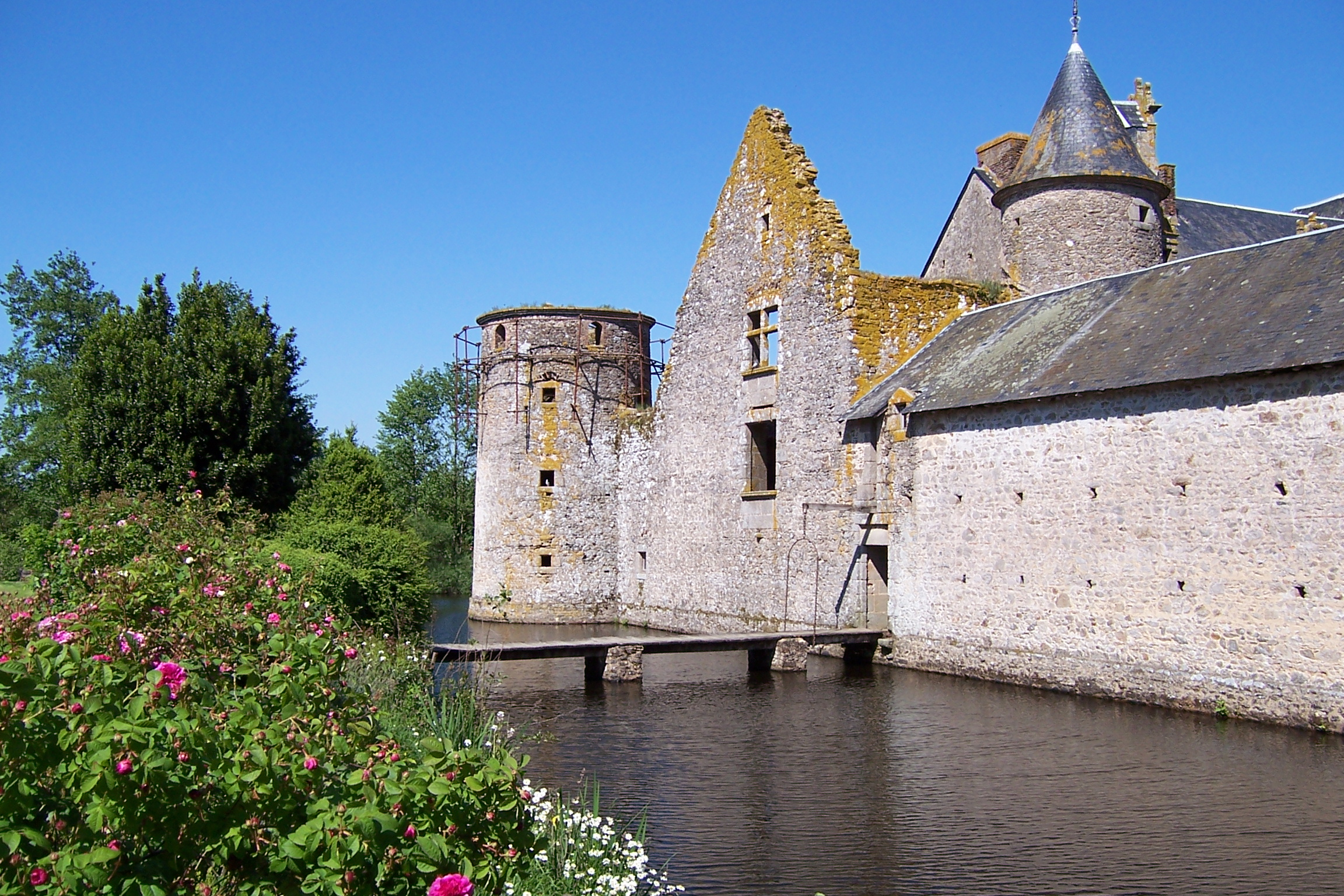
- The château in Beaulieu sous Parthenay
- Location of Beaulieu-sous-Parthenay
- Location within France Location within Nouvelle-Aquitaine
- Coordinates: 46°34′36″N 0°14′00″W
- Country: France
- Region: Nouvelle-Aquitaine
- Department: Deux-Sèvres
- Arrondissement: Parthenay
- Canton: La Gâtine

Government
  - Mayor (2020–2026): Francine Chausseray
- Area^{1}: 26.72 km^{2} (10.32 sq mi)
- Elevation: 257 m (843 ft)
- Highest elevation: 228 m (748 ft)
- Lowest elevation: 143 m (469 ft)
- Population (2023): 680
  - Density: 25/km^{2} (66/sq mi)
- Time zone: UTC+01:00 (CET)
  - Summer (DST): UTC+02:00 (CEST)
- INSEE/Postal code: 79029 /79420
- ^{1} French Land Register data, which excludes lakes, ponds, glaciers > 1 km^{2} (0.386 sq mi or 247 acres) and river estuaries.

Beaulieu-sous-Parthenay (French pronunciation: [boljø su paʁtənɛ], literally Beaulieu under Parthenay) is a commune in the Deux-Sèvres department in the Nouvelle-Aquitaine region in western France.

== See also ==
- Communes of the Deux-Sèvres department
