= Cardinal de Bouillon =

French prelate

His Eminence Emmanuel Théodose
- Bishop of Ostia-Velletri; Cardinal-Bishop of Ostia e Velletri; Duke of Albret
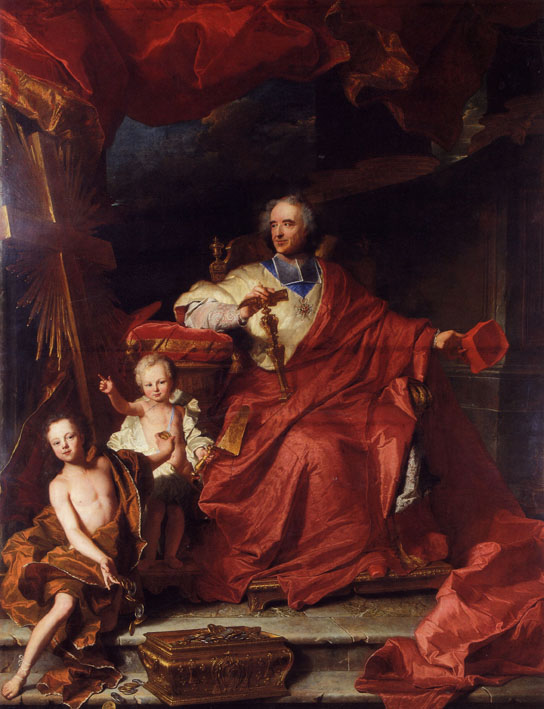
- Portrait by Hyacinthe Rigaud
- See: Ostia-Velletri
- Appointed: 15 December 1700
- Term ended: 2 March 1715
- Predecessor: Alderano Cibo
- Successor: Nicolò Acciaioli
- Previous posts: Cardinal-Priest of San Lorenzo in Panisperna (1670–1676); Cardinal-Priest of San Pietro in Vincoli (1676–1689); Bishop of Albano (1689–1698); Cardinal-Bishop of Albano (1689–1698); Bishop of Porto e Santa Rufina (1698–1700); Cardinal-Bishop of Porto e Santa Rufina (1698–1700)

Orders
- Consecration: 20 November 1689 by Flavio Chigi
- Created cardinal: 5 August 1669 by Clement IX
- Rank: Cardinal-Bishop

Personal details
- Born: Emmanuel Théodose de La Tour d'Auvergne; 26 August 1643 Château de Turenne, France
- Died: 2 March 1715 (aged 71) Rome
- Denomination: Catholic
- Parents: Frédéric Maurice de La Tour d'Auvergne; Eleonora Catharina of the Bergh
- Coat of arms

Emmanuel-Théodose de La Tour d'Auvergne, cardinal de Bouillon (24 August 1643 – 2 March 1715, Rome) was a French prelate and diplomat.

== Biography ==
Originally known as the Duc d'Albret, he was the son of Frédéric Maurice de La Tour d'Auvergne, Duc de Bouillon and his wife Éléonor de Bergh. He was the nephew of Maréchal de Turenne. As a member of the House of La Tour d'Auvergne, he claimed to be a Foreign Prince.

In 1658, he was appointed a canon of Liège; in 1667 doctor of the Sorbonne. He played some part in Turenne's conversion to Catholicism in 1668 and had an important rôle as intermediary between his uncle and Louis XIV. Created a cardinal in 1669, at the early age of twenty-four, he was provided with several rich benefices. In particular he was made Grand Almoner of France in 1671 and became Supreme Abbot of the Cluniac Order in 1683. On 19 Oct 1689, he was appointed as Cardinal-Bishop of Albano and consecrated on 20 Nov 1689 by Flavio Chigi, Cardinal-Bishop of Porto e Santa Rufina, with Giambattista Rubini, Bishop of Vicenza, and Francesco Juste Giusti, Bishop of Nepi e Sutri, serving as co-consecrators.

His brother Godefroy Maurice de La Tour d'Auvergne was the next Duke of Bouillon. His oldest sister Élisabeth, married Charles III, Duke of Elbeuf, son of Charles II, Duke of Elbeuf and Catherine Henriette de Bourbon.

Louvois, the powerful minister of Louis XIV, inspired by enmity to the house of Turenne, successfully opposed certain of his demands on the king for the benefit of members of his family, and the cardinal's disappointment vented itself in a bitter satire on his royal master. This was used to effect Bouillon's downfall at court.

He carried out the nuptials between Philippe d'Orléans, Duke of Chartres and Françoise-Marie de Bourbon, Mademoiselle de Blois at Versailles on 18 February 1692. Mademoiselle de Blois was an illegitimate daughter of Louis XIV and Madame de Montespan. Bouillon had previously refused to take part in the marriage of Louise-Françoise de Bourbon, Mademoiselle de Nantes (sister of Mademoiselle de Blois) to the Duke of Bourbon in 1685 and was subsequently exiled then recalled to perform the formal ceremony.

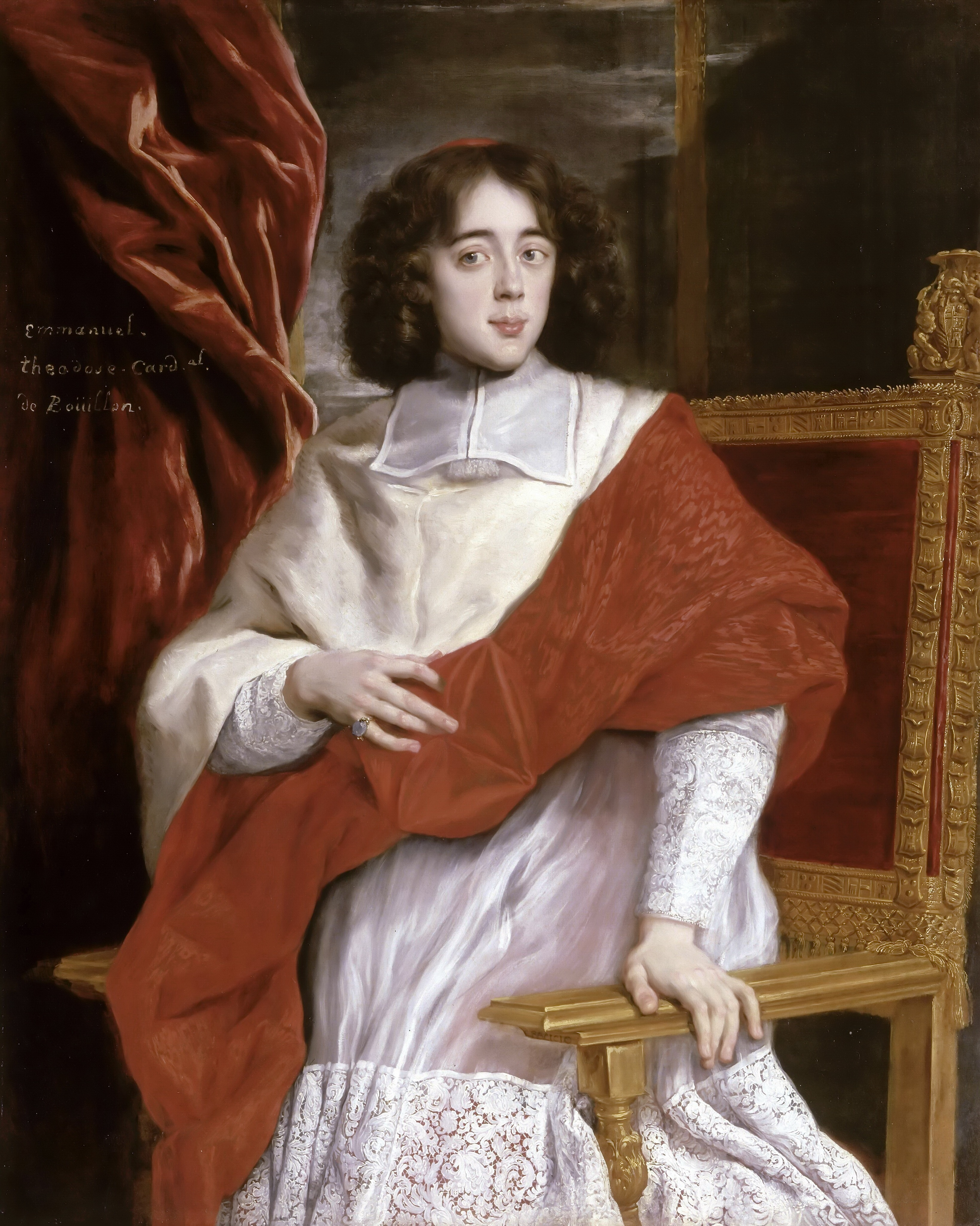
The young Bouillon as a Cardinal Painting by Giovanni Battista Gaulli

The cardinal then put forth great efforts to obtain the vacant Prince-Bishopric of Liège, but could not overcome the opposition of Louvois, who secured the dignity for Clement Joseph of Bavaria. He eventually regained the royal favour and was sent as ambassador to Rome. While there, Bouillon employed the sculptor Pierre Le Gros to carve the main components of the tomb he planned to erect for his parents at the Abbey of Cluny (the sculptures were finished by 1707 and arrived at Cluny in 1709). Contrary to the wishes of his king, he championed the cause of Fénelon against that of Bossuet and did all he could to prevent the condemnation of Fénelon's Explication des maximes des Saints.

He was recalled to France, but he hesitated to obey the Royal order since he was next in line for the office of Dean of the Sacred College and consequently Bishop of Ostia (his presence at the time of the imminent death of the current dean was required to secure his succession). The death of the pope and the subsequent conclave further delayed departure and Bouillon's property in France was then seized. When he eventually submitted and returned to France, he was first exiled to his Abbey of Tournus, soon given a little more freedom of movement, but forbidden to enter Paris. This prevented him from defending himself against the monks of Cluny who sought a parliament ruling against Bouillon's rule over them.

With similar motives in mind as for his tomb project in Cluny, i.e. as contributing factors to a grander scheme of establishing his family as sovereign princes, the cardinal employed Étienne Baluze to compose an Histoire généalogique de la maison d'Auvergne (1708, 2 vols. in fol.), partly based on falsifications. After losing his appeal to uphold his rule over the Cluniac monks in 1710, Bouillon wrote a deeply insulting letter to the king and fled to Prince Eugene of Savoy in the Low Countries.

A warrant for his arrest was issued by the Royal Parliament, and his possessions again confiscated. Only now, because of the dynastic pretensions expressed in them, Baluze's Histoire was banned and the building of the tomb at Cluny prevented.

Bouillon soon went to take up his residence at Rome, where he spent his last days as a guest of the Jesuits in the Jesuit novitiate at Sant'Andrea al Quirinale, where he was eventually buried.

While bishop, he was the principal consecrator of:

- Uldericus Nardi, Bishop of Bagnoregio (1698);
- Giulio Dalla Rosa, Bishop of Borgo San Donnino (1698); and
- Giovanni Francesco Albani, Pope of Rome (1700).

== Notes ==
Catholic Church titles
Preceded by Henri Bertrand de Beuvron	Abbot of Cluny; 1683–1713	Succeeded by Henri-Oswald de la Tour d'Auvergne
Preceded by Alderano Cybo	Dean of the College of Cardinals; 1700	Succeeded by Nicolò Acciaioli
