= Princess Emilie of Hesse-Kassel =

German princess of the House of Hesse-Kassel (1626–1693)

Emilie of Hesse-Kassel
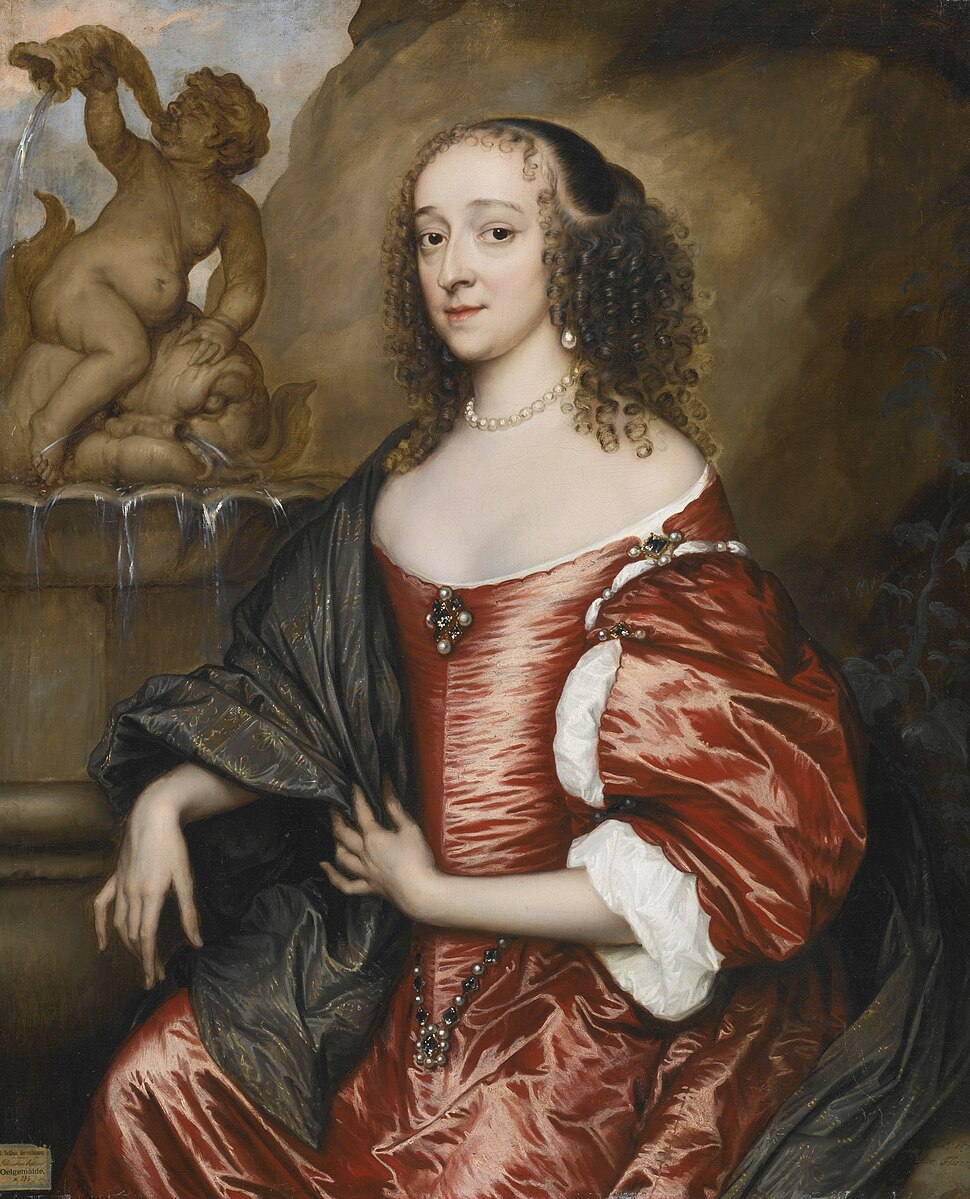
- Princess Emilie of Hesse-Kassel in 1656 by Adriaen Hanneman
- Born: 11 February 1626; Bad Hersfeld, Germany
- Died: 15 March 1693 (aged 67); Heidelberg Castle, Heidelberg, Germany
- Spouse: Henri Charles de La Trémoille, 4th Duke of Thouars
- House: Hesse-Kassel
- Father: William V, Landgrave of Hesse-Kassel
- Mother: Amalie Elisabeth of Hanau-Münzenberg
- Religion: Roman Catholicism prev. Calvinism

Emilie of Hesse-Kassel (11 February 1626 – 15 February 1693), was a German princess of the House of Hesse-Kassel and by marriage, in 1648, Duchess of Thouars. She was the sister of Charlotte of Hesse-Kassel, Electress Palatine and aunt of The Duchess of Orléans who she was with at the French court.
