= Louis, Duke of Joyeuse (1694–1724) =

French nobleman

Louis
- Prince of Epinoy; Duke of Joyeuse
- Full name: Louis de Melun
- Born: October 1694; Paris, France
- Died: 31 July 1724 (aged 29–30)
- Noble family: Melun
- Spouses: Armande de La Tour d'Auvergne (m. 1716; died 1717) Marie Anne de Bourbon (m. 1719)
- Father: Louis de Melun
- Mother: Élisabeth Thérèse de Lorraine

Louis de Melun, Duke of Joyeuse (October 1694 – 31 July 1724) was a French nobleman. He was the Prince of Epinoy, Baron then Duke of Joyeuse (1714) and Peer of France, Baron of Cysoing, Antoing and Wiers, Earl of Saint-Pol, Viscount of Gand, châtelain de Bapaume, Lord of Villemareuil, of Vaucourtois and of Saint-Jean-les-Deux-Jumeaux.

== Biography ==
Louis was the only son born to his parents. His sister Anne Julie Adélaïde de Melun was born in 1698 and was an ancestor of the future maréchal de Soubise, princesse de Condé Madame de Guéméné and the executed duc d'Enghien.

His father died in 1704 of smallpox making the infant Louis the Prince of Epinoy. Ten years later he was also made ducal-peer of Joyeuse.

On 23 February 1716 he married Armande de La Tour d'Auvergne, daughter of Emmanuel Théodose de La Tour d'Auvergne and a grand daughter of the famous Marie Anne Mancini.

After being widowed in 1717, it was well known that he also contracted a secret marriage to Marie Anne de Bourbon in 1719. Marie Anne, known as Mademoiselle de Clermont was a daughter of Louis de Bourbon and Louise Françoise de Bourbon who was in turn an illegitimate daughter of Louis XIV and Madame de Montespan. Marie Anne was also the head of the future Queen's household.

Louis died in 1724, during a hunting party at Marie Anne's ancestral home, the Château de Chantilly. Naturally distraught, Marie Anne never married again. She was never to have any children.

As Louis had no children with Armande either, the county of Saint-Pol, as well as the principality of Joyeuse went to his eldest nephew, the young Duke of Rohan, who was a son of his sister Anne Julie.

== Ancestry ==
Ancestors of Louis, Duke of Joyeuse (1694–1724)

16. Pierre de Melun, Prince of Epinoy
8. Guillaume de Melun, Prince of Epinoy
17. Hippolyte de Montmorency
4. Alexandre Guillaume de Melun, Prince of Epinoy
18. Charles d'Arenberg, Prince of Arenberg, Duke of Aerschot
9. Princesse Ernestine d'Arenberg
19. Anne de Croÿ, Duchess of Aerschot & Croÿ; Daughter of Philipe de Croÿ, Duke of Aerschot
2. Louis de Melun
20. Charles Chabot, Lord of Sainte-Aulaye
10. Henri Chabot, Duke of Rohan
21. Henriette de Lur
5. Jeanne Pélagie de Rohan-Chabot, Lady of Montlieu
22. Henri, Duke of Rohan
11. Marguerite de Rohan
23. Marguerite de Béthune
1. Louis (II) de Melun
24. Charles I, Duke of Elbeuf
12. Charles II, Duke of Elbeuf
25. Marguerite de Chabot
6. François Marie de Lorraine, Prince of Lillebonne
26. Henry IV of France
13. Catherine Henriette de Bourbon, Légitimée de France
27. Gabrielle d'Estrées
3. Élisabeth Thérèse de Lorraine, Princess of Lillebonne
28. Francis II, Duke of Lorraine
14. Charles IV, Duke of Lorraine
29. Christina of Salm
7. Anne de Lorraine
30. Claude François de Cusance, Baron of Belvoir
15. Béatrix de Cusance
31. Ernestine de Witthem, Countess of Walhain

== Sources ==
- M.-Fr. Dantine, Ch. Clémencet et al., L'art de vérifier les dates..., vol. 12, impr. Valade, 1818 (réimpr. 4e), p. 413
- de la Chenaye-Desbois, Dictionnaire de la noblesse, contenant les généalogies, l'histoire..., vol. X, impr. Antoine Boudet, Paris, 1775 (réimpr. 2e), p. 22
