= Godefroy Maurice de La Tour d'Auvergne, Duke of Bouillon =

Godefroy Maurice
- Duke of Bouillon
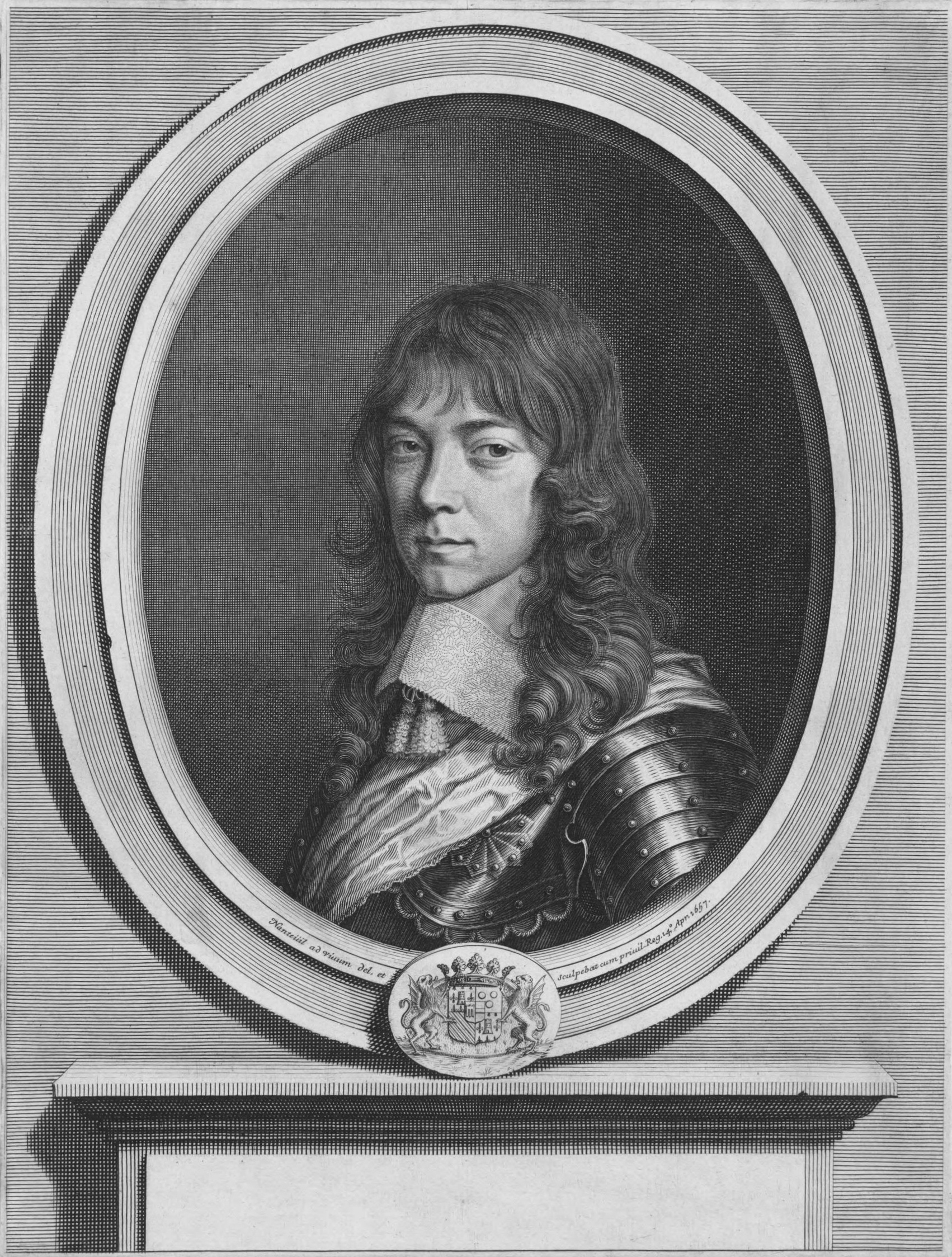
- Godefroy Maurice in 1657
- Born: 21 June 1636
- Died: 26 July 1721 (aged 85); Hôtel de Bouillon, Paris, France
- Spouse: Marie Anne Mancini
- Issue Detail: Louis Charles, Prince of Turenne; Emmanuel Theodose, Duke of Bouillon; Frédéric Jules, Prince of Auvergne; Louis Henri, Count of Évreux; Louise Julie, Princess of Montbazon
Names
- Godefroy Maurice de La Tour d'Auvergne
- House: La Tour d'Auvergne
- Father: Frédéric Maurice de La Tour d'Auvergne
- Mother: Eleonora Catharina of the Bergh

Godefroy Maurice de La Tour d'Auvergne, Duke of Bouillon (21 June 1636 – 26 July 1721) was a French nobleman and member of the House of La Tour d'Auvergne, one of the most important families in France at the time. He married Marie Anne Mancini, niece of Cardinal Mazarin and had seven children.

== Biography ==
Son of Frédéric Maurice de La Tour d'Auvergne and Eleonora Catharina Febronis, Countess of the Bergh, he was the second of eleven children. His older sister Élisabeth (1635–1680) married Charles III, Duke of Elbeuf

He was married to Marie Anne Mancini, the youngest niece of Cardinal Mazarin and one of the Mazarinettes. Her four famous sisters were:

- Laure (1636–1657), the eldest, who married Louis de Bourbon, Duke of Vendôme, grandson of King Henri IV and his mistress, Gabrielle d'Estrées, and became the mother of the famous French general Louis Joseph, Duke of Vendôme,
- Olympe (1638–1708), who married Eugene Maurice, Count of Soissons and became the mother of the famous Austrian general Prince Eugene of Savoy,
- Marie (1639–1715), the third sister, was considered the least beautiful of the sisters but was the one who snagged the biggest prize of all: Louis XIV. The young king was so besotted with her that he wanted to marry her. In the end, he was made to give her up, and she married Prince Lorenzo Colonna who remarked that he was surprised to find her a virgin as one does not expect to find 'innocence among the loves of kings'. (from Antonia Fraser's book Love and Louis XIV)
- Hortense (1646–1699), the beauty of the family, who escaped from her abusive husband, Armand-Charles de la Porte, duc de La Meilleraye, and went to London, where she became the mistress of King Charles II.

One of Marie Anne's brothers was Philippe Jules Mancini, a lover of Philippe de France, brother of Louis XIV. Marie Anne's uncle died when she was thirteen. The night before the cardinal's death, the famous field marshal Turenne came to his bedside to ask for the hand of Marie Anne in the name of his nephew, the young Godefroy Maurice, Duke of Bouillon.

The couple were married in the presence of the royal family at the Louvre Palace in Paris on 19 April 1662. The marriage produced seven children, three of which would go on to produce children. His wife raised her nephew Louis Joseph de Bourbon, the orphan son of Laure Mancini and Louis de Bourbon.

His wife established a small salon at her new residence, the Hôtel de Bouillon, which he bought in 1681. He outlived his wife by some seven years. He was succeeded by his son Emmanuel Theodose as the Duke of Bouillon.

== Issue ==
- Louis Charles de La Tour d'Auvergne, Prince of Turenne (14 January 1665–4 August 1692) died at Enghien after the Battle of Steenkerque, married Anne Geneviève de Lévis, daughter of Madame de Ventadour, no issue;
- Marie Élisabeth de La Tour d'Auvergne, Mademoiselle de Bouillon (8 July 1666–24 December 1725) never married;
- Emmanuel Theodose de La Tour d'Auvergne, Duke of Bouillon (1668–17 April 1730) married firstly to Marie Armande Victoire de La Trémouille (1677–1717) had issue; married Louise Françoise Angélique Le Tellier (grand daughter of Louvois) had issue; married Anne Marie Christiane de Simiane (d.1722) had issue; married Louise Henriette Françoise de Lorraine (daughter of the Count of Harcourt) and had issue;
- Eugene Maurice de La Tour d'Auvergne, Prince of Château-Thierry (29 March 1669–23 November 1672) never married;
- Frédéric Jules de La Tour d'Auvergne, Prince of Auvergne (2 May 1672–1733) married Olive Catherine de Trantes and had issue;
- Louis Henri de La Tour d'Auvergne, Count of Évreux (2 August 1674–23 January 1753) married Marie Anne Crozat, daughter of Antoine Crozat, no issue;
- Louise Julie de La Tour d'Auvergne, Mademoiselle de Château-Thierry (26 November 1679–21 November 1750) married François Armand, Prince of Guéméné and had a child who died aged 3.

=== Unions with the La Trémoille family ===
- His oldest son Emmanuel Théodose (1668–1730) married Marie Armande Victoire de la Trémoïlle (1677–1717), daughter of Charles Belgique Hollande de La Trémoille.

Emmanuel Théodose and Marie Armande Victoire were the parents of:

- Marie Hortense Victoire de La Tour d'Auvergne (1704–1741) who married her first cousin Charles Armand René de La Trémoille.

Previous alliances between the La Tour d'Auvergne and La Trémoille family included the following marriages:

- Claude de La Trémoille (1566–1604) with Countess Charlotte Brabantina of Nassau (1580–1631), the sister of Countess Elisabeth of Nassau, the wife of Henri de La Tour d'Auvergne, Duke of Bouillon
- Henri de La Trémoille (1598–1674) with his aunt Marie de La Tour d'Auvergne (1601–1665)
