= Marie Anne Mancini =

Duchess of Bouillon (1649–1714)

Marie Anne
- Duchess of Bouillon
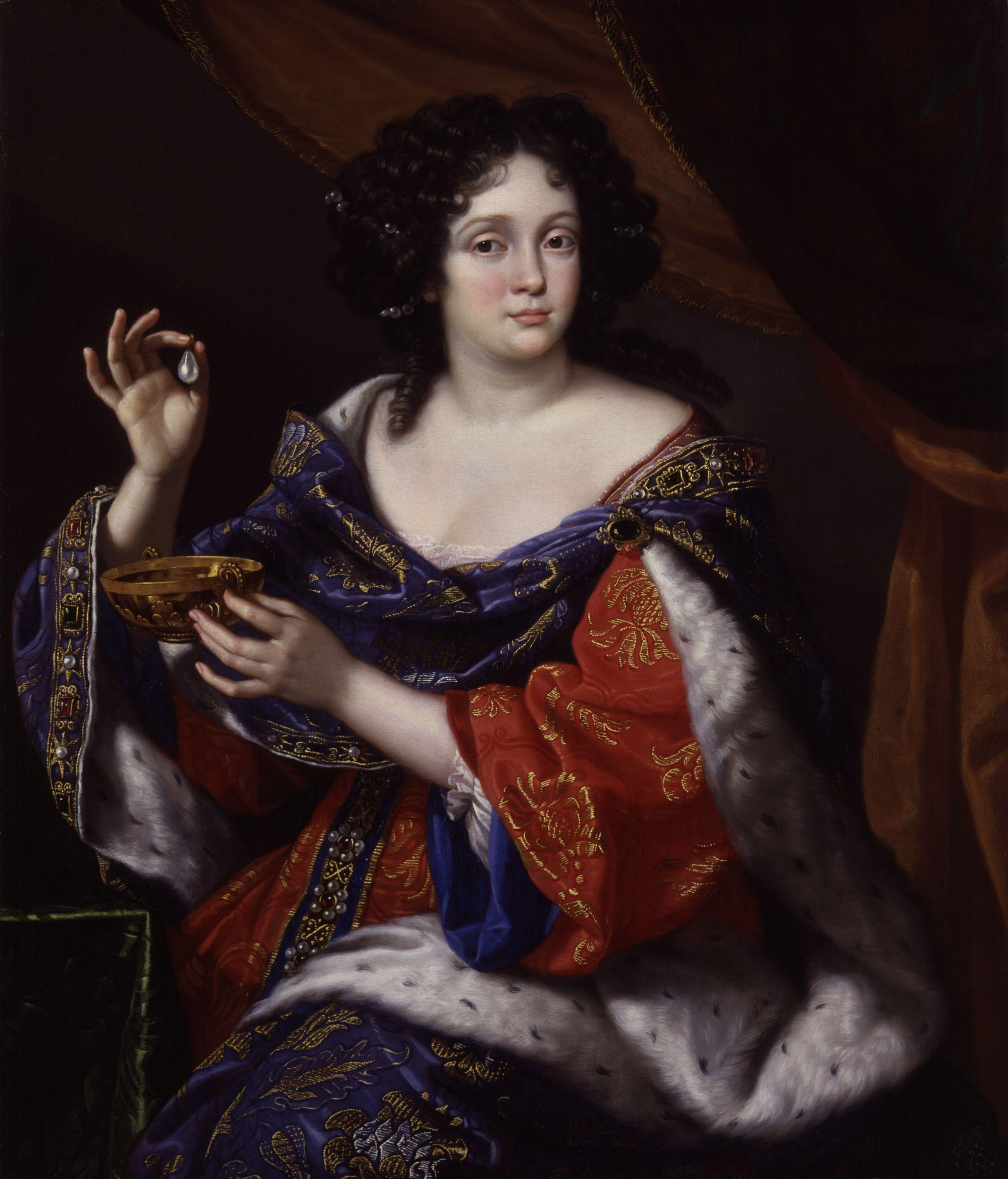
- Portrait by Benedetto Gennari, circa 1672–1673
- Born: 1649
- Died: 20 June 1714 (aged 64–65); Clichy, France
- Spouse: Godefroy Maurice de La Tour d'Auvergne
- Issue Detail: Louis Charles, Prince of Turenne; Emmanuel Theodose, Duke of Bouillon; Frédéric Jules, Prince of Auvergne; Louis Henri, Count of Évreux; Louise Julie, Princess of Montbazon
Names
- Marie Anne Mancini
- Father: Lorenzo Mancini
- Mother: Geronima Mazzarini

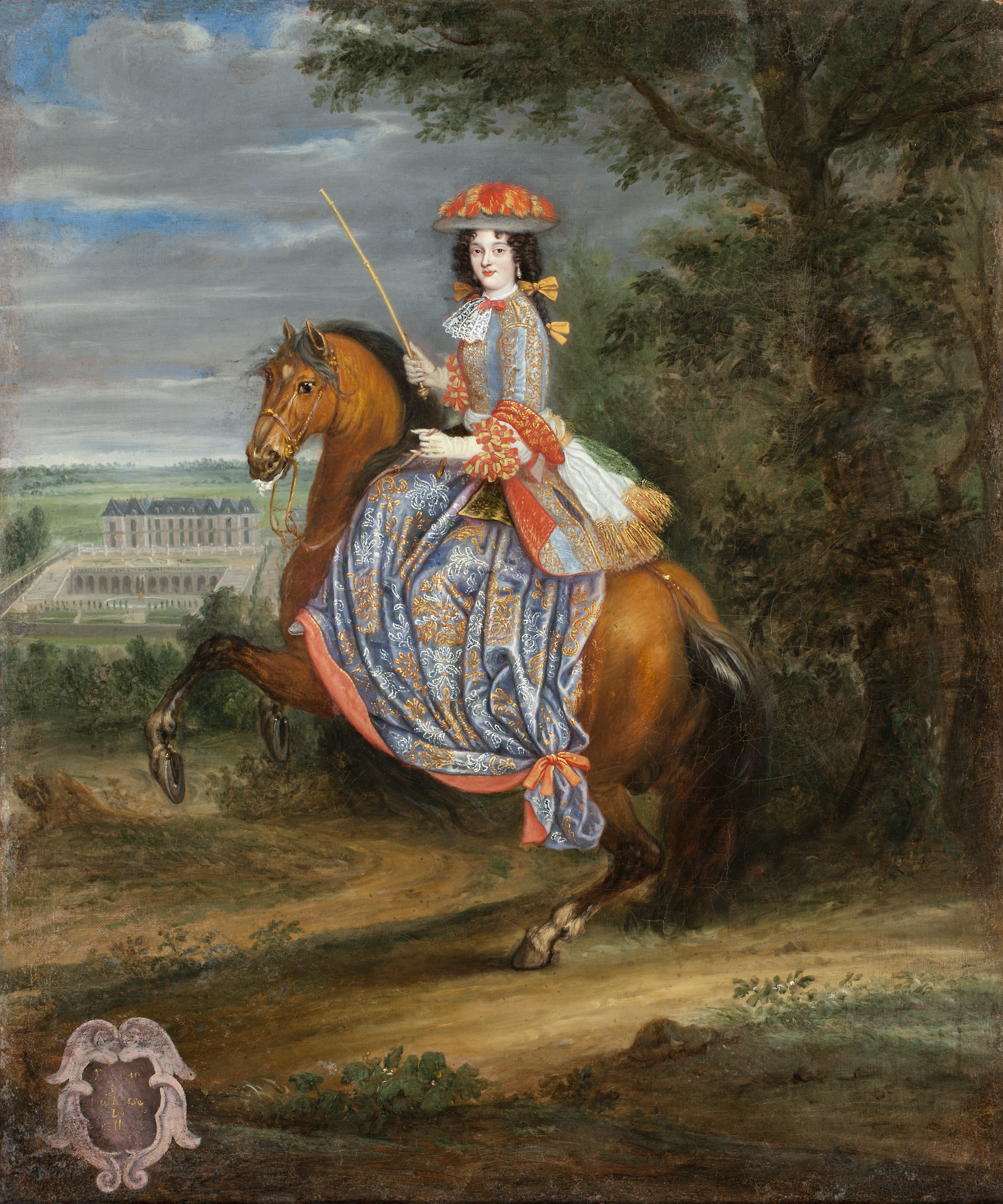
Portrait of Madame La Duchesse De Bouillon, 1670s.

Marie Anne Mancini, Duchess of Bouillon (1649 - 20 June 1714), was an Italian-French aristocrat and cultural patron, the youngest of the five famous Mancini sisters, who along with two of their female Martinozzi cousins, were known at the court of Louis XIV, King of France as the Mazarinettes, because their uncle was the king's chief minister, Cardinal Mazarin. She is known for her involvement in the famous Affair of the Poisons, and as the patron of La Fontaine.

== Life ==
Marie Anne's parents were Lorenzo Mancini, a Roman baron, necromancer and astrologer, and Geronima Mazzarini, sister of Cardinal Mazarin.

Her four famous sisters were:

- Laure (1636–1657), the eldest, who married Louis de Bourbon, Duke of Vendôme, grandson of King Henri IV and his mistress, Gabrielle d'Estrées, and became the mother of the famous French general Louis Joseph, Duke of Vendôme,
- Olympe (1638–1708), who married Eugene Maurice, Count of Soissons and became the mother of the famous Austrian general Prince Eugene of Savoy,
- Marie (1639–1715), the third sister, was considered the least beautiful of the sisters but was the one who snagged the biggest prize of all: Louis XIV. The young king was so besotted with her that he wanted to marry her. In the end, he was made to give her up, and she married Prince Lorenzo Colonna, who remarked that he was surprised to find her a virgin, as one does not expect to find 'innocence among the loves of kings'. (from Antonia Fraser's book Love and Louis XIV)
- Hortense (1646–1699), the beauty of the family, who escaped from her abusive husband, Armand-Charles de la Porte, duc de La Meilleraye, and went to London, where she became the mistress of King Charles II.

The Mancinis were not the only female family members that Cardinal Mazarin brought to the French court. The others were Marie Anne's first cousins, daughters of Mazarin's eldest sister. The elder, Laura Martinozzi, married Alfonso IV d'Este, duke of Modena and was the mother of Mary of Modena, second wife of James II of England. The younger, Anne Marie Martinozzi, married Armand, Prince de Conti.

The Mancini also had three brothers: Paul, Philippe, and Alphonse. Philippe Jules Mancini was a lover of Philippe de France, brother of Louis XIV.

=== Early life ===
Marie Anne reached Paris much later than her sisters, in 1655, when she was a mere child of six. The last Mazarinette became the "spoiled darling" of the French court and of her uncle, who was greatly amused by the literary six-year-old's verses and bon mots. She was considered a wit and a beauty. Even more than her older sister Hortense, Cardinal Mazarin's favourite niece, Marie Anne, is often referred to as "the wittiest and most vivacious of the sisters." According to a contemporary, she was "said to be quite divine, having infinite appeal." Self-possessed, she excelled at such courtly diversions as dancing and plays.

In 1657, her eldest sister, Laure, died in childbirth. Marie Anne, despite her young age, was given her sister's three sons to raise. Marie Anne was only a few years older than her nephews. The youngest child, Jules César, died three years later in 1660. The two older boys, Louis Joseph and Philippe, however, survived. Both young men became soldiers, with Louis Joseph eventually gaining fame as a general.

=== Marriage and culture patronage ===
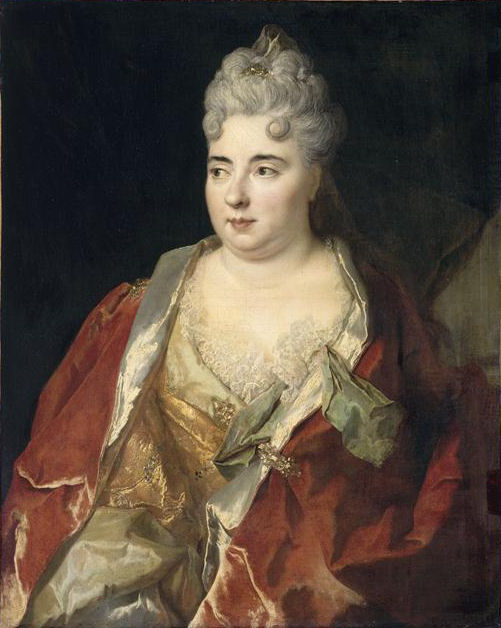
Marie Anne by Nicolas de Largillière, c.1700

Her uncle died when she was thirteen, in 1661. The night before the cardinal's death, the famous field marshal Turenne came to his bedside to ask for the hand of Marie Anne in the name of his nephew Godefroy Maurice de La Tour d'Auvergne, the duc de Bouillon. About a year later, on 22 April 1662, Marie Anne wed the duke at the Hôtel de Soissons, in the presence of King Louis XIV, the queen and the queen dowager.

Her husband was described as a good soldier, but a bad courtier and even worse literary man. As a result, the intelligent and ambitious fifteen-year-old duchess was left on her own to pursue her political and literary interests. She established a small salon at her new residence, the Hôtel de Bouillon. Marie Anne is best remembered for her literary pursuits and for her patronage of the young La Fontaine.

She and her spouse had a harmonious marriage. Her husband loved her and was tolerant of her love affairs, and refused to follow the wish of his family and have her incarcerated in a convent for adultery. On one occasion, when she herself took refuge in a convent out of fear for his family after a particularly public love affair, her husband himself asked her to leave the convent and return to him.

=== The Affaire des Poisons ===
She was socially and politically compromised in the notorious Affaire des Poisons, allegedly for planning to poison her husband in order to marry her nephew Louis Joseph, duc de Vendôme. She was to have visited Adam Lesage and expressed this wish to him.

Unlike her older sister, Olympe, comtesse de Soissons, who was forced to flee to Liège and later to Brussels, in order to escape arrest, Marie Anne was never formally convicted. The trial against her was conducted on 29 January 1680, and she appeared escorted by her husband and her lover Vendôme, holding each of her arms, and stated that she did not accept the authority of the court and had accepted the court summons only out of respect for the king's rank. She claimed that she and Vendôme had merely expressed a wish of frivolity, a joke, harmless and not honestly intended, to Lesage, and that if they believed that she had the wish to murder her husband, they could ask him if he thought so, as he had accompanied her to the trial.

She was freed in the lack of evidence, but was still exiled to the provinces by the king. She spent some time in Nérac and was able to return to Paris and the royal court in March 1681. She was greatly admired within the aristocracy because of her wit and lack of fear during her trial, but she was never again well seen by the king, and in 1685, he banished her to the provinces once more, this time for a period of five years. The king finally allowed her to return permanently in 1690, but after this, she preferred to avoid the royal court.

== Issue ==
- Louis Charles de La Tour d'Auvergne, Prince of Turenne (14 January 1665–4 August 1692) died at Enghien, married Anne Geneviève de Lévis, daughter of Madame de Ventadour, no issue;
- Marie Élisabeth de La Tour d'Auvergne, Mademoiselle de Bouillon (8 July 1666–24 December 1725) never married;
- Emmanuel Theodose de La Tour d'Auvergne, Duke of Bouillon (1668–17 April 1730) married first Marie Armande Victoire de la Trémoïlle (1677–1717), daughter of Charles Belgique Hollande de La Trémoille, and had issue; married second Louise Françoise Angélique Le Tellier, granddaughter of Louvois, and had issue; married third Anne Marie Christiane de Simiane (d.1722) and had issue; married fourth Louise Henriette Françoise de Lorraine, the daughter of the Count of Harcourt, and had issue;
- Eugene Maurice de La Tour d'Auvergne, Prince of Château-Thierry (29 March 1669–23 November 1672) never married;
- Frédéric Jules de La Tour d'Auvergne, Prince of Auvergne (2 May 1672–1733) married Olive Catherine de Trantes and had issue;
- Louis Henri de La Tour d'Auvergne, Count of Évreux (2 August 1674–23 January 1753) married Marie Anne Crozat, daughter of Antoine Crozat, no issue;
- Louise Julie de La Tour d'Auvergne, Mademoiselle de Château-Thierry (26 November 1679–21 November 1750) married François Armand de Rohan and had a child who died aged 3.
