= Girolama Mazzarini =

French noble

Girolama Mazarini
- Born: 1608 or 1614; Rome, Papal States
- Died: 29 December 1656; Paris, Kingdom of France
- Noble family: Mazarin (by birth); Mancini (by marriage)
- Spouse: Lorenzo Mancini (m. 1634; died 1650)
- Issue: Laura, Duchess of Vendôme; Paul Jules Mancini; Olympia, Countess of Soissons; Maria, Princess Colonna; Philippe, Duke of Nevers; Margherita Mancini; Alfonso Mancini; Hortense, Duchess of La Meilleraye; Anna Mancini; Maria Anna, Duchess of Bouillon
- Father: Pietro Mazzarini
- Mother: Ortensia Bufalini

Girolama or Geronima Mazarini (1608 or 1614 – 29 December 1656) was the sister of Cardinal Mazarin, the chief minister of France at the start of the reign of King Louis XIV. She was the mother of the five famous Mancini sisters, who with two of their female Martinozzi cousins, became famous at the French court as the Mazarinettes.

== Early life ==
Born in Rome, Geronima was the daughter of Pietro Mazzarini and Ortensia Bufalini. Her father struggled to provide for his six children until joining the staff of the great Constable of Naples and prince of Paliano, Filippo I Colonna. Thanks to his skill, he won over Colonna, and benefited from the prince's protection of each of his children.

== Family and issue ==
Geronima married an Italian aristocrat, Baron Lorenzo Mancini, (1602–1650), son of Paolo Lucio Mancini and Vittoria Capoccii, on 6 August 1634. Her husband was known as a necromancer and astrologer.

They had ten children:

- Laura Mancini (1636–1657); married Louis de Bourbon, Duke of Vendôme and became the mother of the famous French general Louis Joseph de Bourbon, Duke of Vendôme.
- Paul Jules Mancini (born 1636, died 1652 or 1654 in battle)
- Olympia Mancini (1638–1708); married Eugene Maurice, Count of Soissons and became the mother of the famous Austrian general Prince Eugene of Savoy.
- Marie Mancini (1639–1715); married Lorenzo Colonna and was the first romantic love of King Louis XIV.
- Philippe Mancini (1641–1707); nominated Duke of Nevers and Donzy by his uncle, Cardinal Mazarin, with the prerogative to strike coins, in 1660. He was a knight of the Order of the Holy Spirit and Lieutenant of the First Company of Musketeers of the King; his successor in the charge was the Count D'Artagnan;
- Margherita Mancini (born 1643)
- Alfonso Mancini (born 1644, died 1658)
- Hortense Mancini (1646–1699); the beauty of the family, who escaped her abusive husband, Armand Charles de La Porte de La Meilleraye, Duke of La Meilleraye, and went to London, where she became the mistress of King Charles II.
- Anna Mancini (born 1647)
- Marie Anne Mancini (1649–1714); married Godefroy Maurice de La Tour d'Auvergne, Duke of Bouillon, a nephew of the famous field marshal Turenne, and patroness of Racine and La Fontaine.

== Widowhood ==
After her husband's death in 1650, Geronima brought her children from Rome to Paris in the hope of using the influence of her brother, Cardinal Mazarin, to gain them advantageous marriages, a goal that ultimately was very successful.

She died in Paris in 1656.
