= Armand Charles de La Porte, 2nd Duke of La Meilleraye =

Duke of La Meilleraye, French Grand Master and Captain General of Artillery

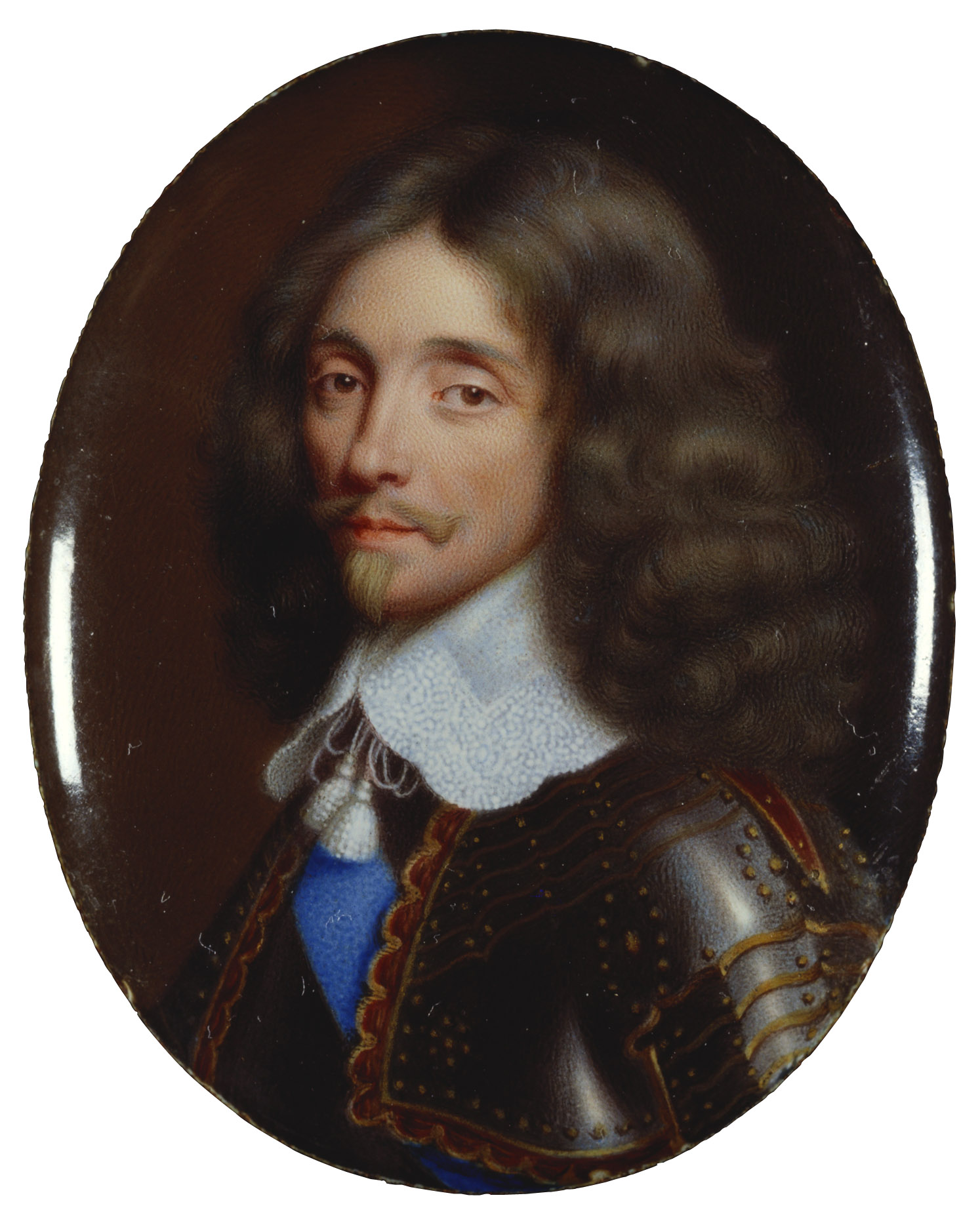
Charles de La Porte depicted here in armour, with the blue ribbon of the Order of the Holy Spirit. The portrait, painted in enamel by the leading Swiss enamellist, Jean Petitot, derives from an oil painting by Justus van Egmont of 1648, known from an engraving by Robert Nanteuil (1662).

Armand Charles de La Porte, 2nd Duke of La Meilleraye (1632 – 9 November 1713), was a French general, who was Grand Master and Captain General of Artillery. In addition, he was made a French peer, Duke of La Meilleraye, prince de Château-Porcien, Marquis of Montcornet, as well as Count of La Fère and of Marle. He married a niece of Cardinal Mazarin.

== Biography ==
The son of Charles de La Porte (called "Marshal de La Meilleraye") and nephew of Cardinal Richelieu, Armand Charles was Marquis of La Porte. He later became Marquis of La Meilleraye and then Duke of Mayenne. He served as Grand Master of the French Artillery in 1646 or 1648.

== Marriage ==
On 1 March 1661 he married Hortense Mancini, the favourite niece and heiress of the immensely wealthy Cardinal Mazarin. Upon his marriage, he became Duke Mazarin.

== Children ==
The duke and his wife had four children:

1. Marie Charlotte de La Porte (28 March 1662 – 13 May 1729) married Louis Armand de Vignerot, Marquis of Richelieu.
2. Marie Anne de La Porte (1663 – October 1720) became an abbess.
3. Marie Olympe de La Porte (1665 – 24 January 1754) married Louis Christophe Giqault, Marquis of Bellefonds and of Boullaye;
4. Paul Jules de La Porte, Duke Mazarin and of La Meilleraye (25 January 1666 – 7 September 1731) married Félice Armande Charlotte de Durfort.

The marriage proved quite unhappy due to the duke's mistreatment of his wife and general strange behaviour. He was miserly and extremely jealous, and mentally unstable. His strange behaviour included preventing milkmaids from going about their job (to his mind, the cows' udders had strong sexual connotations), having all of his female servants' front teeth knocked out to prevent them from attracting male attention, and chipping off and painting over all the "dirty bits" in his fantastic art collection. He forbade his wife to keep company with other men, made midnight searches for hidden lovers, insisted she spend a quarter of her day at prayer, and forced her to leave Paris and move with him to the country.

In 1668 Hortense fled France, in order to escape her abusive husband and eventually settled in England, where she became a mistress of King Charles II.

He died in the castle of La Meilleraye, today in ruins, (Beaulieu-sous-Parthenay) in 1713.

== Sources ==
- Guyard de la Fosse, Histoire de Mayenne
- Bibliothèque nationale de France, fr. 11. 468
- M. Pinard, Chronologie militaire, t. IV, p. 201
- Relation d'Ezéchiel Spanheim
- Grosse-Duperon, Souvenirs du Vieux-Mayenne
- Grosse-Duperon, Etude sur Fontaine-Daniel
