= Charles Armand René de La Trémoille =

Charles Armand René de La Trémoille, 7th Duke of Thouars (14 January 1708 – 23 May 1741), 7th Duke of Thouars, was the son of Charles Louis Bretagne de La Trémoille and his wife, Marie Madeleine Motier de la Fayette.

== Career ==
La Trémoille joined the military and became a colonel of a regiment in his name. He later became colonel of the Champagne regiment, which he led in the Italian campaigns from 1733 to 1734. He distinguished himself in the attack on Colorno.

He also distinguished himself in the battle of Guastalla, in Italy, and was named shortly thereafter sergeant of the armies of the king.

La Trémoille was the author of some works and was elected a member of the Académie française on 13 February 1738.

In 1741, he became governor of Île-de-France, but died that same year.

== Personal life ==
On 29 January 1725 he married his cousin Marie Hortense de La Tour d'Auvergne, the daughter of Marie Armande Victoire de la Trémoïlle (1677–1717) and Emmanuel-Théodose de La Tour d'Auvergne, duc de Bouillon (1668–1730).

Marie Hortense, like her husband was a grandchild of Charles Belgique Hollande de La Trémoille. From this union was born a son: Jean Bretagne Charles de La Trémoille and a daughter who died in infancy.

== Issue ==
- Jean Bretagne Charles de La Trémoille (4 February 1737 – 15 May 1792) married Marie Geneviève de Durfort, no issue. Married Princess Marie Maximilienne Louise of Salm-Kyrburg and had issue.
- X de La Trémoille (5 Mar 1740 – March 1744) female who died in infancy.

Charles Armand René de La Trémoille House of La Trémoille Born: 14 January 1708 Died: 23 May 1741
French nobility
Preceded by Charles Louis Bretagne de La Trémoille	Duc de Thouars; 9 October 1719 – 23 May 1741	Succeeded by Jean Bretagne Charles de La Trémoille
