= Frédéric Maurice de La Tour d'Auvergne, Duc de Bouillon =

Frédéric Maurice
- Duke of Bouillon
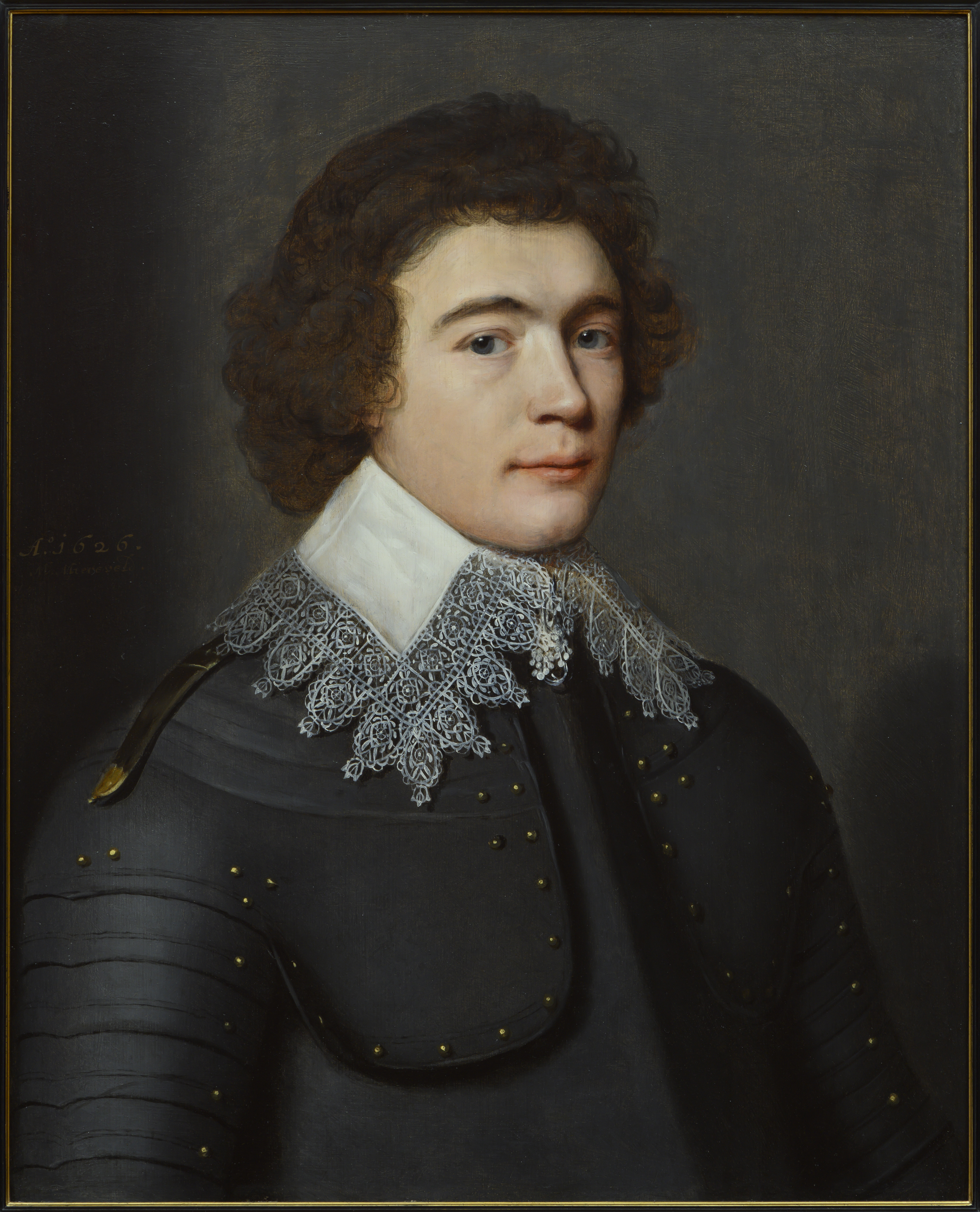
- Portrait of Frédéric-Maurice de La Tour d’Auvergne
- Born: 22 October 1605
- Died: 9 August 1652 (aged 46); Pontoise
- Burial: Évreux
- Spouse: Eleonora Catharina Febronis, Countess of the Bergh
- Issue: Godefroy Maurice, Duke of Bouillon; Frédéric Maurice, Count of Auvergne; Emmanuel-Théodose, Cardinal of Bouillon and Duke of Albret; Constantin Ignace, Duke of Château-Thierry; Henri Ignace, Count of Évreux; Mauricienne Fébronie, Duchess of Bavaria-Leuchtenberg; Élisabeth, Duchess of Elbeuf
- House: La Tour d'Auvergne
- Father: Henri de La Tour d'Auvergne, Duke of Bouillon, Prince of Sedan
- Mother: Elisabeth of Nassau
- Religion: Calvinism, later Roman Catholicism

Frédéric Maurice de La Tour d'Auvergne, Duke of Bouillon (22 October 1605 – 9 August 1652) was ruler of the independent principality of Sedan, and a general in the French royal army.

== Life ==
Born in Sedan, Ardennes, he was the son of Henri de La Tour d'Auvergne, Duke of Bouillon, Prince of Sedan, and Elisabeth of Orange-Nassau. His brother was the renowned Turenne, Marshal of France. Raised as a Protestant, he received a military education in Holland under his uncles, Maurice of Nassau-Orange, and Frederick Henry, Prince of Orange.

He became Duke of Bouillon, and Prince of Sedan, Jametz, and Raucourt (now in Ardennes, France) at the death of his father in 1623. He was appointed governor of Maastricht in the United Provinces in 1629. In 1634 he married Countess Eleonora van Berg's-Heerenberg (French: Éléonore de Bergh), under whose influence he converted to Catholicism.

In 1635 the Duke of Bouillon came into the service of King Louis XIII, and was appointed maréchal de camp (brigadier general). He was deprived of his offices in the United Provinces after engaging in negotiations with Spain (the arch-enemy of the United Provinces) in 1637.

Along with the Louis de Bourbon, comte de Soissons, he conspired against Cardinal Richelieu, and with the support of Spanish troops he and the comte de Soissons defeated the French royal troops sent after them at the Battle of La Marfée, outside of Sedan, in 1641.

Later he submitted to King Louis XIII and Richelieu, and he was promoted to the rank of lieutenant general in command of the French army of Italy (1642). Having again conspired against Richelieu with Cinq-Mars, he was arrested in Casale Italy, and was released only when his wife threatened to open Sedan to the Spaniards (1642). During this misfortune, he promised to cede the strategic border principalities of Sedan and Raucourt to France.

In 1650 he joined the Fronde, and was one of its leaders with his brother Turenne. Cardinal Mazarin won him over (1650) by promising him high office and compensations for the cessions of Sedan and Raucourt, exchanged in 1651 for the duchies of Albret and Château-Thierry, the counties of Auvergne and Évreux, and several other lands.

He died at Pontoise, near Paris, in 1652 and was buried in Évreux. His and his wife's bodies were moved to Cluny where they arrived in 1692.

== Tomb monument ==
Between 1697 and 1707, the duke's son, Émmanuel-Théodose de la Tour d'Auvergne, cardinal de Bouillon, commissioned the sculptor Pierre Le Gros the Younger to create a family monument to be erected in Cluny Abbey, of which the cardinal was abbot. All the sculptures were finished by 1707 and shipped to Cluny, where they arrived in 1709 but were not even being unpacked for nearly a century because Bouillon had grossly disobeyed Louis XIV and was declared an enemy of the state. The sculptures are today displayed in the Hôtel-Dieu in Cluny.

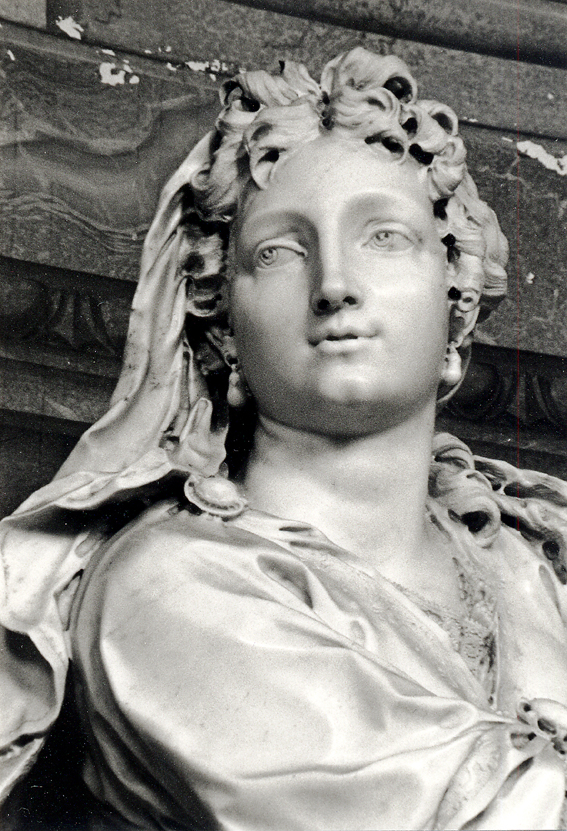
Éléonor de Bergh, duchesse de Bouillon, sculpture by Pierre Le Gros the Younger

== Children ==
Frédéric Maurice and his wife Éléonor van den Bergh had five sons and four daughters:

- Élisabeth (1635–1680), married Charles III, Duke of Elbeuf, and had issue.
- Godefroy Maurice, 3rd duc de Bouillon (1636–1721)
- Louise-Charlotte (1638–1683) "known as Mademoiselle de Bouillon";
- Amelie (1640-), who became a nun
- Frédéric Maurice, comte d'Auvergne (1642–1707) married Princess Henriette Françoise von Hohenzollern-Hechingen, Marquise de Bergen-op-Zoom and had 13 children, including Henri Oswald de La Tour d'Auvergne, later Cardinal d’Auvergne (1671-1747). He was also grandfather of Maria Henriette de La Tour d'Auvergne, mother of Charles Theodore, Elector of Bavaria.
- Émmanuel-Théodose, duc d'Albret, later Cardinal de Bouillon (1643–1715)
- Hippolyte (1645–?), who entered the priesthood
- Constantin Ignace, duc de Château-Thierry (1646–1670) at the age of 16 joined the order of St. John of Jerusalem
- Henri Ignace, le comte d'Évreux (1650–1675) nicknamed "Chevalier de Bouillon"
- Mauricienne Fébronie de La Tour d’Auvergne (1652–1706) (aka Princesse d'Evreux), married 1668 Maximilian, Duke of Bavaria-Leuchtenberg (1638–1705), without issue

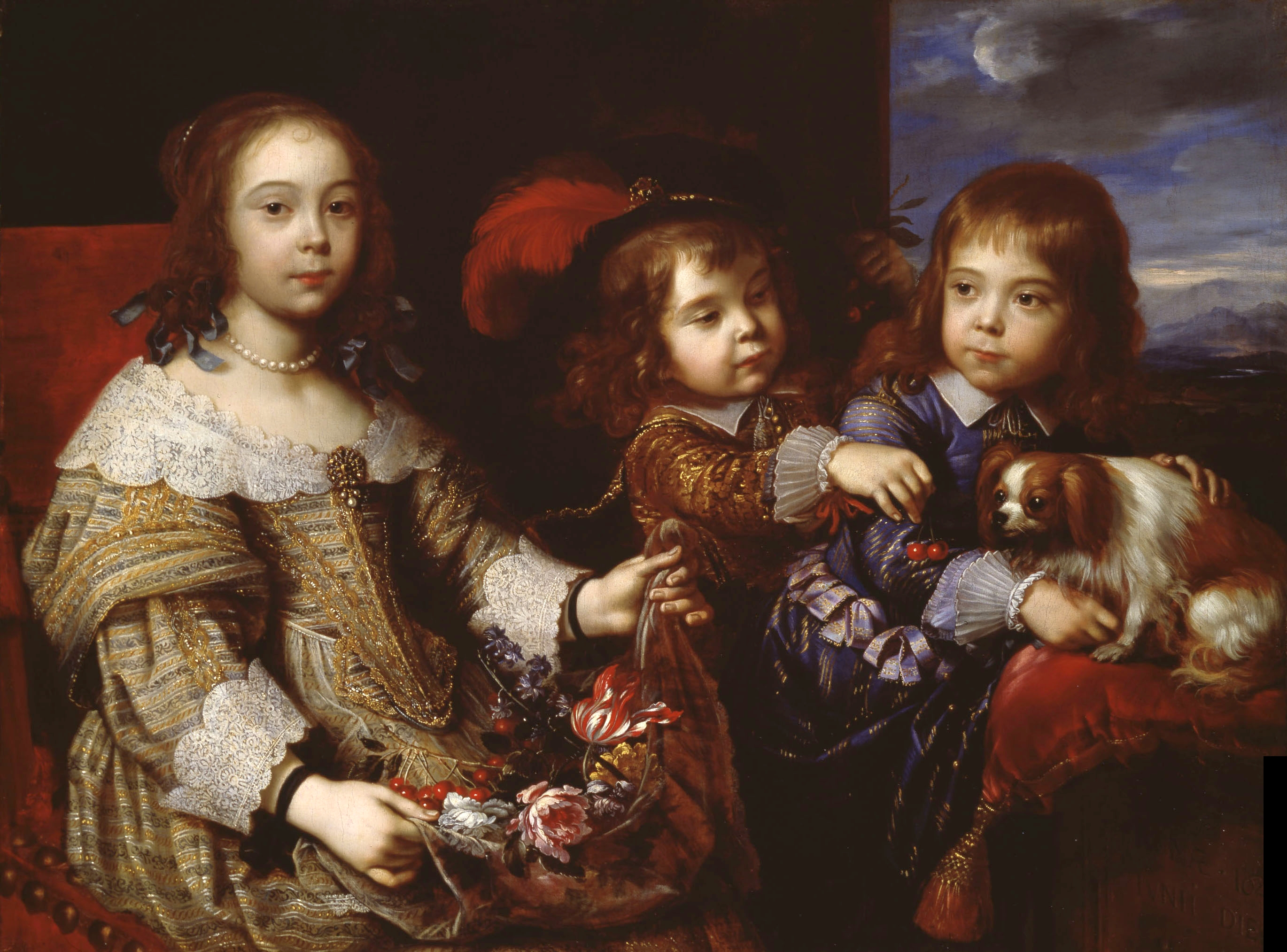
Frédéric Maurice's eldest three children, Pierre Mignard.
