= Henri Charles de La Trémoille, 4th Duke of Thouars =

French noble (1620–1672)

Henri Charles de La Trémoille, 4th Duke of Thouars (17 December 1622 – 15 September 1672) was a French nobleman and military commander. He was the son of Henry de La Trémoille, duc of Thouars and of La Trémoille, and his wife, Charlotte de La Tour d'Auvergne.

In 1628, La Trémoille's father, Henri de La Trémoïlle, converted himself and his children to Catholicism, but La Trémoille's mother convinced him to reconvert to Protestantism when he reached the age of majority. In 1638, he joined the army of his uncle, Frederick Henry, Prince of Orange. In 1648, he married the Calvinist Émilie of Hesse-Kassel, the daughter of William V of Hesse-Kassel (or Hesse-Cassel). They had five children, including Charles Belgique, his heir, and Charlotte Amélie de la Trémoille.

In October 1651, during the Fronde, he came out against Cardinal Mazarin and supported the Prince of Condé openly. As a result, in 1656 he was imprisoned in Amiens. La Trémoille's mother obtained his release after several months of imprisonment. He was then relegated in Poitou then turned over to serve in Holland. In 1668, he returned from Holland to manage the affairs of the duchy of Thouars, his father being weakened by the gout, and he again re-converted to Catholicism, taking away the children from his wife who fled to the Netherlands. He died two years before his father in 1672; it was thus his elder son, Charles, who succeeded as the fourth duke of Thouars.
