= Countess Elisabeth of Nassau =

Duchess of Bouillon (1577–1642)

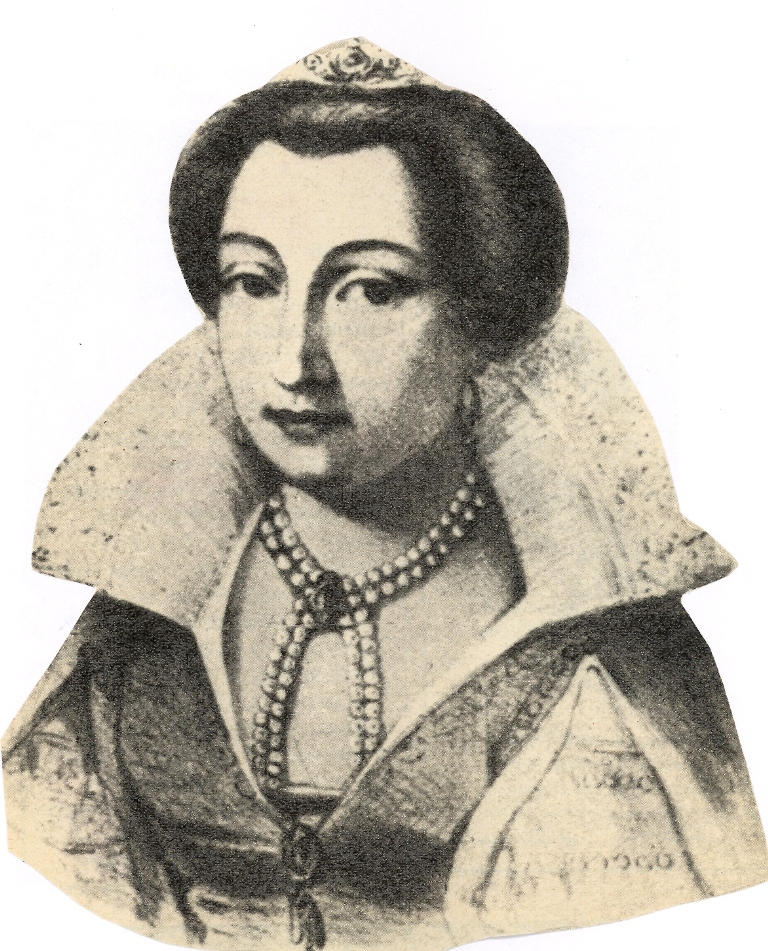
Countess Elisabeth of Nassau

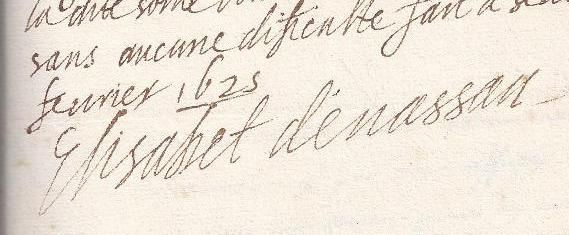
Signature

Countess Elisabeth of Nassau (Elisabeth Flandrika) (Middelburg, 26 April 1577 – Sedan, 3 September 1642) was the second daughter of prince William of Orange and his third spouse Charlotte of Bourbon, and Duchess of Bouillon by marriage to Henri de La Tour d'Auvergne. She was the regent of Sedan during the absence of her husband; between 1623 and 1626 during the minority of her son; and from 1632 during the absence of her son.

== Biography ==
After her father was murdered in 1584, there was a shortage of money for Elisabeth, her siblings and her stepmother Louise de Coligny, and they lived on state support in the Hague.

=== Marriage ===
In 1594 Louise took Elisabeth with her to France, where they met with several Protestant nobles. One of them, Henri de La Tour d'Auvergne, ruler of the Duchy of Bouillon and the Principality of Sedan, sent her a proposal of marriage that she accepted. The couple had nine children.

Henri tried to keep his Duchy Sedan Protestant, but had to deal with hostility emanating from his catholic French neighbors. Elisabeth acted as regent during the absence of her spouse.

=== Regent ===
When she was widowed in 1623 she became regent for their son Frédéric Maurice de la Tour until he came of age in 1626. When her son was appointed governor of Maastricht in 1632, she acted has his regent in Sedan. A fervent Calvinist, she made Sedan a center of French huguenots and kept a strict and Spartan court.

She kept in close contact with her stepmother and five sisters, two of whom also acted as regents at some point, and they referred to themselves as "states women" in their correspondence.

She died shortly before Sedan was taken by French-Catholic troops, and Claude Serrau commented that "God loved Madame de Bouillon" for allowing her to die before Sedan was taken by the Catholics.

== Issue ==
- Louise de La Tour d'Auvergne (August 1596 – November 1607) died in infancy;
- Marie de La Tour d'Auvergne (1601 – 24 May 1665) married Henri de La Trémoille, Duke of Thouars, Prince of Talmont and had issue;
- Unnamed son (April 1603)
- Juliane Catherine de La Tour d'Auvergne (8 October 1604 – 6 October 1637) married François de La Rochefoucauld, Count of Roucy, Baron of Pierrepont and had issue;
- Frédéric Maurice de La Tour d'Auvergne (22 October 1605 – 9 August 1652) married Eleonora Catharina of the Bergh and had issue;
- Élisabeth de La Tour d'Auvergne (1606 – 1 December 1685) married Guy Aldonce de Durfort, mother of Jacques and Guy;
- Henriette Catherine de La Tour d'Auvergne (1609 - 1677) married Amaury Gouyon, Marquis of La Moussaye, Count of Quintin and had issue;
- Henri de La Tour d'Auvergne, known as the vicomte de Turenne (11 September 1611 – 27 July 1675) married Charlotte de Caumont daughter of Armand Nompar de Caumont; Armand Nompar was the uncle of the scheming Duke of Lauzun.

== Ancestry ==
Ancestors of Countess Elisabeth of Nassau

8. John V, Count of Nassau-Siegen
4. William I, Count of Nassau-Siegen
9. Elisabeth of Hesse-Marburg
2. William the Silent
10. Bodo III, Count of Stolberg-Wernigerode
5. Juliana of Stolberg-Wernigerode
11. Anna of Eppstein-Königstein
1. Elisabeth of Nassau
12. Louis, Prince of La Roche-sur-Yon
6. Louis, Duke of Montpensier
13. Louise de Bourbon, Duchess of Montpensier
3. Charlotte of Bourbon
14. Jean de Longwy
7. Jacqueline de Longwy
15. Jeanne of Angoulême
