= Wilhelmina von Hessen-Rotenburg =

Landgravial princess

Wilhelmina Maria von Hessen-Rotenburg
- Landgraviate of Hesse-Rotenburg
- Born: 16 February 1755; Rotenburg Castle
- Died: 9 December 1816 (aged 61); Frankfurt am Main
- House: House of Hesse
- Father: Constantine of Hesse-Rotenburg
- Mother: Sophia of Starhemberg

Wilhelmina Maria of Hesse-Rotenburg (born 16 February 1755 at Rotenburg Castle; 9. December 1816 in Frankfurt am Main) was a landgrave princess of the Hesse-Rotenburg line of the House of Hesse and became Provost in the free-world convent of Essen life.

== Life ==
Wilhelmina was a daughter of Constantine, Landgrave of Hesse-Rotenburg (1716–1778) and his wife Sophie von Starhemberg (1722–1773). Her siblings with whom they grew up were:

- Charles Emmanuel (1746–1812), his successor.
- Clementina (1747–1801).
- Hedwig (1748–1801), married Jacques Léopold de La Tour d'Auvergne, Duke of Bouillon.
- Christian (1750–1782), Canon of Cologne and Strasbourg.
- Charles Constantine (1752–1821), a supporter of the French Revolution, better known as Citoyen Hesse.
- Antonia (1753–1823), a nun.
- Ernst (1758–1784), married Christine Wilhelmina Henriette Sophia von Bardeleben (1765–1835).

Wilhelmina was granted a benefice in the Essen convent in 1777 and took possession of this benefice on November 10, 1778. The following year she was admitted to the chapter of the monastery. In Thorn Abbey she was also in possession of a prebend. When she was elected provostess in Essen in 1792, she was appointed head of the Essen monastery. The election only took place in the second round, after the first ballot was invalid. With the secularisation, the Essen Abbey was abolished in 1803. Nevertheless, through skillful negotiations, Wilhelmina managed to secure the continuation of her income from the provost. In the years from 1796 to 1807 she was also a canoness in Elten Abbey. In 1816 Wilhelmina found her final resting place in Frankfurt Main cemetery in Frankfurt am Main.
