= Schloss Blumenstein (Wildeck) =

Former neoclassical palace in Wildeck, Germany

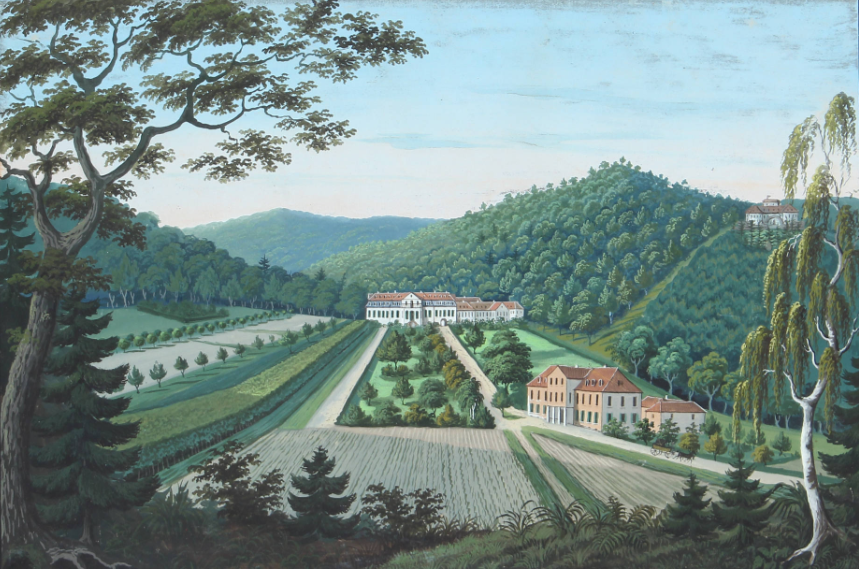
Schloss Blumenstein, the Hessian Sanssouci, with right before it, a guest house, and the Blumenstein hunting lodge in the hills above it

The Blumenstein summer palace (German: Sommerschloss Blumenstein), also named Schloss Wildeck, is a former neoclassical palace in Wildeck, in northeastern Hesse, Germany. It was a hunting lodge and summer residence of landgraves of Hessen-Rotenburg. Once it was called the Hessian Sanssouci, so fantastic were the palace and the English landscape garden parks that were located here. When the last landgrave died in 1834, the palace fell into oblivion. Today, there are remains of the palace gardens and some of its ancillary buildings.

== History ==
=== The Blumenstein hunting lodge ===
Around 1250, Wildeck castle was constructed and in possession of the Landgraves of Thuringia. In the 15th century, it had become a ruin and a hiding place for a gang of robbers.

In 1627, the forest and the ruins of Wildeck castle came into the possession of the semi-sovereign Landgraviate of Hesse-Rotenburg, created by Landgrave Maurice of Hesse-Kassel to provide for his sons from his second marriage to Juliane of Nassau. In 1727, Landgrave Ernst II Leopold of Hesse-Rotenburg built a hunting lodge on the ruins of Wildeck castle, naming it Blumenstein.

=== Summer palace Blumenstein (also named Schloss Wildeck) ===
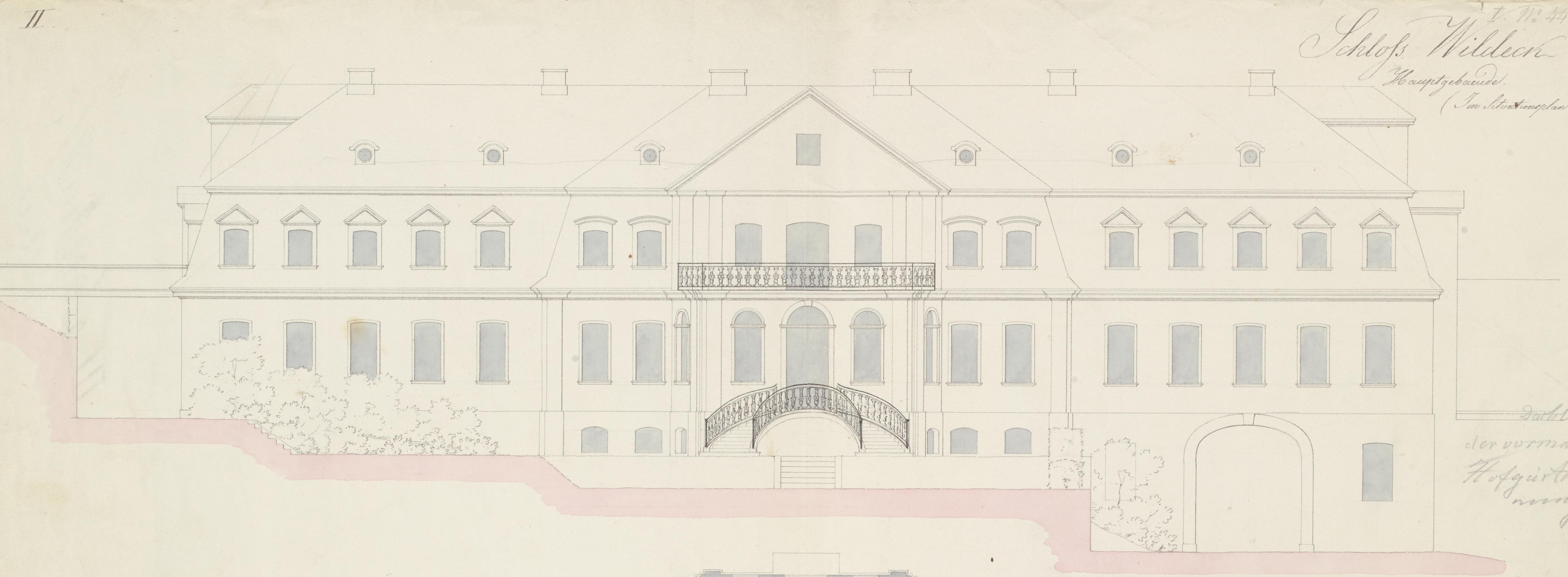
The neoclassical façade of Schloss Blumenstein (1830)

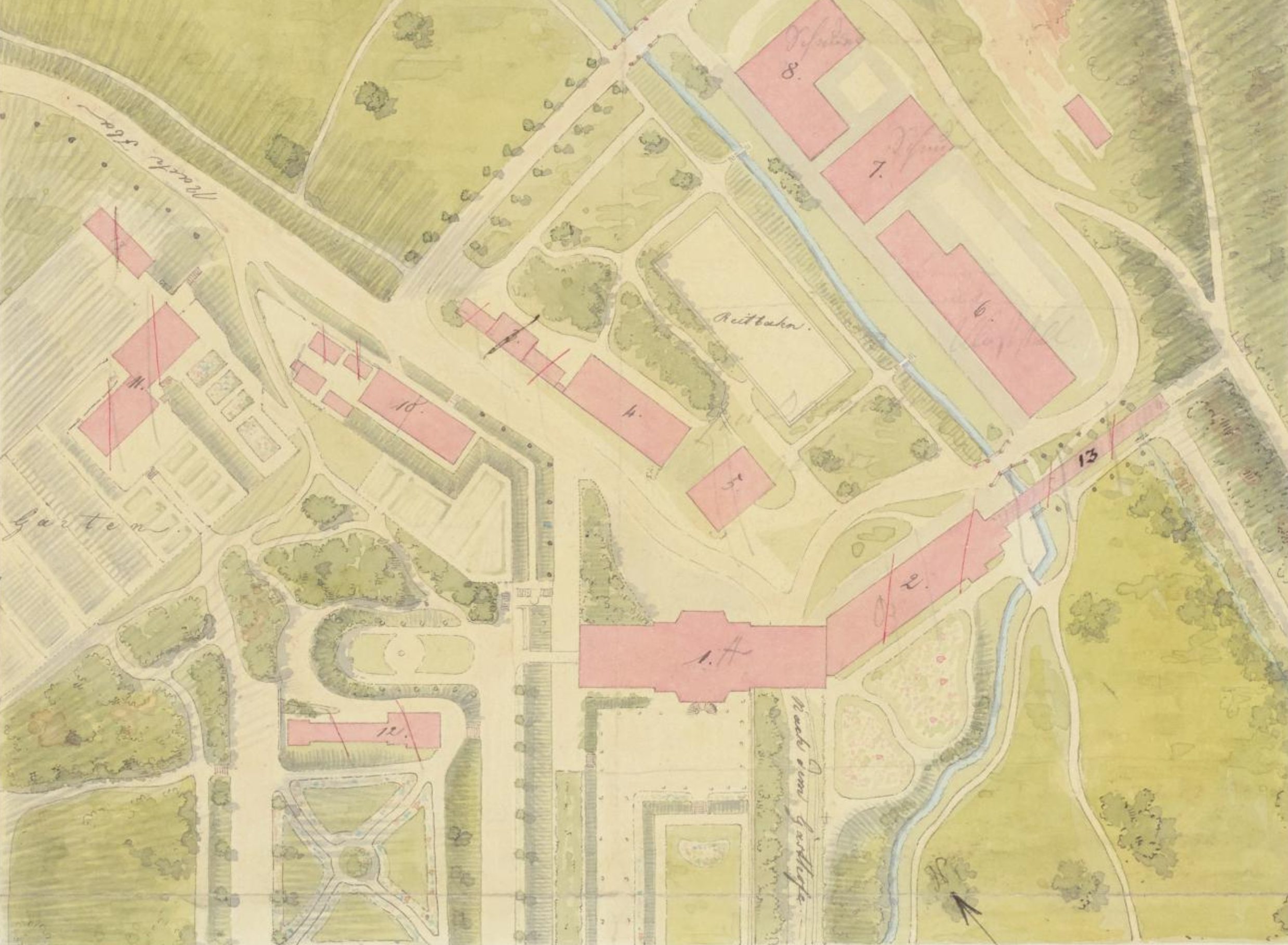
Plan of Schloss Blumenstein and its direct surroundings (1830)

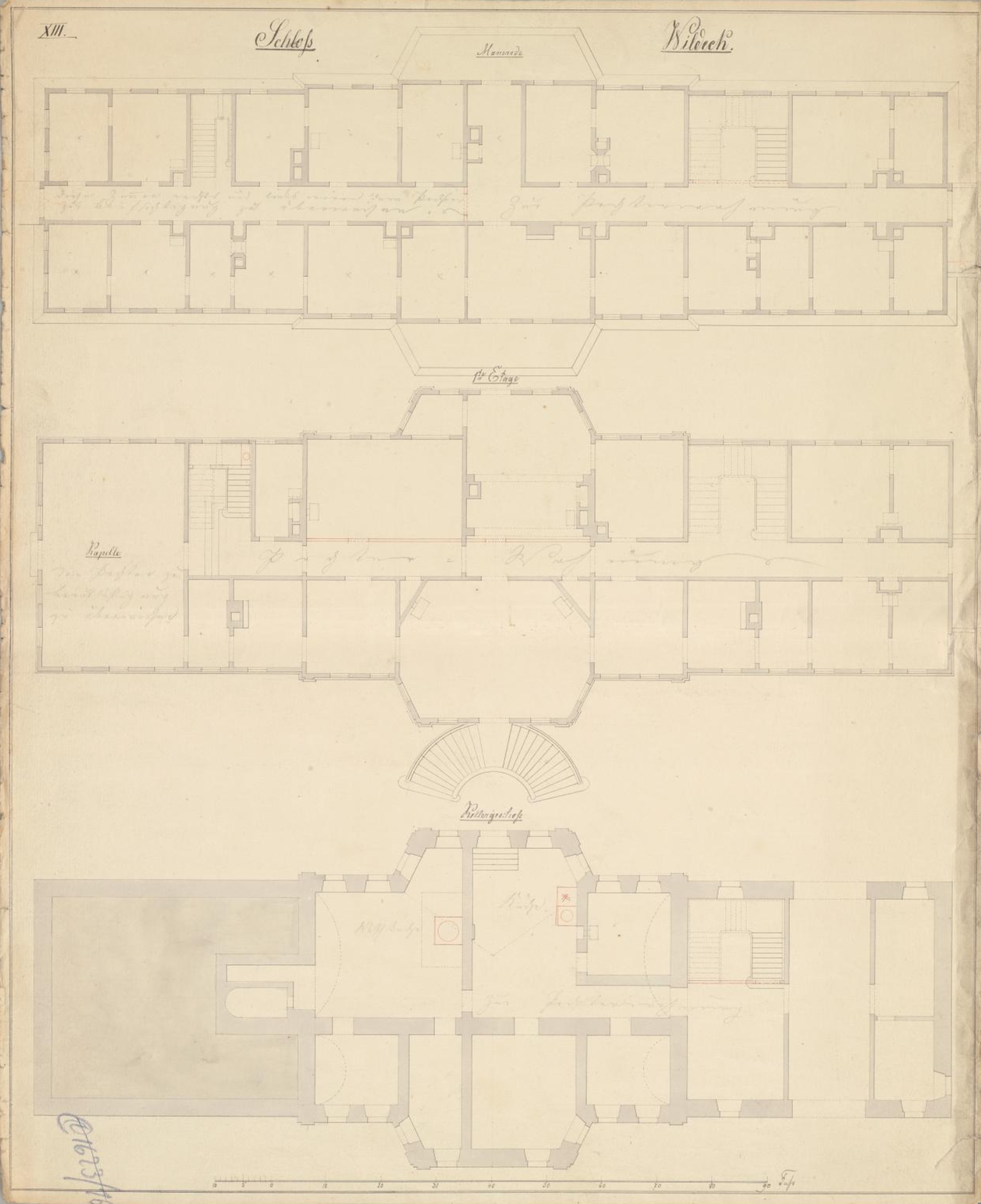
Floor plan of Schloss Blumenstein (1840)

Starting in 1770, Landgrave Constantine of Hesse-Rotenburg had another representative palace built near the hunting lodge Blumenstein, which he named summer palace Blumenstein, along with a large English landschape park and gardens. The Rotenburg Landgrave family regularly spend their summer months in the Wildeck Valley. In September 1811, the Landgrave's daughter Clothilde celebrated her wedding to the Prince of Hohenlohe-Bartenstein here.

When the last landgrave Victor Amadeus dies in 1834, Hesse-Rotenburg was united with Hesse-Kassel according to the arrangement of 1627. Victor Amadeus's estates outside Hesse, the Princely Abbey of Corvey and the Silesian Duchy of Ratibor to his nephews the princes Victor and Chlodwig of Hohenlohe-Waldenburg-Schillingsfürst. Because the Electors of Hesse have many palaces at their disposal, like Schloss Wilhelmshöhe and its beautiful gardens, they show no interest in Blumenstein. The palace falls into oblivion.

With the annexation of the Electorate of Hesse by Prussia in 1866, the palace became Prussian state property. By 1873, it was only used as housing for forestry workers, and a year later it was demolished due to disrepair. The same happens with the Blumenstein hunting lodge, which also is gradually demolished.

== Architecture ==
=== The Blumenstein hunting lodge ===
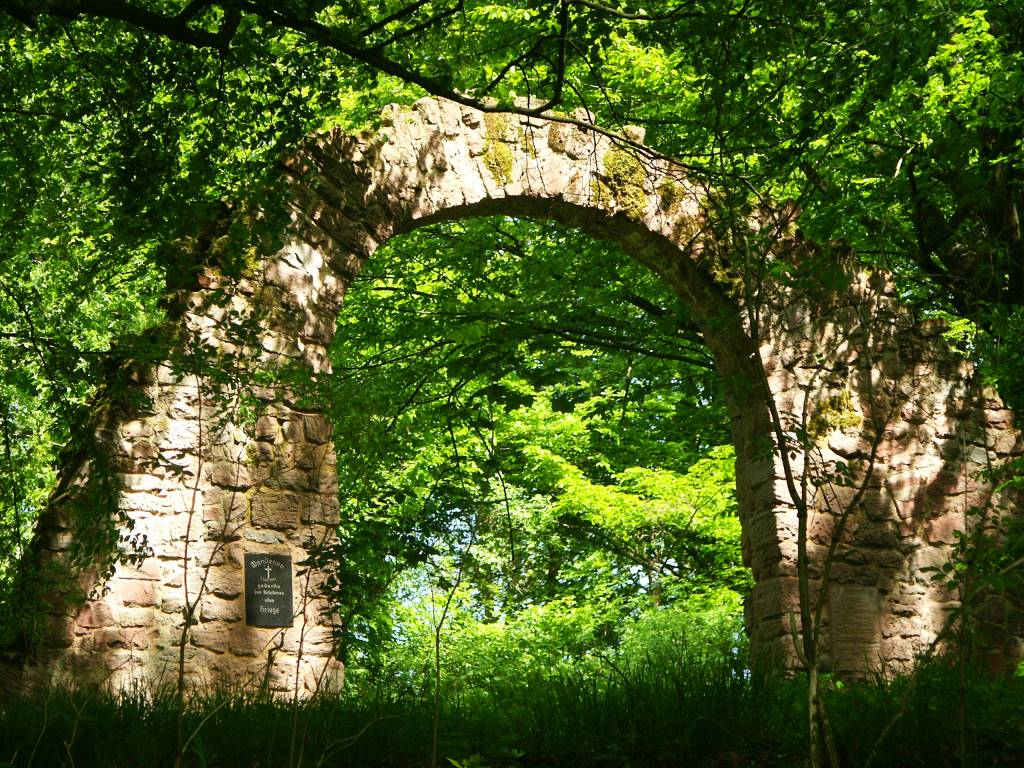
Remains of the Blumenstein hunting lodge

Of the original castle complex, only the foundations of the rectangular enclosing walls and a well covered with stones remain. The builders of the later hunting lodge used the castle ruin as a quarry. Only small remains of the hunting lodge survive – a cellar on the northern side and the archway on the access path.

All remaining walls are preserved through volunteer efforts, funded by donations from associations and citizens of the surrounding communities. Between 2016 and 2020, Hessen-Forst, the owner, invested over €270,000 in the restoration of the ruin.

=== Summer palace Blumenstein (also named Schloss Wildeck) ===
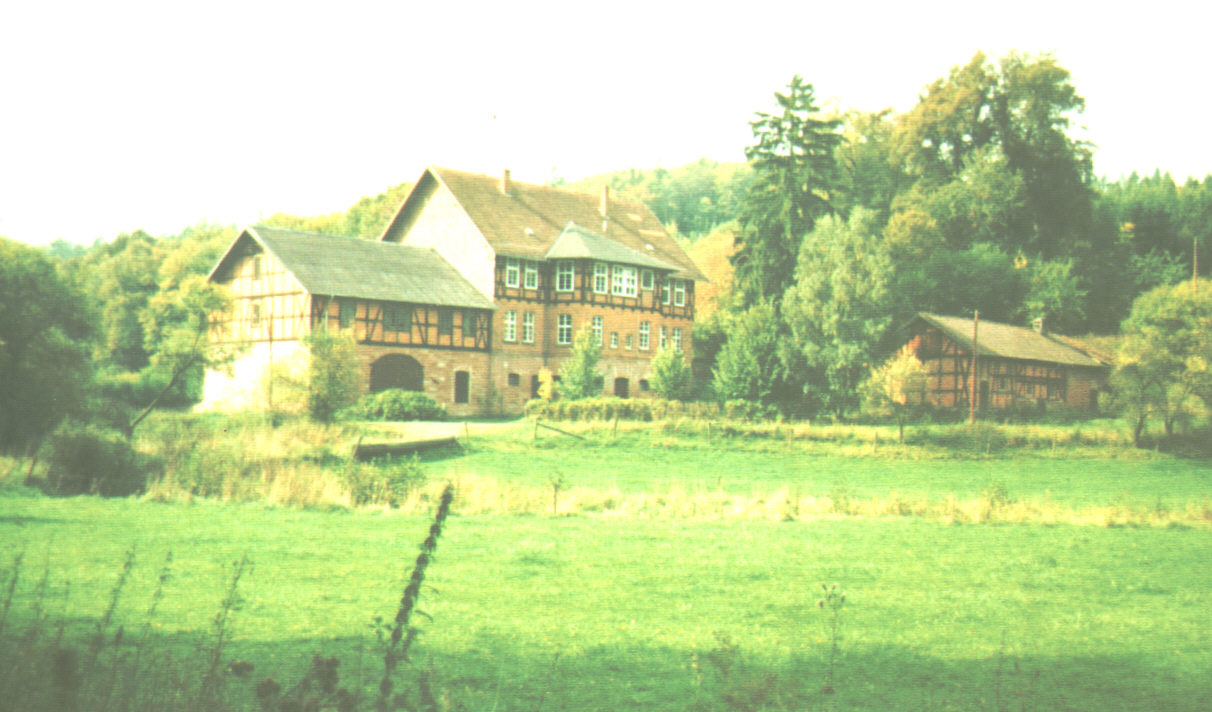
The forestry house built on the foundations of Schloss Wildeck

Only the former guesthouse of the palace complex remains. A forestry house was built over the old palace foundations. A two-part staircase on the garden side of the forestry house still dates back to the summer palace.

== Garden and Park ==
The former garden of the palace and the park, later including a cemetery, extended south of the palace in a trapezoidal shape, about one kilometer long. Near the palace, the park was about 100 meters wide, and at the Stubbach, the right source stream of the Suhl forming the southern boundary, it was about 800 meters wide.

The park still features a 22-meter-high sandstone obelisk, presumably erected around 1790 by Landgrave Charles Emmanuel of Hesse-Rothenburg for his wife, Maria Leopoldine of Liechtenstein.

There is also the "Inselteich" (island pond) with its island, known as the "Love Island." Ten poplar trees once stood on the shores of the round island, and in the center of the island stands a 1.35-meter-high stone pedestal. It features a naturalistic hanging border around it. On the front, there is a relief of a Greek amphora, and above it, in the border, is the Latin inscription "QUAM RAPUIT INVIDA MORS RESTITUTA" (She whom envious death stole has been restored). The pond and island date to the Rococo or Sentimentalism periods. The pedestal is believed to have been an altar or memorial, possibly topped by a statue or other artwork, though it is unknown what originally stood on it, and the meaning of the inscription remains unclear. Additionally, three avenues (plum, birch, and poplar) in the park also originate from this period.

=== Gallery: The palace garden and park ===
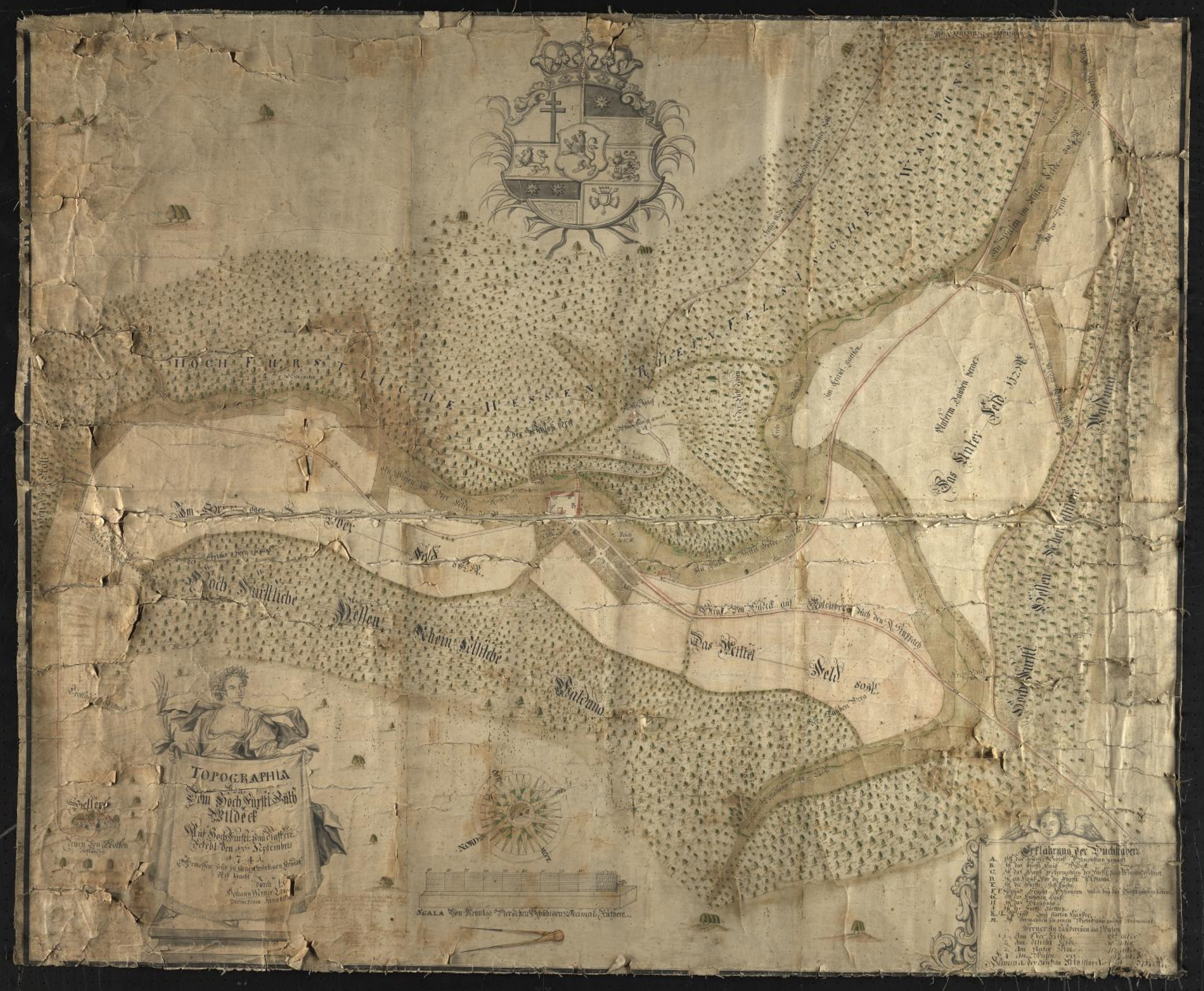
Blumenstein hunting lodge and surroundings (1741)

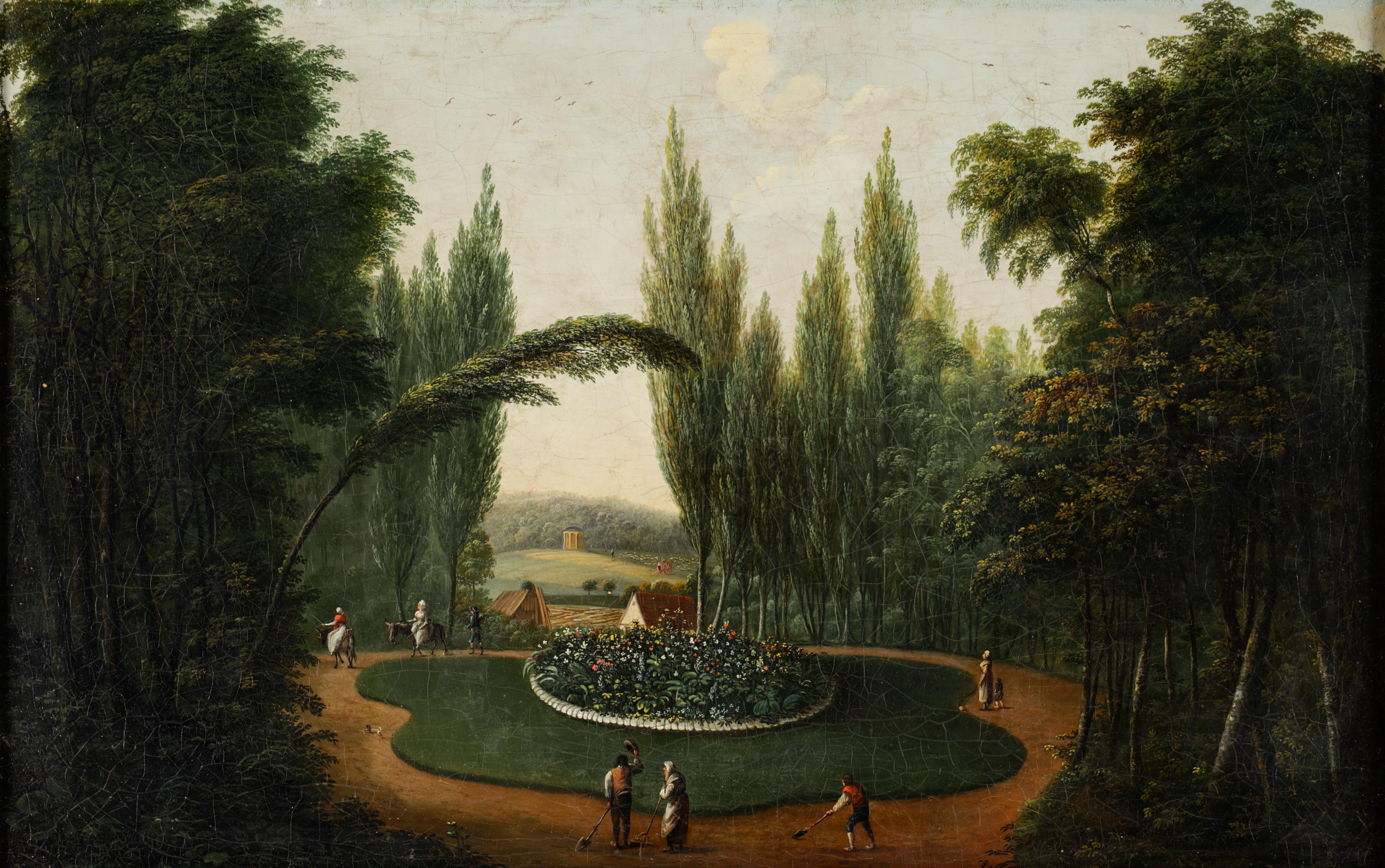
The park around 1800

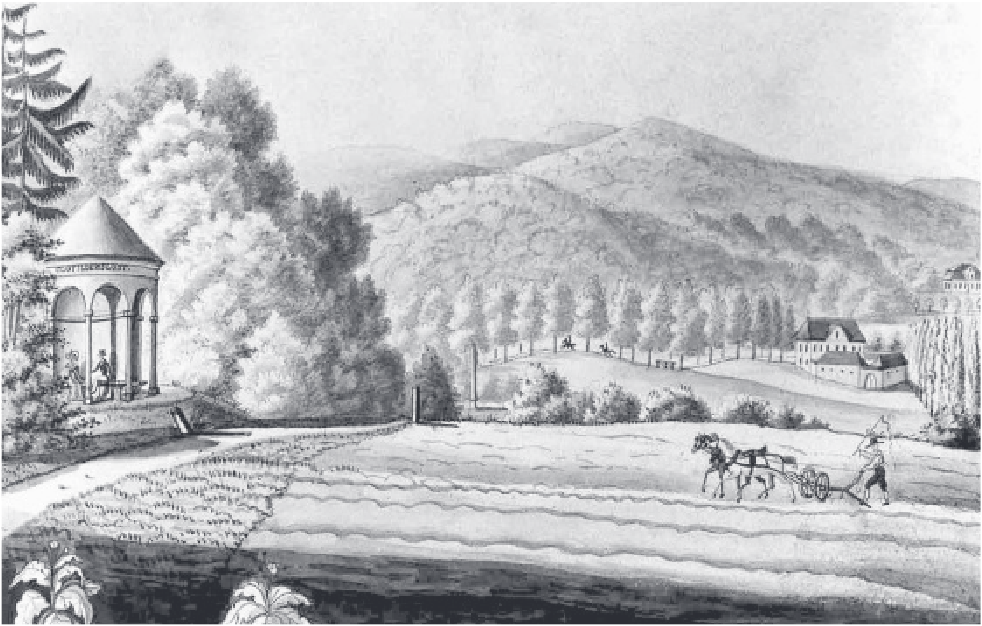
The Clotildenslust pavilion in the park around 1826

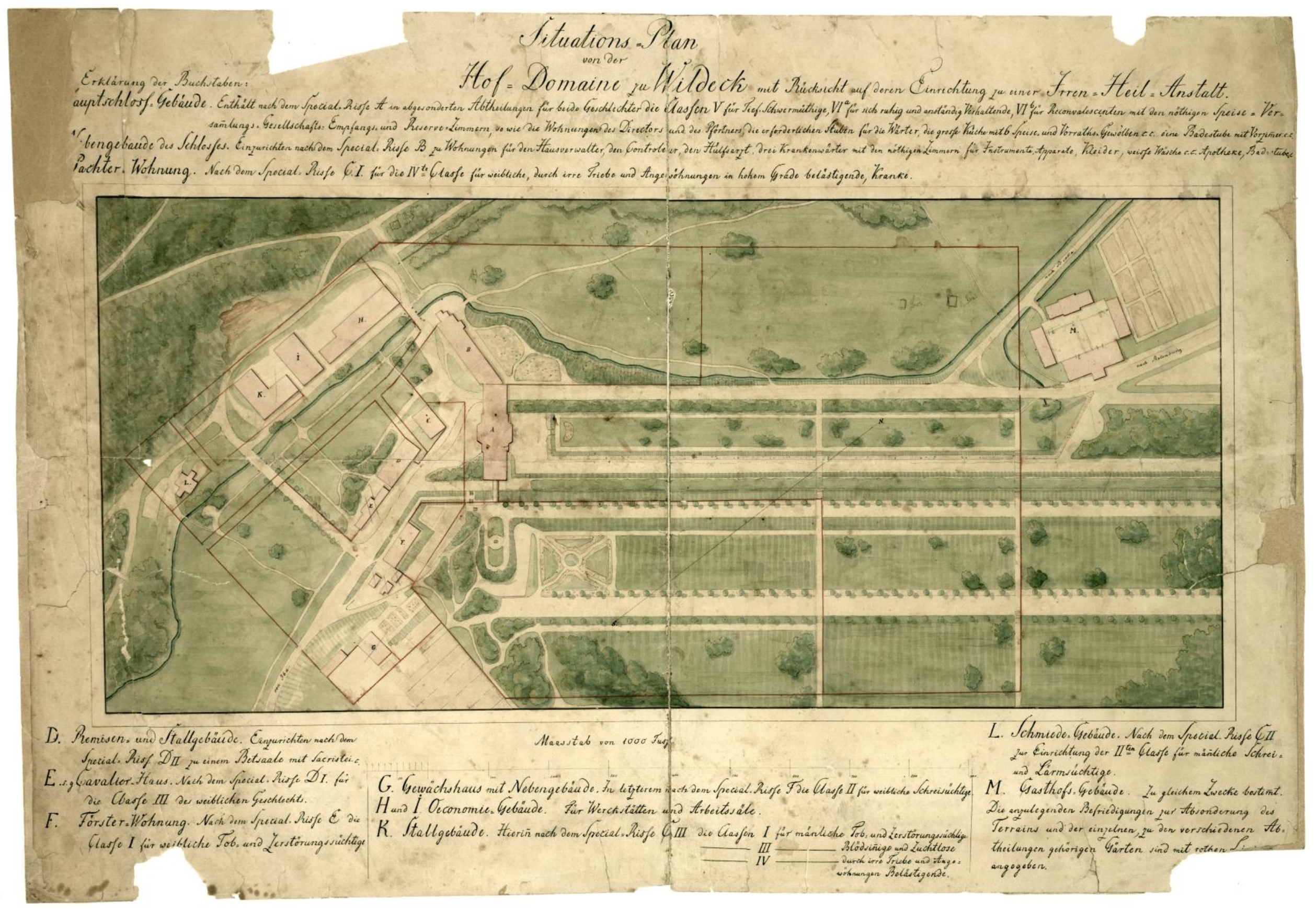
Plan of the palace and its surrounding gardens in 1839

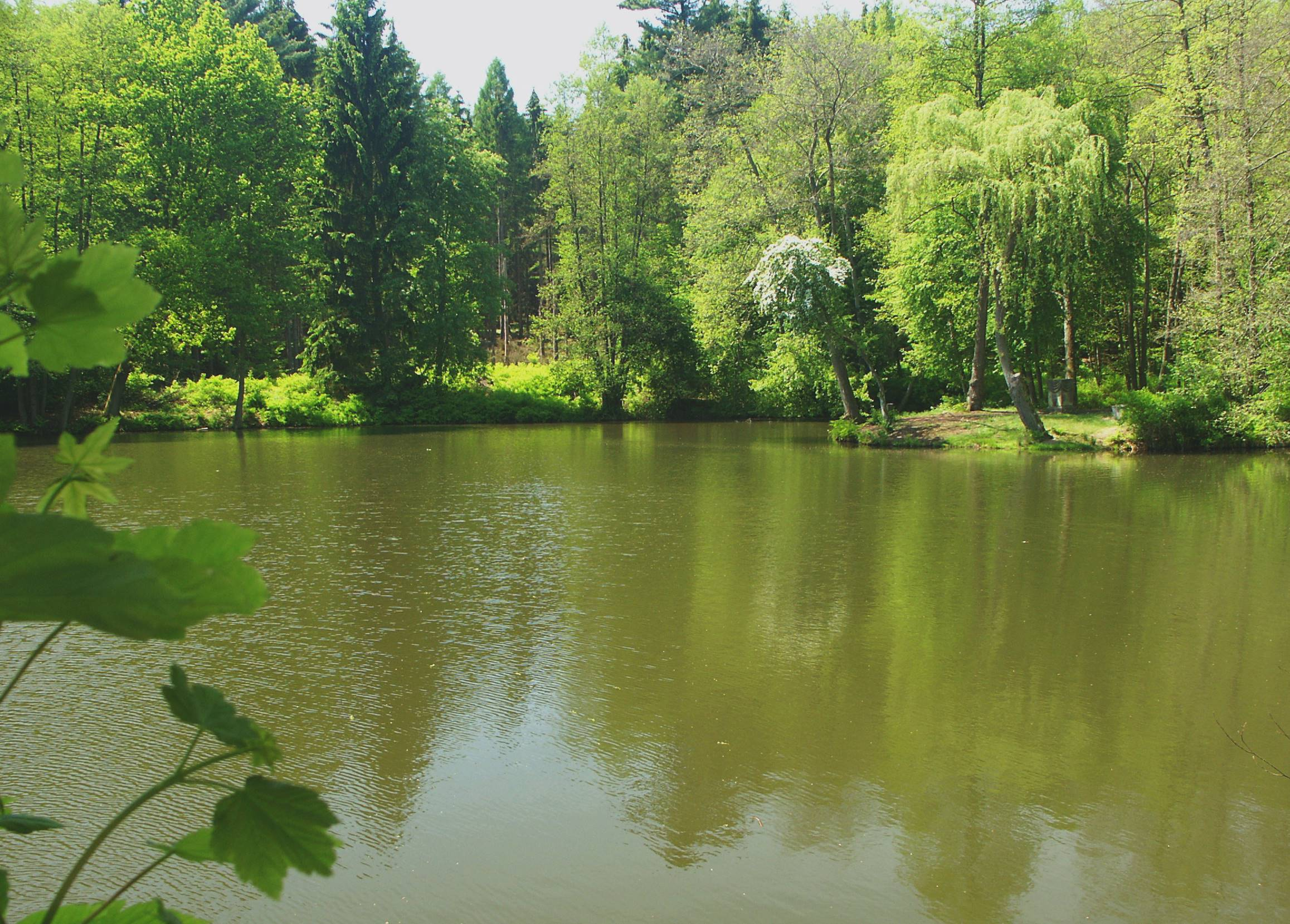
The pond with the island

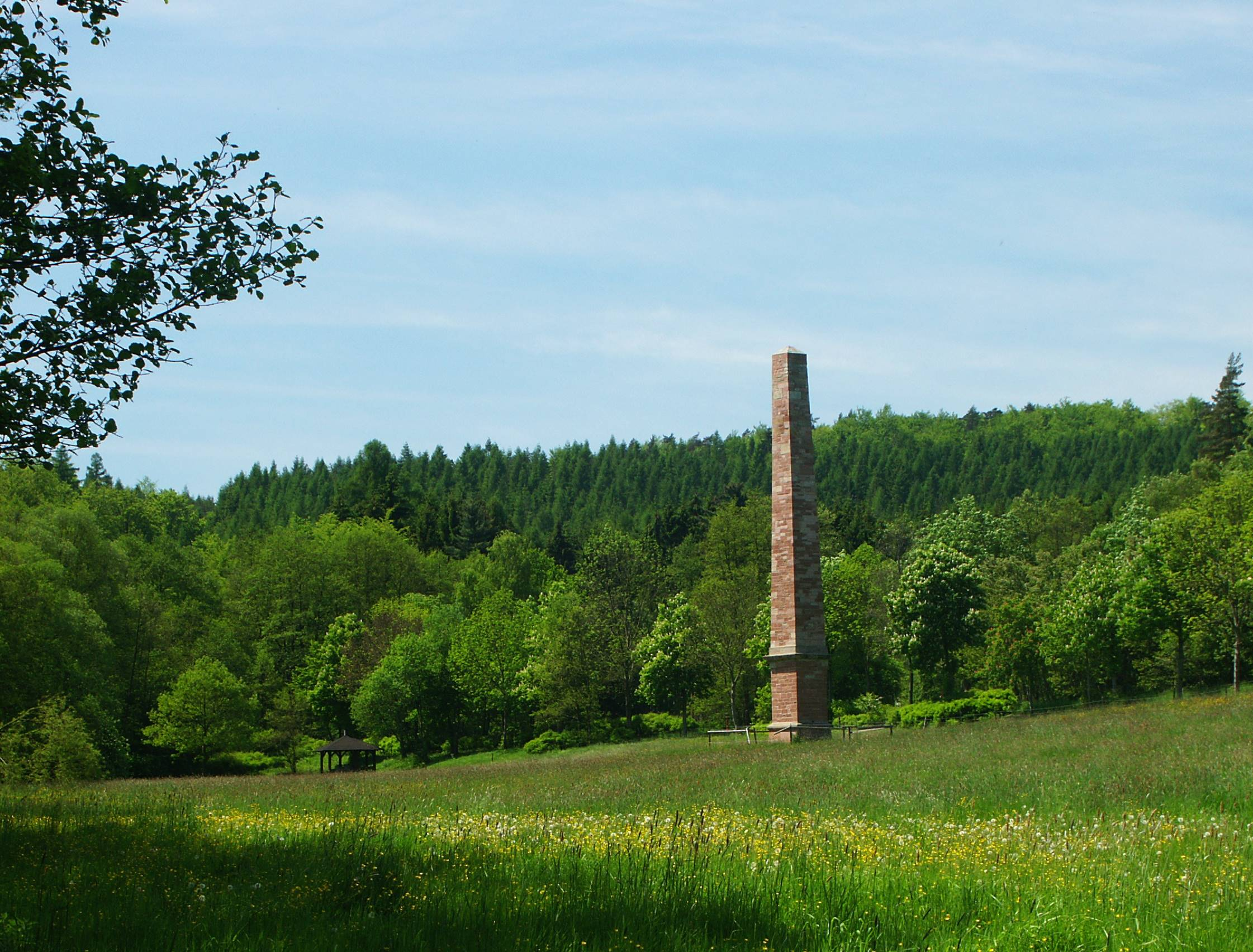
The obelisk
