= Princess Hedwig of Hesse-Rotenburg =

Hedwig
- Duchess of Bouillon
- Born: 26 June 1748; Landgrave's Palace, Germany
- Died: 27 May 1801 (aged 52); Paris, France
- Spouse: Jacques Léopold de La Tour d'Auvergne (m. 1766)
- House: Hesse-Rotenburg
- Father: Constantine, Landgrave of Hesse-Rotenburg
- Mother: Countess Sophia of Starhemberg

Princess Hedwig of Hesse-Rheinfels-Rotenburg (Hedwig Marie Christine; 26 June 1748 – 27 May 1801) was a German princess and Duchess of Bouillon by marriage. She is sometimes known as Marie Hedwige.

== Early life ==
Born at the Landgrave's Palace in Rotenburg an der Fulda to Constantine, Hereditary Prince of Hesse-Rotenburg and his wife, Countess Sophia Theresia Hedwigis Eva of Starhemberg (1722-1773), widow of William Hyacinth, Prince of Nassau-Siegen and sister of Georg Adam, Prince of Starhemberg. She was the couple's third child. She had ten other siblings including the future Charles Emmanuel, Landgrave of Hesse-Rotenburg, named after their uncle Charles Emmanuel III of Sardinia.

== Biography ==
On 17 July 1766 at Carlsburg she married Jacques Léopold de La Tour d'Auvergne, Prince de Turenne and heir to the sovereign Duchy of Bouillon. His parents were Godefroy de La Tour d'Auvergne, Duke of Bouillon, and Princess Louise de Lorraine-Harcourt-Marsan of the House of Guise.

Her husband lived in Navarre prior to the revolution and succeeded his father in 1792. During the collapse of the ancien régime, the duchy of Bouillon was taken from him in 1794 and absorbed into France in October 1795. However, in 1800, he recovered the duchy but was obliged to pay off debts of 3 million livres. The duchy was incorporated in the new Kingdom of the Netherlands in 1815.

The Duchess of Bouillon died childless in Paris on 27 May 1801.

== Ancestry ==
Ancestors of Princess Hedwig of Hesse-Rotenburg

16. Ernest, Landgrave of Hesse-Rheinfels-Rotenburg
8. William, Landgrave of Hesse-Rotenburg
17. Countess Marie Eleonore von Solms-Hohensolms
4. Ernest Leopold, Landgrave of Hesse-Rotenburg
18. Ferdinand Karl, Count of Löwenstein-Wertheim-Rochefort
9. Countess Maria Anna of Löwenstein-Wertheim-Rochefort
19. Countess Anna Maria zu Fürstenberg-Heiligenberg
2. Constantine, Landgrave of Hesse-Rotenburg
20. Ferdinand Carl, Count of Löwenstein-Wertheim-Rochefort =18
10. Maximilian Karl, Prince of Löwenstein-Wertheim-Rochefort
21. Countess Anna Maria zu Fürstenberg-Heiligenberg =19
5. Countess Eleonore of Löwenstein-Wertheim-Rochefort
22. Mathias Khuen, Count von Lichtenberg und Gandegg
11. Countess Maria Polyxena Khuen von Lichtenberg
23. Countess Susanna von Meggau und Kreutzen
1. Princess Hedwig of Hesse-Rheinfels-Rotenburg
24. Count Conrad Balthasar von Starhemberg
12. Count Franz Ottokar von Starhemberg
25. Countess Katharina Franziska Cavriani
6. Count Conrad Sigismund von Starhemberg
26. Johann Otto, Count von Rindsmaul
13. Countess Cecile Clara von Rindsmaul
27. Countess Eleonora zu Dietrichstein
3. Countess Sophia von Starhemberg
28. Ferdinand Carl, Count of Löwenstein-Wertheim-Rochefort =18, =20
14. Maximilian Karl, Prince of Löwenstein-Wertheim-Rochefort =10
29. Countess Anna Maria zu Fürstenberg-Heiligenberg =19, =21
7. Countess Maria Leopoldine of Löwenstein-Wertheim-Rochefort
30. Mathias Khuen, Count von Lichtenberg und Gandegg =22
15. Countess Maria Polyxena Khuen von Lichtenberg =11
31. Countess Susanna von Meggau und Kreutzen =23
