= Constantine, Landgrave of Hesse-Rotenburg =

Constantine
- Landgrave of Hesse-Rotenburg
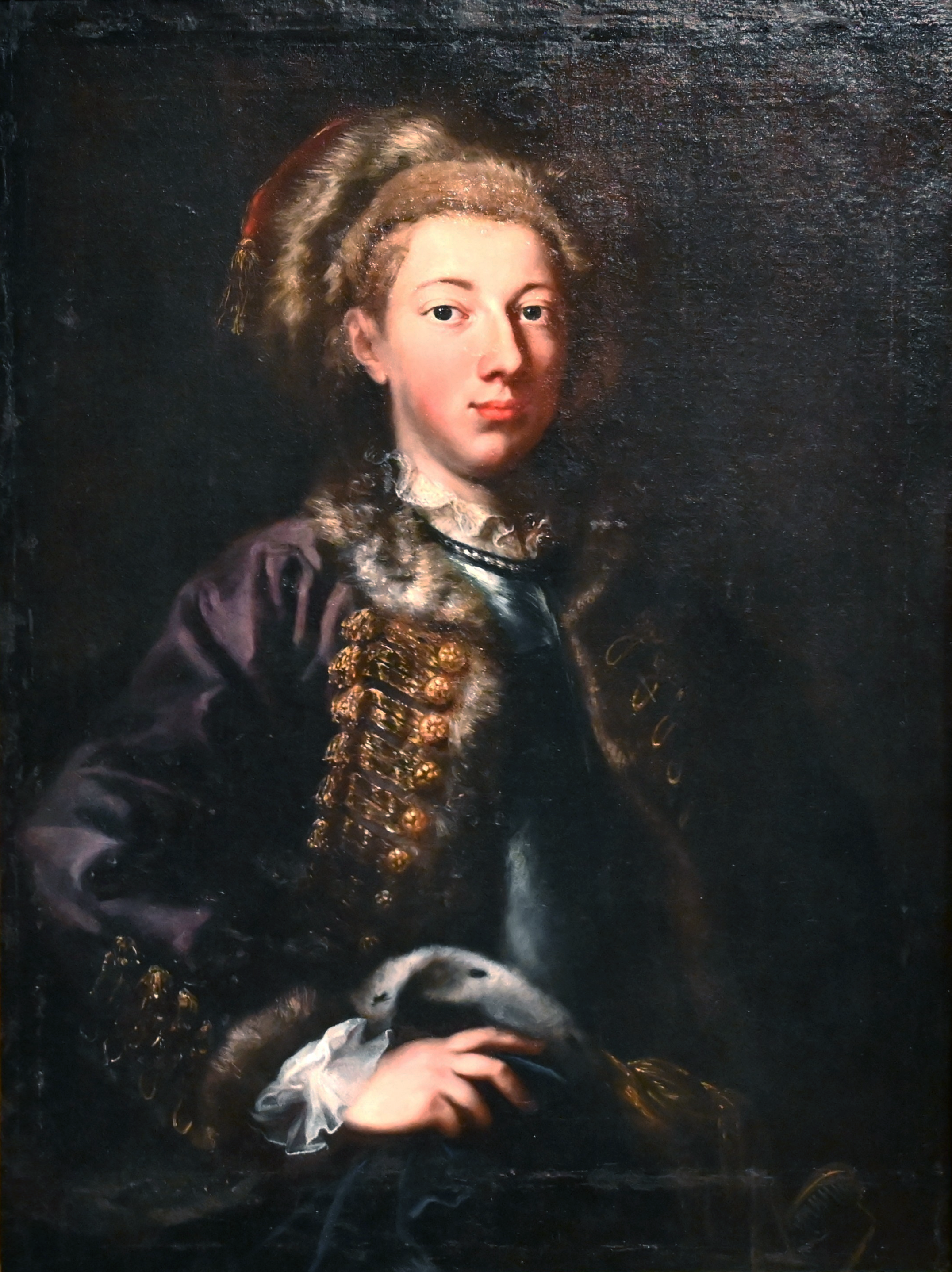
- Born: 24 May 1716; Rotenburg, Germany
- Died: 30 December 1778 (aged 62); Schloss Blumenstein (Wildeck), Germany
- Spouse: Countess Sophia von Starhemberg; Comtesse Jeanne de Bombelles
- Issue: Charles Emmanuel, Landgrave of Hesse-Rotenburg; Hedwig, Duchess of Bouillon; Wilhelmina Maria
- House: Hesse-Rotenburg
- Father: Ernest Leopold, Landgrave of Hesse-Rotenburg
- Mother: Eleonore of Löwenstein-Wertheim-Rochefort

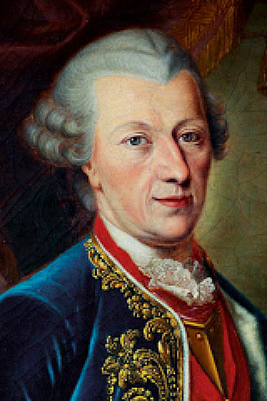
Constantin, Landgraf of Hessen-Rotenburg

Constantine of Hessen-Rotenburg (May 24, 1716 in Rotenburg – December 30, 1778 in Schloss Blumenstein (Wildeck)) was Landgrave of Hesse-Rotenburg from 1749 until his death.

== Early life ==
Born into the House of Hesse, cadet line of an ancient House of Brabant, Constantine was the son of Landgrave Ernest Leopold, Landgrave of Hesse-Rotenburg and his wife, Princess Eleonore of Löwenstein-Wertheim-Rochefort.

== First marriage ==
He married in 1745 with Countess Marie Sophia Theresia Hedwig Eva von Starhemberg (1722-1773), daughter of the Imperial envoy Count Konrad Sigmund von Starhemberg (1689–1727) and his wife, Princess Leopoldine von Löwenstein-Wertheim-Rochefort (1689-1763). She was elder sister of Georg Adam, Prince of Starhemberg, Imperial envoy to France, and widow of William Hyacinth, Prince of Nassau-Siegen.

He had 8 children from his first marriage, including :

- Charles Emmanuel (1746–1812), his successor.
- Clementina (1747–1801).
- Hedwig (1748–1801), married Jacques Léopold de La Tour d'Auvergne, Duke of Bouillon.
- Christian (1750–1782), Canon of Cologne and Strasbourg.
- Charles Constantine (1752-1821), a supporter of the French Revolution, better known as Citoyen Hesse.
- Antonia (1753–1823), a nun.
- Wilhelmina Maria (1755–1816), a provostess in Essen Abbey.
- Ernst (1758–1784), married Christine Wilhelmina Henriette Sophia von Bardeleben (1765-1835).

== Second marriage ==
When his first wife died in 1773, on 17 May 1775 he remarried with the Countess Johanna Henriette de Bombelles (1751-1822), younger sister of Marc Marie, Marquis de Bombelles. She was born as daughter of Count François Henri de Bombelles (1681-1760), guardian of the Duke of Orleans, and his wife, Genevieve Charlotte de Bradins de la Moisiere (b. 1727).

As her family didn't belong to the small circle of reigning of former reigning families, their marriage was treated as morganatic and upon marriage she received the title of Countess von Reichenberg. The couple had no children. After becoming a widow, she married again, to Louis Le Tellier de Souvre, Marquis de Louvois (d. 1785). They also didn't have children.

== Reign ==
Under Constantine, Hesse-Wanfried was in 1755 returned to Hesse-Rotenburg after the death of Christian of Hesse-Wanfried. Hesse-Rotenburg, which had been divided in 1648, was now again reunited and remained so until the Treaty of Lunéville in 1801.

He became a knight in the Order of the Golden Fleece in 1759.

== Death ==
Landgrave Constantin died on 30 December 1778 in Schloss Blumenstein in Wildeck, at the age of 62. His body was buried in the Minoritenkiche, Fritzlar, Schwalm-Eder-Kreis, Hesse, Germany, while his first wife Sophia was buried in Strassbourg, France.

Constantine, Landgrave of Hesse-Rotenburg House of Hesse Born: 24 May 1716 Died: 30 December 1778
Preceded by Ernst Leopold	Landgrave of Hesse-Rotenburg; 1749–1778	Succeeded by Charles Emmanuel
Preceded by Christian	Landgrave of Hesse-Wanfried-Rheinfels; 1755–1778	Succeeded by Charles Emmanuel
