= Fürstliche Bibliothek Corvey =

Library in Germany

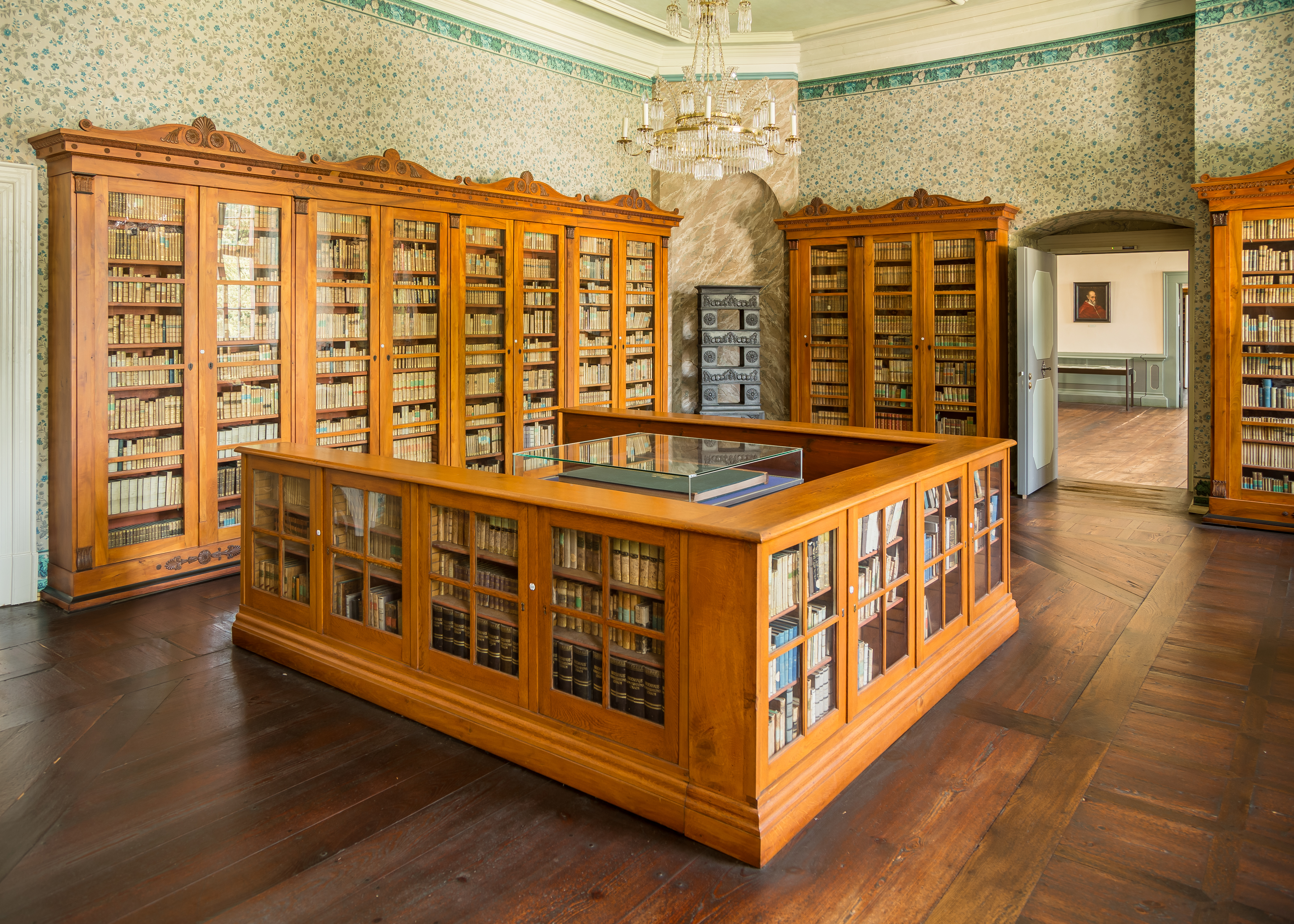
- Room in the Bibliothek Corvey, 2015
- 51°46′39″N 9°24′32″E
- Location: Höxter, Germany

Other information
- Website: www.schloss-corvey.de/de/corvey/historisch/bibliotheken/

The Fürstliche Bibliothek Corvey (English: Corvey Library) is a princely library in the Princely Abbey of Corvey, a former Benedictine abbey, near Höxter in North Rhine-Westphalia, Germany. It consists of around 74,000 volumes and is one of the largest and most valuable private libraries in Germany. The library houses one of the world's largest collections of Romantic literature (and especially strong in the period after 1815) and the largest collection in the world of "popular fiction in English between 1798 and 1834".

Stephen C. Behrendt, the George Holmes Distinguished Professor of English at the University of Nebraska–Lincoln, has praised the Corvey's "vast archive" of "uncommon, scarce, and even unique materials" which will assist scholars researching "British Romantic and early Victorian literary culture".

== History ==
Victor Amadeus, Landgraf of Hesse-Rotenburg (1779–1834), who was the Prince of Corvey from 1815 and Duke of Ratibor from 1821, and his wife Elisabeth (Elise), the Princess of Hohenlohe-Langenburg (1790–1830), were both bibliophiles and founded the library in the early 19th century. Their descendants and successors have been the owners of Corvey Castle and its library until the present day.

During the reign of Viktor I, Duke of Ratibor, the poet August Heinrich Hoffmann von Fallersleben (1798–1874), who was known for writing a stanza of the German national anthem, served as the Corvey's librarian in the last years of his life from 1860 to 1874.

== The collection ==
This library houses one of the largest collections of Romantic-era literature in the world. Thanks to the "eccentric buying policy" of the library's founder, Victor Amadeus, and his wife, it also contains a collection of books which were usually missing in other aristocratic or publicly owned libraries of that era: popular novels. That genre of books were in that period regarded as worthless ephemera, to be read by ordinary people and then cast aside. The Corvey's unique collection of popular novels were published in the years 1798–1834 and were mostly in the English language. It included not only rare books but several unique volumes.

Victor Amadeus' focus was more generally on belles-lettres, including works that some have regarded as a more "trivial" kind: "novels, tales, travel literature, biographies, memoirs, and drama". His concentration on more "popular" books has resulted in a collection with many books that are "simply not to be found in other significant libraries" of Europe, Great Britain or America.

In a letter in 1863 Hoffmann von Fallersleben described these strengths of the library as "Krebbschaden unserer Bibliothek" (cancerous damage to our library) and supplemented the collection by adding costly literary editions and works of German literature while not disposing of the popular fiction.

The library building consists of fifteen halls and has been outfitted with 200 bookcases made of different types of wood such as walnut, curly maple and cherry. The building was designed in the style of the Biedermeier and late classicism.

== Projekt Corvey ==
After the death of Victor Amadeus and his wife, the library's unique collection lay mostly forgotten until the 1980s when scholars came across it and realised its "historical and literary significance". The University of Paderborn established the Projekt Corvey (English, "Corvey Project") which started cataloguing the collection and produced several extensive series of microfiches on the library's holdings of belles lettres, travel works, history, and biography, enabling scholars across Germany and the world to study the library's holdings without having to travel to Corvey.

In the English speaking world, several Corvey based research projects have been set up, including the Corvey Project at the Sheffield Hallam University, Cardiff Corvey at Cardiff University, and the Corvey Poets Project at the University of Nebraska. One result of Sheffield Halley Corvey's research has been the rediscovery of over 400 women writers of popular literature, including Eliza Parsons, Mary Meeke and Charlotte Dacre, who were hugely popular in their time but, unlike Jane Austen, Ann Radcliffe and Maria Edgeworth who wrote in very different genres and styles, had since been largely forgotten.
