= Fanny von Starhemberg =

Austrian politician and noblewoman (1875–1943)

Princess Franziska von Starhemberg
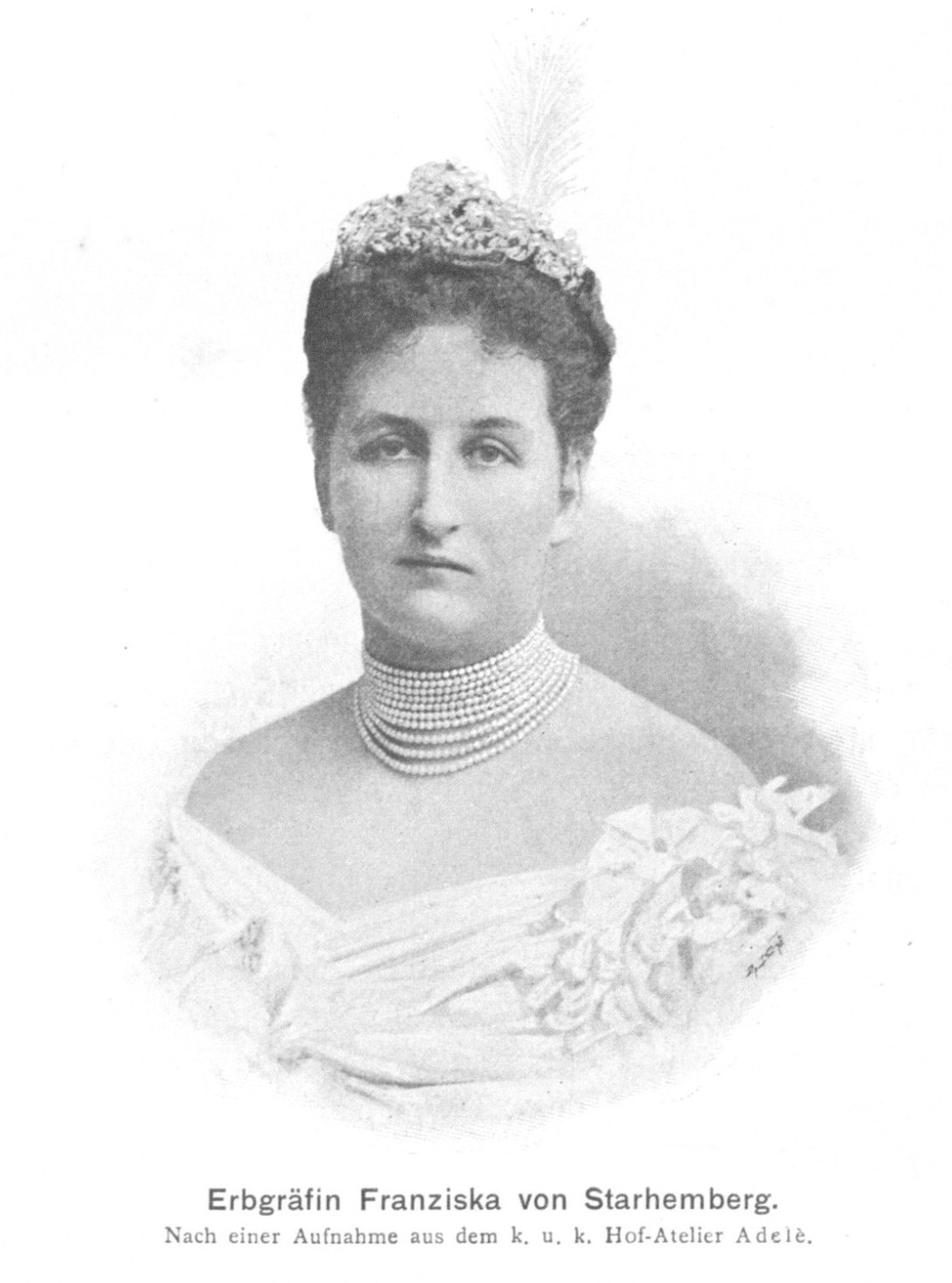
- Franziska von Starhemberg in 1901
- Born: 24 October 1875
- Died: 27 April 1943 (aged 67)
- Occupation: Politician

Princess Franziska von Starhemberg (German: Franziska Fürstin von Starhemberg, also known as Fanny Starhemberg or Princess Fanny Starhemberg; 24 October 1875 - 27 April 1943), was an Austrian politician of the Christian Social Party. She was the mother of Heimwehr leader and Austrian Vice-Chancellor Ernst Rüdiger von Starhemberg.

== Life ==
She was born in Vienna as Franziska Gräfin Larisch von Moennich, the daughter of Eugen Graf Larisch von Moennich (1835-1880) and his wife, Countess Gabriele Deym von Stritez (1847-1878). She thereby came from a Silesian Uradel Larisch family which then ranked among the oldest and most prominent noble dynasties of Austria-Hungary. In 1898 she married Prince (Fürst) Ernst Rüdiger von Starhemberg (1861-1927), a large-scale landowner and scion of another very famous and even more prestigious aristocratic House of Starhemberg. The couple resided in Eferding, Upper Austria, where their eldest son Ernst Rüdiger von Starhemberg was born in 1899.

Her husband was a hereditary member of the Austrian House of Lords and in 1902 became a deputy of the Upper Austrian Landtag diet in Linz, while she committed herself to the Austrian Red Cross and had several honorary positions, among them the chair of the Upper Austrian Red Cross Women's Association from 1916. Franziska von Starhemberg became interested in politics herself, first as founder and head of the Upper Austrian Catholic Women's Organisation (Katholische Frauenorganisation), from 1919 also as a board member of the Christian Social Party (Christlichsoziale Partei) under Ignaz Seipel. Upon the dissolution of the Austro-Hungarian Empire and the emergence of the First Austrian Republic, however, her ambitions to become a candidate for the National Council were denied. Instead from 1920 to 1931 she was a member of the Federal Council (Bundesrat), the upper house of the Austrian Parliament.

During the rise of Austrofascism in the early 1930s, she alienated from both the Christian Social Party and her son Ernst Rüdiger Starhemberg. Chancellor Engelbert Dollfuss provided her with a post at the League of Nations in 1934. Upon the Austrian Anschluss to Nazi Germany in 1938, Franziska Starhemberg was temporarily arrested and afterwards retired from public life. She died in the Czech Silesian spa town of Bad Darkau (present-day Darkov, part of Karviná).
