= Princely Abbey of Corvey =

Former abbey in North Rhine-Westphalia, Germany

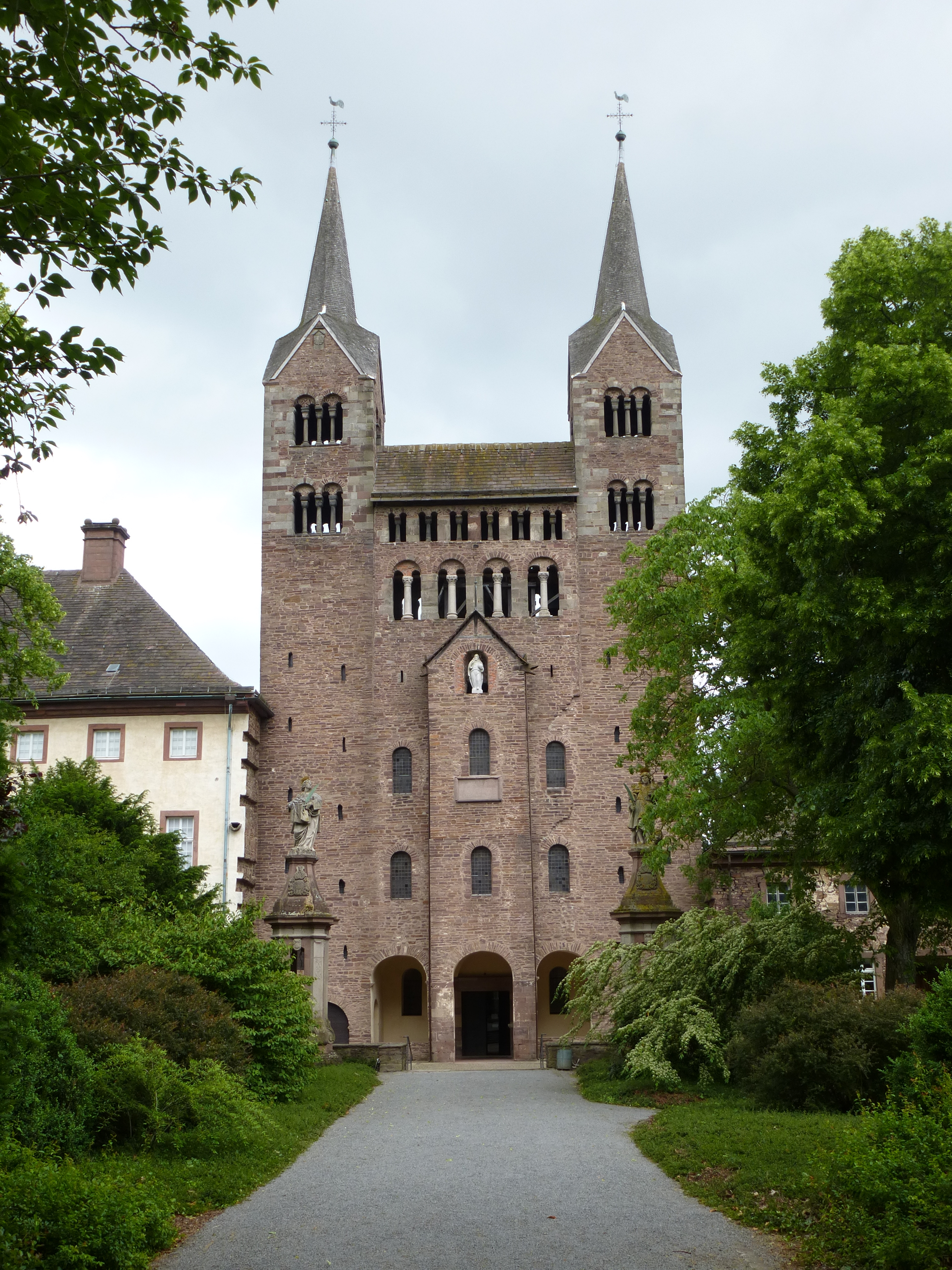
- The Westwork of Corvey Abbey

- Location within Germany Location within North Rhine-Westphalia

Religion
- Affiliation: Catholic
- Year consecrated: 844

Location
- Municipality: Höxter
- State: North Rhine-Westphalia
- Coordinates: 51°46′44″N 9°24′34″E

Architecture
- Style: Carolingian, High Romanesque, Baroque
- UNESCO World Heritage Site
- Official name: Carolingian Westwork and Civitas Corvey
- Type: Cultural
- Criteria: ii, iii, iv
- Designated: 2014 (38th session)
- Reference no.: 1447
- State Party: Germany
- Region: Europe and North America
- Property: 12 ha (30 acres)
- Buffer zone: 69 ha (170 acres)

Abbey church of Corvey

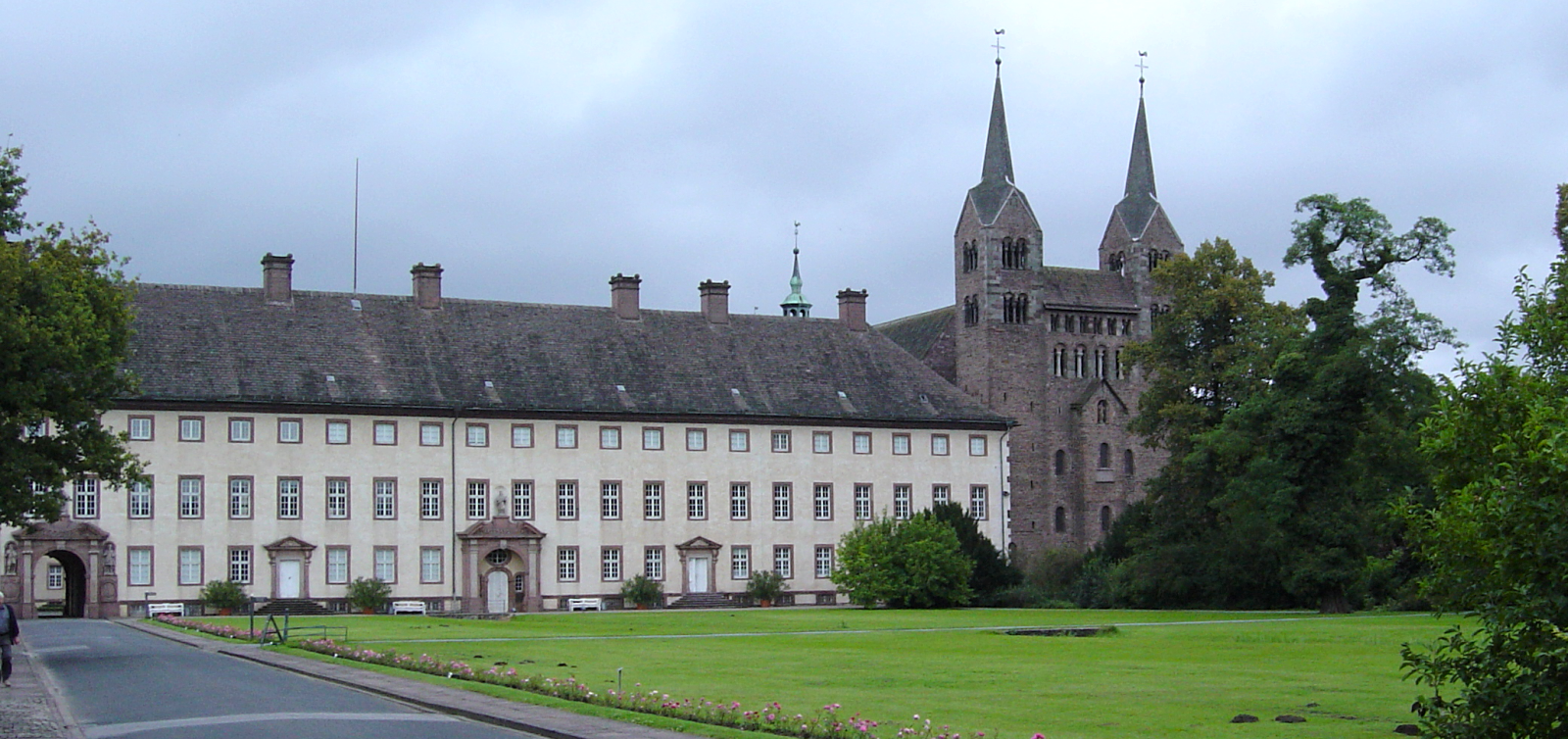
Corvey today

The Princely Abbey of Corvey (German: Fürststift Corvey or German: Fürstabtei Corvey) is a former Benedictine abbey and ecclesiastical principality now in North Rhine-Westphalia, Germany. It was one of the half-dozen self-ruling princely abbeys of the Holy Roman Empire from the Late Middle Ages until 1792 when Corvey was elevated to a prince-bishopric. Corvey, whose territory extended over a vast area, was in turn secularized in 1803 in the course of the German mediatisation and absorbed into the newly created Principality of Nassau-Orange-Fulda. Originally built in 822 and 885 and remodeled in the Baroque period, the abbey is an exceptional example of Carolingian architecture, the oldest surviving example of a westwork, and the oldest standing medieval structure in Westphalia. The original architecture of the abbey, with its vaulted hall and galleries encircling the main room, heavily influenced later western Romanesque and Gothic architecture. The inside of the westwork contains the only known wall paintings of ancient mythology with Christian interpretation in Carolingian times. The former abbey church was listed as a UNESCO World Heritage Site in 2014.

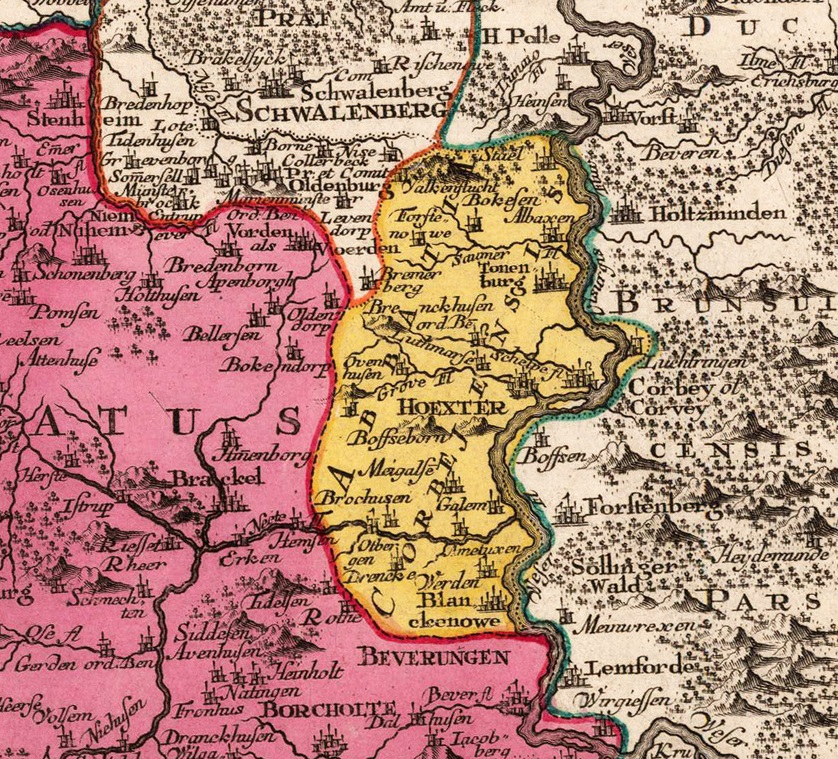
Territory of the Princely Abbey of Corvey in the 18th century

== History of the abbey ==
=== Foundation and early years ===
In the Saxon Wars which lasted more than thirty years after 772, Charlemagne, king of the Franks, was eventually victorious, adding the Saxon territory to his empire and starting the Christianisation of the Saxon people. To that end, bishoprics were established (at Hildesheim and Halberstadt). In addition, the idea of setting up an abbey in Saxony was first mooted during Charlemagne's reign. However, the plan was only implemented under his son, Emperor Louis the Pious, who announced the creation of an abbey east of the river Weser at a synod in Paderborn in 815. This was located at a place named Hethis. Although there is some uncertainty over the exact location, it is today thought to be near Neuhaus im Solling. The first monks arrived in 816 from the Benedictine abbey from Corbie Abbey in Picardy. They set up a Probstei, a subsidiary of the motherhouse. Due to the inappropriate location chosen, the monks chose to move in 822 – to the current location near what was then called Villa Huxori. The new house became known as Nova Corbeia (Latin for the "new Corbie"; Old German: Corvey pronounced [ˈkɔʁvaɪ]).

The first abbot of Corvey was a cousin of Charlemagne, Adalard of Corbie. Ansgar, who later became the "Apostle of Scandinavia", founded the abbey school in 823. The abbey library was established with works from Corbie, augmented by the output of the local scriptorium. In 826, Corvey became an independent abbey, dedicated to Saint Stephen. In 833, it was granted the right of coinage within the Franconian realm, as the first place east of the Rhine.

In 836, the remains of Saint Vitus were gifted to Corvey by the abbey of St Denis near Paris. Saint Vitus now became the patron saint of the Saxons. Since he was also one of the Fourteen Holy Helpers, his veneration was very popular in the Middle Ages and Corvey became a destination for pilgrims. Other gifts and donations by individuals made Corvey one of the richest abbeys in Central Europe and made possible ambitious building projects. Its position as Reichsabtei meant that its abbot was answerable directly to the emperor in secular matters.

The first stone church was consecrated in 844. In 873–885, the Westwerk that is still extant today was constructed.

Corvey thus became "one of the most privileged Carolingian monastic sanctuaries in the 9th-century Duchy of Saxony". It soon became famous for its school, which produced many celebrated scholars, among them the 10th-century Saxon historian Widukind of Corvey, author of Res gestae Saxonicae. From its cloisters went forth a stream of missionaries who evangelised Northern Europe.

The site of the abbey, where the east-west route called the Hellweg crossed the Weser, was of some strategic importance and assured its economic and cultural importance. The abbey's historian H. H. Kaminsky estimates that the royal entourage visited Corvey at least 110 times before 1073, occasions for the issuance of charters.

=== Imperial rights granted ===
A diploma granted by Otto I in 940, the first of its kind, established the abbot, Folcmar, in a new kind of setting. The abbot was granted bannus – powers of enforcement – over the population of peasants that were to seek refuge in the fortress built in the monastery's lands; in return they were expected to maintain its structure, under the abbot's supervision. The workforce under monastic protection was drawn from three pagi, under the jurisdiction of four counts, who, however, were to have no rights to demand castlework from them.

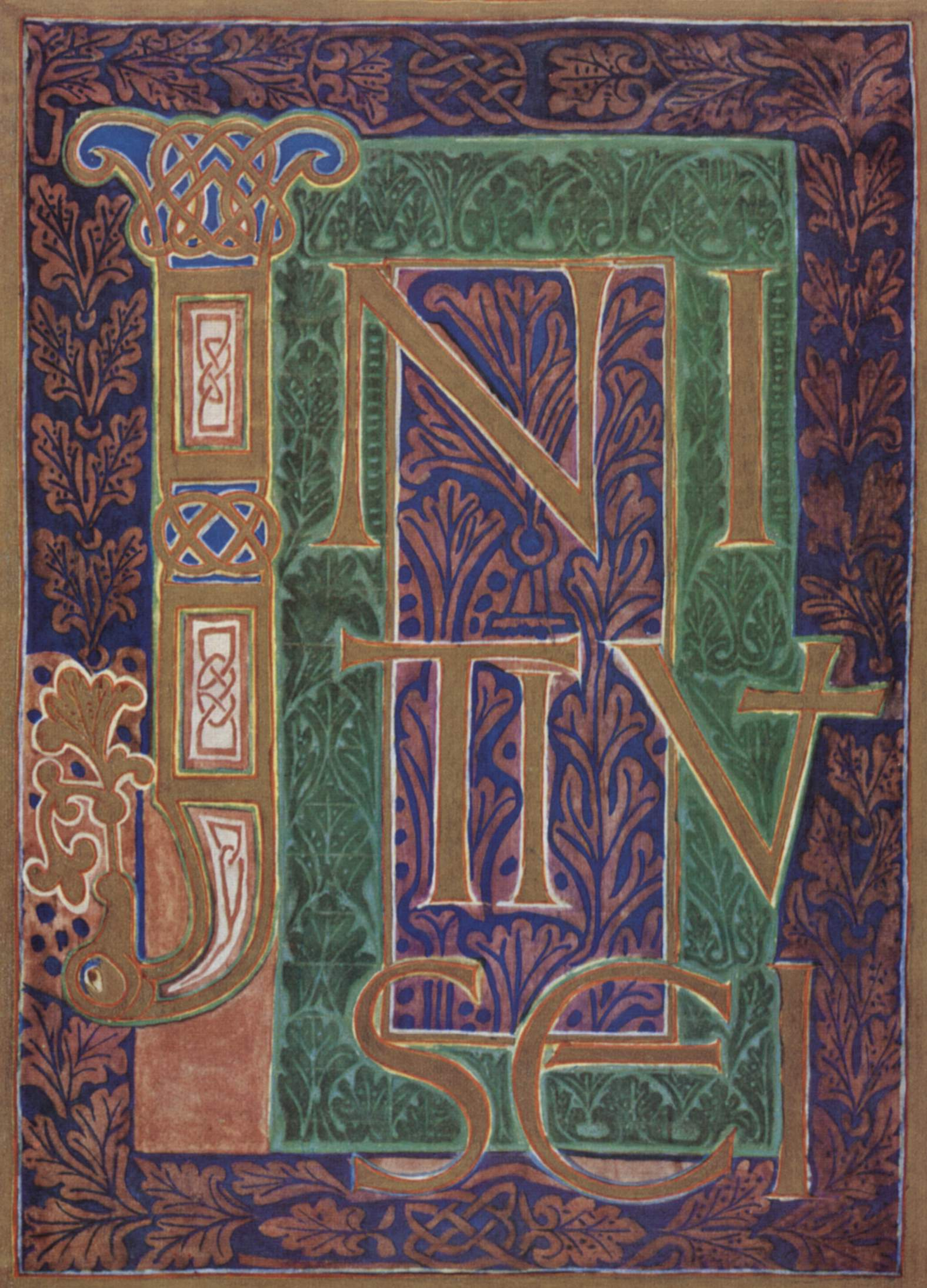
Initial page of the Wernigerode Gospels. A 10th-century book illumination from the scriptorium of Corvey Abbey, now in the Morgan Library & Museum in New York.

=== Strife and decline ===
In the Investiture Controversy, the abbot of Corvey took a stand with the Saxon nobles against Henry IV, Holy Roman Emperor. Its abbot Markward (served 1081–1107), "without doubt one of the most important abbots of the thousand-year history of the abbey" (Kaminsky), and his successor Erkenbert (1107–1128) saw the abbey through the critical period.

The abbey also participated in attempts to reform the Catholic Church during the 11th century. It was the dominant theological centre in the region and established numerous subsidiary abbeys.

A final period of prosperity followed under the leadership of Wibald (abbot from 1146–1158). At that time, the Westwerk was reconstructed in the High Romanesque style, and the Carolingian three-tower set-up was replaced with twin towers. By the mid-12th century, a substantial town (also named Corvey) had grown up around the abbey.

In 1265, the neighbouring town of Höxter, jealous of its nearby rival and its Weser bridge, allied itself with the Bishop of Paderborn and their troops destroyed the town of Corvey and damaged the abbey. The town never recovered and over the following decades reverted to a small village. This event marked the beginning of the long period of decline of the abbey.

The Reformation threatened Corvey as it did the other ecclesiastical territories in north-west Germany but the princely abbey did survive somewhat precariously as a self-ruling principality at the border of Protestant Brunswick and Hesse-Kassel. From the mid-16th century onward, the prince-abbot and his monks ran the administration in cooperation with a partly Protestant assembly consisting of three noble families, one town (Höxter) and a prelate. The prince-abbot, who had a seat and vote in the Reichstag as a member of the College of Ruling Princes, took only a modest part in imperial affairs, while the home affairs of the abbey were limited to little more than gentry-like estate management.

In 1508, books 1–6 of Tacitus' Annals were discovered at the abbey by Giovanni Angelo Arcimboldi (future Archbishop of Milan).

In 1634, during the Thirty Years War the abbey building was sacked by imperial troops who also laid siege to Höxter. It was later demolished. Only the Westwerk remained.

=== Reconstruction ===
It took decades for the local area to recover from the devastation of the war. After Christoph Bernhard von Galen, Bishop of Münster became prince and administrator of the abbey in 1665, reconstruction began. The Carolingian church was replaced by a Gothic building, with the exception of the Westwerk. Under von Galen's successors Christoph von Bellinghausen (1678–1696), Florenz von der Felde (1696–1714) and Maximilian von Horrich (1714–1722) the other substantial Baroque buildings still there today were erected.

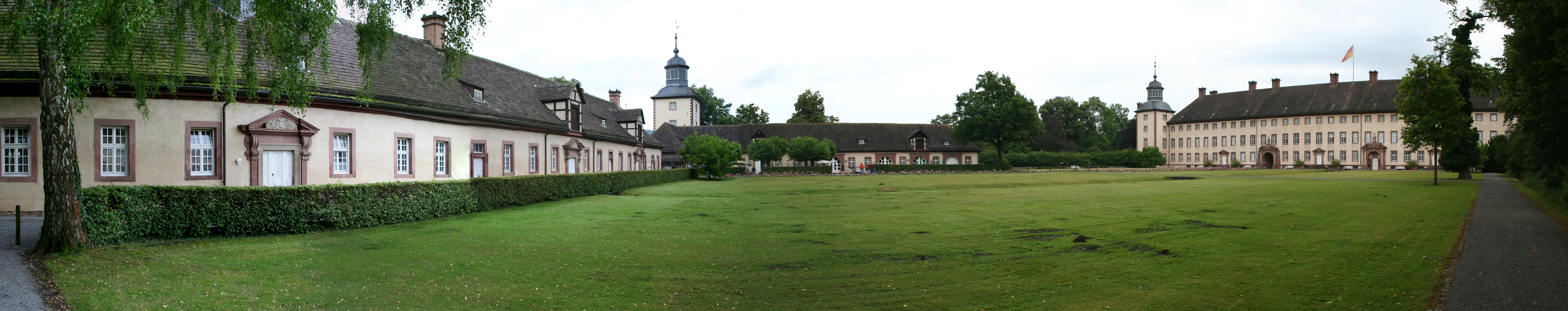
Courtyard of Corvey Abbey

== Prince-Bishopric of Corvey ==
In 1792, Corvey ceased to be a Benedictine abbey and was raised by pope Pius VI to the status of a prince-bishopric. Theodor von Brabeck (abbot/bishop 1776–94) and Ferdinand von Lüninck (bishop 1794–1825, also bishop of Munster 1821–1825) were the last ecclesial princes at Corvey.

In 1803, the Prince-Bishopric of Corvey was secularized under Napoleonic administration and became briefly part of the Principality of Nassau-Orange-Fulda. In 1807, it went to Jérôme Bonaparte's Kingdom of Westphalia. After the Congress of Vienna, Corvey fell to Prussia in 1815. As compensation for lost territory west of the Rhine, it was awarded to Victor Amadeus, the Landgrave of Hesse-Rotenburg, in 1820.

While Corvey had ceased to exist as a political state in 1803, it continued to exist as a diocese until 1825.

== Schloss Corvey ==
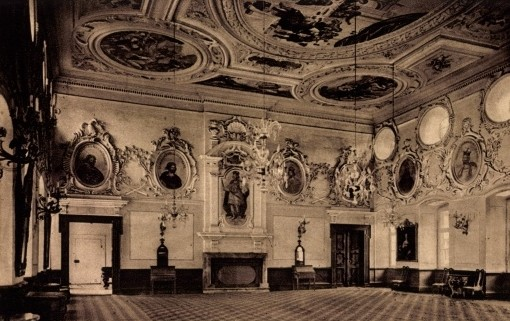
The Kaisersaal of Corvey Abbey

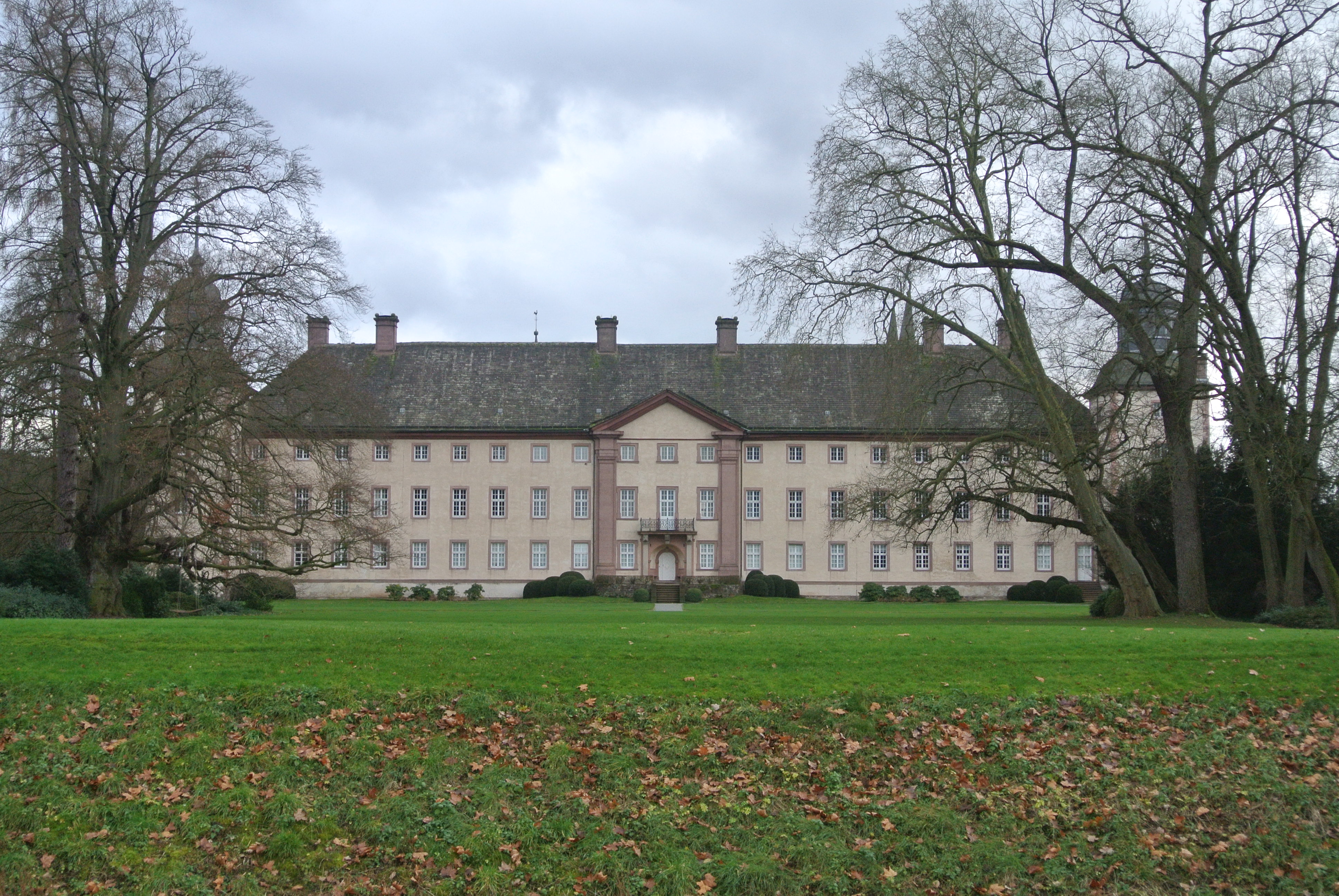
Schloss Corvey viewed from the north

Landgrave Victor Amadeus rebuilt the abbey buildings as a Schloss (palace). In 1834, the property fell to Victor von Hohenlohe-Schillingfürst, a member of the House of Hohenlohe. In 1840, he was granted the title Herzog von Ratibor und Fürst von Corvey (Duke of Ratibor and Prince of Corvey) by King Frederick William IV of Prussia. Since then, Schloss Corvey has remained property of the family.

=== Library ===
The famous abbey library has long since been dispersed, but the "princely library" (Fürstliche Bibliothek), an aristocratic family library, containing about 74,000 volumes, mainly in German, French, and English, with a tailing off circa 1834, survives in the Schloss. One striking feature of the collection is the large number of English Romantic novels, some in unique copies, for in Britain fiction was more often borrowed than bought, and was read extensively in the lending libraries. The poet and author of the Deutschlandlied, August Heinrich Hoffmann von Fallersleben, worked here as librarian from 1860 until his death in 1874. He is buried in the church graveyard.

== Today ==
The present owner of the palace is Viktor, 5th Duke of Ratibor and 5th Prince of Corvey, Prince of Hohenlohe-Schillingsfürst-Metternich-Sándor (b. 1964). The palace, library, and church are today open to the public.

== Bibliography ==
- Poeschke, Joachim (2002). Sinopien und Stuck im Westwerk der karolingischen Klosterkirche von Corvey [Sinopia and stuccowork in the westwork of the Carolingian monastery church of Corvey] (in German). Münster: Rhema-Verlag. ISBN 978-3-930454-34-1. OCLC 50130269. Also OCLC 491824148. Proceedings of a conference on the theme "Die karolingischen Stuckfiguren im Westwerk von Corvey : zur Frage ihrer Deutung [Carolingian stucco figures in the westwork of Corvey: on questions about their meaning]", held 1–3 Nov. 1996 at the Institut für Kunstgeschichte [Institute of art history], University of Münster.
