= Wildeck =

- Municipality
- Coat of arms

- Location of Wildeck within Hersfeld-Rotenburg district
- Interactive map of Wildeck
- Location within Germany Location within Hesse
- Coordinates: 50°57′N 09°59′E
- Country: Germany
- State: Hesse
- Admin. region: Kassel
- District: Hersfeld-Rotenburg
- Subdivisions: 5 districts

Government
  - Mayor (2020–26): Alexander Wirth (Ind.)

Area
  - Total: 39.93 km^{2} (15.42 sq mi)
- Elevation: 208–465 m (682–1,526 ft)

Population (2025-12-31)
  - Total: 4,650
  - Density: 116/km^{2} (302/sq mi)
- Time zone: UTC+01:00 (CET)
  - Summer (DST): UTC+02:00 (CEST)
- Postal codes: 36208
- Dialling codes: 06626
- Vehicle registration: HEF
- Website: www.wildeck.de

Wildeck (German pronunciation: [ˈvɪldɛk]) is a municipality in Hersfeld-Rotenburg district in northeastern Hesse, Germany lying right at the boundary with Thuringia, 54 km southeast of Kassel.

== Geography ==
=== Location ===
The community lies partly in the middle Werra valley, in the Berka-Gerstunger-Becken (basin) with its small side basins, the Obersuhler Becken and the Kleinenseer Bucht. This basin is surrounded by heights. In the southwest lies the Seulingswald, in the south the outliers of the Anterior Rhön, in the east the outliers of the Thuringian Forest and in the north the Richelsdorfer Hills, which belongs to the southern Werra Upland. The community lies partly in this last-named range.

The nearest major centres are Bad Hersfeld (some 25 km to the southwest) and Eisenach (some 25 km to the east). The lowest point in the community is In der Aue ("On the Floodplain") near Obersuhl at 208 m above sea level. The highest point is the Rotestock at 456 m above sea level.

=== Constituent communities ===
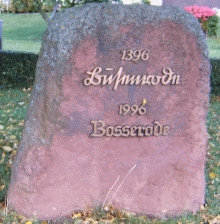
Bussenrode/Bosserode monument stone

The community's five Ortsteile are Obersuhl, Bosserode, Hönebach, Richelsdorf and Raßdorf.

=== Neighbouring communities ===
Wildeck borders in the north on the community of Nentershausen (in Hersfeld-Rotenburg) and the town of Sontra (in the Werra-Meißner-Kreis), in the east on the community of Gerstungen, in the southeast on the town of Berka/Werra, in the south on the communities of Dankmarshausen and Großensee (all four in Thuringia's Wartburgkreis) and the town of Heringen, in the southwest on the community of Friedewald and in the west on the community of Ronshausen (all three in Hersfeld-Rotenburg).

== History ==
The community's name stems from the Amt of Wildeck, to which some of today's constituent communities belonged, and which in the Middle Ages was under the Fulda Abbey's rule. The Amt seat lay at Wildeck Castle, which stood on the Schloßberg near Raßdorf.

In 1277, Richelsdorf had its first documentary mention when the Fulda Abbey temporarily relinquished the community to build a convent at St. Nicholas's Monastery (Nikolaikloster) in Eisenach, which was, however, never built. In 1325, the brothers Friedrich and Hermann von Colmatsch were enfeoffed with the Amt, in exchange for which today's constituent communities of Eisenach and Hötzelsroda went to St. Nicholas's Monastery. The fief passed in 1539 to the Landgraves of Hesse. After the family von Colmatsch had died out in 1562, the community passed to Hesse.

The craggy state boundary in the south and east still bears witness to the disputes between the Landgraves of Hesse and Thuringia and the Fulda Abbey, which lasted throughout the Middle Ages and on into modern times.

Coppermining in Wildeck was mentioned for the first time in 1460. At the Richelsdorf foundry, cobalt was also mined beginning in 1708, which raised the foundry's importance, as well as another's in Iba (nowadays an outlying centre of Bebra), causing the mining office of Sontra to move to Richelsdorf.

During the 18th century, the landgraves of Hesse-Rotenburg had their summer palace and gardens in Wildeck, Schloss Blumenstein.

Potash has been mined in the Wildeck region for over 100 years.

From 1945 to 1990, the community found itself right near the Inner German border. The station in Hönebach, a component of Wildeck, served as West German border crossing for rail transport. The crossing was open for trains travelling between the Soviet Zone of occupation in Germany (till 1949, thereafter the East German Democratic Republic, or West Berlin and the American zone of occupation (till 1949) and thereafter the West German Federal Republic of Germany. The traffic was subject to the Interzonal traffic regulations, that between West Germany and West Berlin followed the special regulations of the Transit Agreement (1972).

Within the framework of municipal reform, the new community of Wildeck came into being on 31 December 1971 through the merger of the above-named communities.

=== Population development ===
Data apply to community limits in each year named, and are in each case for 31 December

Year	1971	1979	1984	1989	1994	1996	2001	2002	2004	2005	2006
Inhabitants	6314	5729	5809	5877	6095	6092	6046	6003	5247	5198	5136

By November 2020, the population had declined to 4,980.

== Politics ==
=== Community council ===
As of 2022, the municipal council is chaired by Egon Bachmann of the Social Democratic Party of Germany, with the following members:

- Social Democratic Party of Germany: 10 members
- Christian Democratic Union of Germany: 4 members
- Free Voters: 6 members
- Alliance 90/The Greens: 2 members
- Free Democratic Party (Germany): 1 member

The municipal election held on 26 March 2006 yielded the following results:

Parties and voter communities		% 2006	Seats; 2006	% 2001	Seats; 2001
CDU	Christian Democratic Union of Germany	27.5	9	25.1	8
SPD	Social Democratic Party of Germany	49.0	15	56.8	17
FDP	Free Democratic Party	4.0	1	2.5	1
FWG	Freie Wählergemeinschaft	19.5	6	15.6	5
Total		100.0	31	100.0	31
Voter turnout in %		62.1		69.1	

=== Mayors ===
Mayoral elections are held every six years. The most recent mayors were:

- 2020–present: Alexander Wirth (independent)
- 2014-2020: Alexander Wirth (independent)
- 2003–2014: Jürgen Grau (independent)
- 1997–2003: Willi Müller (SPD)

== Economy and infrastructure ==
=== Transport ===
The community lies on Autobahn A 4 (Aachen–Görlitz), at interchanges 34 and 35. Furthermore, the community has at its disposal three halts (Obersuhl, Bosserode and Hönebach) on the Thüringer Bahn (railway) from Eisenach to Bebra.

=== Established businesses ===
- alsecco Bauchemische Produkte GmbH & Co KG – construction chemistry products, and a successor business to the Richelsdorfer foundry
- Betten Malsch GmbH – a leading German maker of medical care beds

== Culture and sightseeing ==
=== Buildings ===
- Rustic Baroque church in Richelsdorf
- Bosserode Evangelical church with winged altar and pietà
- Ruins of the Blumenstein hunting lodge
- Remains of the Blumenstein palace and gardens with pond and obelisk
Blumenstein hunting palace

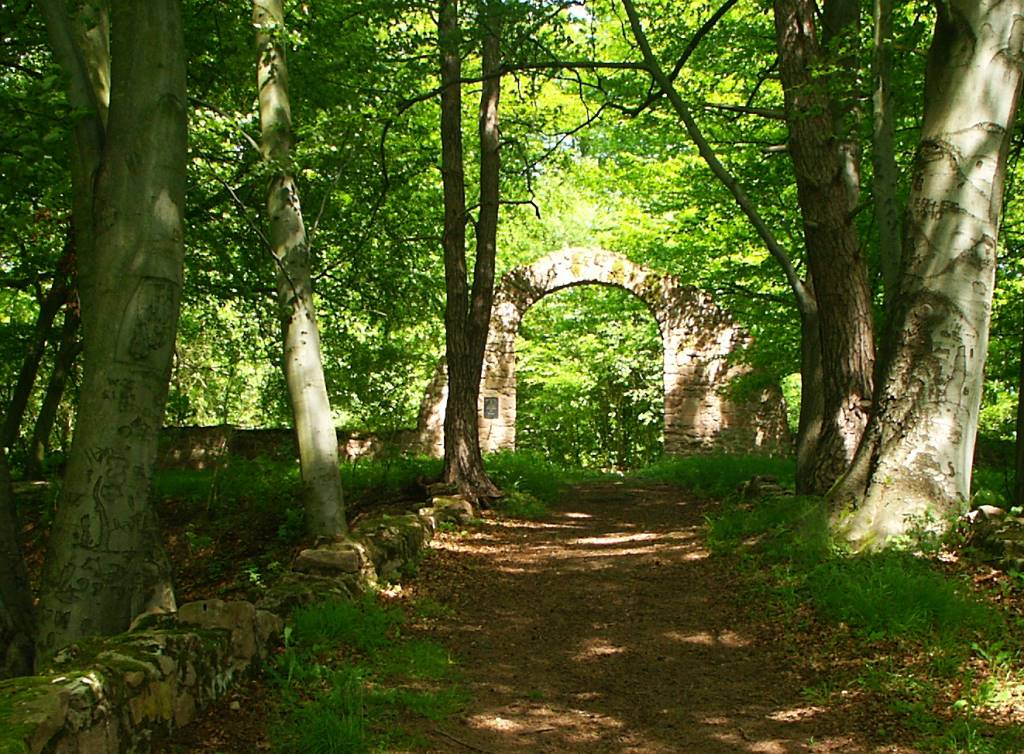
Blumenstein ruins

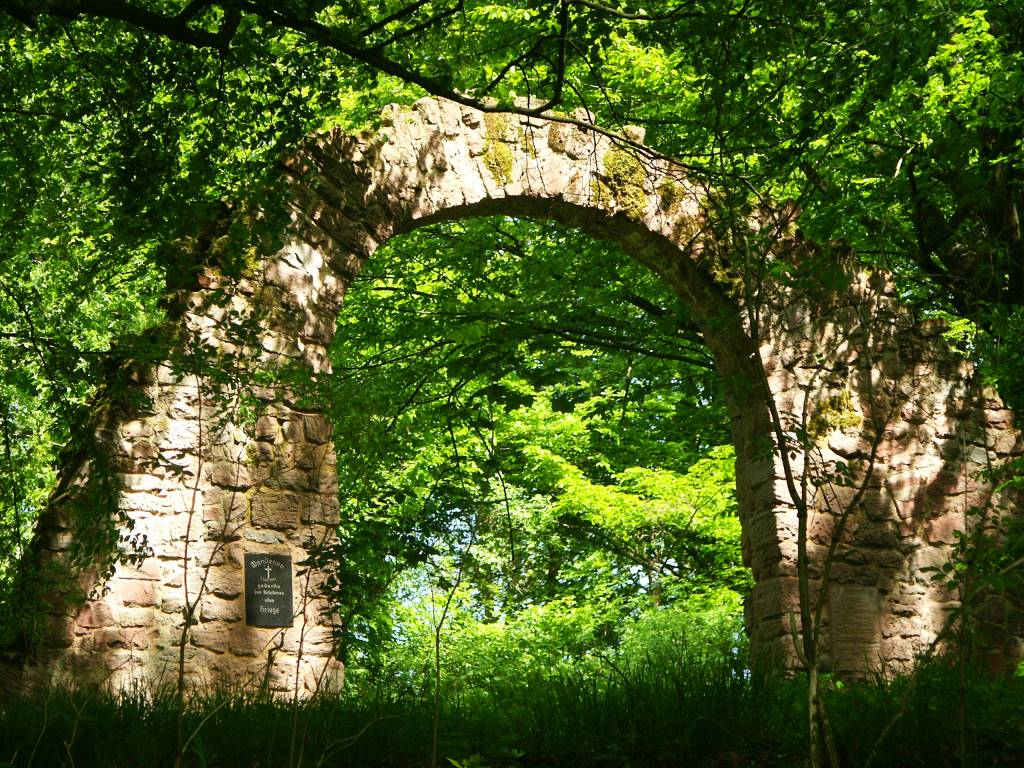
Gate

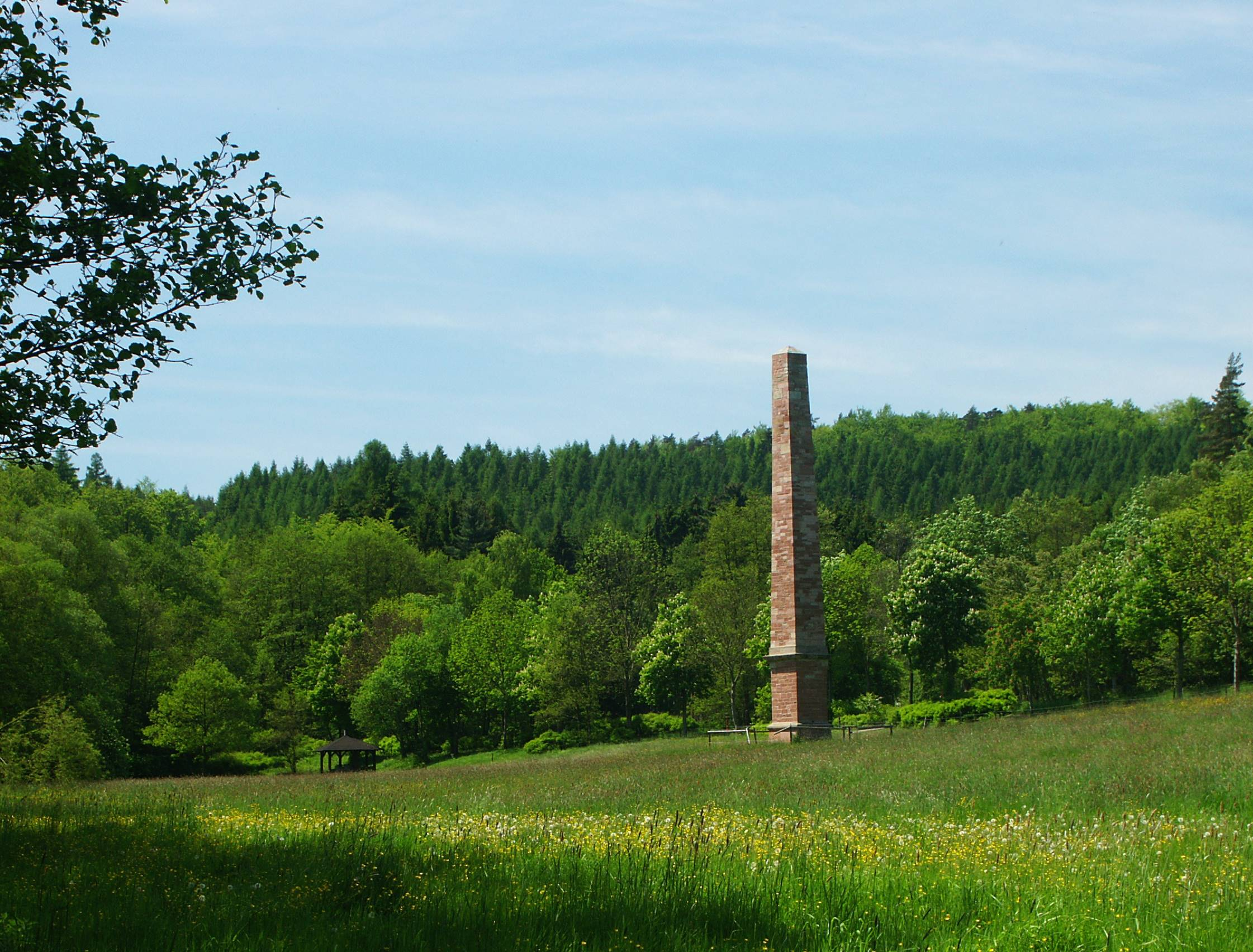
Obelisk

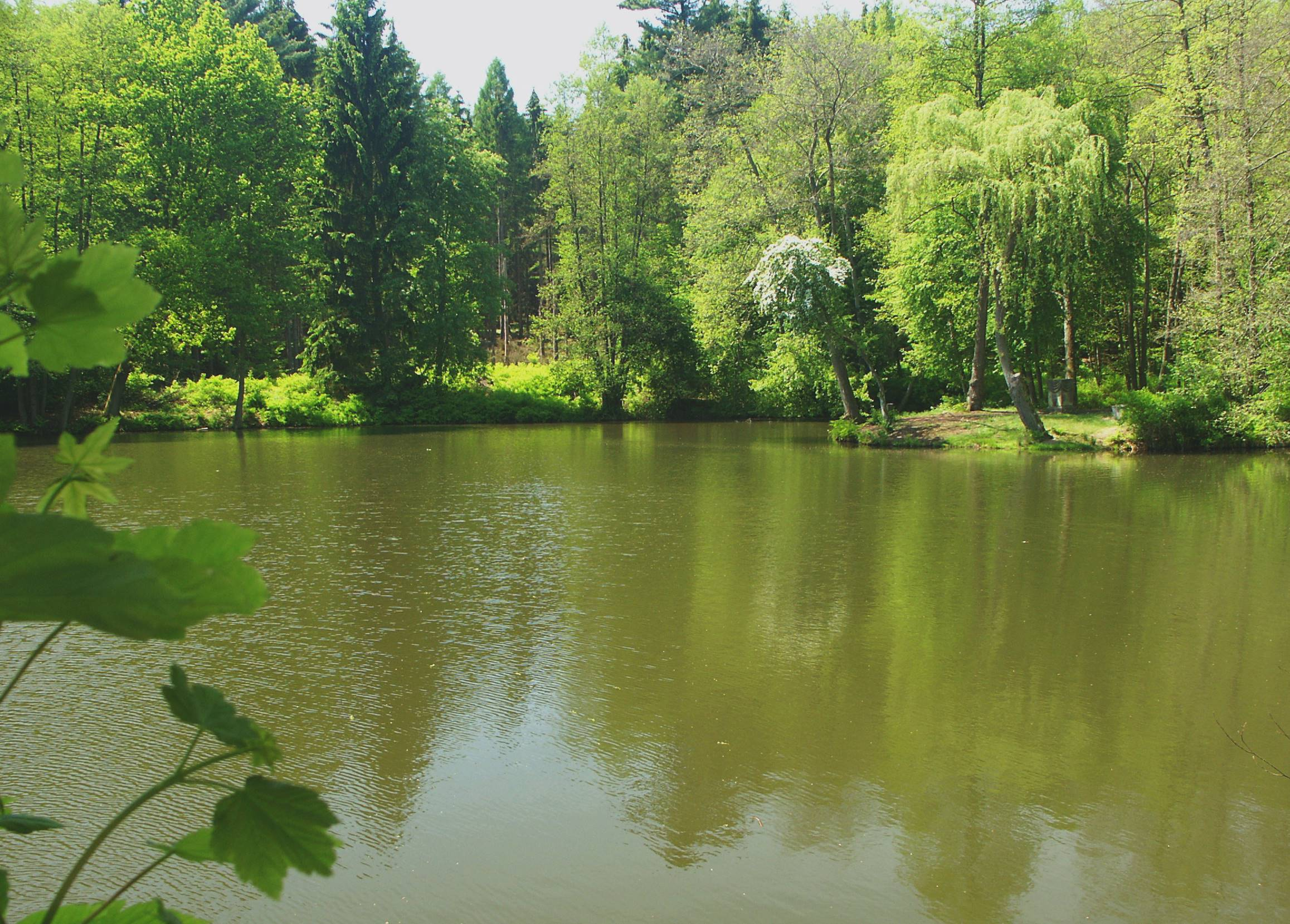
Pond

=== Nature ===
- Rhäden nature and bird conservation area with information centre in Obersuhl

There are also many hiking trails, especially by way of the Blumenstein ruins around the Wildeck valley, by which one crosses the Bellers Estate. Quite a few forests can be visited on these hikes, leading by the Franzoseneiche ("Frenchman's Oak").

== Famous people ==
=== Sons and daughters of the town ===
- Werner Heckmann, trumpet soloist at the Staatstheater Stuttgart and member of German Brass
- Margrit Klinger, German track and field athlete. Winner of bronze medal at the 1982 European Championships in Athletics in Athens

=== Nice to know ===
- Wildecker Herzbuben, German Volksmusik group (Wolfgang Schwalm and Wilfried Gliem)
