= Charles Emmanuel, Landgrave of Hesse-Rotenburg =

Noble of Hesse-Rotenburg, current-day Germany (1746–1812)

Charles Emmanuel
- Landgrave of Hesse-Rotenburg
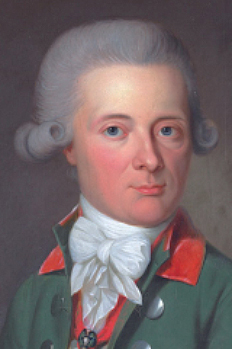
- Charles Emmanuel, Landgrave of Hesse-Rotenburg
- Born: 5 June 1746; Langenschwalbach
- Died: 23 March 1812 (aged 65); Frankfurt am Main
- Spouse: Princess Leopoldina of Liechtenstein
- Issue: Victor, Landgrave of Hesse-Rotenburg; Klotilde, Princess of Hohenlohe-Bartenstein
- House: House of Hesse-Kassel
- Father: Constantine of Hesse-Rotenburg
- Mother: Sophia of Starhemberg

Charles Emmanuel, Landgrave of Hesse-Rotenburg (Karl Emanuel; 5 June 1746 – 23 March 1812) was landgrave of Hessen-Rotenburg between 1778 and 1812. He was named after his uncle Charles Emmanuel III of Sardinia, husband of his aunt Polyxena of Hesse-Rotenburg.

== Early life ==
He was born in Langenschwalbach, the son of Constantine, Landgrave of Hesse-Rotenburg (24 May 1716 – 30 December 1778) and his first wife, Countess Maria Sophia Theresia Hedwigis Eva von Starhemberg (October 1722 – 12 December 1773), widow of William Hyacinth, Prince of Nassau-Siegen and sister of Georg Adam, Prince of Starhemberg.

== Marriage and issue ==
Karl Emanuel married Princess Leopoldina Maria Anna Francisca de Paula Adelgunda of Liechtenstein (Vienna, 30 January 1754 – Frankfurt, 16 October 1823), daughter of Franz Josef I, Prince of Liechtenstein, on 1 September 1771 in Felsberg. The couple had two children.

- Victor Amadeus (2 September 1779 – 12 November 1834); named after Victor Amadeus III of Sardinia
- Marie Adelheid Klotilde (12 September 1787 – 6 January 1869); named after Clothilde of France; married Prince Karl August of Hohenlohe-Bartenstein (1788–1844)

Karl also had an illegitimate son by Lucie Juliane Amalie Struve (b. 1769), daughter of Johann Conrad Struve (d. 1782), Quartermaster from Braunschweig:

- Ernst von Blumenstein (11 February 1796 – 25 August 1875); married Johanna Caroline Friederike von Meyerfeld (1799-1866) and had issue

Karl's only descendants were from his illegitimate line.

== Death ==
He died in Frankfurt in 1812.

== Ancestry ==
Ancestors of Charles Emmanuel, Landgrave of Hesse-Rotenburg

8. William, Landgrave of Hesse-Rotenburg
4. Ernest Leopold, Landgrave of Hesse-Rotenburg
9. Maria Anna of Löwenstein-Wertheim-Rochefort
2. Constantine, Landgrave of Hesse-Rotenburg
10. Maximilian Carl, Count of Löwenstein-Wertheim-Rochefort (=14)
5. Countess Eleonore of Löwenstein-Wertheim-Rochefort
11. Maria Polyxena Khuen of Lichtenberg (=15)
1. Charles Emmanuel of Hesse-Rotenburg
12. Count Franz Ottokar of Starhemberg
6. Count Conrad Sigismund of Starhemberg
13. Countess Cecile Clara of Rindsmaul
3. Countess Sophia of Starhemberg
14. Maximilian Carl, Count of Löwenstein-Wertheim-Rochefort (=10)
7. Countess Maria Leopoldine Theresia Renata Dorothea of Löwenstein-Wertheim-Rochefort
15. Maria Polyxena Khuen of Lichtenberg (=11)

Preceded by Constantine	Landgrave of Hesse-Rotenburg; 30 December 1778 – 23 March 1812	Succeeded by Victor Amadeus
