= Victor Amadeus, Landgrave of Hesse-Rotenburg =

Victor
- Landgrave of Hesse-Rotenburg
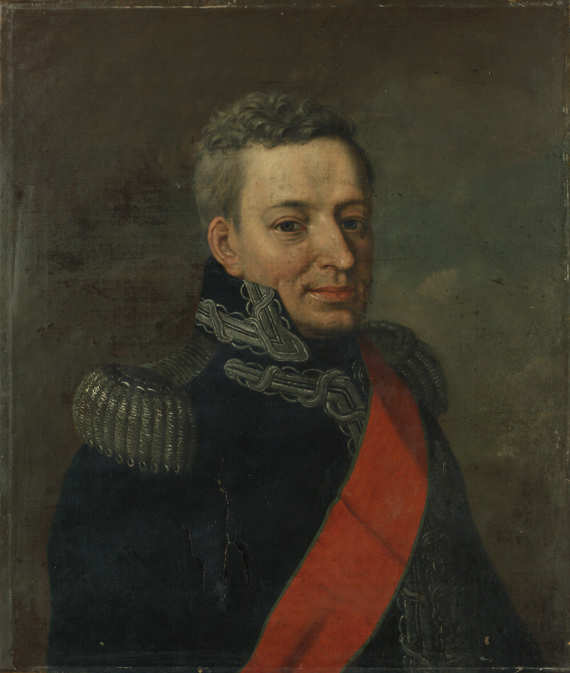
- Portrait, 1820s
- Born: 2 September 1780; Rotenburg
- Died: 12 November 1834 (aged 55); Racibórz
- Spouse: Princess Leopoldine of Fürstenberg; Princess Elisabeth of Hohenlohe-Langenburg; Altgräfin Eleonora of Salm-Reifferscheid-Krautheim and Gerlachsheim
- House: House of Hesse-Kassel
- Father: Charles Emmanuel of Hesse-Rotenburg
- Mother: Leopoldina of Liechtenstein

Victor of Hesse-Rotenburg (Victor Amadeus; 2 September 1779 – 12 November 1834) was the last Landgrave of Hesse-Rotenburg and the Prince of Corvey from 1815 and Duke of Ratibor from 1821. His namesake was his second cousin King Victor Amadeus III of Sardinia.

== Early life ==
Amadeus was the son of Charles Emmanuel of Hesse-Rotenburg (1746–1812) and Princess Leopoldina of Liechtenstein (1754–1823), daughter of Prince Franz Josef I.

During the reign of Karl Emanuel, Napoleon occupied Kurhessen, establishing the new Kingdom of Westphalia for his youngest brother Jérôme Bonaparte in 1806. However, the partial sovereignty of the Landgrave Hesse-Rotenburg was still recognized.

== Career ==
King Jérôme of Westphalia appointed Amadeus as his chamberlain, but Amadeus rejected the appointment stating that he was a subject of The Holy Roman Empire, although the areas of Hesse-Rotenburg, St. Goar and Rheinfels were under Napoléon's control. Jérôme accused him of betrayal, and Amadeus fled to St. Goar. The Emperor finally declared the Prince to be a Westphalian subject.

After the death of his father, Victor Amadeus was compelled to transfer the Palais Hesse-Rotenburg to the King in Kassel, in order to pay a sum of thirty-five thousand thalers, which had been owed to the expelled Elector of Hesse-Kassel and was now claimed by Jérôme. With the hand over of the palace, Jérôme confirmed him as Prince on July 10, 1813; Amadeus continued to refuse to enter his service.

After the restitution of Kurhessen in 1813, Amadeus resumed his rights as Landgrave of Hesse-Rotenburg. In 1820, as a late consequence of the Congress of Vienna he had received the principalities Ratibor and Corvey under allodial title in compensation for areas lost to France in 1807 and to Prussia (St. Goar and Rheinfels Castle) in 1815.

He rejected any involvement in the new constitution on administrative reform in Hesse in 1821, as he regarded the provisions as not binding on himself and his possessions. Repeated negotiations with Amadeus attempted to persuade him to transfer his rights and property in Hesse for an indemnity amounting to 450,000 talers.

During the years 1825 to 1833 he moved the Rotenburg court library of 36,000 volumes to Imperial Abbey of Corvey in Höxter, where it remains as the Fürstliche Bibliothek Corvey (Corvey Princely Library).

== Personal life ==
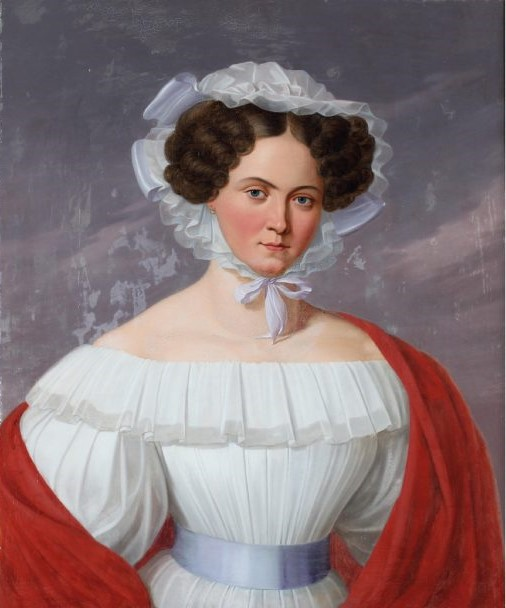
Landgräfin Elisabeth von Hesse-Rotenburg

In Prague on 20 October 1799, Amadeus married Princess Leopoldine of Fürstenberg (b. 10 April 1781 – d. Prague, 7 June 1806). This marriage was childless.

In Langenburg on 10 September 1812, he married a relative, Princess Elisabeth of Hohenlohe-Langenburg (b. Langenburg, 22 November 1790 – d. Holitsch, 6 October 1830), daughter of Charles Louis, Prince of Hohenlohe-Langenburg. They had one stillborn daughter (Rotenburg, 1 September 1813).

In Gerlachsheim on 19 November 1831 Amadeus married Countess Eleonora of Salm-Reifferscheid-Krautheim and Gerlachsheim (b. Heubach, 13 July 1799 – d. Raitz, 10 November 1851). This marriage was childless.

With no surviving issue, he bequeathed the titles and possessions of Ratibor and Corvey to his nephew Victor, Prince of Hohenlohe-Schillingsfürst. This area was 34,000 ha in size and consisted mostly of forests, including the Corvey abbey and Rauden palace-monastery.

== Library ==
The "Corvey princely library" (Fürstliche Bibliothek Corvey), near Höxter in Germany, which contains about 74,000 volumes in German, French, and English, and mainly from the period 1798–1834, has survived in Amadeus' Imperial Abbey of Corvey:

This library houses one of the largest collections of Romantic-era literature in the world. Thanks to the eccentric buying policy of the original owner, it also contains the best collection of popular fiction in English between 1798 and 1834 to be found anywhere. There are many rare works; several are unique. Novels which were generally treated as ephemera were here preserved virtually untouched for two centuries. It was only in the 1980s that the scholarly importance of Corvey was recognised.

== Titles ==
- 2 September 1779 – 23 March 1812 - His Serene Highness the Hereditary Prince of Hesse-Rotenburg
- 23 March 1812 – 12 November 1834 - His Serene Highness the Landgrave of Hesse-Rotenburg
