= Hesse-Kassel =

Hesse-Kassel may refer to:

- German states with Kassel as the capital:
  - Landgraviate of Hesse-Kassel (1567–1803)
  - Electorate of Hesse (1803–1807, 1814–1866)
- Kassel (region)
- Province of Kurhessen

== See also ==
- Hesse Kassel, a Chilean rock band
- KSV Hessen Kassel, a German football club
- Hessen Cassel, Indiana, a community in the United States
