= Starhemberg =

Austrian noble family

County (Principality) of Starhemberg Grafschaft (Fürstentum) Starhemberg
- 1643–1806
- Status: State of the Holy Roman Empire
- Capital: Starhemberg
- Government: Principality
- Historical era: Early modern period
  - Castle built by Ottokar of Styria: 1140–45
  - County gained Reichsfreiheit: 1643
  - Raised to principality: 1765
  - Mediatised to the Austrian Empire: 1806
Succeeded by
Austrian Empire

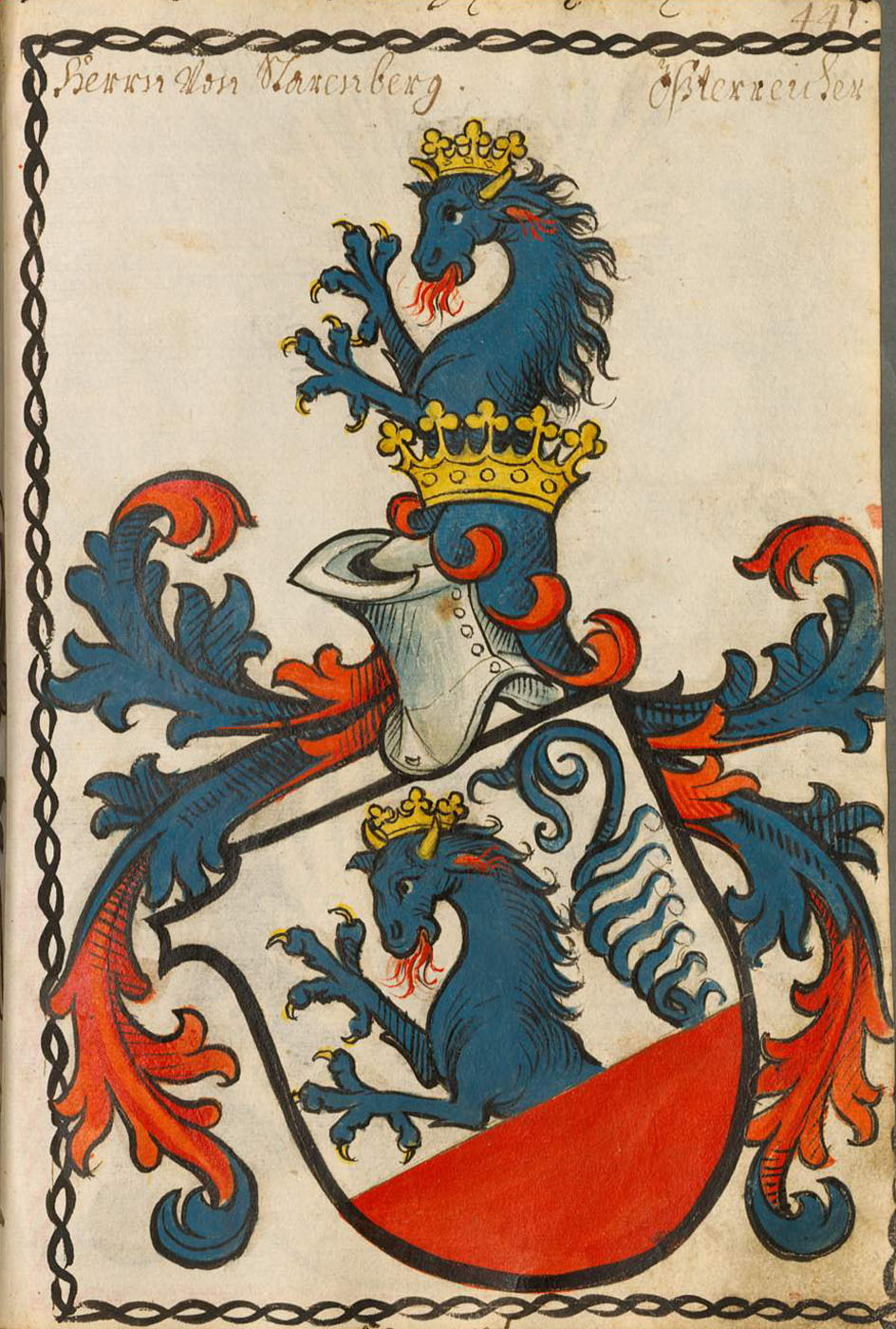
Original arms of the family

The House of Starhemberg (German pronunciation: [ˈʃtaːʁəmbɛʁk]) is an old and distinguished Austrian noble family of princely rank and historically sovereign status. The family originated in Upper Austria, specifically in the region of Steyr and Steinbach. Members of the family played an important political role within the Holy Roman Empire and later in the Austro-Hungarian Empire. As one of a small number of mediatized houses (former reigning families), the House of Starhemberg belongs to the High nobility (ancient nobility).

== History ==
The Starhembergs are one of the 12 so-called "Apostle Houses", i.e. the oldest and most prominent noble families in Austria, already established during the early Babenberg rule of Austria (976 to 1246). These families were considered part of the ancient landed nobility and played a central role in regional politics and society. In addition to them, other prominent noble houses included the House of Liechtenstein, Fürstenberg, Abensperg und Traun, Stubenberg, Zinzendorf und Pottendorf, Salm, and Collalto, among others.

The first known member Gundaker I von Steyr was mentioned in the 12th century, as a ministerial of the Otakar dynasty that ruled over the Duchy of Styria. In 1150, he married Richezza von Steinbach (Richezza nobilis matrona de Steinpach), and through her he inherited Steinbach in 1160.

They were made imperial counts (Reichsgrafen) in 1643 by Emperor Ferdinand III, and were later raised to princely rank (Reichsfürsten) in 1765 by Joseph II, Holy Roman Emperor.

In 1806, the Princes of Starhemberg lost their sovereign independence through the mediatisation initiated by Napoleon, but were allowed to retain equality of birth with other reigning families, important for marriage purposes. The family belongs to the small circle of high nobility, and their Starhemberg Palace (German: Schloss Starhemberg) in Eferding, Upper Austria, includes a museum about the family's history.

== Mediatized Princes of Starhemberg ==
- Camillo, 4th Prince (1804–1872)
  - Camillo, 5th Prince 1872–1900 (1835–1900)
    - Ernst Rüdiger, 6th Prince 1900–1927 (1861–1927)
      - Ernst Rüdiger, 7th Prince 1927–1956 (1899–1956)
        - Heinrich, 8th Prince 1956–1997 (1934–1997)
      - Prince Georg (1904–1978)
        - Prince Franz (1933–1995)
          - Georg Adam, 9th Prince 1997–present (b.1961)
            - Constantin, Hereditary Prince of Starhemberg (b.1992)
            - Prince Ernst (b.1995)
          - Prince Franz (b.1963)
            - Prince Nicolaus (b.2001)

== Notable family members ==
- Eberhard IV of Starhemberg (ca 1370–1429), Archbishop of Salzburg from 1427 until his death
- Erasmus of Starhemberg (1503–1560), Austrian noble
- Bohunka von Starhemberg (died 1530), wife of the Bohemian noble Jost III of Rosenberg, who died at the birth of their daughter
- Count Ernst Rüdiger von Starhemberg (1638–1701), Austrian politician, field marshal, the defender of Vienna against the Turks in 1683, commander of the Vienna city defence
- Maximilian Lorenz von Starhemberg (ca 1640–1689), Imperial field marshal and commander of the fortress of Philippsburg, brother of Ernst Rüdiger
- Gundaker Thomas von Starhemberg (1663–1745), half-brother of Ernst Rüdiger, politician and financial expert
- Guido von Starhemberg (1657–1737), Austrian commander during the War of the Spanish Succession
- Maximilian Adam Graf von Starhemberg (1669–1741), brother of Guido and also Austrian field Marshal.
- Maria Eva Sophia of Starhemberg (1722–73), married William Hyacinth, Prince of Nassau-Siegen and Constantine, Landgrave of Hesse-Rotenburg
- Georg Adam, Prince of Starhemberg (1724–1807), Austrian Ambassador in France
- Ludwig, Prince of Starhemberg (1762–1833), Austrian Ambassador in the United Kingdom
- Ernst Rüdiger Prince von Starhemberg (1861–1927), Austrian politician and landowner
- Franziska Princess von Starhemberg (1875–1943), Austrian politician for the Christian Social Party
- Ernst Rüdiger Prince von Starhemberg (1899–1956), Austrian politician, Vice-Chancellor of Austria and Heimwehr
- Nora Gregor, second wife of Ernst Rüdiger, actress and writer using the pseudonym Henry Gregor
- Heinrich Starhemberg (1934–97), son of Ernst Rüdiger and Nora Gregor
