= Landgraviate of Hesse-Rotenburg =

Former German landgraviate

Landgraviate of Hesse-Rotenburg Landgrafschaft Hessen-Rotenburg (German)
- 1627–1834
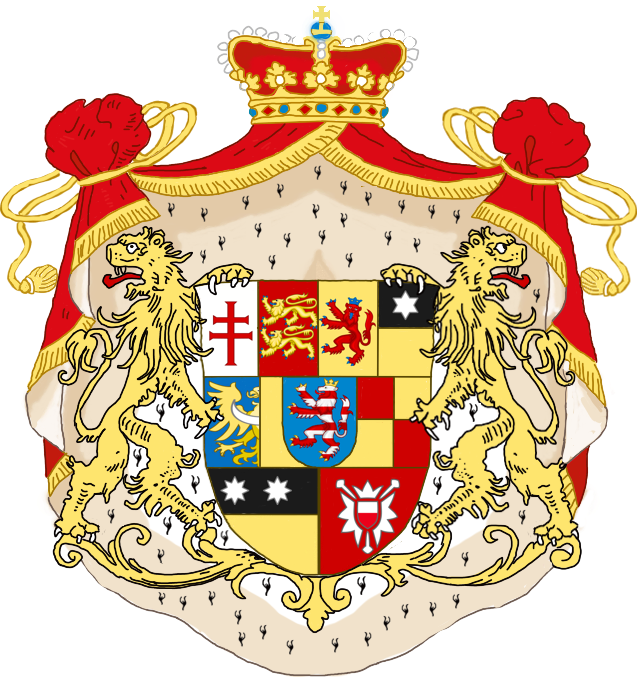
- Coat of arms

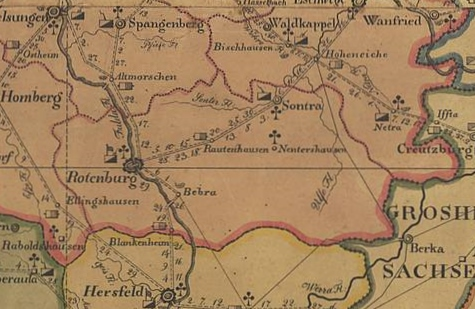
- Status: State of the Holy Roman Empire (1627-1806) state of Confederation of the Rhine (1806-1807); State of the German Confederation (1815–1834)
- Capital: Rotenburg an der Fulda
- Religion: Catholicism; Lutheranism; Calvinism
- Government: Landgraviate
- Landgrave of Hesse-Rotenburg
  - 1627–1658: Herman IV (first)
  - 1812–1834: Victor Amadeus (last)
- Historical era: Early Modern Period
  - Established: 1627
  - Disestablished: November 12, 1834
| Preceded by | Succeeded by |
| Hesse-Kassel | Electorate of Hesse |
- Today part of: Hesse

Hesse-Rotenburg (sometimes referred to as Hesse-Rheinfels) is a former German landgraviate created from the landgraviate of Hesse-Cassel in 1627. Its independence ended in 1834 when the estates not bequeathed to princes Victor and Chlodwig of Hohenlohe-Waldenburg-Schillingsfürst were reunited with Hesse-Kassel.

== History ==
The line of Hesse-Kassel (or Hesse-Cassel) was founded by William IV, surnamed the Wise, eldest son of Philip the Magnanimous. On his father's death in 1567, he received one half of Hesse, with Cassel as his capital; this formed the Landgraviate of Hesse-Kassel. Additions were made to it by inheritance from his brother's possessions. His son, Maurice the Learned (1572–1632) was Landgrave of Hesse-Kassel from 1592 until 1627. Maurice converted to Calvinism in 1605, became involved later in the Thirty Years' War, and, after being forced to cede some of his territories to the Darmstadt line, abdicated in 1627 in favour of his son William V (1602–1637). His younger sons received apanages, which created several cadet lines of the house (Hesse-Rotenburg, Hesse-Eschwege and Hesse-Rheinfels), of which, with amalgamation, that of Hesse-Rheinfels-Rotenburg survived till 1834.

In 1627, Ernest (1623–1693), a younger son of Maurice, received Rheinfels and lower Katzenelnbogen as his inheritance. Some years later, on the deaths of two of his brothers, Frederick, Landgrave of Hesse-Eschwege (1617–1655) and Herman IV, Landgrave of Hesse-Rotenburg (1607–1658), he added Eschwege, Rotenburg, Wanfried and other districts to his possessions. Ernest, who was a convert to the Roman Catholic Church, was a great traveller and a voluminous writer. About 1700 his two sons, William (d. 1725) and Charles (or Karl) (d. 1711), divided their territories, and founded the families of Hesse-Rotenburg and Hesse-Wanfried. The latter family died out in 1755, when William's grandson, Constantine (d. 1778), reunited the lands except Rheinfels, which had been acquired by Hesse-Kassel in 1735, and ruled them as Landgrave of Hesse-Rotenburg.

At the peace of Lunéville in 1801, the part of the landgraviate on the left bank of the Rhine was surrendered to France and, in 1815, other parts were ceded to Prussia, the landgrave Victor Amadeus being compensated by the abbey of Corvey and the Silesian Duchy of Ratibor. Victor was the last male member of his family, so, with the consent of Prussia, he bequeathed his allodial estates to his nephews the princes Victor and Chlodwig of Hohenlohe-Waldenburg-Schillingsfürst. When the landgrave died on 12 November 1834 the remaining parts of Hesse-Rotenburg were united with Hesse-Kassel according to the arrangement of 1627. Hesse-Rotenburg was never completely independent of Hesse-Kassel. The most important member of the family was probably Polyxena, Queen consort of Sardinia as wife of Charles Emmanuel III of Sardinia. Perhaps the most famous member of this family was Charles Constantine (1752–1821), a younger son of Landgrave Constantine, who took part in the French Revolution under the name Citoyen Hesse.
