= List of French peers =

== The Twelve Peers ==
They were probably, at the time of the old Frankish monarchy, the great princes and vassals who were called to appoint the successor of the king among the eligible princes to the crown. At the Capetian era, we find that the number is set at twelve, but all throughout the Old Regime, there were 173 fiefs which were erected in peerage.

=== Six ecclesiastical peers ===
Archbishop of Reims	Bishop of Laon	Bishop of Langres	Bishop of Beauvais	Bishop of Châlons	Bishop of Noyon

==== The archbishop-duke of Reims ====
- 47 holders:
1. 1200-1202 Guillaume de Champagne (1135–1202)
2. 1204-1206 Guy Paré (+1206)
3. 1207-1218 Albéric de Humbert de Hautvilliers (+1218)
4. 1219-1226 Guillaume de Joinville (+1226) (previously Langres)
5. 1227-1240 Henri de Dreux (1193–1240) (previously Châlons)
6. 1244-1249 Yves de Saint-Martin (+1249)
7. 1249-1250 Juhel de Mathefelon (+1250)
8. 1251-1263 Thomas de Beaumets (+1263)
9. 1266-1270 Jean de Courtenay-Champignelles (1226–1270)
10. 1274-1298 Pierre Barbet (+1298)
11. 1299-1324 Robert de Courtenay-Champignelles (1251–1324)
12. 1324-1334 Guillaume de Trie (+1334)
13. 1334-1351 Jean de Vienne (+1351)
14. 1351-1352 Hugues d'Arcy (+1352) (previously Laon)
15. 1352-1355 Humbert II de La Tour du Pin (1312–1355)
16. 1355-1373 Jean de Craon (+1373)
17. 1373-1375 Louis Thésart (+1375)
18. 1376-1389 Richard Picques de Besançon (+1389)
19. 1389-1390 Ferry Cassinel (+1390)
20. 1390-1409 Guy de Roye (+1409)
21. 1409-1413 Simon de Cramaud (+1429)
22. 1413 Pierre Trousseau (+1413)
23. 1414-1444 Renaud de Chartres (+1444) (previously Beauvais)
24. 1449-1473 Jean Jouvenel des Ursins (1388–1473) (previously Laon)
25. 1445-1449 Jacques Jouvenel des Ursins (1410–1457)
26. 1473-1493 Pierre de Laval de Montfort (+1493)
27. 1493-1497 Robert Briçonnet (+1497)
28. 1497-1507 Guillaume Briçonnet (1445–1514)
29. 1507-1508 Charles-Dominique de Caretto (1454–1514)
30. 1508-1532 Robert de Lénoncourt (+1532)
31. 1533-1538 Jean de Lorraine (1498–1550)
32. 1538-1574 Charles de Lorraine-Guise (1524–1574)
33. 1591 Philippe de Lénoncourt (1527–1591) (previously Châlons)
34. 1574-1588 Louis de Lorraine-Guise (1555–1588)
35. 1592-1594 Nicolas de Pellevé (1518–1594)
36. 1594-1605 Philippe du Bec (1520–1605)
37. 1605-1621 Louis de Lorraine-Guise (1575–1621)
38. 1622-1629 Gabriel de Gifford de Sainte-Marie (1554–1629)
39. 1629-1641 Henri de Lorraine-Guise (1614–1664)
40. 1641-1651 Léonore d'Étampes de Valençay (1589–1651)
41. 1651-1657 Henri de Savoie-Nemours (1625–1659)
42. 1657-1671 Antoine Barberini (1607–1671)
43. 1671-1710 Charles-Maurice Le Tellier de Louvois (1642–1710)
44. 1710-1721 François de Mailly-Nesle (1658–1721)
45. 1721-1762 Armand-Jules de Rohan-Guémenée (1695–1762)
46. 1762-1777 Charles-Antoine de La Roche-Aymon (1697–1777)
47. 1777-1790 Alexandre-Angélique de Talleyrand-Périgord (1736–1821)

==== The bishop-duke of Laon ====
- 41 holders
1. 1200-1207 Roger de Rozoy (+1207)
2. 1207-1210 Renaud Surdelle (+1210)
3. 1210-1215 Robert de Châtillon (+1215)
4. 1215-1238 Anselme de Mauny de Bercenay (+1238)
5. 1238-1249 Garnier (+1249)
6. 1249-1261 Ithier de Mauny (+1261)
7. 1262-1269 Guillaume des Moustiers (+1269)
8. 1270-1279 Geoffroy de Beaumont (+1279)
9. 1280-1285 Guillaume de Châtillon-Jaligny (+1285)
10. 1285-1297 Robert de Torote (+1297)
11. 1297-1307 Gazon de Savigny (+1307)
12. 1317-1325 Raoul Rouxelet (+1325)
13. 1326-1336 Albert de Roye (+1336)
14. 1336-1339 Roger d'Armagnac (+1339)
15. 1339-1351 Hugues d'Arcy (+1352)
16. 1351-1358 Robert le Coq (+1368)
17. 1363-1370 Geoffroy Le Meingre (+1370)
18. 1370-1386 Pierre Aycelin de Montaigu (+1388)
19. 1386-1418 Jean de Roucy (+1418)
20. 1419-1444 Guillaume de Champeaux (+1444)
21. 1444-1449 Jean Jouvenel des Ursins (1388–1473) (previously Beauvais)
22. 1449-1460 Antoine du Bec-Crespin (+1472)
23. 1460-1468 Jean de Gaucourt (+1468)
24. 1468-1472 Renaud de Bourbon (+1483)
25. 1473-1509 Charles de Luxembourg-Ligny (1447–1509)
26. 1510-1552 Louis de Bourbon-Vendôme (1493–1556)
27. 1552-1560 Jean Doc (+1560)
28. 1564-1580 Jean de Bours (+1580)
29. 1581-1598 Valentin Douglas (+1598)
30. 1599 François de Luxembourg (+1613) (also duke-peer of Piney-Luxembourg)
31. 1601-1612 Godefroy de Billy (1536–1612)
32. 1612-1619 Benjamin de Brichanteau de Nangis (1585–1619)
33. 1620-1652 Philibert de Brichanteau de Nangis (1588–1652)
34. 1653-1681 César d'Estrées (1628–1714)
35. 1681-1694 Jean d'Estrées (1651–1694)
36. 1662-1721 Louis-Annet de Clermont-Chaste de Roussillon (1662–1721)
37. 1721-1723 Charles de Saint-Albin (1698–1764)
38. 1723 Henri François Xavier de Belsunce de Castelmoron (1670–1755)
39. 1724-1741 Etienne-Joseph de La Fare (1690–1741)
40. 1741-1777 Jean-François de Rochechouart de Clermont de Faudoas (1708–1777)
41. 1777-1790 Louis-Maxime de Sabran (1739–1811)

==== The bishop-duke of Langres ====
- 40 holders
1. 1200-1205 Hilduin de Vandoeuvre (+1205)
2. 1205-1210 Robert de Châtillon (+1226)
3. 1210-1219 Guillaume de Joinville (+1226)
4. 1220-1231 Hugues de Montréal (+1231)
5. 1232-1240 Robert de Torote (+1246)
6. 1240-1250 Hugues de Rochecorbon (+1250)
7. 1250-1266 Guy de Rochefort (+1266)
8. 1266-1293 Guy de Genève (+1293)
9. 1294-1305 Jean de Rochefort (+1305)
10. 1305-1306 Bertrand de Goth (+1313)
11. 1306-1318 Guillaume de Durfort de Duras (+1330)
12. 1318-1324 Louis de Poitiers (+1327)
13. 1324-1329 Pierre de Rochefort (+1329)
14. 1329-1335 Jean de Chalon (1300–1335)
15. 1335-1338 Guy Baudet (+1338)
16. 1338-1342 Guy Des Prez (+1349)
17. 1342-1344 Jean d'Arcy (+1344)
18. 1344-1345 Hugues de Pomard (+1345)
19. 1345-1374 Guillaume de Poitiers (+1374)
20. 1374-1395 Bernard de La Tour d'Auvergne (+1395)
21. 1413-1433 Charles de Poitiers (+1433) (previously Châlons)
22. 1397-1413 Louis de Bar de Mousson (+1430)
23. 1433-1435 Jean Gobillon (+1435)
24. 1436-1452 Philippe de Vienne (+1452)
25. 1452-1453 Jean d'Aussy (+1453)
26. 1453-1481 Guy Bernard (+1481)
27. 1481-1497 Jean d'Amboise (+1497)
28. 1497-1512 Jean d'Amboise (+1512)
29. 1512-1529 Michel Boudet (+1529)
30. 1529-1561 Claude de Longwy de Givry (1484–1561)
31. 1562-1565 Jean Helvis de La Roche (+1565)
32. 1565-1569 Pierre de Gondi de Retz (1533–1616)
33. 1570-1614 Charles de Pérusse d'Escars (1522–1614)
34. 1615-1655 Sébastien Zamet (1587–1655)
35. 1655-1670 Louis Barbier de La Rivière (1593–1670)
36. 1671-1695 Louis-Armand de Simiane de Gordes (1627–1695)
37. 1695-1724 François de Clermont-Tonnerre (1658–1724)
38. 1724-1733 Pierre de Pardaillan de Gondrin d'Antin (1692–1733)
39. 1734-1770 Gilles-Gaspard de Montmorin de Saint-Hérem (1691–1770)
40. 1770-1790 César Guillaume de La Luzerne (1738–1821)

==== The bishop-count of Beauvais ====
- 39 holders
1. 1200-1217 Philippe de Dreux (v.1158-1217)
2. 1217-1234 Milon de Châtillon-Nanteuil (+1234)
3. 1234-1236 Geoffroy de Clermont de Nelle (+1236)
4. 1237-1248 Robert de Cressonsart (+1248)
5. 1249-1267 Guillaume de Gretz (+1267)
6. 1267-1283 Renaud de Nanteuil (de Nantolio) (+1283)
7. 1283-1300 Thiébaud de Nanteuil (de Nantolio) (+1300)
8. 1301-1312 Simon de Clermont de Nelle (+1312) (previously Noyon)
9. 1312-1347 Jean de Marigny (+1351)
10. 1347-1356 Guillaume Bertrand de Briquebecq (+1356) (previously Noyon)
11. 1356-1360 Philippe d'Alençon (1338–1397)
12. 1360-1368 Jean de Dormans (+1373)
13. 1368-1375 Jean d'Augerant (+1375)
14. 1375-1387 Miles de Dormans (+1387)
15. 1387-1388 Guillaume de Vienne (+1407)
16. 1388-1395 Thomas d'Estouteville (+1395)
17. 1395-1397 Louis d'Orléans (+1397)
18. 1398-1412 Pierre de Savoisy (+1412)
19. 1413 Renaud de Chartres (+1444) Châtillon
20. 1413-1419 Bernard de Chevenon (+1419)
21. 1420-1430 Pierre Cauchon (+1442)
22. 1432-1444 Jean Juvénal des Ursins (1388–1473)
23. 1444-1462 Guillaume de Helande (+1462)
24. 1462-1487 Jean de Bar (+1487)
25. 1487-1503 Antoine Dubois (+1537)
26. 1488-1521 Louis de Villiers de L'Isle-Adam (+1521)
27. 1523-1530 Antoine de Lascaris de Tende (+1546)
28. 1530-1535 Charles de Villiers de l'Isle-Adam (+1535)
29. 1535-1569 Odet de Coligny de Châtillon (1515–1571)
30. 1569-1575 Charles de Bourbon (1523–1590) (also duke-peer of Graville)
31. 1575-1593 Nicolas Fumée (+1593)
32. 1595-1616 René Potier de Blancmesnil (1574–1616)
33. 1617-1650 Augustin Potier de Blancmesnil (+1650)
34. 1650-1679 Nicolas Choart de Buzenval (1611–1679)
35. 1679-1713 Toussaint de Forbin-Janson (1629–1713)
36. 1713-1728 François-Honorat de Beauvillier de Saint-Aignan (1682–1751)
37. 1728-1772 Étienne-René Potier de Gesvres (1697–1774)
38. 1772-1790 François-Joseph de La Rochefoucauld-Bayers (1727–1792)

==== The bishop-count of Châlons ====
- 40 holders:
1. 1200-1201 Rotrou de Perche (+1201)
2. 1201-1215 Gérard de Douay (+1215)
3. 1215-1226 Guillaume II de Perche (+1226)
4. 1226-1227 Henri de Dreux (1193–1240)
5. 1228-1237 Philippe de Merville de Nemours (+1237)
6. 1238-1247 Geoffroy de Grandpré (+1247)
7. 1248-1261 Pierre de Hans (+1261)
8. 1263-1271 Conon de Vitry (+1271)
9. 1271-1273 Arnoul de Los de Chiny (+1273)
10. 1274-1277 Boson (+1278)
11. 1277-1284 Rémi de Saint-Jean de Sommetourbe (+1284)
12. 1284-1313 Jean de Châteauvillain (+1313)
13. 1313-1328 Pierre de Latilly (+1328)
14. 1328-1335 Simon de Châteauvillain (+1335)
15. 1335-1338 Philippe de Melun (+1345)
16. 1339 Jean de Mandevillain (+1339)
17. 1340-1351 Jean Happe (+1351)
18. 1352-1356 Regnaud de Chauveau (+1356)
19. 1357-1389 Archambaud de Lautrec (+1389)
20. 1390-1413 Charles de Poitiers (+1433)
21. 1413-1420 Louis de Bar de Mousson (+1430) (previously Langres)
22. 1420-1438 Jean de Sarrebrück (+1438)
23. 1439 Jean Tudert (+1439)
24. 1439-1453 Guillaume Le Tur (+1453)
25. 1453-1503 Geoffroy Floreau de Saint-Géran (+1503)
26. 1503-1535 Gilles de Luxembourg (+1535)
27. 1535-1550 Robert de Lenoncourt (v.1510-1561)
28. 1550-1556 Philippe de Lénoncourt (1527–1591)
29. 1552-1560 Jérôme Burgensis (+1573)
30. 1571-1573 Nicolas Clausse de Marchaumont (1545–1573)
31. 1574-1624 Cosme Clausse de Marchaumont (1548–1624)
32. 1624-1640 Henri Clausse de Fleury (+1640)
33. 1640-1680 Félix Vialart de Herse (1613–1680)
34. 1680-1695 Louis Antoine de Noailles (1651–1729)
35. 1695-1720 Jean-Gaston de Noailles (1669–1720)
36. 1720-1733 Nicolas-Charles de Saulx-Tavannes (1690–1759)
37. 1733-1763 Claude-Antoine de Choiseul-Beaupré (1697–1763)
38. 1763 Antoine de Lastic-Sieujac (1709–1763)
39. 1764-1781 Antoine-Léon Le Clerc de Juigné (1728–1811)
40. 1781-1790 Jules-Antoine de Clermont-Tonnerre (1748–1830)

==== The bishop-count of Noyon ====
- 40 holders:
1. 1200-1221 Etienne de Villebéon de Nemours (+1221)
2. 1222-1228 Gérard de Châtillon-Bazoches (+1228)
3. 1228-1240 Nicolas de Roye (+1240)
4. 1240-1249 Pierre Charlot de France (+1249)
5. 1250-1272 Vermond de La Boissière (+1272)
6. 1272-1297 Guy Des Près (+1297)
7. 1297-1301 Simon de Clermont de Nelle (+1312)
8. 1302-1303 Pierre de Ferrières (+1307)
9. 1304-1315 André Le Moine de Crécy (+1315)
10. 1315-1317 Florent de La Boissière (+1330)
11. 1317-1330 Foucaud de Rochechouart (+1343)
12. 1331-1337 Guillaume Bertrand de Briquebecq (+1356)
13. 1337-1339 Etienne Aubert (+1362)
14. 1339-1342 Pierre André (+1368)
15. 1342-1347 Bernard Le Brun (+1349)
16. 1347-1349 Guy de Comborn (+1349)
17. 1349 Firmin Cocquerel (+1349)
18. 1349-1351 Philippe d'Arbois (v.1301-1378)
19. 1351-1352 Jean de Meullent (+1363)
20. 1352-1388 Gilles de Lorris (+1388)
21. 1388-1409 Philippe de Moulin-Engilbert (+1409)
22. 1409-1415 Pierre de Fresnel (+1418)
23. 1415-1425 Raoul de Coucy (+1425)
24. 1426-1473 Jean de Mailly (+1473)
25. 1473-1501 Guillaume de Maraffin (+1501)
26. 1501-1525 Charles de Hangest (+1528)
27. 1525-1577 Jean de Hangest (+1577)
28. 1578-1587 Claude d'Angennes de Rambouillet (1538–1601)
29. 1588-1590 Gabriel de Blaigny (+1593)
30. 1590-1594 Jean Meunier (+1594)
31. 1594-1595 François Annibal d'Estrées (1573–1670)
32. 1596-1625 Charles de Balzac (+1625)
33. 1626-1660 Henri de Baradat (1598–1660)
34. 1660-1701 François de Clermont-Tonnerre (1629–1701)
35. 1701-1707 Claude-Maur d'Aubigné (1658–1719)
36. 1707-1731 Charles-François de Châteauneuf de Rochebonne (1671–1740)
37. 1732-1733 Claude de Rouvroy de Saint-Simon (1695–1760)
38. 1733-1766 Jean-François de La Cropte de Bourzac (1696–1766)
39. 1766-1777 Charles de Broglie (1734–1777)
40. 1777-1790 Louis-André Grimaldi de Cagnes (1736–1808)

=== Six lay peers ===
Duke of Burgundy	Duke of Normandy	Duke of Guyenne	Count of Flanders	Count of Champagne	Count of Toulouse

==== The duke-peer of Burgundy ====
- 10 holders (province returned to royal domain in 1477)
1. Odo III (1166–1218), duke-peer of Burgundy (1193–1218)
2. Hugh IV (1213–1272), duke-peer of Burgundy (1218–1272)
3. Robert II (v.1249-1306), duke-peer of Burgundy (1272–1306)
4. Hugh V (1294–1304), duke-peer of Burgundy (1306–1314)
5. Odo IV (1295–1349), duke-peer of Burgundy (1314–1349)
6. Philip I de Rouvres (1346–1361), duke-peer of Burgundy (1349–1361)
7. Philip II the Bold (1342–1404), duke-peer of Burgundy (1364–1404)
8. John the Fearless (1371–1419), duke-peer of Burgundy (1404–1419)
9. Philip III the Good (1396–1467), duke-peer of Burgundy (1419–1467)
10. Charles the Bold, aka Charles the Rash (1433–1477), duke-peer of Burgundy (1467–1477)

==== The duke-peer of Normandy ====
- 5 holders (province returned to royal domain in 1204)
1. Richard Plantagenet, "Coeur de Lion" (1157–1199), duke-peer of Normandy (1189–1199), king of England
2. John Plantagenet, "Lackland" (1167–1216), duke-peer of Normandy (1199–1203), king of England
3. John the Good (1319–1364), duke-peer of Normandy (1331–1350) then king (John II) of France
4. Charles the Wise (1338–1380), duke-peer of Normandy (1355–1364), dauphin of France then king (Charles V) of France
5. Charles of France (1446–1472), duke-peer of Normandy (1465–1469) then of Guyenne

==== The duke-peer of Aquitaine (Guyenne) ====
- 9 holders (province returned to royal domain in 1453)
1. Richard Plantagenet, "Coeur de Lion" (1157–1199), duke-peer of Aquitaine (1180–1199), king of England
2. John Plantagenet, "Lackland" (1167–1216), duke-peer of Aquitaine (1199–1203), king of England
3. Henry III (1207–1272), duke-peer of Guyenne (1259–1272), king of England
4. Edward I (1239–1307), duke-peer of Guyenne (1272–1294 and 1299–1307), king of England
5. Edward II (1284–1327), duke-peer of Guyenne (1307–1327), king of England
6. Edward III (1312–1377), duke-peer of Guyenne (1327–1336 and 1361–1362), king of England
7. Edward the Black Prince (1330–1376), duke-peer of Guyenne (1362–1370), prince of Wales
8. Louis of France (1397–1415), duke-peer of Guyenne (1400–1415), dauphin of France
9. Charles of France (1446–1472), duke-peer of Guyenne (1469–1472)

==== The count-peer of Flanders ====
- 15 holders (province ceded in 1526, by the Treaty of Madrid, but not ratified; finally ceded in Treaty of Cateau-Cambrésis)
1. Baldwin IX (1171–1206), count-peer of Flanders (1195–1206), emperor (Baldwin I) of Constantinople
2. Ferrand or Ferdinand of Portugal (1188–1233), count-peer of Flanders (1212–1233)
3. Thomas II of Savoy (v.1199-1259), count-peer of Flanders (1237–1244)
4. William de Dampierre (1224–1251), count-peer of Flanders (1245–1251)
5. Guy I de Dampierre (1225–1305), count-peer of Flanders (1251–1300)
6. Robert III de Dampierre (1239–1322), count-peer of Flanders (1305–1322)
7. Louis I de Dampierre (v.1304-1346), count-peer of Flanders (1322–1346)
8. Louis II de Dampierre (1330–1384), count-peer of Flanders (1346–1384)
9. Philip II the Bold (1342–1404), count-peer of Flanders (1384–1404), duke-peer of Burgundy
10. John the Fearless (1371–1419), count-peer of Flanders (1404–1419), duke-peer of Burgundy
11. Philip III the Good (1396–1467), count-peer of Flanders (1419–1467), duke-peer of Burgundy
12. Charles the Bold, aka Charles the Rash (1433–1477), count-peer of Flanders (1467–1477), duke-peer of Burgundy
13. Maximilian I of Austria (1459–1519), count-peer of Flanders (1477–1482) then German emperor
14. Philip the Handsome (1478–1506), count-peer of Flanders (1482–1506), king (Philip I) of Castile
15. Charles of Austria (1500–1558), count-peer of Flanders (1506–1526), king (Charles I of Spain) and German emperor (Charles V)

==== The count-peer of Champagne ====
- 8 holders (province returned to royal domain in 1314)
1. Theobald III de Blois (1179–1201), count-peer of Champagne (1197–1201)
2. Theobald IV de Blois (1201–1253), count-peer of Champagne (1201–1253), king (Theobald I) of Navarre
3. Theobald V de Blois (1235–1270), count-peer of Champagne (1253–1270), king (Theobald II) of Navarre
4. Henri III de Blois (+1274), count-peer of Champagne (1270–1274), king (Henry I) of Navarre
5. Joan I de Blois (1273–1305), countess-peer of Champagne (1274–1305), queen of Navarre
6. Louis le Hutin (1289–1316), count-peer of Champagne (1305–1314) then king (Louis X) of France
7. Joan II (1311–1349), countess-peer of Champagne (1316–1318) then queen of Navarre
8. Charles the Bad (1332–1387), titular count-peer of Champagne (1349–1353), king (Charles II) of Navarre

==== The count-peer of Toulouse ====
- 4 holders (province returned to royal domain in 1229 and 1271)
1. Raymond VI (1156–1222), count-peer of Toulouse (1194–1215 and 1218–1222)
2. Simon de Montfort (v.1158-1218), count-peer of Toulouse (1215–1218)
3. Raymond VII (1197–1249), count-peer of Toulouse (1222–1249)
4. Alphonse II of France (1220–1271), count-peer of Toulouse (1220–1271)

== Later peers ==
Since 1204, when the duchies of Normandy and Aquitaine were absorbed into the French crown, the roster of the Twelve Peers had never been complete. By 1297, there were only three lay peers — the duke of Burgundy, the duke of Guyenne, and the count of Flanders (the county of Champagne was held by the king's eldest son and heir). Philip IV decided to restore the number of peers to twelve by granting peerage to three princes of the royal line — the duke of Brittany, the count of Anjou, and the count of Artois.

=== 13th century ===
Duke of Brittany	Count of Anjou	Count of Artois

==== The duke-peer of Brittany ====
- 14 holders, peerage in 1297 (duchy attached to royal domain in 1532)
1. John II (1239–1305), duke-peer of Brittany (1239–1305)
2. Arthur II (1262–1312), duke-peer of Brittany (1305–1312)
3. John III (1286–1341), duke-peer of Brittany (1312–1341)
4. Charles de Blois (1319–1364), duke-peer of Brittany (1341–1364)
5. John V (1341–1399), duke-peer of Brittany (1365–1399)
6. John VI (1389–1442), duke-peer of Brittany (1399–1442)
7. Francis I (1414–1450), duke-peer of Brittany (1442–1450)
8. Peter II (1418–1457), duke-peer of Brittany (1450–1457)
9. Arthur III (1393–1458), duke-peer of Brittany (1457–1458)
10. Francis II (1435–1488), duke-peer of Brittany (1458–1488)
11. Anne (1477–1514), duchess-peeress of Brittany (1488–1514), queen of France
12. Claude of France (1499–1524), duchess-peeress of Brittany (1514–1524), queen of France
13. Francis of France (1518–1536), duke-peer of Brittany (1524–1536), dauphin of France
14. Henry of France (1519–1559), duke-peer of Brittany (1536–1547), dauphin of France then king (Henry II) of France

==== The count-peer of Anjou ====
- 12 holders, peerage in 1297 (appanage several times returned to royal domain, elevated to duchy in 1360)
1. Charles I de Valois (1270–1325), count-peer of Anjou (1297–1325)
2. Philip de Valois (1293–1350), count-peer of Anjou (1325–1328) then king (Philip VI) of France
3. John the Good (1319–1364), count-peer of Anjou (1331–1350) and duke-peer of Normandy then king (John II) of France
4. Louis I d'Anjou (1339–1384), count then duke of Anjou, peer (1356–1384)
5. Louis II d'Anjou (1377–1417), duke-peer of Anjou (1384–1417), king of Naples
6. Louis III d'Anjou (1403–1434), duke-peer of Anjou (1417–1434)
7. René I d'Anjou (1409–1480), duke-peer of Anjou (1434–1480), king of Naples
8. Charles d'Anjou (1436–1481), duke-peer of Anjou (1480–1481)
9. Louise of Savoy (1476–1531), duchess-peeress of Anjou (1515–1531)
10. Henry of France (1551–1589), duke-peer of Anjou (1566–1574) then king (Henry III) of France
11. Francis of France (1554–1584), duke-peer of Anjou (1576–1584)
12. Louis of France (1755–1824), duke-peer of Anjou (1771–1790) then king (Louis XVIII) of France

==== The count-peer of Artois ====
- 14 holders, peerage in 1297 (appanage several times returned to royal domain)
1. Robert II d'Artois (1250–1302), count-peer of Artois (1297–1302)
2. Robert III d'Artois (1287–1342), count-peer of Artois (1302–1309) then of Beaumont-le-Roger
3. Mahaut d'Artois (v.1268-1329), countess-peeress of Artois (1309–1329)
4. Joan de Chalon (1294–1330), countess-peeress of Artois (1329–1330)
5. Joan of France (1308–1347), countess-peeress of Artois (1330–1347)
6. Philip I de Rouvre (1346–1361), count-peer of Artois (1347–1361) and duke-peer of Burgundy
7. Marguerite of France (v.1310-1382), countess-peeress of Artois (1361–1382)
8. Louis II de Dampierre (1330–1384), count-peer of Artois (1382–1384) and of Flanders
9. Philip II the Bold (1342–1404), count-peer of Artois (1384–1404) and duke-peer of Burgundy
10. John the Fearless (1371–1419), count-peer of Artois (1404–1419) and duke-peer of Burgundy
11. Philip III the Good (1396–1467), count-peer of Artois (1419–1467) and duke-peer of Burgundy
12. Charles the Bold/Rash (1433–1477), count-peer of Artois (1467–1477) and duke-peer of Burgundy
13. Philip the Handsome (1478–1506), count-peer of Artois (1493–1506) and of Flanders, king (Philip I) of Castile
14. Charles of Austria (1500–1558), count-peer of Artois (1506–1526) and of Flanders, king (Charles I) of Spain and Holy Roman Emperor (Charles V)

=== 14th century ===
Châteauneuf-en-Thymerais

- barony-peerage in 1314, 8 holders
1. Charles I de Valois (1270–1325), baron-peer of Châteauneuf (1314–1325)
2. Charles II de Valois-Alençon (v.1297-1346), baron-peer of Châteauneuf (1325–1346)
3. Charles III d'Alençon (1337–1375), baron-peer of Châteauneuf (1346–1361)
4. Pierre II d'Alençon (1340–1404), baron-peer of Châteauneuf (1361–1404)
5. John IV d'Alençon (1385–1415), baron-peer of Châteauneuf (1404–1415)
6. John V d'Alençon (v.1407-1476), baron-peer of Châteauneuf (1415–1458 and 1461–1474)
7. René d'Alençon (v.1454-1492), baron-peer of Châteauneuf (1483–1492)
8. Charles IV d'Alençon (1489–1525), baron-peer of Châteauneuf (1492–1525)

Poitou

- county-peerage in 1315, 5 holders
1. Philip the Tall (1293–1322), count-peer of Poitiers (1315–1316) then king (Philip V) of France
2. Jean de Berry (1340–1416), count-peer of Poitiers (1356–1416)
3. John of France (1398–1417), count-peer of Poitiers (1416–1417), dauphin of France
4. Charles of France (1403–1461), count-peer of Poitiers (1417–1422), dauphin of France then king (Charles VII) of France
5. Charles of France (1757–1836), count-peer of Poitou (1778–1790) then king (Charles X) of France

La Marche

- county-peerage in 1316, 12 holders
1. Charles the Fair (1294–1328), count-peer of La Marche (1316–1322) then king (Charles IV) of France
2. Louis I de Bourbon (1270–1342), count-peer of La Marche (1327–1342)
3. Jacques I de Bourbon (1315–1361), count-peer of La Marche (1342–1361)
4. Pierre de Bourbon (1342–1361), count-peer of La Marche (1361)
5. Jean de Bourbon (v.1343–1393), count-peer of La Marche (1361–1393)
6. Jacques II de Bourbon (1370–1438), count-peer of La Marche (1393–1438)
7. Bernard d'Armagnac (1402–1462), count-peer of La Marche (1438–1462)
8. Jacques d'Armagnac (1433–1477), count-peer of La Marche (1462–1477)
9. Pierre II de Bourbon (1439–1503), count-peer of La Marche (1477–1503)
10. Suzanne de Bourbon (1491–1521), countess-peeress of La Marche (1503–1521)
11. Charles III de Bourbon (1490–1527), count-peer of La Marche (1505–1527)
12. Charles of France (1522–1545), count-peer of La Marche (1540–1545)

Évreux

- county then duchy, peerage in 1316, 6 holders
1. Louis I d'Evreux (1276–1319), count-peer of Evreux (1316–1319)
2. Philippe d'Evreux (1301–1343), count-peer of Evreux (1326–1343) and king (Philip III) of Navarre
3. Charles the Bad (1332–1387), count-peer of Evreux (1343–1387) and of Evreux, king (Charles II) of Navarre
4. Charles the Noble (1361–1425), count-peer of Evreux (1387–1404), king (Charles III) of Navarre
5. John Stewart of Darnley (+1428), count-peer of Evreux (1426)
6. Francis of France (1554–1584), duke-peer of Evreux (1569–1584) and of Anjou

Angoulême

- county then duchy, peerage in 1317, 11 holders
1. Philip d'Evreux (1301–1343), count-peer of Angoulême (1317–1343) and of Evreux, king (Philip III) of Navarre
2. Charles the Bad (1332–1387), count-peer of Angoulême (1343–1349) and of Evreux, king (Charles II) of Navarre
3. Jean de Berry (1340–1416), count-peer of Angoulême (1356–1373) and of Poitiers
4. Louis I d'Orléans (1372–1407), count-peer of Angoulême (1394–1407)
5. John d'Orléans-Angoulême (1404–1467), count-peer of Angoulême (1407–1467)
6. Charles d'Angoulême (1460–1496), count-peer of Angoulême (1467–1496)
7. Francis d'Angoulême (1494–1547), count-peer of Angoulême (1496–1515) then king (Francis I) of France
8. Louise of Savoy (1476–1531), duchess-peeress of Angoulême (1515–1531) and of Anjou
9. Charles of France (1522–1545), duke-peer of Angoulême (1540–1545) and count-peer of La Marche
10. Charles de Berry (1686–1714), duke-peer of Angoulême (1710–1714)
11. Charles of France (1757–1836), duke-peer of Angoulême (1773–1790) and count-peer of Poitou then king (Charles X) of France

Mortain

- county-peerage in 1317, 5 holders
1. Philip d'Evreux (1301–1343), count-peer of Mortain (1317–1343) and of Evreux, king (Philip III) of Navarre
2. Charles the Bad (1332–1387), count-peer of Mortain (1343–1349) and of Evreux, king (Charles II) of Navarre
3. Peter d'Evreux (1366–1412), count-peer of Mortain (1408–1412) and baron-peer of Coulommiers
4. Louis of France (1397–1415), count-peer of Mortain (1414–1415) and duke-peer of Guyenne, dauphin of France
5. Charles of France (1446–1472), count-peer of Mortain (1465–1472) and duke-peer of Normandy

Étampes

- county-peerage in 1327, 2 holders
1. Charles d'Evreux (v.1305-1336), count-peer of Etampes (1327–1336)
2. Louis II d'Evreux (1336–1400), count-peer of Etampes (1336–1400)

Bourbon

- duchy-peerage in 1327, 17 holders
1. Louis I de Bourbon (1270–1342), duke-peer of Bourbon (1327–1342) and count-peer of La Marche
2. Peter I de Bourbon (1311–1356), duke-peer of Bourbon (1342–1356)
3. Louis II de Bourbon (1337–1410), duke-peer of Bourbon (1356–1410)
4. Jean I de Bourbon (1380–1434), duke-peer of Bourbon (1410–1434)
5. Charles I de Bourbon (1401–1456), duke-peer of Bourbon (1434–1456)
6. Jean II de Bourbon (1427–1488), duke-peer of Bourbon (1456–1488)
7. Charles II de Bourbon (v.1434-1488), duke-peer of Bourbon (1488)
8. Peter II de Bourbon (1439–1503), duke-peer of Bourbon (1488–1503) and count-peer of La Marche
9. Suzanne de Bourbon (1491–1521), duchess-peeress of Bourbon (1503–1521) and countess-peeress of La Marche
10. Charles III de Bourbon (1490–1527), duke-peer of Bourbon (1505–1527) and count-peer of La Marche
11. Louise of Savoy (1476–1531), duchess-peeress of Bourbon (1527–1531) and of Anjou
12. Charles of France (1522–1545), duke-peer of Bourbon (1544–1545) and of Angoulême
13. Henry of France (1551–1589), duke-peer of Bourbon (1566–1574) and of Anjou then king (Henry III) of France
14. Louis II de Bourbon-Condé (1621–1686), duke-peer of Bourbon (1661–1685)
15. Louis III de Bourbon-Condé (1668–1710), duke-peer of Bourbon (1685–1710)
16. Louis-Henri de Bourbon-Condé (1692–1740), duke-peer of Bourbon (1710–1740)
17. Louis-Joseph de Bourbon-Condé (1736–1818), duke-peer of Bourbon (1740–1790)

Beaumont-le-Roger

- county-peerage in 1328, 5 holders
1. Robert III d'Artois (1287–1342), count-peer of Beaumont-le-Roger (1328–1331)
2. Philippe I d'Orléans (1336–1375), count-peer of Beaumont-le-Roger (1344–1353)
3. Charles the Bad (1332–1387), count-peer of Beaumont-le-Roger (1354–1387) and of Evreux, king (Charles II) of Navarre
4. Charles the Noble (1361–1425), count-peer of Beaumont-le-Roger (1387–1404) and of Evreux, king (Charles III) of Navarre
5. Francis of France (1554–1584), count-peer of Beaumont-le-Roger (1569–1584) and duke-peer of Anjou

Clermont-en-Beauvaisis

- county-peerage in 1331, 11 holders
1. Louis I de Bourbon (1270–1342), count-peer of Clermont (1331–1342) and duke-peer of Bourbon
2. Peter I de Bourbon (1311–1356), count-peer of Clermont (1342–1356) and duke-peer of Bourbon
3. Louis II de Bourbon (1337–1410), count-peer of Clermont (1356–1410) and duke-peer of Bourbon
4. Jean I de Bourbon (1380–1434), count-peer of Clermont (1410–1434) and duke-peer of Bourbon
5. Charles I de Bourbon (1401–1456), count-peer of Clermont (1434–1456) and duke-peer of Bourbon
6. Jean II de Bourbon (1427–1488), count-peer of Clermont (1456–1488) and duke-peer of Bourbon
7. Gilbert de Bourbon (1443–1496), count-peer of Clermont (1488–1496)
8. Louis de Bourbon (1483–1501), count-peer of Clermont (1496–1501)
9. Charles III de Bourbon (1490–1527), count-peer of Clermont (1501–1527) and duke-peer of Bourbon
10. Louise of Savoy (1476–1531), countess-peeress of Clermont (1528–1531) and duchess-peeress of Anjou
11. Charles of France (1522–1545), count-peer of Clermont (1540–1545) and duke-peer of Angoulême

Maine

- county-peerage in 1331, 8 holders
1. John the Good (1319–1364), count-peer of Maine (1331–1350) and duke-peer of Normandy then king (John II) of France
2. Louis I d'Anjou (1339–1384), count-peer of Maine (1360–1384) and duke-peer of Anjou
3. Louis II d'Anjou (1377–1417), count-peer of Maine (1384–1417) and duke-peer of Anjou, king of Naples
4. Louis III d'Anjou (1403–1434), count-peer of Maine (1417–1434) and duke-peer of Anjou
5. Charles d'Anjou (1414–1472), count-peer of Maine (1434–1472)
6. Charles d'Anjou (1436–1481), count-peer of Maine (1472–1481) and duke-peer of Anjou
7. Louise of Savoy (1476–1531), countess-peeress of Maine (1515–1531) and duchess-peeress of Anjou
8. Louis of France (1755–1824), count-peer of Maine (1771–1790) and duke-peer of Anjou then king (Louis XVIII) of France

Orléans

- duchy-peerage in 1344, 11 holders
1. Philippe I d'Orléans (1336–1375), duke-peer of Orléans (1344–1375) and count-peer of Beaumont-le-Roger
2. Louis I d'Orléans (1372–1407), duke-peer of Orléans (1392–1407) and count-peer of Angoulême
3. Charles I d'Orléans (1391–1465), duke-peer of Orléans (1407–1465)
4. Louis II d'Orléans (1462–1515), duke-peer of Orléans (1465–1498) then king (Louis XII) of France
5. Charles of France (1522–1545), duke-peer of Orléans (1540–1545) and of Angoulême
6. Gaston d'Orléans (1608–1660), duke-peer of Orléans (1626–1660)
7. Philippe II d'Orléans (1640–1701), duke-peer of Orléans (1661–1701)
8. Philippe III d'Orléans (1674–1723), duke-peer of Orléans (1701–1723)
9. Louis III d'Orléans (1703–1752), duke-peer of Orléans (1723–1752)
10. Louis-Philippe I d'Orléans (1725–1785), duke-peer of Orléans (1752–1785)
11. Louis-Philippe-Joseph d'Orléans (1747–1793), duke-peer of Orléans (1785–1790)

Valois

- county then duchy, peerage in 1344, 11 holders
1. Philip I d'Orléans (1336–1375), count-peer of Valois (1344–1375) and duke-peer of Orléans
2. Louis I d'Orléans (1372–1407), count then duke of Valois, peer (1386–1407) and of Orléans
3. Charles I d'Orléans (1391–1465), duke-peer of Valois (1407–1465) and of Orléans
4. Louis II d'Orléans (1462–1515), duke-peer of Valois (1465–1498) and of Orléans then king (Louis XII) of France
5. Francis d'Angoulême (1494–1547), duke-peer of Valois (1498–1515) and count-peer of Angoulême then king (Francis I) of France
6. Gaston d'Orléans (1608–1660), duke-peer of Valois (1630–1661) and of Orléans
7. Philip II d'Orléans (1640–1701), duke-peer of Valois (1661–1701) and of Orléans
8. Philip III d'Orléans (1674–1723), duke-peer of Valois (1701–1723) and of Orléans
9. Louis III d'Orléans (1703–1752), duke-peer of Valois (1723–1752) and of Orléans
10. Louis-Philip I d'Orléans (1725–1785), duke-peer of Valois (1752–1785) and of Orléans
11. Louis-Philippe-Joseph d'Orléans (1747–1793), duke-peer of Valois (1785–1790) and of Orléans

Nevers

- county then duchy, peerage in 1347, 18 holders
1. Marguerite of France (v.1310-1382), countess-peeress of Nevers (1347–1382) and of Artois
2. Louis II de Dampierre (1330–1384), count-peer of Nevers (1347–1384) and of Flanders
3. Charles of Burgundy (1414–1464), count-peer of Nevers (1459–1464)
4. John of Burgundy (1415–1491), count-peer of Nevers (1464–1491)
5. Engelbert de Clèves (1462–1506), count-peer of Nevers (1505–1506)
6. Charles de Clèves (+1521), count-peer of Nevers (1506–1521)
7. Marie d'Albret (1492–1549), countess-peeress of Nevers (1521–1549)
8. François I de Clèves (1516–1562), duke-peer of Nevers (1539–1562)
9. François II de Clèves (1540–1563), duke-peer of Nevers (1562–1563)
10. Jacques de Clèves (1544–1564), duke-peer of Nevers (1563–1564)
11. Henriette de Clèves (1542–1601), duchess-peeress of Nevers (1564–1601)
12. Louis de Gonzague (1539–1595), duke-peer of Nevers (1566–1595)
13. Charles I Gonzaga (1580–1637), duke-peer of Nevers (1595–1637)
14. Charles III Gonzaga (1629–1665), duke-peer of Nevers (1637–1659)
15. Jules Mazarin (1602–1661), duke-peer of Nevers (1660–1661), cardinal
16. Philippe-Julien Mancini-Mazarin (1641–1707), duke-peer of Nevers (1661–1707)
17. Philippe-Jules Mancini-Mazarin (1676–1768), duke-peer of Nevers (1707–1730)
18. Louis-Jules Mancini-Mazarin (1716–1798), duke-peer of Nevers (1730–1790)

Rethel then Rethel-Mazarin

- county then duchy, peerage in 1347, 14 holders
1. Marguerite de France (v.1310-1382), countess-peeress of Rethel (1347–1382) and of Artois
2. Louis II de Dampierre (1330–1384), count-peer of Rethel (1347–1384) and of Flanders
3. Antoine de Burgundy (1384–1415), count-peer of Rethel (1405–1415)
4. Charles de Burgundy (1414–1464), count-peer of Rethel (1461–1464) and of Nevers
5. Jean de Burgundy (1415–1491), count-peer of Rethel (1464–1491) and of Nevers
6. Louis Gonzaga (1539–1595), count then duke of Rethel, peer (1573–1595) and of Nevers
7. Charles I Gonzaga (1580–1637), duke-peer of Rethel (1595–1622) and of Nevers
8. Charles II Gonzaga (1609–1631), duke-peer of Rethel (1622–1631)
9. Charles III Gonzaga (1629–1665), duke-peer of Rethel (1631–1659) and of Nevers
10. Hortense Mancini-Mazarin (1646–1699), duchess-peeress of Rethel-Mazarin (1663–1699)
11. Armand-Charles de La Porte (1632–1713), duke-peer of Rethel-Mazarin (1663–1713)
12. Paul-Jules de La Porte-Mazarin (1666–1731), duke-peer of Rethel-Mazarin (1713–1716)
13. Guy-Paul-Jules de La Porte-Mazarin (1708–1738), duke-peer of Rethel-Mazarin (1716–1738)
14. Louise-Jeanne de Durfort (1735–1781), duchess-peeress of Rethel-Mazarin (1738–1747)

==== Mid-14th century ====
Mantes-et-Meulan

- county-peerage in 1354, 3 holders
1. Charles the Bad (1332–1387), count-peer of Mantes-et-Meulan (1354–1364 and 1382–1387) and of Evreux, king (Charles II) of Navarre
2. Charles the Noble (1361–1425), count-peer of Mantes-et-Meulan (1387–1404) and of Evreux, king (Charles III) of Navarre
3. Francis of France (1554–1584), count-peer of Mantes-et-Meulan (1566–1584) and duke-peer of Anjou

Mâcon

- county-peerage in 1359, 3 holders
1. Jean de Berry (1340–1416), count-peer of Mâcon (1359–1360) and of Poitiers
2. Philip III the Good (1396–1467), count-peer of Mâcon (1435–1467) and duke-peer of Burgundy
3. Charles the Bold/Rash (1433–1477), count-peer of Mâcon (1467–1477) and duke-peer of Burgundy

Berry

- duchy-peerage in 1360, 10 holders
1. Jean de Berry (1340–1416), duke-peer of Berry (1360–1416) and count-peer of Poitiers
2. John of France (1398–1417), duke-peer of Berry (1416–1417) and count-peer of Poitiers, dauphin of France
3. Charles of France (1403–1461), duke-peer of Berry (1417–1422) and count-peer of Poitiers, dauphin of France then king (Charles VII) of France
4. Charles of France (1446–1472), duke-peer of Berry (1461–1465) then of Normandy
5. Marguerite d'Angoulême (1492–1549), duchess-peeress of Berry (1517–1549)
6. Henry d'Albret (1503–1555), duke-peer of Berry (1527–1549), king (Henry II) of Navarre
7. Marguerite of France (1523–1574), duchess-peeress of Berry (1550–1574)
8. Emmanuel-Philibert of Savoy (1528–1580), duke-peer of Berry (1559–1574), duke of Savoy
9. Francis of France (1554–1584), duke-peer of Berry (1576–1584) and of Anjou
10. Charles of France (1757–1836), duke-peer of Berry (1776–1790) and of Angoulême then king (Charles X) of France

Auvergne

- duchy-peerage in 1360, 11 holders
1. Jean de Berry (1340–1416), duke-peer of Auvergne (1360–1416) and of Berry
2. Jean I de Bourbon (1380–1434), duke-peer of Auvergne (1425–1434) and of Bourbon
3. Charles I de Bourbon (1401–1456), duke-peer of Auvergne (1434–1456) and of Bourbon
4. Jean II de Bourbon (1427–1488), duke-peer of Auvergne (1456–1488) and of Bourbon
5. Charles II de Bourbon (v.1434-1488), duke-peer of Auvergne (1488) and of Bourbon
6. Peter II de Bourbon (1439–1503), duke-peer of Auvergne (1488–1503) and of Bourbon
7. Suzanne de Bourbon (1491–1521), duchess-peeress of Auvergne (1503–1521) and of Bourbon
8. Charles III de Bourbon (1490–1527), duke-peer of Auvergne (1505–1527) and of Bourbon
9. Louise of Savoy (1476–1531), duchess-peeress of Auvergne (1528–1531) and of Anjou
10. Henry of France (1551–1589), duke-peer of Auvergne (1569–1574) and of Anjou then king (Henry III) of France
11. Charles of France (1757–1836), duke-peer of Auvergne (1773–1778) and of Angoulême then king (Charles X) of France

Touraine

- duchy-peerage in 1360, 8 holders
1. Philip the Bold (1342–1404), duke-peer of Touraine (1360–1364) then of Burgundy
2. Louis I d'Anjou (1339–1384), duke-peer of Touraine (1364) and of Anjou
3. Louis I d'Orléans (1372–1407), duke-peer of Touraine (1386–1392) then of Orléans
4. John of France (1398–1417), duke-peer of Touraine (1414–1416) and of Berry, dauphin of France
5. Charles of France (1403–1461), duke-peer of Touraine (1416–1422) and of Berry, dauphin of France then king (Charles VII) of France
6. Archibald Douglas (1369–1424), duke-peer of Touraine (1423–1424)
7. Louis III d'Anjou (1403–1434), duke-peer of Touraine (1424–1434) and of Anjou
8. Francis of France (1554–1584), duke-peer of Touraine (1576–1584) and of Anjou

Vertus

- county-peerage in 1361, 4 holders
1. Isabelle of France (1348–1373), countess-peeress of Vertus (1361–1373)
2. Gian Galeazzo Visconti (1351–1402), count-peer of Vertus (1361–1402), duke of Milan
3. Louis I d'Orléans (1372–1407), count-peer of Vertus (1403–1407) and duke-peer of Orléans
4. Philippe d'Orléans (1396–1420), count-peer of Vertus (1412–1420)

Alençon

- county then duchy, peerage in 1367, 8 holders
1. Peter II d'Alençon (1340–1404), count-peer of Alençon (1367–1404) and baron-peer of Châteauneuf
2. John IV d'Alençon (1385–1415), count then duke of Alençon, peer (1404–1415) and baron-peer of Châteauneuf
3. John V d'Alençon (v.1407-1476), duke-peer of Alençon (1415–1458 and 1461–1474) and baron-peer of Châteauneuf
4. René d'Alençon (v.1454-1492), duke-peer of Alençon (1483–1492) and baron-peer of Châteauneuf
5. Charles IV d'Alençon (1489–1525), duke-peer of Alençon (1492–1525) and baron-peer of Châteauneuf
6. Francis of France (1554–1584), duke-peer of Alençon (1566–1584) and of Anjou
7. Charles de Berry (1686–1714), duke-peer of Alençon (1710–1714) and of Angoulême
8. Louis of France (1755–1824), duke-peer of Alençon (1774–1790) and of Anjou then king (Louis XVIII) of France

Montpellier

- barony-peerage in 1371, 1 holder
1. Charles the Bad (1332–1387), baron-peer of Montpellier (1371–1372) and count-peer of Evreux, king (Charles II) of Navarre

Forez

- county-peerage in 1372, 10 holders
1. Louis II de Bourbon (1337–1410), count-peer of Forez (1372–1410) and duke-peer of Bourbon
2. Jean I de Bourbon (1380–1434), count-peer of Forez (1410–1434) and duke-peer of Bourbon
3. Charles I de Bourbon (1401–1456), count-peer of Forez (1434–1456) and duke-peer of Bourbon
4. Jean II de Bourbon (1427–1488), count-peer of Forez (1456–1488) and duke-peer of Bourbon
5. Charles II de Bourbon (v.1434-1488), count-peer of Forez (1488) and duke-peer of Bourbon
6. Peter II de Bourbon (1439–1503), count-peer of Forez (1488–1503) and duke-peer of Bourbon
7. Suzanne de Bourbon (1491–1521), countess-peeress of Forez (1503–1521) and duchess-peeress of Bourbon
8. Charles III de Bourbon (1490–1527), count-peer of Forez (1505–1527) and duke-peer of Bourbon
9. Louise de Bourbon (1482–1562), countess-peeress of Forez (1530–1531)
10. Henry of France (1551–1589), count-peer of Forez (1566–1574) and duke-peer of Anjou then king (Henry III) of France

Roannais

- barony then duchy, peerage in 1372, 11 holders
1. Louis II de Bourbon (1337–1410), baron-peer of Roannais (1372–1410) and duke-peer of Bourbon
2. Jean I de Bourbon (1380–1434), baron-peer of Roannais (1410–1434) and duke-peer of Bourbon
3. Charles I de Bourbon (1401–1456), baron-peer of Roannais (1434–1456) and duke-peer of Bourbon
4. Jean II de Bourbon (1427–1488), baron-peer of Roannais (1456–1488)et duke-peer of Bourbon
5. Charles II de Bourbon (v.1434-1488), baron-peer of Roannais (1488) and duke-peer of Bourbon
6. Peter II de Bourbon (1439–1503), baron-peer of Roannais (1488–1503) and duke-peer of Bourbon
7. Suzanne de Bourbon (1491–1521), baroness-peeress of Roannais (1503–1515) and duchess-peeress of Bourbon
8. Artus Gouffier (1474–1519), duke-peer of Roannais (1519)
9. Artus Gouffier (1627–1696), duke-peer of Roannais (1642–1667)
10. François d'Aubusson de La Feuillade (1634–1691), duke-peer of Roannais (1667–1690)
11. Louis d'Aubusson de La Feuillade (1673–1725), peer with the courtesy title of duke of La Feuillade (1690–1691) then duke-peer of Roannais (1691–1725)

Blois

- county-peerage in 1399, 4 holders
1. Louis I d'Orléans (1372–1407), count-peer of Blois (1399–1407) and duke-peer of Orléans
2. Charles I d'Orléans (1391–1465), count-peer of Blois (1407–1465) and duke-peer of Orléans
3. Louis II d'Orléans (1462–1515), count-peer of Blois (1465–1498) and duke-peer of Orléans then king (Louis XII) of France
4. Gaston d'Orléans (1608–1660), count-peer of Blois (1626–1660) and duke-peer of Orléans

Chartres

- county then duchy, peerage in 1399, 9 holders
1. Louis I d'Orléans (1372–1407), count-peer of Chartres (1399–1407) and duke-peer of Orléans
2. Charles I d'Orléans (1391–1465), count-peer of Chartres (1407–1465) and duke-peer of Orléans
3. Louis II d'Orléans (1462–1515), count-peer of Chartres (1465–1498) and duke-peer of Orléans then king (Louis XII) of France
4. Gaston d'Orléans (1608–1660), duke-peer of Chartres (1626–1660) and of Orléans
5. Philippe II d'Orléans (1640–1701), duke-peer of Chartres (1661–1701) and of Orléans
6. Philippe III d'Orléans (1674–1723), duke-peer of Chartres (1701–1723) and of Orléans
7. Louis III d'Orléans (1703–1752), duke-peer of Chartres (1723–1752) and of Orléans
8. Louis-Philippe I d'Orléans (1725–1785), duke-peer of Chartres (1752–1785) and of Orléans
9. Louis-Philippe-Joseph d'Orléans (1747–1793), duke-peer of Chartres (1785–1790) and of Orléans

Dunois

- viscounty then duchy, peerage in 1399, 4 holders
1. Louis I d'Orléans (1372–1407), viscount-peer of Dunois (1399–1407) and duke-peer of Orléans
2. Charles I d'Orléans (1391–1465), viscount-peer of Dunois (1407–1465) and duke-peer of Orléans
3. Louis II d'Orléans (1462–1515), viscount-peer of Dunois (1465–1498) and duke-peer of Orléans then king (Louis XII) of France
4. Louis d'Orléans (1510–1537), duke-peer of Dunois (1525–1537)

Fère-en-Tardenois

- barony-peerage in 1399, 5 holders
1. Louis I d'Orléans (1372–1407), baron-peer of Fère-en-Tardenois (1399–1407) and duke-peer of Orléans
2. Charles I d'Orléans (1391–1465), baron-peer of Fère-en-Tardenois (1407–1465) and duke-peer of Orléans
3. Louis II d'Orléans (1462–1515), baron-peer of Fère-en-Tardenois (1465–1498) and duke-peer of Orléans then king (Louis XII) of France
4. Francis d'Angoulême (1494–1547), baron-peer of Fère-en-Tardenois (1498–1515) and count-peer of Angoulême then king (Francis I) of France
5. Louise of Savoy (1476–1531), baroness-peeress of Fère-en-Tardenois (1515–1531) and duchess-peeress of Anjou

Chateau-Thierry

- duchy-peerage in 1400, 7 holders
1. Louis I d'Orléans (1372–1407), duke-peer of Château-Thierry (1400–1407) and of Orléans
2. Francis of France (1554–1584), duke-peer of Château-Thierry (1566–1584) and of Anjou
3. Frédéric Maurice de La Tour d'Auvergne (1605–1652), duke-peer of Château-Thierry (1651–1652)
4. Godefroy-Maurice de La Tour d'Auvergne (1641–1721), duke-peer of Château-Thierry (1641–1721)
5. Emmanuel-Théodose de La Tour d'Auvergne (1668–1730), duke-peer of Château-Thierry (1721–1730)
6. Charles Godefroy de La Tour d'Auvergne (1706–1771), duke-peer of Château-Thierry (1730–1771)
7. Godefroy Charles de La Tour d'Auvergne (1728–1792), duke-peer of Château-Thierry (1771–1790)

Périgord

- county-peerage in 1400, 2 holders
1. Louis I d'Orléans (1372–1407), count-peer of Périgord (1400–1407) and duke-peer of Orléans
2. Charles I d'Orléans (1391–1465), count-peer of Périgord (1407–1437) and duke-peer of Orléans

=== 15th century ===
Soissons

- county-peerage in 1404, 8 holders
1. Louis I d'Orléans (1372–1407), count-peer of Soissons (1404–1407) and duke-peer of Orléans
2. Charles I d'Orléans (1391–1465), count-peer of Soissons (1412–1465) and duke-peer of Orléans
3. Louis II d'Orléans (1462–1515), count-peer of Soissons (1465–1498) and duke-peer of Orléans then king (Louis XII) of France
4. Claude of France (1499–1524), countess-peeress of Soissons (1506–1524) and duchess-peeress of Brittany, queen of France
5. John de Bourbon (1528–1557), count-peer of Soissons (1542–1557)
6. Louis I de Bourbon-Condé (1530–1569), count-peer of Soissons (1557–1569)
7. Charles de Bourbon (1566–1612), count-peer of Soissons (1569–1612)
8. Louis de Bourbon (1604–1641), count-peer of Soissons (1612–1641)

Coucy

- barony-peerage in 1404, 4 holders
1. Louis I d'Orléans (1372–1407), baron-peer of Coucy (1404–1407) and duke-peer of Orléans
2. Charles I d'Orléans (1391–1465), baron-peer of Coucy (1412–1465) and duke-peer of Orléans
3. Louis II d'Orléans (1462–1515), baron-peer of Coucy (1465–1498) and duke-peer of Orléans then king (Louis XII) of France
4. Claude of France (1499–1524), baroness-peeress of Coucy (1506–1515) and duchess-peeress of Brittany, queen of France

Nemours

- duchy-peerage in 1404, 17 holders
1. Charles the Noble (1361–1425), duke-peer of Nemours (1404–1425), king (Charles III) of Navarre
2. Blanche of Navarre (1385–1441), titular duchess of Nemours, peer (1437–1441), queen of Navarre
3. John II of Aragon (1397–1479), titular duke of Nemours, peer (1437–1441), king of Aragon and of Navarre
4. Charles de Viane (1421–1461), titular duke of Nemours, peer (1441–1461)
5. Bernard d'Armagnac (1402–1462), duke-peer of Nemours (1461–1462) and count-peer of La Marche
6. Éléonore de Bourbon-La Marche (1412–1463), duchess-peeress of Nemours (1461–1463)
7. Jean d'Armagnac (1467–1500), duke-peer of Nemours (1484–1500)
8. Louis d'Armagnac (1472–1503), duke-peer of Nemours (1500–1503)
9. Marguerite d'Armagnac (+1503), duchess-peeress of Nemours (1503)
10. Charlotte d'Armagnac (+1504), duchess-peeress of Nemours (1503–1504)
11. Gaston de Foix (1489–1512), duke-peer of Nemours (1507–1512)
12. Germaine de Foix (v.1490-1538), duchess-peeress of Nemours (1517–1538)
13. Philippe II d'Orléans (1640–1701), duke-peer of Nemours (1672–1701) and of Orléans
14. Philippe III d'Orléans (1674–1723), duke-peer of Nemours (1701–1723) and of Orléans
15. Louis III d'Orléans (1703–1752), duke-peer of Nemours (1723–1752) and of Orléans
16. Louis-Philippe I d'Orléans (1725–1785), duke-peer of Nemours (1752–1785) and of Orléans
17. Louis-Philippe-Joseph d'Orléans (1747–1793), duke-peer of Nemours (1785–1790) and of Orléans

Châtillon-sur-Marne

- barony-peerage in 1404, 2 holders
1. Louis I d'Orléans (1372–1407), baron-peer of Châtillon (1404–1407)
2. Francis of France (1554–1584), baron-peer of Châtillon (1566–1584) and duke-peer of Anjou

Mortagne-lès-Tournay

- barony-peerage in 1407, 1 holder
1. John of France (1398–1417), baron-peer of Mortagne-lès-Tournay (1407–1417) and duke-peer of Berry, dauphin of France

Évry-le-Châtel

- châtellenie-peerage in 1408

Jouy-le-Châtel

- châtellenie-peerage in 1408

Coulommiers

- barony then duchy, peerage in 1410, 2 holders
1. Pierre d'Evreux (1366–1412), baron-peer of Coulommiers (1410–1412) and count-peer of Mortain
2. Henry II d'Orléans-Dunois (1595–1663), duke-peer of Coulommiers (1654–1663)

Ponthieu

- county-peerage in 1412, 3 holders
1. John of France (1398–1417), count-peer of Ponthieu (1412–1417) and duke-peer of Berry, dauphin of France
2. Charles de Berry (1686–1714), count-peer of Ponthieu (1710–1714) and duke-peer of Angoulême
3. Charles of France (1757–1836), count-peer of Ponthieu (1776–1790) and duke-peer of Angoulême then king (Charles X) of France

Saintonge

- county-peerage in 1428, 1 holder
1. James I Stuart (1394–1437), count-peer of Saintonge (1428–1437), king of Scotland

Auxerre

- county-peerage in 1435, 2 holders
1. Philip III the Good (1396–1467), count-peer of Auxerre (1435–1467) and duke-peer of Burgundy
2. Charles the Bold/Rash (1467–1477), count-peer of Auxerre (1467–1477) and duke-peer of Burgundy

==== Mid-15th century ====
Foix

- county-peerage in 1458, 8 holders
1. Gaston IV de Foix (1422–1472), count-peer of Foix (1458–1472)
2. Francis-Phoebus (1466–1483), count-peer of Foix (1472–1483), king of Navarre
3. John d'Albret (1469–1516), count-peer of Foix (1484–1516), king (John III) of Navarre
4. Catherine de Foix (1470–1517), countess-peeress of Foix (1484–1517), queen of Navarre
5. Henry d'Albret (1503–1555), count-peer of Foix (1517–1555) and duke-peer of Berry, king (Henry II) of Navarre
6. Antoine de Bourbon (1518–1562), count-peer of Foix (1555–1562)
7. Jeanne d'Albret (1528–1572), countess-peeress of Foix (1555–1572), queen (Joan III) of Navarre
8. Henry de Bourbon (1553–1610), count-peer of Foix (1572–1589), king (Henry III) of Navarre, king (Henry IV) of France

Eu

- county-peerage in 1458, 19 holders
1. Charles d'Artois (1394–1472), count-peer of Eu (1458–1472)
2. John de Burgundy (1415–1491), count-peer of Eu (1472–1491) and of Nevers
3. Engelbert de Clèves (1462–1506), count-peer of Eu (1491–1506) and of Nevers
4. Charles de Clèves (+1521), count-peer of Eu (1506–1521) and of Nevers
5. François I de Clèves (1516–1562), count-peer of Eu (1521–1562) and duke-peer of Nevers
6. François II de Clèves (1540–1563), count-peer of Eu (1562–1563) and duke-peer of Nevers
7. Jacques de Clèves (1544–1564), count-peer of Eu (1563–1564) and duke-peer of Nevers
8. Antoine de Croÿ (1541–1567), count-peer of Eu (1566–1567)
9. Catherine de Clèves (1548–1633), countess-peeress of Eu (1566–1633)
10. Henri I de Lorraine (1549–1588), count-peer of Eu (1570–1588)
11. Charles de Lorraine (1571–1640), count-peer of Eu (1633–1640)
12. Henri II de Lorraine (1614–1664), count-peer of Eu (1640–1641 and 1643–1654)
13. Louis de Lorraine (1622–1654), count-peer of Eu (1654)
14. Louis-Joseph de Lorraine (1650–1671), count-peer of Eu (1654–1660)
15. Anne-Marie-Louise d'Orléans (1627–1693), countess-peeress of Eu (1660–1682)
16. Louis-Auguste I de Bourbon (1670–1736), count-peer of Eu (1694–1736)
17. Louis-Auguste II de Bourbon (1700–1755), count-peer of Eu (1736–1755)
18. Louis-Charles de Bourbon (1701–1775), count-peer of Eu (1701–1775)
19. Louis-Jean-Marie de Bourbon (1725–1793), count-peer of Eu (1776–1790)

Beaujeu

- barony-peerage in 1466, 4 holders
1. Jean II de Bourbon (1427–1488), baron-peer of Beaujeu (1466–1475) and duke-peer of Bourbon
2. Peter II de Bourbon (1439–1503), baron-peer of Beaujeu (1475–1503) and duke-peer of Bourbon
3. Charles III de Bourbon (1490–1527), baron-peer of Beaujeu (1505–1527) and duke-peer of Bourbon
4. Louise de Bourbon (1482–1561), baroness-peeress of Beaujeu (1530–1562) and countess-peeress of Forèz

Villefranche

- county-peerage in 1480, 2 holders
1. Frédéric of Aragon (1452–1504), count-peer of Villefranche (1480–1504), king (Frédéric IV) de Naples
2. Charlotte of Aragon (1480–1506), countess-peeress of Villefranche (1504–1506)

Civray

- county-peerage in 1498, 3 holders
1. Francis d'Angoulême (1494–1547), count-peer of Civray (1498–1515) and of Angoulême then king (Francis I) of France
2. Louise of Savoy (1476–1531), countess-peeress of Civray (1515–1531) and duchess-peeress of Anjou
3. Charles of France (1522–1545), count-peer of Civray (1540–1545) and duke-peer of Orléans

=== 16th century ===
Vendôme

- duchy-peerage in 1515, 7 holders
1. Charles IV de Bourbon (1489–1537), duke-peer of Vendôme (1515–1537)
2. Antoine de Bourbon (1518–1562), duke-peer of Vendôme (1537–1562) and count-peer of Foix
3. Henri de Bourbon (1553–1610), duke-peer of Vendôme (1562–1589) and count-peer of Foix, king (Henry III) of Navarre, king (Henry IV) of France
4. César de Bourbon-Vendôme (1594–1665), duke-peer of Vendôme (1598–1665)
5. Louis de Bourbon-Vendôme (1612–1669), duke-peer of Vendôme (1665–1669)
6. Louis-Joseph de Bourbon-Vendôme (1654–1712), duke-peer of Vendôme (1669–1712)
7. Philip de Bourbon-Vendôme (1655–1727), titular duke of Vendôme (1712–1727), grand-prieur

Châtellerault

- duchy-peerage in 1515, 6 holders
1. François de Bourbon (1492–1515), duke-peer of Châtellerault (1515)
2. Charles III de Bourbon (1490–1527), duke-peer of Châtellerault (1515–1527) and of Bourbon
3. Louise of Savoy (1476–1531), duchess-peeress of Châtellerault (1527–1530) and of Anjou
4. Louise de Bourbon (1482–1561), duchess-peeress of Châtellerault (1530–1532) and baroness-peeress of Beaujeu
5. Louis II de Bourbon-Montpensier (1513–1582), duke-peer of Châtellerault (1530–1532) then of Montpensier
6. Charles of France (1522–1545), duke-peer of Châtellerault (1540–1545) and of Orléans

Guise

- duchy-peerage in 1528, 12 holders
1. Claude I de Lorraine (1496–1550), duke-peer of Guise (1528–1550)
2. François de Lorraine (1519–1563), duke-peer of Guise (1550–1563)
3. Henri I de Lorraine (1549–1588), duke-peer of Guise (1563–1588) and count-peer of Eu
4. Charles de Lorraine (1571–1640), duke-peer of Guise (1588–1640) and count-peer of Eu
5. Henri II de Lorraine (1614–1664), duke-peer of Guise (1640–1641 and 1643–1664) and count-peer of Eu
6. Louis-Joseph de Lorraine (1650–1671), duke-peer of Guise (1664–1671) and count-peer of Eu
7. François-Joseph de Lorraine (1670–1675), duke-peer of Guise (1671–1675)
8. Henri-Jules de Bourbon-Condé (1643–1709), duke-peer of Guise (1704–1709)
9. Anne Henriette of Bavaria (1648–1723), duchess-peeress of Guise (1704–1723)
10. Louis III de Bourbon-Condé (1668–1710), duke-peer of Guise (1709–1710) and of Bourbon
11. Louis-Henri de Bourbon-Condé (1692–1740), duke-peer of Guise (1710–1740) and of Bourbon
12. Louis-Joseph de Bourbon-Condé (1736–1818), duke-peer of Guise (1740–1790) and of Bourbon

Montpensier

- duchy-peerage in 1539, 12 holders
1. Louise de Bourbon (1482–1562), duchess-peeress of Montpensier (1539–1562) and baroness-peeress of Beaujeu
2. Louis II de Bourbon-Montpensier (1513–1582), duke-peer of Montpensier (1539–1582)
3. François de Bourbon-Montpensier (1542–1592), duke-peer of Montpensier (1582–1592)
4. Henri de Bourbon-Montpensier (1573–1608), duke-peer of Montpensier (1592–1608)
5. Marie de Bourbon-Montpensier (1605–1627), duchess-peeress of Montpensier (1608–1627)
6. Gaston d'Orléans (1608–1660), duke-peer of Montpensier (1626–1627) and of Orléans
7. Anne-Marie-Louise d'Orléans (1627–1693), duchess-peeress of Montpensier (1627–1693) and countess-peeress of Eu
8. Philippe II d'Orléans (1640–1701), duke-peer of Montpensier (1695–1701) and of Orléans
9. Philippe III d'Orléans (1674–1723), duke-peer of Montpensier (1701–1723) and of Orléans
10. Louis III d'Orléans (1703–1752), duke-peer of Montpensier (1723–1752) and of Orléans
11. Louis-Philippe I d'Orléans (1725–1785), duke-peer of Montpensier (1752–1785) and of Orléans
12. Louis-Philippe-Joseph d'Orléans (1747–1793), duke-peer of Montpensier (1785–1790) and of Orléans

Aumale

- duchy-peerage in 1547, 10 holders
1. Francis de Lorraine (1519–1563), duke-peer of Aumale (1547–1550) then of Guise
2. Claude II de Lorraine (1526–1573), duke-peer of Aumale (1550–1573)
3. Charles de Lorraine (1556–1631), duke-peer of Aumale (1573–1631)
4. Henry I of Savoy (1572–1632), duke-peer of Aumale (1631–1632)
5. Anne de Lorraine (1600–1638), duchess-peeress of Aumale (1631–1638)
6. Louis of Savoy (1621–1641), duke-peer of Aumale (1638–1641)
7. Charles-Amédée of Savoy (1624–1652), duke-peer of Aumale (1643–1652)
8. Louis-Auguste I de Bourbon (1670–1736), duke-peer of Aumale (1695–1736) and count-peer of Eu
9. Louis-Charles de Bourbon (1701–1775), duke-peer of Aumale (1736–1775) and count-peer of Eu
10. Louis-Jean-Marie de Bourbon (1725–1793), duke-peer of Aumale (1776–1790) and count-peer of Eu

==== Mid-16th century ====
Montmorency

- duchy-peerage in 1551, 8 holders
1. Anne de Montmorency (1493–1567), duke-peer of Montmorency (1551–1567)
2. François de Montmorency (1530–1579), duke-peer of Montmorency (1567–1579)
3. Henri I de Montmorency (1534–1614), duke-peer of Montmorency (1579–1613)
4. Henri II de Montmorency (1595–1632), duke-peer of Montmorency (1613–1632)
5. Henri II de Bourbon-Condé (1588–1646), duke-peer of Montmorency (1633–1646)
6. Charlotte-Marguerite de Montmorency (1594–1650), duchess-peeress of Montmorency (1633–1650)
7. Louis II de Bourbon-Condé (1621–1686), duke-peer of Montmorency (1646–1686) and of Bourbon
8. Henri-Jules de Bourbon-Condé (1643–1709), duke-peer of Montmorency (1686–1688) then of Enghien

Albret

- duchy-peerage in 1556, 9 holders
1. Antoine de Bourbon (1518–1562), duke-peer of Albret (1556–1562) and of Vendôme
2. Jeanne d'Albret (1528–1573), duchess-peeress of Albret (1556–1572) and countess-peeress of Foix, queen (Joan III) of Navarre
3. Henry de Bourbon (1553–1610), duke-peer of Albret (1572–1589) and of Vendôme, king (Henry III) of Navarre, king (Henry IV) of France
4. Henri II de Bourbon-Condé (1588–1646), duke-peer of Albret (1641–1646) and of Montmorency
5. Louis II de Bourbon-Condé (1621–1686), duke-peer of Albret (1646–1651) and of Montmorency
6. Frédéric Maurice de La Tour d'Auvergne (1605–1652), duke-peer of Albret (1651–1652) and of Château-Thierry
7. Godefroy-Maurice de La Tour d'Auvergne (1641–1721), duke-peer of Albret (1652–1713) and of Château-Thierry
8. Emmanuel-Théodose de La Tour d'Auvergne (1668–1730), duke-peer of Albret (1713–1730) and of Château-Thierry
9. Charles Godefroy de La Tour d'Auvergne (1706–1771), duke-peer of Albret (1730–1771) and of Château-Thierry

Enghien

- duchy-peerage in 1566, 5 holders
1. Louis I de Bourbon-Condé (1530–1569), duke-peer of Enghien (1566–1569) and count-peer of Soissons
2. Henri-Jules de Bourbon-Condé (1643–1709), duke-peer of Enghien (1688–1709) and of Guise
3. Louis III de Bourbon-Condé (1668–1710), duke-peer of Enghien (1709–1710) and of Bourbon
4. Louis-Henri de Bourbon-Condé (1692–1740), duke-peer of Enghien (1710–1740) and of Bourbon
5. Louis-Joseph de Bourbon-Condé (1736–1818), duke-peer of Enghien (1740–1790) and of Bourbon

Perche

- county-peerage in 1566, 2 holders
1. Francis of France (1554–1584), count-peer of Perche (1566–1584) and duke-peer of Anjou
2. Louis of France (1755–1824), count-peer of Perche (1771–1790) and duke-peer of Anjou then king (Louis XVIII) of France

Graville

- duchy-peerage in 1567, 1 holder
1. Charles de Bourbon (1523–1590), duke-peer of Graville (1567–1590), cardinal

Penthièvre

- duchy-peerage in 1569, 8 holders
1. Sébastien de Luxembourg (+1569), duke-peer of Penthièvre (1569)
2. Marie de Luxembourg (1563–1623), duchess-peeress of Penthièvre (1569–1608)
3. Philippe-Emmanuel de Lorraine (1558–1602), duke-peer of Penthièvre (1575–1602)
4. Françoise de Lorraine (1592–1669), duchess-peeress of Penthièvre (1608–1669)
5. César de Bourbon-Vendôme (1594–1665), duke-peer of Penthièvre (1609–1665) and of Vendôme
6. Louis-Joseph de Bourbon-Vendôme (1654–1712), duke-peer of Penthièvre (1669–1687) et de Vendôme
7. Louis-Alexandre de Bourbon (1678–1737), duke-peer of Penthièvre (1697–1737)
8. Louis-Jean-Marie de Bourbon (1725–1793), duke-peer of Penthièvre (1737–1790) and of Aumale

Dreux

- county-peerage in 1569, 1 holder
1. Francis of France (1554–1584), count-peer of Dreux (1569–1584) and duke-peer of Anjou

Mercœur

- duchy-peerage in 1569, 9 holders
1. Nicolas de Lorraine (1524–1577), duke-peer of Mercœur (1569–1577)
2. Philippe-Emmanuel de Lorraine (1558–1602), duke-peer of Mercœur (1577–1602) and of Penthièvre
3. Françoise de Lorraine (1592–1669), duchess-peeress of Mercœur (1608–1649) and of Penthièvre
4. César de Bourbon-Vendôme (1594–1665), duke-peer of Mercœur (1609–1649) and of Vendôme
5. Louis de Bourbon-Vendôme (1612–1669), duke-peer of Mercœur (1649–1669) and of Vendôme
6. Louis-Joseph de Bourbon-Vendôme (1654–1712), duke-peer of Mercœur (1669–1712) and of Vendôme
7. Louis-Armand II de Bourbon-Conti (1696–1727), duke-peer of Mercœur (1723–1727)
8. Louis-Francis I de Bourbon-Conti (1717–1776), duke-peer of Mercœur (1727–1770)
9. Charles of France (1757–1836), duke-peer of Mercœur (1773–1778) and of Angoulême then king (Charles X) of France

Clermont-Tonnerre

- duchy-peerage in 1571, 3 holders
1. Henry de Clermont-Tonnerre (+1573), duke-peer of Clermont-Tonnerre (1571–1573)
2. Gaspard de Clermont-Tonnerre (1688–1781), duke-peer of Clermont-Tonnerre (1775–1781)
3. Charles-Henri de Clermont-Tonnerre (1720–1794), duke-peer of Clermont-Tonnerre (1781–1790)

Uzès

- duchy-peerage in 1572, 9 holders (the oldest peerage with a surviving heir)
1. Antoine de Crussol (1528–1573), duke-peer of Uzès (1572–1573)
2. Jacques II de Crussol (1540–1594), duke-peer of Uzès (1573–1594)
3. Emmanuel de Crussol (1578–1657), duke-peer of Uzès (1594–1657)
4. François de Crussol (1604–1680), duke-peer of Uzès (1657–1674)
5. Emmanuel II de Crussol (1642–1692), peer with the courtesy title of duke of Crussol (1674–1680) then duke-peer of Uzès (1680–1692)
6. Louis de Crussol (1673–1693), duke-peer of Uzès (1692–1693)
7. Jean-Charles de Crussol (1675–1739), duke-peer of Uzès (1693–1725)
8. Charles-Emmanuel de Crussol (1707–1762), peer with the courtesy title of duke of Crussol (1725–1739) then duke-peer of Uzès (1739–1753)
9. Francis-Emmanuel de Crussol (1728–1802), peer with the courtesy title of duke of Crussol (1753–1762) then duke-peer of Uzès (1762–1790)

Mayenne

- duchy-peerage in 1573, 7 holders
1. Charles de Lorraine (1554–1611), duke-peer of Mayenne (1573–1611)
2. Henri de Lorraine (1578–1621), duke-peer of Mayenne (1611–1621)
3. Francesco Gonzaga (1606–1622), duke-peer of Mayenne (1621–1622)
4. Charles II Gonzaga (1609–1631), duke-peer of Mayenne (1622–1626) and of Rethel
5. Ferdinand Gonzaga (1611–1631), duke-peer of Mayenne (1626–1631)
6. Charles III Gonzaga(1629–1665), duke-peer of Mayenne (1631–1654) and of Nevers
7. Jules Mazarin (1602–1661), duke-peer of Mayenne (1656–1661) and of Nevers, cardinal

Saint-Fargeau

- duchy-peerage in 1575, 6 holders
1. François de Bourbon-Montpensier (1542–1592), duke-peer of Saint-Fargeau (1575–1592) and of Montpensier
2. Renée d'Anjou-Mézières (1550–1597), duchess-peeress of Saint-Fargeau (1575–1597)
3. Henry de Bourbon-Montpensier (1573–1608), duke-peer of Saint-Fargeau (1592–1608) and of Montpensier
4. Marie de Bourbon-Montpensier (1605–1627), duchess-peeress of Saint-Fargeau (1608–1627) and of Montpensier
5. Gaston d'Orléans (1608–1660), duke-peer of Saint-Fargeau (1626–1627) and of Orléans
6. Anne-Marie-Louise d'Orléans (1627–1693), duchess-peeress of Saint-Fargeau (1627–1693) and of Montpensier

Joyeuse

- duchy-peerage in 1581, 11 holders
1. Anne de Joyeuse (1561–1587), duke-peer of Joyeuse (1581–1587)
2. François de Joyeuse (1562–1615), duke-peer of Joyeuse (1587–1590), cardinal
3. Antoine-Scipion de Joyeuse (1565–1592), duke-peer of Joyeuse (1590–1592)
4. Henry de Joyeuse (1567–1608), duke-peer of Joyeuse (1592–1608)
5. Henriette Catherine de Joyeuse (1585–1656), duchess-peeress of Joyeuse (1608–1647)
6. Charles de Lorraine (1571–1640), duke-peer of Joyeuse (1611–1640) and of Guise
7. Louis de Lorraine (1622–1654), duke-peer of Joyeuse (1647–1654) and count-peer of Eu
8. Louis-Joseph de Lorraine (1650–1671), duke-peer of Joyeuse (1654–1671) and of Guise
9. Francis-Joseph de Lorraine (1670–1675), duke-peer of Joyeuse (1671–1675) and of Guise
10. Marie de Lorraine (1615–1688), duchess-peeress of Joyeuse (1675–1688)
11. Louis de Melun (1694–1724), duke-peer of Joyeuse (1714–1724)

Piney-Luxembourg

- duchy-peerage in 1581, 10 holders
1. François de Luxembourg (+1613), duke-peer of Piney-Luxembourg (1581–1613)
2. Henri de Luxembourg (1582–1616), duke-peer of Piney-Luxembourg (1613–1616)
3. Marguerite-Charlotte de Luxembourg (1607–1680), duchess-peeress of Piney-Luxembourg (1616–1661)
4. Léon d'Albert (1582–1630), duke-peer of Piney-Luxembourg (1620–1630)
5. Henri-Léon d'Albert (1630–1697), duke-peer of Piney-Luxembourg (1630–1661)
6. Madeleine-Charlotte de Clermont-Tonnerre (1635–1701), duchess-peeress of Piney-Luxembourg (1661–1701)
7. François-Henri de Montmorency (1628–1695), duke-peer of Piney-Luxembourg (1661–1695)
8. Charles-Frédéric de Montmorency (1662–1726), duke-peer of Piney-Luxembourg (1695–1726)
9. Charles-Frédéric de Montmorency (1702–1764), duke-peer of Piney-Luxembourg (1726–1764)
10. Anne-Charles de Montmorency (1737–1803), duke-peer of Piney-Luxembourg (1769–1790)

Épernon

- duchy-peerage in 1581, 2 holders
1. Jean-Louis de Nogaret (1554–1642), duke-peer of Epernon (1581–1642)
2. Bernard de Nogaret (1592–1661), duke-peer of Epernon (1642–1661)

Elbeuf

- duchy-peerage in 1581, 6 holders
1. Charles de Lorraine (1566–1605), duke-peer of Elbeuf (1581–1605)
2. Charles de Lorraine (1596–1657), duke-peer of Elbeuf (1605–1657)
3. Charles de Lorraine (1620–1692), duke-peer of Elbeuf (1657–1692)
4. Henri de Lorraine (1661–1748), duke-peer of Elbeuf (1692–1748)
5. Emmanuel-Maurice de Lorraine (1677–1763), duke-peer of Elbeuf (1748–1763)
6. Charles-Eugène de Lorraine (1751–1825), duke-peer of Elbeuf (1763–1790)

Retz

- duchy-peerage in 1581, 4 holders
1. Albert de Gondi (1522–1602), duke-peer of Retz (1581–1602)
2. Claude Catherine de Clermont (1543–1604), duchess-peeress of Retz (1581–1604)
3. Henri de Gondi (1590–1659), duke-peer of Retz (1602–1633)
4. Pierre de Gondi (1602–1676), duke-peer of Retz (1633–1679)

Brienne

- duchy-peerage in 1587, 1 holder
1. Charles de Luxembourg (1572–1608), duke-peer of Brienne (1587–1608)

Hallwin

- duchy-peerage in 1587, 6 holders
1. Charles I d'Hallwin (1544–1594), duke-peer of Hallwin (1587–1594)
2. Anne Chabot (v.1544-1611), duchess-peeress of Hallwin (1587–1611)
3. Charles II d'Hallwin (1591–1598), duke-peer of Hallwin (1594–1598)
4. Anne d'Hallwin (v.1590-1641), duchess-peeress of Hallwin (1598–1641)
5. Henri de Nogaret (1591–1639), duke-peer of Hallwin (1606–1620) then of Candale
6. Charles de Schomberg (1601–1656), duke-peer of Hallwin (1621–1656)

Montbazon

- duchy-peerage in 1588, 9 holders
1. Louis de Rohan (1562–1608), duke-peer of Montbazon (1588–1589)
2. Hercule de Rohan (1568–1654), duke-peer of Montbazon (1594–1654)
3. Louis de Rohan (1598–1667), duke-peer of Montbazon (1654–1667)
4. Charles de Rohan (1633–1699), duke-peer of Montbazon (1667–1678)
5. Charles de Rohan (1655–1727), duke-peer of Montbazon (1678–1727)
6. Hercule-Mériadec de Rohan (1688–1757), duke-peer of Montbazon (1727–1757)
7. Jules-Hercule de Rohan (1726–1788), duke-peer of Montbazon (1757–1788)
8. Henri-Louis de Rohan (1745–1809), duke-peer of Montbazon (1788)
9. Charles-Alain de Rohan (1764–1836), duke-peer of Montbazon (1788–1790)

Ventadour

- duchy-peerage in 1589, 5 holders
1. Gilbert de Lévis (+1591), duke-peer of Ventadour (1589–1591)
2. Anne de Lévis (1569–1622), duke-peer of Ventadour (1591–1620)
3. Henry de Lévis (1596–1680), duke-peer of Ventadour (1620–1631)
4. Charles de Lévis (1600–1649), duke-peer of Ventadour (1631–1649)
5. Louis-Charles de Lévis (1647–1717), duke-peer of Ventadour (1649–1717)

Beaufort

- duchy-peerage in 1597, 5 holders
1. Gabrielle d'Estrées (1573–1599), duchess-peeress of Beaufort (1597–1598)
2. César de Bourbon-Vendôme (1594–1665), duke-peer of Beaufort (1598–1649) and of Vendôme
3. François de Bourbon-Vendôme (1616–1669), duke-peer of Beaufort (1649–1669)
4. Louis de Bourbon-Vendôme (1612–1669), duke-peer of Beaufort (1669) and of Vendôme
5. Louis-Joseph de Bourbon-Vendôme (1654–1712), duke-peer of Beaufort (1669–1688) and of Vendôme

Thouars

- duchy-peerage in 1595, 7 holders
1. Claude de La Trémoïlle (1566–1604), duke-peer of Thouars (1595–1604)
2. Henri de La Trémoille (1598–1674), duke-peer of Thouars (1604–1656)
3. Henri-Charles de La Trémoïlle (1620–1672), duke-peer of Thouars (1656–1672)
4. Charles de La Trémoïlle (1655–1709), duke-peer of Thouars (1672–1709)
5. Charles-Louis de La Trémoïlle (1683–1719), duke-peer of Thouars (1709–1719)
6. Charles-Armand de La Trémoïlle (1708–1741), duke-peer of Thouars (1719–1741)
7. Charles-Godefroy de La Trémoïlle (1737–1792), duke-peer of Thouars (1741–1790)

Biron

- duchy-peerage in 1598, 8 holders
1. Charles de Gontaut (1562–1602), duke-peer of Biron (1598–1602)
2. Charles-Armand de Gontaut (1663–1756), duke-peer of Biron (1723–1733)
3. Francis-Armand de Gontaut (1689–1736), duke-peer of Biron (1733–1736)
4. Antoine-Charles de Gontaut (1717–1739), duke-peer of Biron (1736–1739)
5. Jean-Louis de Gontaut (1692–1777), duke-peer of Biron (1739), abbé
6. Louis Antoine de Gontaut (1701–1788), duke-peer of Biron (1739–1788)
7. Charles-Antoine de Gontaut (1708–1798), duke-peer of Biron (1788)
8. Armand Louis de Gontaut (1747–1793), duke-peer of Biron (1788–1790)

Aiguillon

- duchy-peerage in 1599, 6 holders
1. Henry de Lorraine (1578–1621), duke-peer of Aiguillon (1599–1621) and of Mayenne
2. Marie-Madeleine de Vignerot du Plesssis (1604–1675), duchess-peeress of Aiguillon (1638–1675)
3. Marie-Thérèse de Vignerot du Plessis (1636–1704), duchess-peeress of Aiguillon (1675–1704)
4. Armand Louis de Vignerot du Plessis (1683–1750), duke-peer of Aiguillon (1731–1740)
5. Emmanuel Armand de Vignerot du Plessis (1720–1788), peer with the courtesy title of duke of Agenois (1740–1750) then duke-peer of Aiguillon (1750–1788)
6. Armand Désiré de Vignerot du Plessis(1761–1800), duke-peer of Aiguillon (1788–1790)

=== 17th century ===
Rohan

- duchy-peerage in 1603, 6 holders
1. Henri de Rohan (1579–1638), duke-peer of Rohan (1603–1638)
2. Henri Chabot (1615–1655), duke-peer of Rohan (1648–1655)
3. Marguerite de Rohan (1617–1684), duchess-peeress of Rohan (1648–1678)
4. Louis de Rohan-Chabot (1652–1727), duke-peer of Rohan (1678–1708)
5. Louis de Rohan-Chabot (1679–1738), duke-peer of Rohan (1708–1738)
6. Louis de Rohan-Chabot (1710–1791), duke-peer of Rohan (1738–1790)

Sully

- duchy-peerage in 1606, 8 holders
1. Maximilian de Béthune (1560–1641), duke-peer of Sully (1606–1641)
2. Maximilien-François de Béthune (1615–1661), duke-peer of Sully (1641–1661)
3. Maximilien-Pierre de Béthune (1640–1694), duke-peer of Sully (1661–1694)
4. Maximilien-Nicolas de Béthune (1664–1712), duke-peer of Sully (1694–1712)
5. Maximilien-Henri de Béthune (1669–1729), duke-peer of Sully (1712–1729)
6. Louis-Maximilian de Béthune (1685–1761), duke-peer of Sully (1729–1761)
7. Maximilien-Antoine de Béthune (1730–1786), duke-peer of Sully (1761–1786)
8. Maximilien-Gabriel de Béthune (1756–1800), duke-peer of Sully (1786–1790)

Fronsac

- duchy-peerage in 1608, 9 holders
1. François d'Orléans-Dunois (1570–1631), duke-peer of Fronsac (1608–1631)
2. Armand-Jean du Plessis (1585–1642), duke-peer of Fronsac (1634–1642), cardinal de Richelieu
3. Jean Armand de Maillé (1619–1646), duke-peer of Fronsac (1642–1646)
4. Claire-Clémence de Maillé (1628–1694), duchess-peeress of Fronsac (1646–1674)
5. Louis II de Bourbon-Condé (1621–1686), duke-peer of Fronsac (1646–1674) and of Bourbon
6. Armand Jean de Vignerot du Plessis (1629–1718), duke-peer of Fronsac (1674–1711)
7. Louis-Armand de Vignerot du Plessis (1696–1788), duke-peer of Fronsac (1711–1764)
8. Louis-Antoine de Vignerot du Plessis (1736–1791), duke-peer of Fronsac (1764–1788) then of Richelieu
9. Armand-Emmanuel de Vignerot du Plessis (1766–1822), duke-peer of Fronsac (1788–1790)

Damville

- duchy-peerage in 1610, 4 holders
1. Charles de Montmorency (1537–1612), duke-peer of Damville (1610–1612)
2. Henri II de Montmorency (1595–1632), duke-peer of Damville (1612–1632) and of Montmorency
3. François-Christophe de Lévis (1603–1661), duke-peer of Damville (1648–1661)
4. Louis-Alexandre de Bourbon (1678–1737), duke-peer of Damville (1694–1719) and of Penthièvre

Brissac

- duchy-peerage in 1611, 9 holders
1. Charles de Cossé (1550–1621), duke-peer of Brissac (1611–1621)
2. François de Cossé (1581–1651), duke-peer of Brissac (1621–1644)
3. Louis de Cossé (1625–1661), duke-peer of Brissac (1644–1661)
4. Henri-Albert de Cossé (1645–1698), duke-peer of Brissac (1661–1698)
5. Artus-Timoléon de Cossé (1668–1703), duke-peer of Brissac (1698–1702)
6. Charles-Timoléon de Cossé (1693–1732), duke-peer of Brissac (1702–1732)
7. Jean-Paul-Timoléon de Cossé (1698–1780), duke-peer of Brissac (1732–1756)
8. Louis-Joseph de Cossé (1733–1759), peer with the courtesy title of duke of Cossé (1756–1759)
9. Louis-Hercule de Cossé (1734–1792), peer with the courtesy title of duke of Cossé (1760–1780) then duke-peer of Brissac (1780–1790)

Grancey

- duchy-peerage in 1611, 1 holder
1. Guillaume de Hautemer (1538–1613), duke-peer of Grancey (1611–1613)

Lesdiguières

- duchy-peerage in 1611, 6 holders
1. François de Bonne (1543–1626), duke-peer of Lesdiguières (1611–1626)
2. Charles de Blanchefort (1578–1638), duke-peer of Lesdiguières (1626–1638)
3. François de Bonne de Blanchefort (1596–1677), duke-peer of Lesdiguières (1638–1675)
4. François-Emmanuel de Bonne de Blanchefort (1645–1681), peer with the courtesy title of duke of Sault (1675–1677) then duke-peer of Lesdiguières (1677–1681)
5. Jean-François-Paul de Bonne de Blanchefort (1678–1703), duke-peer of Lesdiguières (1681–1703)
6. Alphonse de Bonne de Blanchefort (1626–1711), duke-peer of Lesdiguières (1702–1711)

Chevreuse

- duchy-peerage in 1612, 1 holder
1. Claude de Lorraine (1578–1657), duke-peer of Chevreuse (1612–1657)

Châteauroux

- duchy-peerage in 1616, 6 holders
1. Henri II de Bourbon-Condé (1588–1646), duke-peer of Châteauroux (1616–1646) and of Albret
2. Louis II de Bourbon-Condé (1621–1686), duke-peer of Châteauroux (1646–1686) and of Bourbon
3. Henri-Jules de Bourbon-Condé (1643–1709), duke-peer of Châteauroux (1686–1709) and of Guise
4. Louis de Bourbon-Condé (1709–1771), duke-peer of Châteauroux (1710–1736)
5. Anne-Marie de Mailly (1717–1744), duchess-peeress of Châteauroux (1743–1744)
6. Charles of France (1757–1836), duke-peer of Châteauroux (1776–1790) and of Angoulême then king (Charles X) of France

Luynes

- duchy-peerage in 1619, 6 holders
1. Charles d'Albert (1577–1621), duke-peer of Luynes (1619–1621)
2. Louis-Charles d'Albert (1620–1690), duke-peer of Luynes (1621–1685)
3. Charles-Honoré d'Albert (1646–1712), peer with the courtesy title of duke of Chevreuse (1685–1690) then duke-peer of Luynes (1690–1712)
4. Charles-Philippe d'Albert (1695–1758), duke-peer of Luynes (1712–1758)
5. Charles-Louis d'Albert (1717–1771), duke-peer of Luynes (1758–1771)
6. Louis-Charles d'Albert (1748–1807), duke-peer of Luynes (1771–1790)

Bellegarde

- duchy-peerage in 1619, 1 holder
1. Roger de Saint-Lary de Termes (1562–1646), duke-peer of Bellegarde (1619–1646)

Candale

- duchy-peerage in 1621, 1 holder
1. Henry de Nogaret (1591–1639), duke-peer of Candale (1621–1639)

Chaulnes

- duchy-peerage in 1621, 7 holders
1. Honoré d'Albert d'Ailly (1581–1649), duke-peer of Chaulnes (1621–1649)
2. Henri-Louis d'Albert d'Ailly (1621–1653), duke-peer of Chaulnes (1649–1653)
3. Charles d'Albert d'Ailly (1625–1698), duke-peer of Chaulnes (1653–1698)
4. Louis-Auguste d'Albert d'Ailly (1676–1744), duke-peer of Chaulnes (1711–1729)
5. Charles-François d'Albert d'Ailly (1707–1731), peer with the courtesy title of duke of Picquigny (1729–1731)
6. Michel Ferdinand d'Albert d'Ailly (1714–1769), peer with the courtesy title of duke of Picquigny (1731–1744) then duke-peer of Chaulnes (1744–1769)
7. Joseph Louis d'Albert d'Ailly (1741–1792), duke-peer of Chaulnes (1769–1790)

La Roche-Guyon

- duchy-peerage in 1621, 2 holders
1. François de Silly (1586–1628), duke-peer of La Roche-Guyon (1621–1628)
2. Roger du Plessis-Liancourt (1598–1674), duke-peer of La Roche-Guyon (1643–1674)

La Rochefoucauld

- duchy-peerage in 1622, 6 holders
1. François V de La Rochefoucauld (1588–1650), duke-peer of La Rochefoucauld (1622–1650)
2. François VI de La Rochefoucauld (1613–1680), duke-peer of La Rochefoucauld (1650–1671)
3. François VII de La Rochefoucauld (1634–1714), duke-peer of La Rochefoucauld (1671–1713)
4. François VIII de La Rochefoucauld (1663–1728), duke-peer of La Rochefoucauld (1713–1728)
5. Alexandre de La Rochefoucauld (1690–1762), duke-peer of La Rochefoucauld (1728–1762)
6. Louis-Alexandre de La Rochefoucauld (1743–1792), duke-peer of La Rochefoucauld (1762–1790)

La Valette

- duchy-peerage in 1622, 2 holders
1. Bernard de Nogaret (1592–1661), duke-peer of La Valette (1622–1649 and 1658–1661) and of Epernon
2. Louis-Charles de Nogaret (1627–1658), duke-peer of La Valette (1649–1658)

Frontenay

- duchy-peerage in 1626, 1 holder
1. Benjamin de Rohan (1585–1642), duke-peer of Frontenay (1626–1642)

Richelieu

- duchy-peerage in 1631, 4 holders
1. Armand-Jean du Plessis (1585–1642), duke-peer of Richelieu (1631–1642) and of Fronsac, cardinal
2. Armand-Jean de Vignerot du Plessis (1629–1718), duke-peer of Richelieu (1642–1715) and of Fronsac
3. Louis-Armand de Vignerot du Plessis (1696–1788), duke-peer of Richelieu (1715–1788) and of Fronsac
4. Louis-Antoine de Vignerot du Plessis (1736–1791), duke-peer of Richelieu (1788–1790)

Puylaurens

- duchy-peerage in 1634, 1 holder
1. Antoine de L'Age (1602–1635), duke-peer of Puylaurens (1634–1635)

Saint-Simon

- duchy-peerage in 1635, 4 holders
1. Claude de Rouvroy (1607–1693), duke-peer of Saint-Simon (1635–1693)
2. Louis de Rouvroy (1675–1755), duke-peer of Saint-Simon (1693–1723 and 1754–1755)
3. Jacques-Louis de Rouvroy (1698–1746), peer with the courtesy title of duke of Ruffec (1723–1746)
4. Armand-Jean de Rouvroy (1699–1754), peer with the courtesy title of duke of Ruffec (1746–1754)

La Force

- duchy-peerage in 1637, 7 holders
1. Jacques-Nompar de Caumont (1558–1652), duke-peer of La Force (1637–1652)
2. Armand-Nompar de Caumont (1580–1675), duke-peer of La Force (1652–1675)
3. Henri-Nompar de Caumont (1582–1678), duke-peer of La Force (1675–1678)
4. Jacques-Nompar de Caumont (1632–1699), duke-peer of La Force (1678–1698)
5. Henri-Jacques de Caumont (1675–1726), peer with the courtesy title of duke of Caumont (1698–1699) then duke-peer of La Force (1699–1726)
6. Armand-Nompar de Caumont (1679–1764), duke-peer of La Force (1726–1730 and 1755–1764)
7. Jacques-Nompar de Caumont (1714–1755), peer with the courtesy title of duke of Caumont (1730–1755)

Valentinois

- duchy-peerage in 1642, 6 holders
1. Honoré II, Prince of Monaco (1597–1662), duke-peer of Valentinois (1642–1659)
2. Louis I, Prince of Monaco (1642–1701), duke-peer of Valentinois (1659–1701)
3. Antoine I, Prince of Monaco (1661–1731), duke-peer of Valentinois (1701–1715)
4. Jacques Goyon-Matignon (1689–1751), duke-peer of Valentinois (1715–1751)
5. Honoré III, Prince of Monaco (1720–1795), duke-peer of Valentinois (1751–1777)
6. Honoré IV, Prince of Monaco (1759–1818), duke-peer of Valentinois (1777–1790)

Gramont

- duchy-peerage in 1643, 7 holders
1. Antoine II de Gramont (1572–1644), duke-peer of Gramont (1643–1644)
2. Antoine III de Gramont (1604–1678), duke-peer of Gramont (1648–1678)
3. Antoine IV Charles de Gramont (1640–1720) duke-peer of Gramont (1678–1695)
4. Antoine V de Gramont (1672–1725), peer with the courtesy title of duke of Guiche (1695–1713), duke of Gramont in 1720
5. Antoine-Armand de Gramont (1688–1741), peer with the courtesy titles of duke of Louvigny (1713–1720) then of Guiche (1720–1725) then duke-peer of Gramont (1725–1741)
6. Louis-Antoine de Gramont (1689–1745), duke-peer of Gramont (1741–1745)
7. Antoine-Antonin de Gramont (1722–1801), duke-peer of Gramont (1745–1790)

Coligny

- duchy-peerage in 1643, 2 holders
1. Gaspard III de Coligny (1584–1646), duke-peer of Coligny (1643–1646)
2. Gaspard IV de Coligny (1620–1649), duke-peer of Coligny (1648–1649)

Châtillon/Loing

- duchy-peerage in 1646, 1 holder
1. Gaspard IV de Coligny (1620–1649), duke-peer of Châtillon (1646–1648) then of Coligny

Estrées

- duchy-peerage in 1648, 5 holders
1. François-Annibal I d'Estrées (1573–1670), duke-peer of Estrées (1648–1670)
2. François-Annibal II d'Estrées (1623–1687), duke-peer of Estrées (1670–1687)
3. François-Annibal III d'Estrées (1648–1698), duke-peer of Estrées (1687–1698)
4. Louis-Armand d'Estrées (1682–1723), duke-peer of Estrées (1698–1723)
5. Victor-Marie d'Estrées (1660–1737), duke-peer of Estrées (1723–1737)

Tresmes/Gesvres

- duchy-peerage in 1648, 6 holders
1. René Potier (1579–1670), duke-peer of Tresmes (1648–1669)
2. Léon Potier (1620–1704), duke-peer of Tresmes then of Gesvres (1669–1703)
3. François-Bernard Potier (1655–1739), duke-peer of Gesvres (1703–1722)
4. François-Joachim Potier (1692–1757), duke-peer of Gesvres (1722–1757)
5. Léon-Louis Potier (1695–1774), duke-peer of Gesvres (1757–1774)
6. Louis-Joachim Potier (1733–1794), duke-peer of Gesvres (1774–1790)

==== Mid-17th century ====
Arpajon

- duchy-peerage in 1650, 1 holder
1. Louis d'Arpajon (1590–1679), duke-peer of Arpajon (1650–1679)

Lavedan

- duchy-peerage in 1650, 2 holders
1. Philippe de Montaut-Navailles (1579–1654), duke-peer of Lavedan (1650–1654)
2. Philippe de Montaut-Navailles (1619–1684), duke-peer of Lavedan (1654–1660) then of Montaut

Mortemart

- duchy-peerage in 1650, 10 holders
1. Gabriel de Rochechouart (1600–1675), duke-peer of Mortemart (1650–1674)
2. Louis-Victor de Rochechouart (1636–1688), duke-peer of Mortemart (1674–1679)
3. Louis de Rochechouart (1663–1688), duke-peer of Mortemart (1679–1688)
4. Louis de Rochechouart (1681–1746), duke-peer of Mortemart (1688–1730 and 1743–1746)
5. Paul-Louis de Rochechouart (1711–1731), duke-peer of Mortemart (1730–1731)
6. Charles-Auguste de Rochechouart (1714–1743), duke-peer of Mortemart (1732–1743)
7. Louis-François de Rochechouart (1739–1743), duke-peer of Mortemart (1743)
8. Jean-Baptiste de Rochechouart (1682–1757), duke-peer of Mortemart (1746–1753)
9. Jean-Victor de Rochechouart (1712–1771), peer with the courtesy title of duke of Rochechouart (1753–1757) then duke-peer of Mortemart (1757–1771)
10. Victurnien-Jean-Baptiste de Rochechouart (1752–1812), duke-peer of Mortemart (1771–1790)

Noirmoutier

- duchy-peerage in 1650, 1 holder
1. François-Marie de L'Hospital (1618–1679), duke-peer of Vitry (1650–1679)

La Vieuville

- duchy-peerage in 1651, 2 holders
1. Charles de La Vieuville (1582–1653), duke-peer of La Vieuville (1651–1653)
2. Charles de La Vieuville (1619–1689), duke-peer of La Vieuville (1653–1689)

Rosnay

- duchy-peerage in 1651, 1 holder
1. François de L'Hospital (1583–1660), duke-peer of Rosnay (1651–1660)

Villemor

- duchy-peerage in 1651, 1 holder
1. Pierre Séguier (1588–1672), duke-peer of Villemor (1651–1663)

Villeroy

- duchy-peerage in 1651, 5 holders
1. Nicolas de Neufville (1598–1685), duke-peer of Villeroy (1651–1675)
2. François de Neufville (1644–1730), duke-peer of Villeroy (1675–1694)
3. Nicolas-Louis de Neufville (1663–1734), duke-peer of Villeroy (1694–1722)
4. Louis-François de Neufville (1695–1766), peer with the courtesy title of duke of Retz (1722–1734) then duke-peer of Villeroy (1734–1766)
5. Gabriel-Louis de Neufville (1731–1794), duke-peer of Villeroy (1766–1790)

Bournonville

- duchy-peerage in 1652, 1 holder
1. Ambroise-François de Bournonville (1619–1693), duke-peer of Bournonville (1652–1693)

Cardone

- duchy-peerage in 1652, 1 holder
1. Philippe de La Mothe-Houdancourt (1605–1657), duke-peer of Cardone (1652–1653) then of Fayel

Créquy

- duchy-peerage in 1652, 1 holder
1. Charles de Bonne de Blanchefort (1623–1687), duke-peer of Créquy (1652–1687)

Orval

- duchy-peerage in 1652, 1 holder
1. François de Béthune (1599–1678), duke-peer of Orval (1652–1678)

Roquelaure

- duchy-peerage in 1652, 2 holders
1. Gaston de Roquelaure (1614–1683), duke-peer of Roquelaure (1652–1683)
2. Antoine Gaston de Roquelaure (1656–1738), duke-peer of Roquelaure (1683–1738)

Verneuil

- duchy-peerage in 1652, 1 holder
1. Henri de Bourbon (1601–1682), duke-peer of Verneuil (1652–1682)

Villars-Brancas

- duchy-peerage in 1652, 5 holders
1. Georges de Brancas (1568–1657), duke-peer of Villars-Brancas (1652–1657)
2. Louis-François de Brancas (+1679), duke-peer of Villars-Brancas (1657–1679)
3. Louis de Brancas (1663–1739), duke-peer of Villars-Brancas (1679–1709)
4. Louis-Antoine de Brancas (1682–1760), duke-peer of Villars-Brancas (1709–1731)
5. Louis de Brancas (1714–1794), peer with the courtesy title of duke of Lauraguais (1731–1760) then duke-peer of Villars-Brancas (1760–1790)

Fayel (Le Fayel)

- duchy-peerage in 1653, 1 holder
1. Philippe de La Mothe-Houdancourt (1605–1657), duke-peer of Fayel (1653–1657)

La Guiche

- duchy-peerage in 1653, 2 holders
1. Louis-Emmanuel d'Angoulême (1596–1653), duke-peer of La Guiche (1653)
2. Louis de Lorraine (1622–1654), duke-peer of La Guiche (1653–1654) and of Joyeuse

Montaut

- duchy-peerage in 1660, 1 holder
1. Philippe de Montaut-Navailles (1619–1684), duke-peer of Montaut (1660–1684)

Randan

- duchy-peerage in 1661, 3 holders
1. Marie-Catherine de La Rochefoucauld (1588–1677), duchess-peeress of Randan (1661–1662)
2. Jean-Baptiste-Gaston de Foix (1638–1665), duke-peer of Randan (1662–1665)
3. Henri-François de Foix (1639–1714), duke-peer of Randan (1666–1714)

La Meilleraye

- duchy-peerage in 1663, 4 holders
1. Charles de La Porte (1602–1664), duke-peer of La Meilleraye (1663–1664)
2. Armand-Charles de La Porte (1632–1713), duke-peer of La Meilleraye (1664–1700) and of Rethel-Mazarin
3. Paul-Jules de La Porte-Mazarin (1666–1731), duke-peer of La Meilleraye (1700–1729) and of Rethel-Mazarin
4. Guy-Paul-Jules de La Porte-Mazarin (1701–1738), duke-peer of La Meillaraye (1729–1738) and of Rethel-Mazarin

Saint-Aignan

- duchy-peerage in 1663, 7 holders
1. François-Honorat de Beauvillier (1607–1687), duke-peer of Saint-Aignan (1663–1679)
2. Paul de Beauvillier (1648–1714), peer with the courtesy title of duke of Beauvillier (1679–1687) then duke-peer of Saint-Aignan (1679–1706)
3. Paul-Hippolyte de Beauvillier (1684–1776), duke-peer of Saint-Aignan (1706–1738)
4. Paul-François de Beauvillier (1710–1742), peer with the courtesy title of duke of Beauvillier (1738–1742)
5. Paul-Louis de Beauvillier (1711–1757), peer with the courtesy title of duke of Beauvillier (1742–1757)
6. Paul-Etienne de Beauvillier (1745–1771), peer with the courtesy title of duke of Beauvillier (1757–1771)
7. Paul de Beauvillier (1766–1794), peer with the courtesy title of duke of Beauvillier (1771–1776) then duke-peer of Saint-Aignan (1776–1790)

Noailles

- duchy-peerage in 1663, 4 holders
1. Anne de Noailles (1615–1678), duke-peer of Noailles (1663–1677)
2. Anne Jules de Noailles (1650–1708), peer with the courtesy title of duke of Ayen (1677–1678) then duke-peer of Noailles (1678–1704)
3. Adrien Maurice de Noailles (1678–1766), duke-peer of Noailles (1704–1766)
4. Louis de Noailles (1713–1793), duke-peer of Noailles (1766–1790)

Coislin

- duchy-peerage in 1663, 3 holders
1. Armand du Cambout (1635–1702), duke-peer of Coislin (1663–1702)
2. Pierre du Cambout (1663–1710), duke-peer of Coislin (1702–1710)
3. Henri-Charles du Cambout (1664–1732), duke-peer of Coislin (1710–1732)

Montausier

- duchy-peerage in 1664, 1 holder
1. Charles de Sainte-Maure (1610–1690), duke-peer of Montausier (1664–1690)

Choiseul

- duchy-peerage in 1665, 5 holders
1. César de Choiseul (1598–1675), duke-peer of Choiseul (1665–1675)
2. César-Auguste de Choiseul (1664–1684), duke-peer of Choiseul (1675–1684)
3. César-Auguste de Choiseul (1637–1705), duke-peer of Choiseul (1684–1705)
4. Étienne-François de Choiseul (1719–1785), duke-peer of Choiseul (1758–1785)
5. Claude-Gabriel de Choiseul (1760–1838), duke-peer of Choiseul (1787–1790)

Aumont

- duchy-peerage in 1665, 6 holders
1. Antoine d'Aumont de Rochebaron (1601–1669), duke-peer of Aumont (1665–1669)
2. Louis-Victor d'Aumont de Rochebaron (1632–1704), duke-peer of Aumont (1669–1704)
3. Louis d'Aumont de Rochebaron (1666–1723), duke-peer of Aumont (1704–1722)
4. Louis-Marie d'Aumont de Rochebaron (1691–1723), peer with the courtesy title of duke of Villequier (1722–1723) then duke-peer of Aumont (1723)
5. Louis-Augustin d'Aumont de Rochebaron (1709–1782), duke-peer of Aumont (1723–1782)
6. Louis-Guy d'Aumont de Rochebaron (1732–1799), duke-peer of Aumont (1782–1790)

La Ferté-Senneterre (Saint-Nectaire)

- duchy-peerage in 1665, 2 holders
1. Henri de Senneterre (v.1600-1681), duke-peer of La Ferté-Senneterre (1665–1678)
2. Henri-François de Senneterre (1657–1703), duke-peer of La Ferté-Senneterre (1678–1703)

La Vallière

- duchy-peerage in 1667, 5 holders
1. Louise-Françoise de La Baume Le Blanc (1644–1710), duchess-peeress of La Vallière (1667–1675)
2. Marie Anne de Bourbon (1666–1739), duchess-peeress of La Vallière (1675–1723)
3. Louis Armand I de Bourbon-Conti (1661–1685), duke-peer of La Vallière (1680–1685)
4. Charles-François de La Baume Le Blanc (1670–1739), duke-peer of La Vallière (1723–1732)
5. Louis César de La Baume Le Blanc (1708–1780), duke-peer of La Vallière (1732–1780)

Duras

- duchy-peerage in 1668, 3 holders
1. Jacques-Henri de Durfort (1625–1704), duke-peer of Duras (1668–1704)
2. Emmanuel-Félicité de Durfort (1715–1789), peer with the courtesy title of duke of Durfort (1755–1770) then duke-peer of Duras (1770–1789)
3. Emmanuel-Céleste de Durfort (1741–1800), duke-peer of Duras (1789–1790)

Chârost

- duchy-peerage in 1672, 6 holders
1. Louis de Béthune (1605–1681), duke-peer of Chârost (1672–1681)
2. Louis-Armand de Béthune (1641–1717), duke-peer of Chârost (1681–1695)
3. Armand de Béthune (1662–1747), duke-peer of Chârost (1695–1724)
4. Paul-François de Béthune (1682–1759), duke-peer of Chârost (1724–1737)
5. François-Joseph de Béthune (1719–1739), peer with the courtesy title of duke of Ancenis (1737–1739)
6. Armand-Joseph de Béthune (1738–1800), peer with the courtesy title of duke of Ancenis (1739–1759) then duke-peer of Chârost (1759–1790)

Saint-Cloud

- duchy-peerage in 1674 for the Archbishop of Paris, 6 holders
1. François de Harlay de Champvallon (1625–1695), duke-peer of Saint-Cloud (1674–1695), archbishop of Paris
2. Louis-Antoine de Noailles (1651–1729), duke-peer of Saint-Cloud (1695–1729), archbishop of Paris
3. Charles-Gaspard-Guillaume de Vintimille du Luc (1655–1746), duke-peer of Saint-Cloud (1729–1746), archbishop of Paris
4. Jacques Bonne-Gigault de Bellefonds (1698–1746), duke-peer of Saint-Cloud (1746), archbishop of Paris
5. Christophe de Beaumont du Repaire (1703–1781), duke-peer of Saint-Cloud (1746–1781), archbishop of Paris
6. Antoine-Eléonore-Léon Le Clerc de Juigné (1728–1811), duke-peer of Saint-Cloud (1781–1790), archbishop of Paris

Le Lude

- duchy-peerage in 1675, 1 holder
1. Henry de Daillon (1623–1685), duke-peer of Le Lude (1675–1685)

Aubigny

- duchy-peerage in 1684, 3 holders
1. Charles Lennox, 1st Duke of Richmond (1672–1723), duke-peer of Aubigny (1684–1723)
2. Louise-Renée de Penancoët de Kéroualle (1649–1734), duchess-peeress of Aubigny (1684–1734)
3. Charles Lennox, 3rd Duke of Richmond (1734–1806), duke-peer of Aubigny (1777–1790)

=== 18th century ===
Châteauvillain

- duchy-peerage in 1703, 2 holders
1. Louis-Alexandre de Bourbon (1678–1737), duke-peer of Châteauvilllain (1703–1737) and of Penthièvre
2. Louis-Jean-Marie de Bourbon (1725–1793), duke-peer of Châteauvillain (1737–1790) and of Penthièvre

Boufflers

- duchy-peerage in 1708, 3 holders
1. Louis-François de Boufflers (1644–1711), duke-peer of Boufflers (1708–1711)
2. Joseph Marie de Boufflers (1706–1747), duke-peer of Boufflers (1711–1747)
3. Charles-Joseph de Boufflers (1731–1751), duke-peer of Boufflers (1747–1751)

Villars

- duchy-peerage in 1709, 2 holders
1. Claude Louis Hector de Villars (1653–1734), duke-peer of Villars (1709–1734)
2. Honoré Armand de Villars (1702–1770), duke-peer of Villars (1734–1770)

Harcourt

- duchy-peerage in 1709, 5 holders
1. Henri d'Harcourt (1654–1718), duke-peer of Harcourt (1709–1718)
2. François d'Harcourt (1689–1750), duke-peer of Harcourt (1718–1750)
3. Louis-Abraham d'Harcourt (1694–1750), duke-peer of Harcourt (1750)
4. Anne Pierre d'Harcourt (1701–1783), duke-peer of Harcourt (1750–1783)
5. François-Henri d'Harcourt (1726–1802), duke-peer of Harcourt (1783–1790)

Fitz-James

- duchy-peerage in 1710, 5 holders
1. James Stuart-Fitz-James (1670–1734), duke-peer of Fitz-James (1710–1720 and 1721–1734)
2. James Fitz-James (1702–1721), duke-peer of Fitz-James (1720–1721)
3. Francis Fitz-James (1709–1764), duke-peer of Fitz-James (1734–1736)
4. Charles Fitz-James (1712–1787), duke-peer of Fitz-James (1736–1769)
5. James Fitz-James (1743–1805), duke-peer of Fitz-James (1769–1790)

Antin

- duchy-peerage in 1711, 3 holders
1. Louis-Antoine de Pardaillan (1707–1743), duke-peer of Antin (1711–1722)
2. Louis de Pardaillan (1707–1743), peer with the courtesy title of duke of Epernon (1722–1743) then duke-peer of Antin (1743)
3. Louis de Pardaillan (1727–1757), duke-peer of Antin (1743–1757)

Rambouillet

- duchy-peerage in 1711, 2 holders
1. Louis-Alexandre de Bourbon (1678–1737), duke-peer of Rambouillet (1711–1737) and of Penthièvre
2. Louis-Jean-Marie de Bourbon (1725–1793), duke-peer of Rambouillet (1737–1783) and of Penthièvre

Rohan-Rohan

- duchy-peerage in 1714, 2 holders
1. Hercule-Mériadec de Rohan-Soubise (1669–1749), duke-peer of Rohan-Rohan (1714–1749)
2. Charles de Rohan-Soubise (1715–1787), duke-peer of Rohan-Rohan (1749–1787)

Hostun

- duchy-peerage in 1715, 2 holders
1. Marie-Joseph d'Hostun (1684–1755), duke-peer of Hostun (1715–1732 and 1739–1755)
2. Louis-Charles d'Hostun (1716–1739), duke-peer of Hostun (1732–1739)

Lévis

- duchy-peerage in 1723, 1 holder
1. Charles-Eugène de Lévis-Charlus (1669–1734), duke-peer of Lévis (1723–1734)

Châtillon

- duchy-peerage in 1736, 2 holders
1. Alexis de Châtillon (1690–1754), duke-peer of Châtillon (1736–1754)
2. Louis-Gaucher de Châtillon (1737–1762), duke-peer of Châtillon (1754–1762)

Fleury

- duchy-peerage in 1736, 3 holders
1. Jean-Hercule de Rosset (1683–1748), duke-peer of Fleury (1736)
2. André-Hercule de Rosset (1715–1788), duke-peer of Fleury (1736–1788)
3. André-Hercule de Rosset (1767–1810), duke-peer of Fleury (1788–1790)

Gisors

- duchy-peerage in 1748, 2 holders
1. Charles-Louis Fouquet de Belle-Isle (1684–1761), duke-peer of Gisors (1748–1761)
2. Louis-Jean-Marie de Bourbon (1725–1793), duke-peer of Gisors (1776–1790)

Taillebourg

- duchy-peerage in 1749, 1 holder
1. Louis-Stanislas de La Trémoïlle (1734–1749), duke-peer of Taillebourg (1749)

==== Mid-18th century ====
La Vauguyon

- duchy-peerage in 1758, 2 holders
1. Antoine de Quélen de Stuer de Caussade (1706–1772), duke-peer of La Vauguyon (1758–1772)
2. Paul-François de Quélen de Stuer de Caussade (1746–1828), duke-peer of La Vauguyon (1772–1790)

Praslin

- duchy-peerage in 1762, 2 holders
1. César-Gabriel de Choiseul-Praslin (1712–1785), duke-peer of Praslin (1762–1785)
2. Renaud César de Choiseul-Praslin (1735–1791), duke-peer of Praslin (1785–1790)

Brunoy

- duchy-peerage in 1777, 2 holders
1. Louis of France (1755–1824), duke-peer of Brunoy (1777–1790) and of Anjou then king (Louis XVIII) of France
2. Marie-Josèphe of Savoy (1753–1810), duchess-peeress of Brunoy (1777–1790)

Louvois

- duchy-peerage in 1777, 2 holders
1. Sophie of France (1734–1782), duchess-peeress of Louvois (1777–1782)
2. Marie-Adélaïde of France (1732–1800), duchess-peeress of Louvois (1777–1800)

Amboise

- duchy-peerage in 1787, 1 holder
1. Louis-Jean-Marie de Bourbon (1725–1793), duke-peer of Amboise (1787–1790) and of Penthièvre

Coigny

- duchy-peerage in 1787, 1 holder
1. François-Henri de Franquetot de Coigny (1737–1821), duke-peer of Coigny (1787–1790)

=== Peers by birth ===
A type of personal peerage, instituted in 1576 for the princes of the blood of France. This practically ensures that any adult prince of the blood is a peer of France. At the age of 15, they are allowed to sit among the other Peers of the Realm. The royal princes who actually sat in respect of this type of peerage, having reached their 15th year, were as follows, at the dates indicated:

- 1576-1582 prince Louis II de Bourbon-Montpensier (1513–1582), also duke-peer of Montpensier
- 1576-1584 prince Francis of France (1554–1584), also duke-peer of Anjou and of Alençon
- 1576-1588 prince Henri I de Bourbon-Condé (1552–1588), prince of Condé
- 1576-1589 prince Henri de Bourbon (1553–1610), also duke-peer of Vendôme, (King Henry III) of Navarre, king (Henry IV) of France
- 1576-1590 prince, cardinal Charles de Bourbon (1523–1590), also duke-peer of Graville
- 1576-1592 prince François de Bourbon-Montpensier (1542–1592), also duke-peer of Montpensier
- 1576-1614 prince François de Bourbon-Conti (1558–1614), prince of Conti
- 1577-1594 prince, cardinal Charles de Bourbon-Condé (1562–1594)
- 1581-1612 prince Charles de Bourbon (1566–1612), also count-peer of Soissons
- 1588-1608 prince Henri de Bourbon-Montpensier (1573–1608), also duke-peer of Montpensier
- 1603-1646 prince Henri II de Bourbon-Condé (1588–1646), prince of Condé, also duke-peer of Montmorency and of Albret
- 1619-1641 prince Louis de Bourbon (1604–1641), also count-peer of Soissons
- 1623-1660 prince Gaston d'Orléans (1608–1660), also duke-peer of Orléans
- 1636-1686 prince Louis II de Bourbon-Condé (1621–1686), prince of Condé, also duke of Bourbon and of Albret
- 1644-1666 prince Armand de Bourbon-Conti (1629–1666), prince of Conti
- 1655-1701 prince Philip II d'Orléans (1640–1701), also duke-peer of Orléans
- 1658-1709 prince Henri-Jules de Bourbon-Condé (1643–1709), prince of Condé, also duke-peer of Guise and of Montmorency
- 1676-1685 prince Louis-Armand I de Bourbon-Conti (1661–1685), prince of Conti, also duke-peer of La Vallière
- 1676-1711 prince Louis of France (1661–1711), dauphin of France
- 1679-1709 prince François-Louis de Bourbon-Conti (1664–1709), prince of Conti
- 1683-1710 prince Louis III de Bourbon-Condé (1668–1710), prince of Condé, also duke-peer of Bourbon and of Guise
- 1689-1723 prince Philip III d'Orléans (1674–1723), also duke-peer of Orléans
- 1697-1712 prince Louis of France (1682–1712), duke of Burgundy then dauphin of France
- 1698-1700 prince Philippe d'Anjou (1683–1746), duke of Anjou then king (Philip V) of Spain
- 1701-1714 prince Charles de Berry (1686–1714), duke of Berry, also duke-peer of Angoulême and of Alençon
- 1707-1740 prince Louis-Henri de Bourbon-Condé (1692–1740), prince of Condé, also duke-peer of Bourbon and of Guise
- 1711-1727 prince Louis-Armand II de Bourbon-Conti (1696–1727), prince of Conti, also duke-peer of Mercœur
- 1715-1760 prince Charles de Bourbon-Condé (1700–1760), count of Charolais
- 1718-1752 prince Louis III d'Orléans (1703–1752), also duke-peer of Orléans
- 1724-1771 prince Louis de Bourbon-Condé (1709–1771), count of Clermont
- 1732-1776 prince Louis-François I de Bourbon-Conti (1717–1776), prince of Conti, also duke-peer of Mercœur
- 1740-1785 prince Louis-Philip I d'Orléans (1725–1785), also duke-peer of Orléans
- 1744-1765 prince Louis of France (1729–1765), dauphin of France
- 1749-1790 prince Louis-François II de Bourbon-Conti (1734–1814), prince of Conti
- 1751-1790 prince Louis-Joseph de Bourbon-Condé (1736–1818), prince of Condé, also duke-peer of Bourbon and of Guise
- 1762-1790 prince Louis-Philippe-Joseph d'Orléans (1747–1793), also duke-peer of Orléans
- 1769-1774 prince Louis of France (1754–1793), duke of Berry then dauphin of France then king (Louis XVI) of France
- 1770-1790 prince Louis of France (1755–1824), count of Provence, also duke-peer of Anjou and of Alençon then king (Louis XVIII) of France
- 1771-1790 prince Louis-Henri-Joseph de Bourbon-Condé (1756–1830), duke of Bourbon, prince of Condé in 1818
- 1772-1790 prince Charles of France (1757–1836), count of Artois, also duke-peer of Angoulême and of Berry then king (Charles X) of France
- 1787-1790 prince Louis-Antoine-Henri de Bourbon-Condé (1772–1804), duke of Enghien
- 1788-1790 prince Louis-Philippe II d'Orléans (1773–1850), duke of Chartres, duke of Orléans in 1793 then king (Louis-Philippe I) of the French

== See also ==
- Peerage of France
- List of French peerages
- List of coats of arms of French peers

== Bibliography ==
Christophe Levantal, Ducs et pairs et duchés-pairies laïques à l'époque moderne (1519-1790), Paris, 1996
