= Count of Pardiac =

The Count of Pardiac was a title in the French nobility. The county of Pardiac is a part of the County of Astarac, including the lands of Rivière-Basse.

The title was created by Arnold II of Astarac[fr] and given to his younger son, Bernard the 1st, from which, the title was passed down into the families of Montlezun and Armagnac.

== House Astarac ==
1023 - After 1043: Bernard I Pelagos, Count of Pardiac, son of Arnaud II, Count of Astarac, married to Biverne

== House Montlezun ==
After 1043 - After 29 December 1088: Oger I d'Montlezun, son of Bernard I, first to take the surname of Montlezun after the castle in the county

At least after 29 December 1088 - After 1142: Guillame I d'Montlezun, son of Oger I, married to Marie.

Before at least 1174 - March 1182: Bernard II d'Montlezun, son of Guillaume I, married to Amelie.

March 1182 - At least before 7 April 1204 : Oger II of Montlezun

7 April 1204 - 1275 : Arnaud-Guilhem I, son of Oger II

Before July 1275 - 1300 : Arnaud-Guilhem II(died 1309), son of Arnaud-Guilhem I

1300 - 1340 : Arnaud-Guilhem III, son of Arnaud-Guildhem II, married to Geraude, Dame of Biran and d'Ordan, before the Pentecost of 1309

1340 - 13 August 1369: Arnaud-Guilhem IV, son of Arnaud-Guildhem III

1. married to a Countess of Durfort (without posterity); she died of an apparent addiction to medicine while he was away in the King's wars. He received a marriage pardon on 4 November 1349.
2. married to Eleanor de Peralta, Navarraise
3. married to Mabille d'Albert, daughter of Amanieu d'Albert, Lord of Verteuil (without posterity)

13 August 1369 - 1380: Jean I, son of Arnaud-Guilhem IV and Elenora of Peralta, unmarried, died in 1380

1380 - 1401 : Anne d'Montlezun, sister of previous, married to Géraud IV d'Armagnac, Viscount of Fézensaguet[fr] on 6 June 1379

== House Armagnac ==
1380 - 1401 : Géraud d'Armagnac, Viscount of Fésenzaguet, married to Anne de Montlezun, daughter of Arnaud Guillaume IV and Eleanor de Peralta.

1401 - 1402 : Jean II d'Armagnac (died 1402), Viscount of Fésenzaguet, Count of Pardiac, son of Géraud d'Armagnac, married to Margarita (1363-1443), Countess of Comminges (without posterity); Prisoner of Bernard VII

1402 - 1418 : Bernard VII of Armagnac (1360 - 1418), Count of Armagnac, married to Bonne de Berry, daughter of Jean de France, Duke of Berry, and Joan of Armagnac.

1418 - 1462: Bernard VIII of Armagnac, Count of Pardiac (1400–1462), Marche, and Castres, Duke of Nemours, son of Bernard VII. Married in 1429 to Éléonore de Bourbon[fr] (1412 - apx. 1464), Duchess of Nemours and Countess of Marche, daughter of James II of Bourbon, king consort of Naples, Count of Marche and Castres, and Beatrice of Evreux, Duchess of Nemours.

1462 - 1477 : Jacques d'Armagnac, Duke of Nemours (1433–1477), Count of Paridac, Castres, and Marche. Son of Bernard VIII. Married in 1462 to Louise d'Anjou[fr], daughter of Charles IV of Anjou, Count of Maine, and Isabella of Luxembourg. Executed in 1477 after being tried for treason. Property was confiscated by Charles VIII, but the counties of Pardiac and Nemours were returned to his son, Jean of Armagnac, in 1484.

1484 - 1500 : Jean d'Armagnac, Duke of Nemours (1467–1500), Count of Pardiac. Son of Jacques and Louise d'Anjou.

1500 - 1503 : Louis d'Armagnac, Duke of Nemours, Count of Pardiac and Guise. Second son of Jacques and Louise d'Anjou.

1503 - 1504 : Charlotte d'Armagnac (died 1504), daughter of Jacques and Louise d'Anjou. Married to Charles de Rohan-Gié[fr], Lord of Gie (without posterity).

At Charles' death, the county of Pardiac returned to the crown.

== Lineage ==
Bernard I Pelagos - 1st Count
Oger I d'Montlezun - 2nd Count
Guillame I d'Montlezun - 3rd Count
Bernard II d'Montlezun - 4th Count
Oger II d'Montlezun - 5th Count
Arnaud-Guilhem I - 6th Count
Arnaud-Guilhem II - 7th Count
Arnaud-Guilhem II - 8th Count
Arnaud-Guilhem IV - 9th Count
Jean I d'Montlezun - 10th Count; No Heirs
Anne d'Montlezun - 11th Countess; Married Geraud d'Armagnac
Jean II d'Armagnac - 12th Count; Son of Geraud, Prisoner of Bernard VII d'Armagnac
Bernard VII d'Armagnac - 13th Count
Bernard VIII d'Armagnac - 14th Count
Jacques d'Armagnac - 15th Count
Jean d'Armagnac - 16th Count
Louis d'Armagnac - 17th Count
Charlotte d'Armagnac - 18th Countess; Married Charles de Rohan-Gié

== Sources ==
- (fr) This article is partially or wholly derived from the French Wikipedia article entitled "Liste des comtes de Pardiac"
