= Jean d'Armagnac, Duke of Nemours =

Medieval nobleman (1467–1500)

Jean d'Armagnac, Duke of Nemours (1467–1500) was the son of Jacques d'Armagnac, Duke of Nemours and Louise of Anjou. His father's possessions were confiscated on his execution in 1477, but Jean was restored to Nemours and the family's other lands in 1484. He led a dissolute life, and his siblings sued him to prevent him from alienating the family lands to pay his debts. In 1489, he traded the viscounties of Carlat and Murat to Peter II, Duke of Bourbon for the county of l'Isle-Jourdain.

He married Yolande de La Haye (d. 1517) in 1492, but had no children. He was succeeded by his brother Louis, Count of Guise.

| Preceded by — | Duke of Nemours; Count of Castres and Pardiac; 1484–1500 | Succeeded by Louis |
| Preceded by Peter | Count of l'Isle-Jourdain; 1489–1500 | Succeeded by Louis |
