= House of Montoire =

Coat of arms of the Montoire family

The House of Montoire is an ancient family of the French nobility, close to the counts of Anjou and descended from the feudatories of the castle of Langeais, between Touraine and Anjou. It started with Nihard, Lord of Montoire. Later, through the marriages of Plaisante de Montoire and Helvise Doubleau, the possessions of Mondoubleau and Fréteval Langeais were added. The manor of Mondoubleau and, following the marriage of Pierre II de Montoire and Agnès de Vendôme, the county of Vendôme became part of the House of Montoire.

== House of Montoire ==
Nihard (+ 1059), seigneur de Montoire

Plaisante of Montoire

- 1)Married, Eudes I of Doubleau (+1057), seigneur de Montdoubleau,
- 2)Married, Aubry de Nouatre (+1072), seigneur de Montoire

Hugues II Doubleau (+1065), seigneur de Montdoubleau, son of Plaisante

Helvise Doubleau, daughter of Hugues II

- 1)Married, Payen de Fréteval (+1044), seigneur de Fréteval
- 2)Married, Hamelin II de Langeais (+1108), seigneur de Langeais and de Montoire, son of Gautier de Langeais, Viscount of Le Mans and Vendôme

1)Hildebert Payen, seigneur de Montdoubleau son of Payen of Freteval.

- Married Aia.

2)Peter I of Montoire (+1135), seigneur de Montoire, son of Hamelin II.

- Married, Ada

Philip de Montoire, seigneur de Montoire, son of Peter I.

- 1)Married, Aénor
- 2)Married Laetitia, Lady of Savonières

Peter II, seigneur de Montoire, son of Philip of Montoire and Laetitia.

- Married, Agnès of Vendôme, daughter of Bouchard IV, Count of Vendôme

John IV (+1230), seigneur de Montoire, Count of Vendôme, son of Peter II.

- Married, Eglantine

Peter (+1249), Count of Vendôme, son of John IV.

- Married, Jeanne de Mayenne (+1246)

Bouchard V (1225+1271), Count of Vendôme, son of Peter.

- Married, Marie de Roye

Jean V (1250+1315), Count of Vendôme, son of Bouchard V.

- Married, Eléonore de Montfort, Lady of Castres

Bouchard VI (1290+1354), Count of Vendôme and Lord of Castres, son of John V.

- Married in 1320, Alix de Dreux

Jean VI (+1364), Count of Vendôme and Lord of Castres, son of Bouchard VI.

- Married, Jeanne de Ponthieu

Catherine de Vendôme (+1412), Countess of Vendôme and Castres, daughter of John VI.

- Married, John I of Bourbon, Count of La Marche and of Vendôme

===>Counts of Vendôme through the House of Bourbon-La Marche

Bouchard VII (+1371), Count of Vendôme and Castres, son of John VI.

- Married, Isabelle of Bourbon (+1371)

Jeanne de Vendôme (+1372), Countess of Vendôme and Castres, daughter of Bouchard VII.
