= Rivière-Basse =

Natural region of Gascony, France

Location of the Rivière-Basse viscounty in historic Gascony

Rivière-Basse (French pronunciation: [ʁivjɛʁ bas]) is a natural region of Gascony to the north of the department of Hautes-Pyrénées and southwest of the department of Gers.

== Geography ==
Rivière-Basse is located in the middle Adour valley, around the river which marks a sharp bend between Bigorre and Gers. The main towns are Marciac and Plaisance (Gers); Maubourguet and Castelnau-Rivière-Basse (Hautes-Pyrénées).

The "pays" covers the fertile plains of the lower reaches of the Arros and Bouès rivers up to their confluence with the Adour. The terrain is made up of alluvium and boulbène, a highly sought-after soil for ceramics. The Bigourdan portion of the Adour valley lies downstream of Maubourguet, where the valley narrows; the slopes to the west of the Madiran vineyards (AOC) overlook the river plain. In the Gers portion of the Adour valley, the plain is around 5 km wide.

Together, with the Vic-Bilh[fr], the Rivière-Basse forms a coherent whole within the Pays du Val d'Adour (Madiran region).

== History ==
The Bouès valley comprised the ancient county of Pardiac.
