= Bernard d'Armagnac, Count of Pardiac =

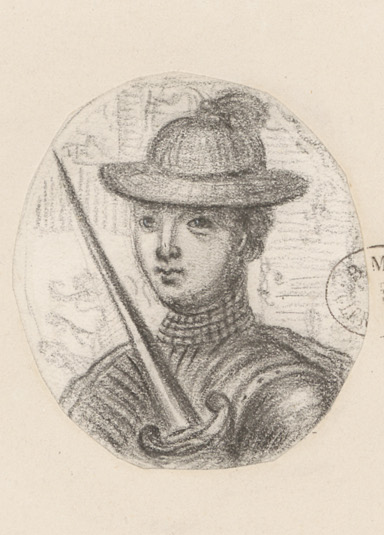
Bernard d'Armagnac

Bernard d'Armagnac, Count of Pardiac (died 1462) was a younger son of Bernard VII, Count of Armagnac and Bonne of Berry.

Bernard fought at the Battle of Patay in 1429. That year he married Eleanor of Bourbon-La Marche, daughter and ultimately heir of James II, Count of La Marche. Count James was the consort of Queen Joanna II of Naples. Bernard served as lieutenant-general in La Marche and governor of Limousin in 1441, and later as lieutenant-general of Languedoc and Roussillon in 1461.

Bernard was the father of:

- Jacques d'Armagnac, Duke of Nemours
- John d'Armagnac (1440-1493)

== Sources ==
- Potter, David (1995). Keen, Maurice (ed.). A History of France, 1460–1560: The Emergence of a Nation State. Macmillan.
- de Wavrin, Jean (2012). Hardy, William; Hardy, Edward L.C.P. (eds.). Recueil Des Chroniques Et Anchiennes Istories de la Grant Bretaigne, À Present Nommé Engleterre. Vol. 4: From A.D. 1431 to A.D. 1477. Cambridge University Press.
- Woodacre, Elena (2013). The Queens Regnant of Navarre: Succession, Politics, and Partnership, 1274-1512. Palgrave Macmillan.

Preceded by John I	Count of Pardiac; 1424–1462	Succeeded by James III
Preceded by James II	Count of Castres and La Marche; 1438–1462; With: Eleanor	Succeeded by James III
