= Louis d'Armagnac, Duke of Nemours =

French nobleman and politician

Louis d'Armagnac
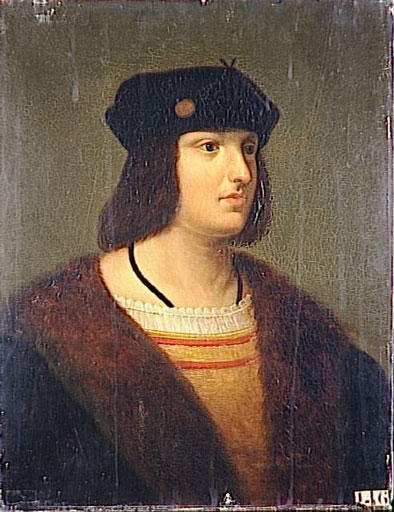

Viceroy of Naples
- In office 1501–1503
- Succeeded by: Ludovico II

Duke of Nemours
- In office 1500–1503
- Preceded by: Jean d'Armagnac
- Succeeded by: Gaston de Foix

Count of Guise
- In office 1491–1503
- Preceded by: Charles IV of Anjou
- Succeeded by: Marguerite d'Armagnac

Personal details
- Born: 1472 Normandy, France
- Died: 28 April 1503 (aged 30–31) Cerignola, Italy

Louis d'Armagnac, Duke of Nemours (1472; Normandy, France – 28 April 1503; Cerignola, Italy), was a French nobleman, politician and military commander who served as Viceroy of Naples from 1501-1503, during the Third Italian War. He was known for most of his life as the Count of Guise, and inherited the Duchy of Nemours following his brother Jean's death in 1500.

== Family ==
Louis was the third son of Jacques d'Armagnac, Duke of Nemours and Louise of Anjou. In 1491, he was made Count of Guise, a title last held by his uncle Charles IV, Duke of Anjou. Upon the death of his elder brother Jean in 1500, he became Duke of Nemours.

== Viceroy of Naples ==
Louis was made viceroy of Naples by Louis XII in 1501, during the Third Italian War. He was killed by an arquebus bullet at the battle of Cerignola on 28 April 1503.

== Sources ==
- Cuttler, S. H. (2003). The Law of Treason and Treason Trials in Later Medieval France. Cambridge University Press.
- Potter, David (2008). Renaissance France at war: Armies, Culture and Society, c.1480-1560. Boydell Press.

Preceded by Charles	Count of Guise; 1491–1503	Succeeded by to royal domain
Preceded by Jean	Duke of Nemours; Count of Castres, l'Isle-Jourdain and Pardiac; 1500–1503	Succeeded by Marguerite
