= Jacques d'Armagnac =

French noble (1433–1477)

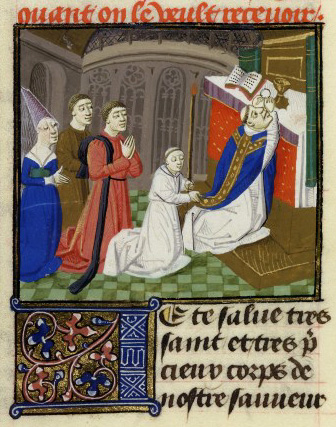
Jacques d'Armagnac praying at mass, illumination on parchment.

Jacques d'Armagnac (c. 1433 – 4 August 1477), duke of Nemours, was a 15th-century French nobleman and military leader. He served under King Charles VII of France in Normandy and Guienne, and was awarded honours by Louis XI. He also held the title of Count of Castres. He was the son of Count Bernard d’Armagnac and Éléonore de Bourbon-La Marche.

As the Count of Castres, Jacques served under Charles VII of France in Normandy in 1449 and 1450, and afterwards in Guienne. Louis XI awarded him with honours. In 1462, Jacques succeeded his father, and Louis XI married him to his god-daughter, Louise of Anjou, daughter of Charles of Le Maine. Louis XI also recognized his title to the Duchy of Nemours, which he had disputed with the King of Navarre.

Sent by Louis to pacify Roussillon, Nemours felt that he had been insufficiently rewarded for the rapid success of this expedition, and joined the League of the Public Weal in 1465. Subsequently, he reconciled with Louis, but soon resumed his intrigues. After twice pardoning him, the king's patience became exhausted, and he besieged the duke's chateau at Carlat and imprisoned him. Nemours was treated with the utmost rigour, being shut up in a cage. He was finally condemned to death and beheaded, 4 Aug 1477.

Jacques and Louise had:

- Jacques (d. young)
- Jean d'Armagnac, Duke of Nemours (1467–1500)
- Louis d'Armagnac, Duke of Nemours (1472–1503)
- Marguerite d'Armagnac, Duchess of Nemours (d. 1503), married Peter de Rohan (d.1514)
- Catherine d'Armagnac (d. 1487), married John II, Duke of Bourbon in 1484
- Charlotte d'Armagnac, Duchess of Nemours (d. 1504), married Charles de Rohan (d.1504)

== Sources ==
- de Carvalho, Helena Avelar (2021). An Astrologer at Work in Late Medieval France: The Notebooks of S. Belle. Brill.
- Potter, David (1995). Keen, Maurice (ed.). A History of France, 1460–1560: The Emergence of a Nation State. Macmillan.

Preceded by Bernard d'Armagnac, Count of Pardiac with Eleanor of Bourbon-La Marche	Duke of Nemours; Count of Castres, La Marche and Pardiac; 1462–1477	to royal domain
Preceded by Charles of Le Maine	Count of Beaufort-en-Champagne; 1462–1477; With: Louise of Anjou	to royal domain
