= Counts of Castres =

Castres-en-Albigenses was a dependence of the Viscount of Albi. The Viscounts of Albi granted Castres a city charter establishing a commune with the city, headed by consuls. During the Albigensian Crusade, the city quickly surrendered to Simon de Montfort, who gave it to his brother Guy de Montfort.

== Lords of Castres ==
=== House of Montfort-l'Amaury ===

1211–1228 : Guy de Montfort (died 1228), Lord of Ferté-Allais et de Bréthecourt, son Simon III de Montfort, Lord of Montfort and d'Amicie de Beaumont.

First marriage in 1204 to Helvis d'Ibelin (died before 1216)
Second marriage in 1224 to Briende de Beynes

1228–1240 : Philip I of Montfort (died 1270), Lord of Castres, and later Lord of Tyre and Toron, son of Guy de Montfort and d'Helvis d'Ibelin.

Married to Éléonore de Courtenay (died before 1230), daughter of Peter II of Courtenay and Yolanda of Flanders.
Second marriage in 1240 to Marie d'Antioche, Lady of Toron, daughter of Raymond-Roupen d'Antioche and Helvis de Lusignan

1240–1270 : Philip II of Montfort (died 1270), Lord of Castres, son of Philip of Montfort and d'Éléonore de Courtenay.

Married to Jeanne de Lévis-Mirepoix (died 30 June 1284), daughter of Guy I de Lévis, Lord of Mirepoix and Guibourge of Montfort.

1270–1300 : John of Montfort (died 1300), Lord of Castres, Count of Squillace, son of Philip II of Montfort and Jeanne de Levis-Mirepoix.

Married Isabella Maletta
Married Giovanna di Fasanella
Married in 1273 to Marguerite de Beaumont (died 1307)

1300–1338 : Éléonore de Montfort (died after 1338), Lady of Castres, sister of John of Montfort.

Married to John V (died 1315), Count of Vendôme

=== House of Vendôme-Montoire ===

1300–1315 : John V (died 1315), Count de Vendôme, Lord of Castres.

Married Éléonore de Montfort, Lady of Castres

1338–1354 : Bouchard VI de Vendôme (died 1354), Count of Vendôme and Lord of Castres, son of John V of Vendôme.

Married Alice of Brittany (died 1377), daughter of Arthur II, Duke of Brittany and Yolande de Dreux

1354–1356 : Jean VI de Vendôme (died 1364), Count of Vendôme and Lord of Castres, son of Bouchard VI.

Married Jeanne de Ponthieu (died 1376), daughter of John de Ponthieu, Count d'Aumale, and Catherine d'Artois.

In 1356, King John II of France raises Castres to a county.

== Counts of Castres ==
=== Maison de Vendôme-Montoire ===
1354–1364 : John VI of Vendôme (died 1364), Count of Vendôme and Castres

Married Jeanne de Ponthieu (died 1376), daughter of John of Ponthieu, Count d'Aumale, and Catherine d'Artois.

1364–1371 : Bouchard VII of Vendôme (died 1371), Count of Vendôme and Castres, son of John VI.

Married in 1368 Isabelle of Bourbon, daughter of James I, Count of La Marche and Jeanne de Châtillon

1371–1372 : Jeanne of Vendôme (died 1372), Countess of Vendôme and Castres, daughter of Bourchard VII.

1372–1403 : Catherine de Vendôme (died 1411), Countess of Vendôme and Castres, aunt of Jeanne, daughter of Jean VI, Count of Vendôme.

Married in 1364 to John of Bourbon-La Marche (died 1393), Count of La Marche.

=== House of Bourbon-La Marche ===

1362–1393 : John I of Bourbon, Count of La Marche, Vendôme and Castres.

Married Catherine of Vendôme (died 1411), Countess of Vendôme and Castres.

1393–1435 : James II (1370–1438), Count of La Marche and Castres, son of John I.

Married in 1406 to Béatrice d'Évreux (1392–1414)
Married in 1415 to Joan II (1375–1435), Queen of Naples.

1435–1462 : Éléonore of Bourbon (1412 – ca. 1464), Countess of La Marche, Castres and Duchess of Nemours, daughter of James II.

Married in 1429 to Bernard d'Armagnac (died 1462), Count of Pardiac.

=== House d'Armagnac ===

1438–1462 : Bernard d'Armagnac (died 1462), Count of Pardiac, of La Marche, Castres and Duke of Nemours.

Married in 1429 to Éléonore de Bourbon, daughter of James II and Béatrice d'Évreux.

1462–1476 : Jacques d'Armagnac (1433–1477), Count of Pardiac, La Marche and Duke of Nemours.

Married in 1462 to Louise d'Anjou (1445–1477).

- In 1476, Jacques d'Armagnac is tried for treason and his property confiscated by Louis XI. He bestows the county of Castres to one of his officers, Boffille de Juge.

=== House de Juge ===
1476–1494 : Boffille de Juge (died 1502)

Married in 1480 to Marie d'Albret, daughter of John I d'Albret, sire d'Albret, and Catherine de Rohan.
In 1494, in litigation with the heirs of Jacques d'Armagnac, Boffile yields Castres to his brother-in-law, Alain d'Albret.

=== House d'Albret ===

1494–1519 : Alain, sire d'Albret (1440–1522), son of John I d'Albret, sire d'Albret, and Catherine de Rohan.

Married to Frances, Countess of Périgord

From 1502 to 1519, possession of Castres is challenged by the daughter of Boffille de Juge. Finally, in 1519, irritated by the argument, Francis I of France reunites the county of Castres to the royal domain.
