= Nompar =

Nompar is a given name. Notable people with the name include:

- Anne Nompar de Caumont, countess of Balbi (1753–1832), mistress of the count of Provence, who later became Louis XVIII
- Antoine Nompar de Caumont (1632–1723), French courtier and soldier
- Armand-Nompar de Caumont, duc de la Force (1580–1675), Marshal of France and peer of France
- Henri-Nompar de Caumont, duc de La Force, (1582–1678), Duc de La Force and peer of France
- Jacques-Nompar de Caumont, duc de la Force (1558–1652), marshal of France and peer of France
- Nompar of Caumont (1391–1446), lord of Caumont, Castelnau, Castelculier and Berbiguières
