= Pierre Beaumesnil =

French collector

- Born: Around 1707 or 1718
- Died: 1787; Limoges
- Occupations: Actor, antique dealer, archaeologist, illustrator, epigraphist
- Employer: Academy of Inscriptions and Literature

Pierre Beaumesnil (born in Paris around 1718 – died in Limoges on March 27, 1787) was a French traveler, impresario, draftsman, and collector. Described by Louis Guibert as a "antiquarian actor," he was known for his drawings and descriptive works depicting monuments and archaeological remains from the Limousin, Aquitaine, and other regions of France. His approach reflected a pre-Romantic sensibility rather than a strictly scientific one.

Beaumesnil's artistic depictions, some of which remain unique visual and textual records still examined in historiography and archaeology, have been noted for their limited reliability. These works are now dispersed, poorly catalogued, and largely unpublished. While portions were compiled into collections at the end of the eighteenth century and occasionally reproduced, a significant part of Beaumesnil's drawings and notes has been lost or is presumed missing from the collections and archives intended to preserve them.

== Biography ==
According to Michaud, Pierre Beaumesnil was born into a modest family in central France, possibly in Paris around 1707 or 1718, though other sources propose dates such as 1715 or 1723. His birthplace may have been the parish of Saint-Jacques-la-Boucherie. (Note: According to Guibert, Martin (Martin 1812, pp. 64–66), who knew Beaumesnil, was the source of many 19th-century biographies: “Mr. de Beaumesnil, from a noble family, was an antiquarian of rare merit. He combined deep historical knowledge with the skills of a skilled draftsman. In his work, there was purity, correctness, and meticulous accuracy when copying ruins and medals. With such valuable talents, Beaumesnil was forced to become an actor to survive, changing troupes every year in order to travel and successively draw the various monuments of France. At the age of 60, he arrived in Limoges with a troupe in which he played the roles of Père-Noble. He had a head of fine character, which suited this role perfectly. Soon he met some learned men and discovered, within the Feuillans community, drawings of ancient monuments of which only faint traces remained. He copied them with the perfection and exactitude that were his own. He was welcomed by Mr. de Lépine and introduced to Mr. Daine, then Intendant of the Province; this magistrate made him known to the Minister, supported his recommendation of drawings and manuscripts, and Beaumesnil was appointed draftsman of the Académie des Inscriptions et Belles-Lettres, with a fixed salary of 1,500 francs, not including travel expenses. At 73, returning from Anjou, Berry, and other neighboring provinces where he had gone, by order of the Academy, to draw some medieval monuments, he was struck by dropsy of the chest, which quickly removed him from the sciences and from his friends, leaving, as the only fortune to his widow, over 80 years old, a few pounds and the manuscripts of his works. Six months later, Madame de Beaumesnil died without heirs and made Mr. de Lépine her universal legatee.”) Louis Guibert notes that Beaumesnil received strong artistic and drawing training but limited literary education, suggesting he did not come from a wealthy background. His work reflects an imperfect yet genuine knowledge of Latin epigraphy and ancient Greek, as well as an unusual interest in archaeology and history for his period, particularly if he was self-taught.

Around 1746, Beaumesnil joined a troupe of provincial actors. (Note: Lekain in 1768 names a singer "Beaumesnil," and particularly a couple "La Ruette [member of the Comédie Italienne, and her companion; a monsieur and a mademoiselle]" regarding the third chapter of the free admissions granted by the Comédie-Française, in his Mémoires, Paris, 1825, p. 168 (in the section "Memoir to MM. du Conseil, proving that the multiplicity of free admissions is a great obstacle to the clarity necessary in collecting revenue, March 10, 1768"). It does not appear that this refers to our itinerant couple or their acquaintances (cf. Annales dramatiques, or Dictionnaire général des théâtres, 5, Paris, 1810, p. 303). Guibert (1900, p. 49 n. 1) found no trace of their Parisian activities, nor any connection with homonyms (p. 51).) According to Allou, he explained to his acquaintances—Martial de Lépine, subdelegate of the intendant of Limoges and permanent secretary of the city's Agricultural Society; the abbé Joseph Nadaud; and Dom Col (1723–1795)—that this decision reflected his interest in travel and archaeological exploration. Louis Guibert later suggested, with some irony, that Beaumesnil had instead followed his wife on tour and adopted the itinerant lifestyle characteristic of the protagonists in Le Roman comique.

Beaumesnil traveled through several French provinces, including Limousin, Berri, Angoumois, and Agenais, where he produced pen drawings of monuments accompanied by personal notes. According to Guibert, he may also have traveled to Italy in his youth and possibly to Egypt.

From 1747 to 1775, his primary occupation was itinerant theater, after which he settled permanently in Limoges. Guibert suggests that he acted as the company's impresario. His wife, Aimée Gouslin (c. 1701–1788), also recorded as Irenée Garlin in her death certificate, was an actress who often performed leading roles. Both reportedly received the highest share of the troupe's income in its later years.

Beaumesnil's drawing plates and texts were primarily created to fulfill commissions for "artist’s views" from antiquarians, who appreciated them for their depictions of monuments, even if they contained idealized elements. Retrospectively, François Michel noted in 1993 that "his idealized vision of the Tower of Vesunna seems less absurd than the reconstructions imagined by the abbé Audierne of the oppidum of La Curade." In recognition of his work, Marius-Jean-Baptiste-Nicolas Daine (1730–1804), the intendant of Limousin, secured for Beaumesnil the title of correspondent of the Académie des Inscriptions et Belles-Lettres in 1780, accompanied by a pension of 1,500 livres, including 500 livres allocated for travel expenses. Pérouse de Montclos (1982–1983, pp. 80–81) notes that Beaumesnil submitted reports to the Academy from 1779 to 1784.

Pierre Beaumesnil died on March 27, 1787, in Limoges (Note: The death certificate published in Guibert 1881, pp. 96–97, does not mention excommunication of actors (but refrains from giving him the profession of actor): “On the twenty-eighth of March, 1787, was interred in the cemetery Mr. Pierre de la Ruette de Beaumenil, correspondent of the Academy, born in Paris, parish of St. Jacque-la-Boucherie, husband in life of Mlle Irenee (?) Garlin, born in Paris, parish of St. Sulpice, deceased yesterday at five in the evening in the house of Mr. Castelnaud (?) present parish, aged sixty-nine years, having received the sacrament of penance from Mr. Vitrac, parish priest of Montjovis, who signed with the undersigned as required. — Coste, parish priest of St. Michel-de-Pistorie. — Vitrac, parish priest of Montjovy. — Nouhalier. — A fourth illegible name [bookseller G.-N. Isecq, according to Guibert 1900, p. 56.") and was buried in the cemetery of the Black Penitents of Saint-Michel-de-Pistorie. Accounts of his age at death vary: the abbé Legros, who knew him, reported 64 years; Guibert, based on the death record, reported 69; Martin, also an acquaintance, reported 72; and other sources cited by Espérandieu, including Tripon, suggested 80, though this figure is uncertain.

== Fragmentary knowledge of a dispersed or lost work ==
=== State and location of the archives and drawings ===
The known manuscripts, drawings, and archives of Pierre Beaumesnil—whose provenance is often uncertain—as well as copies made by Tersan, Allou, and Tripon, are primarily held at the Bibliothèque nationale de France (BnF) in the Department of Manuscripts or the Prints Cabinet, and in various scholarly societies, libraries, and departmental archives in Poitiers, Limoges, Périgueux, Agen, Aix, Bordeaux, and at the Institut. In 1900, Louis Guibert compiled an inventory of the manuscripts and copies relating to Limoges that were known to exist; however, by that time, much of Beaumesnil's work and documentation were already untraceable or no longer accessible.

According to known authors and documents, Beaumesnil's sheets and collections mainly originate from several sources:

- A donation, exchange, or sale—possibly following a commission—to an antiquarian, scholar, or one of his patrons, sometimes to a civil or religious institution, of an original or a duplicate made by Beaumesnil himself.
- The collections (or duplicates of collections and excerpts) sent to the Academy from 1779 to 1784, and those sent before he was appointed a correspondent.
- The Beaumesnil estate (various papers, notes, drawings, sketches, preparatory versions, possibly his library, and his collections of objects and engravings).
- Copies were made by scholars and engravers who consulted his works over the centuries.
- The collection of the abbé de Tersan (1737–1819), of unknown—probably mixed—origin, was partially acquired by Alexandre Lenoir.
- The collection of Taillefer (1761–1833), also of unknown provenance, was partially acquired by the abbé Audierne.

Beaumesnil's notebooks have at times been altered or disappeared from their repositories, and no comprehensive inventory of his works and archives has been conducted since 1900. The surviving materials are generally considered incomplete, and some notes or sections may have been removed. Likely, certain sheets or collections dispersed since the late eighteenth century are now held in private collections or in archival holdings that remain unlisted or unidentified.

=== The loss of the collections sent to the Academy ===
Despite some criticisms of Beaumesnil's work, the images and texts he compiled, prepared, and sent through the Intendant of the généralité of Limoges to the Institut de France constitute a notable collection, providing a distinctive record of eighteenth-century perceptions of heritage, much of which has been lost.

No comprehensive inventory exists of the materials he sent as the Academy's correspondent between 1779 and 1784, although it is known that additional notebooks were submitted in earlier years, possibly in response to specific commissions.

==== A large portion of Beaumesnil's collection ====
After 1787, the abbé Legros, historian of the diocese of Limoges, noted that the collections Beaumesnil sent to the Academy represented a significant portion of his broader compilation of copies of ancient works. Having consulted the materials at Beaumesnil's residence, Legros was likely well acquainted with their contents.

In 1789, the abbé Lespine reported that at least one of Beaumesnil's collections—possibly all—was held in the Academy's depository at the Louvre under the care of the permanent secretary, Dacier. Minister Henri Bertin was aware of these collections (Note: Bertin had, in any case, preserved a duplicate or copy of the notebook on Périgueux, now in the Archives of the Académie des Inscriptions et Belles-Lettres (Cote C 80 [notebook 1]). This notebook was found in Bertin's archives and is currently in the Taillefer collection at the Departmental Archives of Dordogne (Cote 24. Ms 29).) and had commissioned a project from Beaumesnil. Lespine also noted that he had traveled to Limoges before Beaumesnil's death to consult his sketches.

In 1812, Paul Esprit Marie Joseph Martin, later secretary of the Agricultural, Scientific and Artistic Society of the Department of Haute-Vienne, wrote that Beaumesnil had traveled extensively and drawn various monuments in France. He also copied drawings of ancient monuments preserved by the Feuillants community, many of which existed only as faint traces. Martin identified Beaumesnil, along with de Lépine and Legros, as a principal contributor to the collection of materials intended for the history of the Limousin. He further described Beaumesnil as a draftsman for the Académie des Inscriptions et Belles-Lettres, salaried on the recommendation of Intendant Marius-Jean-Baptiste-Nicolas Daine, after providing drawings and manuscripts to Minister Bertin.

By 1818, all the volumes delivered to the library of the Académie des belles-lettres by Beaumesnil were reportedly held in the boxes of the Mazarine Library, and none of the manuscripts were considered lost at that time. Millin, a member of the Académie des Inscriptions et Belles-Lettres since 1804, and Chaudruc, who later became a correspondent of the same academy in 1837, documented this status.

According to Guibert (1900, p. 61), in addition to the references noted by Millin, several communications of drawings and reports sent to the Académie des Inscriptions et Belles-Lettres were mentioned by Legros, Duroux, Allou, and Juge de Saint-Martin. Chevallier also reported that the Institut held, for Limoges and the Limousin region, seven notebooks, in addition to collections relating to other regions and cities.

==== Symptomatic case of the remains of the Bishop's palace of Limoges ====
Around 1759, Beaumesnil visited Limoges and drew the remains uncovered during the demolition of the old Bishop's Palace, which had begun in 1757. According to de Lépine (Note: "[Cited in Espérandieu] ‘In 1757,’ said Mr. de Lépine, cited by Nadaud, ‘while examining the boundary walls of the future episcopal palace, inscriptions from the most ancient period for our province were found, piled in the place where they had been buried, mixed with capitals and bases of Doric columns, pieces of cornice, on one of which was a dolphin in bas-relief. It is said that near the place where they were found there was a gate called St-Esprit (perhaps the one later named Jeu-d’Amour).’ [Espérandieu continues] ‘Cippi and capitals were incorporated into the foundations of the episcopal palace. Beaumesnil took the opportunity to present, as discoveries in these excavations, first some inscriptions of his own making, then some revolting obscenities which could make one believe “there had been here a temple of Priapus or of the Good Goddess" (Allou).’” Espérandieu adds in a note: “The old episcopal palace was demolished in 1757, when Monseigneur du Coëtlosquet, called 18 years earlier to the episcopal seat of Limoges, decided to build a new palace. Entrusted by Louis XV with the education of the princes, his grandsons, Monseigneur du Coëtlosquet left to his successor and relative, Monseigneur d’Argentré, the task of laying the first stone of this building. The ceremony took place in 1766; the palace was not completed until 21 years later.") (as cited by Nadaud and Espérandieu), these remains included inscriptions of ancient origin for the region, Doric capitals and column bases, and fragments of cornices, including one decorated with a dolphin in bas-relief. Guibert also noted the presence of monuments featuring priapic emblems. Duroux (1811) stated that Beaumesnil sent copies of his drawings to the Académie des Inscriptions et Belles-Lettres (Note: According to Tripon 1837 (p. 35), for whom "these drawings have been lost," only "some preparatory sketches [were] saved from oblivion by Mr. Martin." It is this set of preparatory sketches, apparently then in Mr. Ruffin's collection, that Tripon in 1837 used as the basis to produce the plates of his special series. These sketches may be part of the collection preserved by Mr. Edmond Panet in 1969, and microfilmed by the Departmental Archives of Haute-Vienne (Cote 1 Mi 225, 1 roll, 2.50 m, negative).) at that time. The remains were later (Note: Regarding inscriptions seen only by Beaumesnil, Espérandieu refers (Espérandieu 1891, p. 181) to "apocryphal monuments" (see p. 240 no. 117, p. 252-254 no. 129-130, p. 259-261 no. 137-138, and perhaps p. 263 no. 142).) either destroyed at the request of the Bishop of Limoges, Louis Charles du Plessis d’Argentré, or incorporated into the foundations of the new palace. (Note: None of these remains seem to have been found during preventive excavations carried out for the expansion of the Municipal Museum of the Évêché in 2004 and 2007 (cf. Cyrille Pironnet, "Limoges: Musée municipal de l’Évêché (phase 2),” in Pironnet, Cyrille (2007). "ADLFI. Archéologie de la France: Informations [suite de Gallia Informations]" [ADLFI. Archaeology of France: Information [continuation of Gallia Information]]. Adlfi. Archéologie de la France - Informations. Une Revue Gallia (in French). doi:10.4000/adlfi.7270.)

Allou described Beaumesnil as "one of the most zealous correspondents" of the Académie des Inscriptions et Belles-Lettres. He noted that a particular work, which was never published, appears not to have reached its intended destination, and its fate is uncertain, although some sources indicate that Beaumesnil's manuscripts were deposited in the Mazarine Library.

Beaumesnil's drawings of the remains of the Bishop's Palace were later viewed with suspicion, with some critics questioning their authenticity (Note: Even so, since then, Michel 1993, pp. 21–22, without committing to the work done in Limoges or Bordeaux, observes that a "false sculpture" declared by Camille Jullian was rather a composition from two elements still displayed under the cloister of the Périgord museum, whose appendages Beaumesnil had "greatly exaggerated." Further, regarding the inscriptions of Périgueux, a "too systematic approach to the actor’s drawings [by Otto Hirschfeld, in CIL XII, p. 82, 1888 — and CIL XIII, 1899] maintains doubt and leads us to reconsider judgments concluding to a falsification.") and objecting to their erotic content, including the abbé Legros, who may not have visited the site. The disappearance of the inscriptions and sculptures contributed to ongoing debate and limited interest in Beaumesnil's work by Millin, despite Millin’s extensive consultation of the materials and his positions as conservator and professor of archaeology, later president of the Conservatory of the National Library, and member of the National Institute from 1804. In contrast, the abbé Martial de Lépine, (Note: Neither the Institute's collection nor the inheritance from Lépine's son seems to have drawn the attention or responsibility of Millin.) a witness to the remains and later Beaumesnil's legatee, and Minister Bertin, an antiquities connoisseur and possible recipient of Beaumesnil's initial dispatches after 1759, did not question the authenticity of the materials.

==== Rediscovered notebooks on the antiquities of Périgueux ====
In 1932, Adrien Blanchet, with the assistance of François Renié, (Note: Additionally, Maurrassian and royalist, he is also the author of "Un inventaire des antiques de l'Académie des Inscriptions et Belles-Lettres en 1749" [An inventory of antiquities belonging to the Académie des Inscriptions et Belles-Lettres in 1749]. Journal des savants (in French): 23–33. 1925.) secretary of the Académie des Inscriptions et Belles-Lettres (AIBL), discovered the notebook produced during Beaumesnil's third trip to Périgueux in 1784, which had been sent shortly afterward. During the same research, Blanchet also examined notebooks from 1763 and 1772, preserved in the archives of the AIBL and received in 1780.

These two collections remain the only ones from Beaumesnil's work known to be held at the Institut. Additionally, a copy by the abbé Lespine, held in the Manuscripts Department of the Bibliothèque nationale de France, and a probable duplicate by Beaumesnil himself, preserved in Taillefer's collection at Périgueux, have been identified as corresponding to the 1763–1772 notebook on the antiquities of Périgueux.

=== Various losses of the Beaumesnil Estate ===
Guibert (1900, p. 59) reported that the archives of the Beaumesnil estate, including papers, notes, sketches, drawings, and engravings not yet distributed by Beaumesnil, were successively inherited by Mme Beaumesnil (born Aimée Gouslin), then by M. de Lépine in 1788, and subsequently by his son after 1805. The collection was dispersed around 1808–1809 following the latter's death.

==== After 1808 and the death of the Abbé de Lépine's son ====
At that time, following notification through the prefectural administration, the Academy of Agen acquired Beaumesnil's notebook on the antiquities of Agen from the Lépine estate. It is possible that other institutions, including Millin, former director of the National Library and member of the Institut, and Alexandre Lenoir, administrator of the Musée des Monuments Français, were informed of the collection's availability, but there is no evidence that they took action. It is also unclear whether the abbé de Tersan or Lenoir added to their personal collections on this occasion, although by 1821 Lenoir had acquired some of Beaumesnil's notebooks, reportedly intending to publish their illustrations.

According to Leroux (1890), after 1809, part of the Lépine estate was held at Limoges City Hall, possibly as a deposit awaiting buyers, and may have been consulted around 1838 by Prosper Mérimée or previously by Charles-Nicolas Allou before 1821. This portion of the estate subsequently appears to have been lost. Another part was purchased by M. Ruffin, a justice of the peace and member of the Agricultural, Scientific, and Artistic Society of the Department of Haute-Vienne, who retained it in 1837; excerpts from these documents were published by Tripon. The collection was later inherited by Ruffin's wife, who died around 1855.

==== Dispersal of the Ruffin Estate in 1855 ====
Guibert (1900, p. 61) indicates that part of the documents from the Ruffin estate were inherited or acquired by Paul Mariaux, a lawyer and grandson of Maurice Ardant (1793–1867), curator of monuments and archivist of Haute-Vienne; Léonce Pichonnier, a manufacturer from Limoges; and possibly by Mme Rupin. According to Leroux, the collector Ch. Nivet-Fontaubert, (Note: As a merchant, he is said to have been married to the painter Amelie Nivet-Fontaubert (née Imbert, Limoges, 1820), according to Gazette des beaux-arts, Paris, July 1870, p. 225. Their name would combine the birth names of her husband and his mother (cf. Miltgen, Véronique (2002). Peintures du XIXe siècle, 1800–1914: catalogue raisonné [19th-century paintings, 1800–1914: catalogue raisonné] (in French). Vol. 2. Tours: Musée des beaux-arts de Tours. p. 553. ISBN 2-903331-13-8.).) vice president of the Archaeological and Historical Society of the Limousin, purchased documents from Pichonnier and Rupin and made them available to researchers, including Émile Espérandieu, in the late nineteenth century.

Some notebooks belonging to Paul Mariaux described by Louis Guibert (pp. 61, 63–69) may have been the property of Mme du Boucheron (Beynac) in 1957.

==== Disappearance of the Nivet-Fontaubert collection ====
The Nivet-Fontaubert collection appears to have been lost or dispersed since the early twentieth century, although in 1963 Geneviève François-Souchal expressed hope of recovering parts of it in Limoges. A volume on Les Environs de Limoges, noted by Louis Guibert in 1900 and from which excerpts were previously provided to Émile Espérandieu, may correspond to the copy from the Edmond Panet collection, a microfilmed version of which has been held by the Departmental Archives of Haute-Vienne since 1969.

==== Case of the notebook on the antiquities of Agen ====
In 2017, the Academy of Agen published a reproduction of the 47-page manuscript on the antiquities of the city of Agen, annotated in 1812 by Jean Florimond Boudon de Saint-Amans. The manuscript had been acquired by the Academy in 1808 from the estate of Lépine's son, through the intervention of its president, the prefect Christophe de Villeneuve, and was subsequently preserved in the Academy's archives before 1977.

=== Collection of the Abbé de Tersan and the Lenoir archive ===
Some documents collected by Alexandre Lenoir are believed to have originated from the collection of the abbé de Tersan (Charles-Philippe Campion de Tersan, 1737–1819), which was sold by Grivaud de la Vincelle. The previous ownership and acquisition circumstances are not documented. Guibert, however, questioned whether any part of this collection, particularly the materials related to the Limousin, came from the Beaumesnil estate. The complete set of Beaumesnil's original notebooks was acquired by Lenoir in 1821 from the bookseller Nepveu and has been held at the Bibliothèque nationale de France since 1938.

The tracings and notes by the abbé de Tersan, based on drawings by Beaumesnil and possibly intended for publication, were acquired by the Department of Manuscripts of the Bibliothèque nationale de France shortly after he died in 1819.

== A Collection effort criticized from the early 19th century ==
The quality of Beaumesnil's drawings and descriptions of monuments was criticized quite early by several specialists, notably by Millin (1811), Chaudruc (1818, pp. 324–325), Saint-Amans (1812, p. 251), Allou (1821, pp. 58 (Note: Regarding Beaumesnil's assumptions about the origin of the materials necessary for the construction of the Limoges Arenas: We shall have more than one occasion to note inaccuracies of this kind in Beaumesnil's observations, and it seems that the same occurred in most regions whose monuments he described. Therefore, his opinions should be accepted with great caution, while still doing justice to his zeal and taking advantage of what in his work is truly useful. Allou 1821, p. 58) or 74 n.1 and following), and Mérimée (1838, pp. 100–102), who reproached him for relying more on imagination than reality and for copying works without citing them. Camille Jullian (1890, p. 254) devoted a scathing chapter to him, summarizing: “He copied some inscriptions from the originals with considerable inaccuracy; he duplicated these inscriptions by inventing variants of his own and turning them into new texts […]; he drew monuments that did not exist, applying to them inscriptions he copied from books […]; finally, he created inscriptions from the titles, subtitles, or phrases of printed works." As for Émile Espérandieu, he described Beaumesnil as "the most shameless forger produced by the eighteenth century" and devoted a 48-page chapter to the 67 "false or suspect inscriptions," using Jullian's subtitle, "the work of Beaumesnil," in his book on the Inscriptions de la cité des Lemovices.

More recent assessments of Beaumesnil's work have been more nuanced. Gaston Dez (1969) noted that Beaumesnil's drawings and commentaries can be useful when critically examined. In 1998, Pierre Pinon observed that his drawings aimed for precision, though not always executed skillfully, and noted that Beaumesnil occasionally reconstructed missing parts, altered contexts, or introduced elements not present in the originals.

Beaumesnil's work combined descriptive documentation with personal interpretations of antiquity, sometimes incorporating imaginative or erotic elements, (Note: According to Tripon, "During the demolition of the Évêché [of Limoges] in 1759, several very curious objects were discovered, some of which were of revolting obscenity, which prompted Monseigneur d’Argentré, bishop, to have them destroyed. Beaumesnil obtained permission to draw them, but these drawings were lost [...] Some of these monuments may have been part of an ancient temple of Priapus, the creative force of Nature. The emblems, which in the current state of our morals seem the delirium of depravity, were perhaps only the expression of a pious feeling and hope in immortality." Tripon adds, "While publishing these drawings, which seem to us of highly significant interest, with a caution easily understood, we believed it necessary to interrupt the pagination order so that it would be optional for our subscribers to omit these two installments." (Cambon, Pierre (2014). "Un paravent de Kim Hong-do au musée Guimet, à Paris" [A screen by Kim Hong-do at the Guimet Museum in Paris]. Arts Asiatiques (in French). 69: 75–94. doi:10.3406/arasi.2014.1865. Archived from the original on September 28, 2017.).) which made it difficult for nineteenth-century scholars to assess its documentary value. Contemporary evaluations often overlooked that in eighteenth-century Haute-Vienne, few laymen, such as de Lépine, the subdelegate of the intendant's office, engaged with historical remains (Texier, 2016 [2014], p. 2). They also did not fully recognize Beaumesnil's role as a collector and promoter of emerging heritage knowledge, which contributed to the mixed reception of his legacy.

Certain adjectives used by nineteenth-century scholars to describe Beaumesnil reflected condescension, prudishness, limited knowledge, or bias. (Note: As in Guibert 1900, p. 54: “We cannot quite judge the actor: he held (at least at the end of his career) the roles of ‘pères nobles,’ and had ‘a head of fine character which suited this role perfectly’ (according to Mr. Martin [1811]). As an archaeologist, as we shall see, he was judged rather harshly. As a man, we do not know him much; but the little we know does not inspire us with much sympathy or full esteem. The deviations of his pen attest to the mischievousness of the most vulgar actor and a pronounced taste for obscenity. Perhaps the artist’s morals were, at least in the second half of his career, less licentious than his imagination. — The man had much aplomb and knew how to convey a high idea of his knowledge to modest provincial scholars dazzled by his eloquence and the richness of his portfolios. The Abbé Legros, for example, shows in several places a genuine deference for Beaumesnil’s authority. — We also know that the archaeologist was unscrupulous and would willingly forget to mention the authors of the original works from which he drew extensively, sometimes even copying them without ceremony. He seems, moreover, to have made his drawings and notes available, with some obligingness, to the antiquarians with whom he corresponded.") His profession as an actor, particularly as an itinerant performer, was often highlighted dismissively. These critical and sometimes anachronistic remarks may have influenced the custodians of Beaumesnil's work, including the Institut, and contributed to a lack of systematic preservation of his materials.

=== A nomadic artist in the provinces during the era of cabinets of curiosities ===
Due to the limited and largely unchanged documentation since 1900, the reasons and choices that led Pierre Beaumesnil to produce his extensive and original body of work can only be inferred from the internal logic of his images and texts. Similarly, the cultural and personal background of this traveling, versatile, and possibly self-taught artist in the mid-eighteenth century remains difficult to reconstruct. Remarks attributed to Beaumesnil to Martial de Lépine, concerning his motivation to engage with antiquity and scholarly pursuits, are noted in some accounts, although they may reflect Lépine's interpretation. It has also been suggested that Beaumesnil may have been associated with the theatrical community in Paris during this period.

Beaumesnil's modest living conditions suggest that some of his work was produced or adapted to generate income from a relatively affluent social environment, including local notables and clergymen who were assembling cabinets of curiosities or contributing to institutional documentation. Certain works, such as copies of engravings, maps, and plans, appear to have been created primarily for financial support and demonstrate both the range of his technical skills and the extent of his professional network.

The distinction between the parts of Beaumesnil's collection that were created for different purposes is not always clearly perceptible. Without knowledge of the potential patrons for whom he may have worked, it can cautiously be observed that some of his works display observations and collections of information that are relatively rigorous for the period. In other instances, however, they appear to be freely enriched reconstructions of what he may have seen, read, or heard, and some must be regarded as artistic projects or deliberately personal creations.

== Known collections, manuscripts, and copies ==
=== In the Lenoir collection of the BnF's Print Room (originals by Beaumesnil from the collection of Abbé de Tersan) ===
- Antiquités & monumens du Bourbonnais et de partie de la Bourgogne
- Antiquités de la France inédites [et notamment d'Arles]
- Antiquités des villes de Saintes, Périgueux, Bénac, Guéret, etc. suivant l'ordre de mes voyages
- Dessins de divers monumens antiques mobiles ; Antiquités et monumens anciens de l'Auvergne [VIe cahier ?]
- Antiquités et opuscules divers
- Antiquités d'Agen, Albi, Euze, Auch, Moissac, La Réole, Rodez, Uzès, Carcassonne, Perpignan, Lectoure, Tarbes, Bayonne, Béarn, Narbonne
  - According to Louis Guibert and Arquié-Bruley 2002; documents concerning Agen and Albi are missing, i.e. up to page 37—perhaps the copy concerning Agen, in the Lot-et-Garonne Departmental Archives, reference number 35 J 30? — Espérandieu [1888, pp. 141–142 n. 1] assumes that a collection on "Alby" was in the Bibliothèque Mazarine).
- Sculptures et Tombeaux du XIe au XVIe siècle. Voyages archéologiques exécutés vers 1780–1786, spécialement dans le Maine, le Poitou, la Touraine, Arles, Besançon et Moissac

=== In the Manuscripts Department of the BnF (manuscripts and tracings by Abbé de Tersan; Périgord collection) ===
- "Calques [réalisés et annotés par l'abbé de Tersan] de monuments dessinés par Beaumesnil en 1744, 1747, 1771, 1772, 1774 et 1777, classés par ordre alphabétique des villes d'origine" [Layers [created and annotated by the abbot of Tersan] of monuments drawn by Beaumesnil in 1744, 1747, 1771, 1772, 1774, and 1777, classified in alphabetical order by city of origin.] (in French).
- Collection [of tracings by the abbot of Tersan] known as "Pas Interfolié," 360 leaves, 375 × 280 mm (BnF Manuscripts, Fr. 6955).
- "Périgord 71–75" (in French).
- "Recherches sur la province de Périgord, 5" [Research on the province of Périgord, 5] (in French).

=== The collections sent to the Academy between 1779 and 1784, and even in 1759 (mostly considered lost) ===
Notes: (Note: See the authors who consulted these documents in Guibert 1900, pp. 60–61: “Almost all authors who dealt with Beaumesnil repeated, on the authority of Millin (Millin 1811, p. 748) or in Chaudruc & de Saint-Amans 1818, pp. 324–325, we believe, that the Bibliothèque Mazarine and the Library of the Institute preserved a significant portion of the actor’s manuscripts. That the Archives of the Académie des Inscriptions possessed many drawings and reports or notes sent by him is not doubtful. Several of these communications are noted by Legros [in his manuscripts at the Departmental Archives of Haute-Vienne, by Duroux 1811, p. 124, by Allou, by Juge de Saint-Martin]. Concerning notably the monuments with priapic emblems found in the excavations of the Évêché, Duroux and Tripon report that the actor, having obtained permission in 1759 to draw these objects, sent figures to the Academy, and that ‘only a few sketches of his work were saved from oblivion by Mr. Martin, secretary of the Royal Agricultural Society.’ In any case, we have been told twice, twelve or fifteen years apart, in the most categorical manner, that neither the Library of the Institute nor the Mazarine possess any of Beaumesnil’s papers. Mr. Le Blant received the same response.") (Note: Only "Cote C 80 includes 2 notebooks, one entitled Antiquités de Périgueux recueillies en l’année 1763, augmentées de quelques autres à un second séjour que j’y fis en 1772, received by the Academy in 1780, of 20 pages; this is the one that was displayed at the exhibition. The second, Supplément aux monuments de Périgueux, découverts vers la fin de 1783, etc., of 8 pages, with a note from the Academy: ‘This notebook, sent to me by Mr. de Meulan d’Ablois, Intendant of Limoges, reached me on October 14, 1784’,” and there is no trace of other memoirs, according to the Conservation of the Archives of the Institute (email of June 18, 2018).)

- Antiquités de Périgueux recueillies en l’année 1763, augmentées de quelques autres à un second séjour que j’y fis en 1772, 20 p., folio. (Archives of the Académie des Inscriptions et Belles-Lettres, reference C 80 [notebook 1]; exhibited at the Vesunna Museum in Périgueux in 2017).
- Supplément aux monuments de Périgueux, découverts vers la fin de 1783, etc., 8 p., 28 fig., folio, sent by Meulan d'Ablois in 1784 (Archives of the Académie des Inscriptions et Belles-Lettres, reference C 80 [notebook 2]; description in Adrien Blanchet 1932, pp. 171–172).
- Les cahiers Antiquités d'Alby et Antiquités de Limoges, at the Bibliothèque Mazarine according to Émile Espérandieu (1888, pp. 141–142 n. 1) but not seen by the author—a set of notebooks that are currently untraceable.
- "Dessins des objets exhumés lors des travaux de déblai effectués en 1757, 1758 et 1759 à l'Évêché de Limoges [dits monuments à emblèmes priapiques]," made in 1759 and sent to the Academy, according to Guibert (1900, pp. 60–61), citing Duroux and Tripon as references—notebook currently untraceable; see copies of the said special series or optional deliveries by Jean-Baptiste Tripon in 1837, based on Beaumesnil's notes.
- Recherches générales sur les antiquités et monuments de la France, avec les diverses traditions, numerous notebooks (...) in the collections of the Institut de France according to Raymond Chevallier (Note: Chevallier seems to repeat what he must have read somewhere, without specifying the source, as he provides no details on the genealogy or the location of the notebooks in question: “His drawing notebooks were sent to the Academy from 1779 to 1784: 7 concern ancient monuments of Limoges. Other drawings illustrate Agen, Bourbon-l’Archambault (the baths), Bourbon-Lancy, Clermont-Ferrand (the Temple of Vasso), Eauze (a sarcophagus), Laréole, Lectoure, Lezoux (ceramics), Néris-les-Bains, Périgueux (the Vésone Tower, the gates, the amphitheater — contemporary state and reconstruction), Poitiers (the amphitheater), Uzès…” (Chevallier 1999, p. 143).) (no description or reference number, and probably not seen) — a set of notebooks that cannot be found in any case.

=== At the Poitiers Municipal Library (François Mitterrand Media Library) ===
- Notes, croquis, essais, inscriptions... [pour la plupart de la main de Beaumesnil, mis au net dans le Ms 547], 122 pl. (Bibliothèque de Poitiers)
- Monuments du Poitou: plans, vues, détails, inscriptions [d'après les croquis de Beaumesnil], 3 vol., 378 pl. (Bibliothèque de Poitiers)
- Antiquités de la ville de Poitiers, province de Poictou et Aquitaine, origine de ses peuples, probable et fabuleuse avec un extrait chronologique des souverains qui ont occupé le Poitou jusqu'à présent
- Les trois monuments dits les Trois-Piliers: dessins et texte, par Beauménil (1750)
- Scattered copies, under various call numbers at the Poitiers Library:
  - Raymond Bourdier, Vestiges du château de Poitiers, 1921
  - Restes du château de Poitiers
  - Bélisaire Ledain (1832–1897), Epitaphes de Civaux
  - Bélisaire Ledain, Modillons de l'octogone de Montmorillon
  - Camille-Léopold Lahaire, Ruines des Trois-Piliers, c. 1896
  - Ruines des Arènes de Poitiers
  - Alexandre Garnier (or Gustave Alexandre Garnier, 1834–1892?), Dragon de Poitiers dit la "Grand' Goule", c. 1890
  - Bélisaire Ledain, Les Trois Piliers
  - Bélisaire Ledain, Tombeaux et épitaphes de Civaux
  - Bélisaire Ledain, Chapiteaux de Saint-Hilaire le Grand
  - Alain Maulny (Service de l'Inventaire), Statue de Constantin avec épitaphe et armoiries, photographies, c. 1970

=== At the Lot-et-Garonne Departmental Archives ===
- Antiquités de la ville d'Agen, 1767, 47 pages, published in 2017 (Departmental Archives of Lot-et-Garonne, reference 35 J 30; described in Saint-Amans 1812; (Note: Saint-Amans: some plates of Essai sur les antiquités du département de Lot-et-Garonne (Agen, 1859) may have been inspired by Beaumesnil's work.) part of the Beaumesnil estate, acquired by the Academy of Agen in 1808 (Note: Cote 35 J 31 of the Departmental Archives of Lot-et-Garonne contains "correspondence regarding the ownership of this manuscript (1807–1861)." Louis Guibert seems unaware of this sale, as he expresses surprise at the manuscript's presence in Agen.) following the death of de Lépine's son, not returned by Saint-Amans, still untraceable by Lauzun in 1900, deposited in the departmental archives in 1977, retrieved by the Academy in 2017).

=== At the Dordogne Departmental Archives ===
- Recueil de documents et d'extraits fait [en 1789] par l'abbé Lespine, comprenant notamment les notes de Beaumesnil sur les "Antiquités de Périgueux [recueillies en l’année 1763, augmentées de quelques autres à un séjour que j’y fis en 1772]" (Fol. 6–25), avec des dessins et des planches au lavis de Bardon, et des dessins en couleur de Wlgrin de Taillefer sur les principaux monuments de Vésone au I^{er} siècle (Fol. 58 [p. 89]) et sur la "Restauration de la cathédrale de Périgueux et des quartiers qui l'avoisinent" (Fol. 59 [p. 90]), 59 leaves in 90 pages, 387 × 255 mm (Departmental Archives of Dordogne / Digital Library of Périgord, donation of Abbé Audierne [donated by M. de Bastard, according to Espérandieu], reference 24. Ms 29 [archive] [BNP access archive]); brief description of the Taillefer collection in Espérandieu 1893, pp. 110–112; comments on Beaumesnil's notebook in Lacombe 1985, pp. 255–257 and 263, and in François Michel 1993, pp. 20–23 [archive]; the notebook was found at the end of the 18th century by Lespine in the former archives of Minister Bertin, then acquired along with other documents of the abbé and bound into the collection in the 1820s by de Taillefer; (Note: Lacombe 1985, p. 11: It was probably during these exchanges of correspondence [with all the antiquarians of his time] that Taillefer recovered or purchased copies of Beaumesnil's original drawings made at the request of Minister Bertin, and the copy, made in 1789 in Paris by Abbé Lespine, of the parts concerning Périgord in the memoirs of the actor-archaeologist. He had them bound in the 1820s and titled Antiquities of Périgueux. This manuscript had been discovered by Abbé Lespine in a box of papers from the cabinet of the late Mr. de Bertin, minister and secretary of state.) this notebook is a possible duplicate by Beaumesnil, (Note: Espérandieu seems to agree.) or a copy (by an unknown author, made at the request of Minister Bertin) of Notebook 1 of reference C 80 at the Archives of the Académie des inscriptions et belles-lettres.

=== At the Haute-Vienne Departmental Archives ===
- Album called the Atlas des antiquités de la Haute-Vienne, containing copies of Beaumesnil's drawings, made between 1821 and 1837 by Charles-Nicolas Allou, recomposed by Maurice Ardant after the album was donated by Allou's widow to the Société archéologique et historique du Limousin in 1857, 21 folio plates out of 26 are preserved (Departmental Archives of Haute-Vienne, reference 66 Fi 7; description in Leroux 1888, pp. 216–217, reviewed in 2016 by Muriel Souchet, Departmental Archives).
- Antiquités limousines. Cahier de notes et croquis archéologiques attribués à Beaumesnil, loaned by Mr. Edmond Panet, 1969 (Note: The Cahier de notes et croquis archéologiques attribués à Beaumesnil, des Antiquités limousines, may correspond to the Environs of Limoges (format 305 × 201 mm), a notebook in which, according to Guibert (1900), “are found sketches of numerous monuments, remains of buildings, fragments of sculpture, and various relics visible in the last century at Condat, Ambazac, Saint-Léonard, Glanges, Pierrebuffière, Saint-Hilaire-Bonneval, Boisseuil, Solignac, Bellac and its surroundings, Tulle, Naves, Tinlighac, Ussel, Felletin, Aubusson, Les Ternes, Chénérailles, Ahun, etc. Tripon drew extensively from this collection,” at Nivel-Fontaubert in 1900. This latter notebook may contain the plates consulted by Espérandieu, “28 plates of the Nivet-Fontaubert collection,” in 1891 (otherwise at the Bibliothèque francophone multimédia de Limoges?). Espérandieu specifies that it is not part of the notebooks seen by Allou.) (Departmental Archives of Haute-Vienne, microfilm reference 1 Mi 225, 1 roll, 2.50 m, negative).
- Antiquités de la ville de Limoges, loaned by Mrs. du Boucheron (Beynac), 1957 (Departmental Archives of Haute-Vienne, microfilm reference 1 Mi 79, 4 strips, 0.90 m, negative).

=== Lost, scattered, or misplaced sets (in addition to that of the Institute) ===
- The four notebooks on Limoges consulted in 1821 by Allou and partially reconstructed by Espérandieu.
- The "very voluminous memoirs" noted by Prosper Mérimée in 1838, then kept at the Hôtel-de-Ville of Limoges. Probably the same set as that seen by Allou.
- The Nivet-Fontaubert collection, consulted among others by Espérandieu and briefly described by Guibert (1900), dispersed at the beginning of the 20th century and probably in private collections.
- "Sheet of paper measuring 340 mm by 198, […] of sketches that the author of the Historique monumental had before his eyes, only those that make up plates I and II, plus part of plate III of Tripon’s special series, remain," at Nivel-Fontaubert in 1900.
- "Mr. Mariaux possesses fairly voluminous memoirs of our artist on Greek and Roman archaeology, the arts, customs, institutions; chronological tables, research on the torture of the cross among various peoples, notes on Asia Minor, a copy of Discours de la religion des anciens Romains by the noble lord Guillaume du Choul, plus a number of loose sheets — all adorned with drawings, some very curious," at Paul Mariaux in 1900.
- "Batch of notes and drawings from Beaumesnil’s papers. [...] Gives some personal indications about our archaeologist, and notably mentions the journey to Egypt previously discussed," at Léonce Pichonnier in 1900.
- Copies made before 1837 by Jean-Baptiste Tripon based on the Ruffin collection (possibly at the Departmental Archives of Haute-Vienne or in the Lenoir collection of the Cabinet des Estampes at the BnF).
- Mémoire sur Chassenon, consulted by Jean-Hippolyte Michon before 1844 – without description or location.
- Drawings and papers at Mr. de Lagoy and in Aix (noted by Edmond Le Blant in 1856, and other papers by Mr. Jullian).

== See also ==
- History of theatre

== Bibliography ==
=== Regional studies ===
==== Indre-et-Loire, Vendée, Deux-Sèvres, Vienne, Charente-Maritime, Charente ====
- Vouhé, Grégory (2016). "Pierre de Beauménil. Antiquaire des Lumières" [Pierre de Beauménil. Antiquarian of the Enlightenment]. L'Actualité Poitou-Charentes (in French) (113).
- Lelong, Charles (1988). "Documents sur la Touraine à l'époque gallo-romaine: les dessins de Beaumesnil (1784)" [Documents on Touraine in the Gallo-Roman period: the drawings of Beaumesnil (1784)]. Bulletin de la Société archéologique de Touraine (in French): 87–89.
- Mauny, Raymond (1980). "Contribution à l'étude des « Greniers et silos Gastignon » à Amboise (soi-disant greniers de César)" [Contribution to the study of the “Gastignon granaries and silos” in Amboise (supposedly Caesar's granaries)]. Bulletin de la Société archéologique de Touraine (in French). XXXIX: 450–452. ISSN 1153-2521.
- Espérandieu, Émile (1888). Épigraphie romaine du Poitou et de la Saintonge [Roman epigraphy of Poitou and Saintonge] (in French). Vol. 1. Melle. pp. 328–329.
- Michon, Jean-Hippolyte (1844). Statistique monumentale de la Charente. Melle, E. Lacuve. pp. 19 et seq.
- Millin, Aubin Louis (1811). Voyage dans les départemens du midi de la France [Traveling through the southern departments of France] (in French). Vol. 4. p. 748.

==== Saône-et-Loire ====
- Le Blant, Edmond (1856). Inscriptions chrétiennes de la Gaule antérieures au VIIIe siècle [Christian inscriptions in Gaul prior to the 8th century] (in French). Vol. 1. p. 25.
- Martin, Arthur (1856). Mélanges d'archéologie, d'histoire et de littérature [A blend of archaeology, history, and literature] (in French). Vol. 4. p. 115.

==== Haute-Vienne ====
- Vergnolle, Éliane (2006). "L'abbatiale romane: bilan documentaire" [The Romanesque abbey church: documentary review]. Saint-Martial de Limoges: ambition politique et production culturelle: Xe – XIIIe siècles: actes du colloque tenu à Poitiers et Limoges du 26 au 28 mai 2005 [Saint-Martial de Limoges: political ambition and cultural production: 10th–13th centuries: proceedings of the symposium held in Poitiers and Limoges from May 26 to 28, 2005] (in French). Presses Univ. Limoges. pp. 201–203. ISBN 9782842874001.
- Legros, Martial (1995). Continuation de l'abrégé des annales du Limousin: années 1770 à 1790 [Continuation of the summary of the annals of Limousin: 1770 to 1790] (in French). p. 327.
- Guibert, Louis (1900). "Anciens dessins des monuments de Limoges" [Old drawings of monuments in Limoges]. Bulletin de la Société archéologique et historique du Limousin (in French). 49: 4–87.
- Espérandieu, Émile (1891). Inscriptions de la cité des Lemovices [Inscriptions from the city of the Lemovices] (in French). pp. 233–280, 336.
- Leroux, Alfred (1890). "Notice sur les archives de M. Nivet-Fontaubert" [Note on the archives of Mr. Nivet-Fontaubert]. Bulletin de la Société archéologique et historique du Limousin (in French). 39: 564–566.
- Arbellot, François (1888). "L'abbé Vitrac: notice biographique et bibliographique" [Abbé Vitrac: biographical and bibliographical note]. Bulletin de la Société archéologique et historique du Limousin (in French). 36: 7.
- Ducourtieux, Paul (1883). "Limoges d'après ses anciens plans" [Limoges according to its old plans]. Bulletin de la Société archéologique et historique du Limousin (in French). 31: 139–140.
- Guibert, Louis (1881). "Anciens registres des paroisses de Limoges" [Old parish registers of Limoges]. Bulletin de la Société archéologique et historique du Limousin (in French). 29: 73–124, 96–97.
- Lecler, André (1869). "Beaumesnil". Bulletin de la Société archéologique et historique du Limousin (in French). 19: 27–30.
- Mérimée, Prosper (1838). Notes d'un voyage en Auvergne [Notes from a trip to Auvergne] (in French). pp. 100–102.
- Tripon, Jean-Baptisle (1837). Historique monumental de l'ancienne province du Limousin [Monumental history of the former province of Limousin] (in French). Vol. 2. Ed. de la Tour Gile. ISBN 2878023609.
- Allou, Charles-Nicolas (1821). Description des monumens des différens ages, observés dans le département de la Haute-Vienne: avec un précis des annales de ce pays [Description of monuments from different periods observed in the Haute-Vienne department, with a summary of the annals of this region.] (in French). pp. xii et sq.
- Ardant, Maurice (1857). "Explication des planches formant l'Atlas des antiquités de la Hte-Vienne" [Explanation of the plates forming the Atlas of Antiquities of the Haute-Vienne]. Bulletin de la Société archéologique et historique du Limousin (in French). 7: 80–88.
- Leroux, Alfred (1888). "La bibliothèque de la Société archéologique et historique du Limousin" [The library of the Limousin Archaeological and Historical Society]. Bulletin de la Société archéologique et historique du Limousin (in French). 36: 216–217.
- Martin, Paul Esprit Marie Joseph (1812). "Rapport" [Report]. Société d'agriculture, des sciences et des arts du département de la Haute-Vienne (in French): 64–66.
- Duroux, Jacques (1811). Essai historique sur la Sénatorerie de Limoges [Historical essay on the Senatorial Office of Limoges] (in French). p. 124.

==== Gironde ====
- Jullian, Camille (1890). Inscriptions romaines de Bordeaux [Roman inscriptions in Bordeaux] (in French). Vol. 2. pp. 254–258.

==== Dordogne ====
- Michel, François (1993). "Le cahier de dessins de Pierre Beaumesnil" [Pierre Beaumesnil's sketchbook]. Mémoire de la Dordogne (in French). 2: 20–23. ISSN 1241-2228.
- Blanchet, Adrien (1932). "Le troisième recueil de Beaumesnil sur des antiquités de Périgueux (1784)" [Beaumesnil's third collection on the antiquities of Périgueux (1784)]. Journal des savants [Journal of Scholars] (in French). Vol. 4. pp. 171–175. doi:10.3406/jds.1932.6034.
- Espérandieu, Émile (1893). Musée de Périgueux. Inscriptions antiques [Périgueux Museum. Ancient inscriptions] (in French). pp. 113–114.
  - Contains a note from Abbé de Lespine about a manuscript, unseen by Espérandieu, on the antiquities of Périgueux: "Drawings and plans, on several sheets, of ancient monuments and inscriptions found in Périgueux, accompanied by observations and explanations, by M. de Beaumesnil, correspondent of the Académie des Inscriptions et Belles-Lettres [Archives of the Académie des Inscriptions et Belles-Lettres, reference C 80, notebooks 1 and 2?]. They are kept in the academy's repository at the Louvre, where Mr. Dacier, permanent secretary of the academy, showed them to me in 1789. Mr. de Bertin, minister and secretary of state, had a copy made [Departmental Archives of the Dordogne, reference number 24. Ms 29?]. I had already seen the sketch at the author's home in Limoges in 178... (sic)"
- Wlgrin de Taillefer, Henry (1821). Antiquités de Vésone, cité gauloise, remplacée par la ville actuelle de Périgueux, ou Description des monumens religieux, civils et militaires de cette antique cité et de son territoire. Précédée d'un essai sur les Gaulois [Antiquities of Vésone, a Gallic city replaced by the present-day town of Périgueux, or Description of the religious, civil, and military monuments of this ancient city and its territory. Preceded by an essay on the Gauls.] (in French). Vol. 1. p. 280.

==== Corrèze ====
- Lemaître, Jean-Loup (1996). "Une nouvelle inscription latine d'Ussel" [A new Latin inscription from Ussel]. Bulletin de la Société Nationale des Antiquaires de France (in French). 1994: 209–218. doi:10.3406/bsnaf.1996.11494.
- Guibert, Louis (1884). "Le Bénédictin dom Col en Limousin (Suite et fin)" [The Benedictine monk Dom Col in Limousin (continued and concluded)]. Bulletin de la Société des lettres, sciences et arts de la Corrèze (in French). 6: 414–417.

==== Lot-et-Garonne ====
- Collectif (2017). Antiquités de la ville d'Agen: le manuscrit de Pierre de Beaumesnil, reproduction et commentaires [Antiquities of the city of Agen: the manuscript of Pierre de Beaumesnil, reproduction and commentary] (in French). Recueil des travaux de l'Académie d'Agen. p. 280. ISSN 2550-9004.
- Lauzun, Philippe (1900). La Société académique d'Agen (1776-1900) [The Academic Society of Agen (1776–1900)] (in French). pp. 88–90.
- Chaudruc, Jean-César-Marie-Alexandre; de Saint-Amans, Jean-Florimond (1818). "Antiquités d'Agen" [Antiques of Agen]. Annales encyclopédiques: bibliothèque illustrée des lettres, des arts et des sciences [Encyclopedic Annals: Illustrated Library of Literature, Arts, and Sciences] (in French). Vol. 4. Paris: Bureau des annales encyclopédiques. pp. 324–325.

"His notes, which he sent to the Intendant of the Généralité of Limoges, were transmitted by this magistrate to the Ministry in Paris. They now exist in the cartons of the Bibliothèque Mazarine, at the Palais des Beaux-Arts." Aubin Louis Millin (member of the Académie des Inscriptions et Belles-Lettres since 1804) adds in a footnote that "in the Bibliothèque Mazarine, only what had been delivered to the library of the Académie des Belles-Lettres by Beaumesnil, when she granted him a pension of 400 francs, exists. But there are still a large number of others, of which I would have acquired if there were a page or figure of any use. It is a huge accumulation of nonsense in the text, of figures disguised and adapted to the ridiculous fancy of this poor actor, who saw phalluses and hermetic signs everywhere." Chaudruc & de Saint-Amans, p. 324, regarding Beaumesnil's manuscript on the antiquities of Agen, collected and drawn around 1772.

- de Saint-Amans, Jean-Florimond (1812). "Rapport sur un manuscrit intitulé: Antiquités de la ville d'Agen [de Dumesnil], etc" [Report on a manuscript entitled: Antiquities of the City of Agen [by Dumesnil], etc.]. Recueil des travaux de la Société d'agriculture, sciences et arts d'Agen (in French). 2: 243–272.
- Magen, Adolphe (1857). "Appendice n° 1". Ibid (in French). 8: 148–149.

==== Aveyron ====
- Boube, Jean (1958). "Les Sarcophages Paléochrétiens de Rodez" [The Early Christian Sarcophagi of Rodez]. Pallas (in French). 6 (3): 79–111, 83–85. doi:10.3406/palla.1958.948.
- Couderc, Camille (1891). "Note sur des calques de dessins de Beauméni représentant des sarcophages trouvés à Rodez" [Note on Beauméni's drawings depicting sarcophagi found in Rodez]. Mémoires de la Société des lettres, sciences et arts de l'Aveyron (in French). 14: 105–112.

==== Bouches-du-Rhône ====
- Constans, Léopold-Albert (1921). Arles antique [Ancient Arles] (in French). pp. 362–363.

=== General studies ===
- Arquié-Bruley, Françoise (1998). "L'omniscient abbé de Tersan (Charles-Philippe Campion de Tersan, 1737–1819)" [The omniscient abbot of Tersan (Charles-Philippe Campion de Tersan, 1737–1819)]. Bulletin de la Société Nationale des Antiquaires de France (in French): 129–130.
- Chevallier, Raymond (1999). "Les antiquités d'Aquitaine vues par les anciens voyageurs (guides et récits)" [The antiquities of Aquitaine as seen by travelers of old (guides and accounts)]. Bulletin de l'Association Guillaume-Budé (in French). 1: 143. doi:10.3406/bude.1999.1944.
- Pinon, Pierre (1998). "Beaumesnil et Grignon, le dessin et la fouille" [Beaumesnil and Grignon, the drawing and the excavation]. La fascination de l'Antique, 1700-1770. Rome découverte, Rome inventée (in French).
- Pinon, Pierre (1993). "Archéologues des Lumières: Pierre Beaumesnil et Pierre-Clément Grignon" [Archaeologists of the Enlightenment: Pierre Beaumesnil and Pierre-Clément Grignon]. Caesarodunum (in French). 27: 109–135. ISSN 0248-8388.
- Les pratiques de l'archéologie et les circonstances des découvertes (XVIIe siècle-milieu du XIXe siècle) [Archaeological practices and circumstances of discoveries (17th century to mid-19th century)] (Video) (in French). La fabrique de l'archéologie en France [colloque à l'Auditorium de la galerie Colbert de l'INHA. 2008.
- de Montclos, Jean-Marie Pérouse (1983). "De nova stella anni 1784" [From nova stella, year 1784]. Revue de l'art (in French). 58–59: 80–81.
- Dictionnaire de biographie française [Dictionary of French Biography] (in French). Paris: Beaumesnil (Pierre). 1951.
- Huard, Georges (1951). Etat sommaire de l'acquisition André Lenoir (livres, gravures, dessins, manuscrits, etc., ayant appartenu à Alexandre, Albert, Alfred Lenoir et à Beaumesnil [Summary of the André Lenoir acquisition (books, engravings, drawings, manuscripts, etc., having belonged to Alexandre, Albert, Alfred Lenoir, and Beaumesnil)] (in French).
- La grande encyclopédie [The Great Encyclopedia] (in French). Paris: Beaumesnil (Pierre). 1888. p. 1041.
- Le Blant, Edmond (1886). Les sarcophages chrétiens de la Gaule [Christian sarcophagi in Gaul] (in French).
- Lenoir, Albert (1885). "Un acteur archéologue, Beaumenil" [An actor archaeologist, Beaumenil]. Le Magasin Pittoresque (in French). 53: 356–358.
- Michaud, Louis-Gabriel (1843). "Beaumesnil (Pierre)". Biographie universelle ancienne et moderne [Ancient and Modern Universal Biography] (in French). Vol. 3: Bamboche-Bérénice (2nd ed.). p. 407.
