= Castelculier =

- Commune
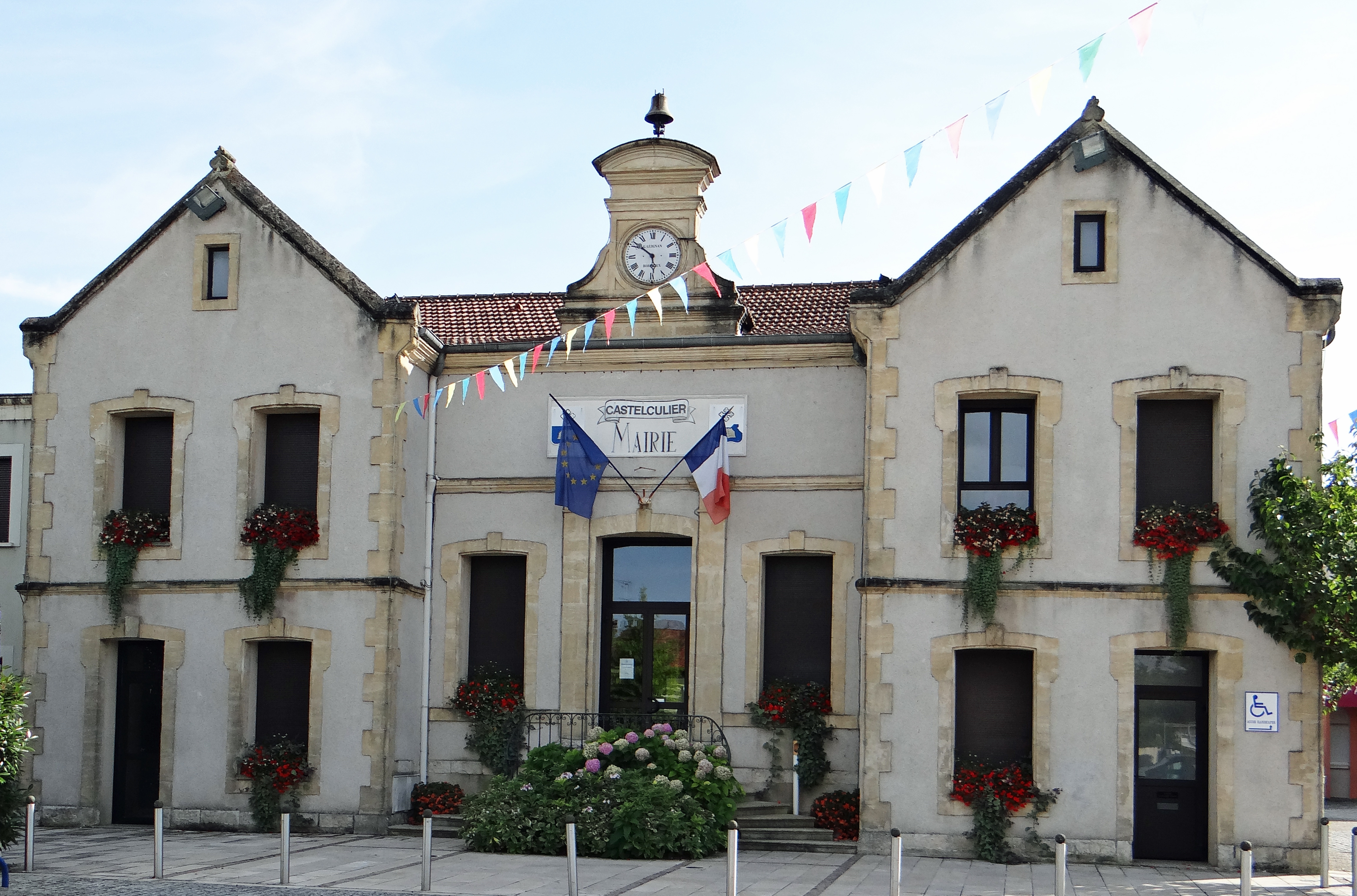

- Coat of arms
- Location of Castelculier
- Location within France Location within Nouvelle-Aquitaine
- Coordinates: 44°10′32″N 0°41′37″E
- Country: France
- Region: Nouvelle-Aquitaine
- Department: Lot-et-Garonne
- Arrondissement: Agen
- Canton: Le Sud-Est agenais
- Intercommunality: Agglomération d'Agen

Government
  - Mayor (2026–32): Marie-Pierre Battistuzzi
- Area^{1}: 14.95 km^{2} (5.77 sq mi)
- Elevation: 57 m (187 ft)
- Highest elevation: 177 m (581 ft)
- Lowest elevation: 49 m (161 ft)
- Population (2023): 2,382
  - Density: 159.3/km^{2} (412.7/sq mi)
- Time zone: UTC+01:00 (CET)
  - Summer (DST): UTC+02:00 (CEST)
- INSEE/Postal code: 47051 /47240
- ^{1} French Land Register data, which excludes lakes, ponds, glaciers > 1 km^{2} (0.386 sq mi or 247 acres) and river estuaries.

Castelculier (French pronunciation: [kastɛlkylje]; Languedocien: Castelculhèr) is a commune in the Lot-et-Garonne department in south-western France.

== History ==
The name of the village comes from the medieval fortress known as Chasteau Cullier. This castle was destroyed by the duke of Épernon in 1633 by order of Louis XIII, king of France.

== Geography ==
The Séoune forms most of the commune's south-eastern border.

== Population ==
Historical population
Year	Pop.	±% p.a.
1968	815	—
1975	1,005	+3.04%
1982	1,233	+2.96%
1990	1,597	+3.29%
1999	1,697	+0.68%
2007	2,194	+3.26%
2012	2,354	+1.42%
2017	2,375	+0.18%
2023	2,382	+0.05%
Source: INSEE

== Administration ==
List of mayors since 1791 :

- 1791
  - Hybre
- 1801-1802
  - Farrouilh
- 1803
  - Hybres
- 1804
  - Pradié
- 1805-1807
  - Hybres
- 1807-1810
  - N. A. Denis
- 1810-1822
  - V. Besse
- 1822-1840
  - Laroche
- 1841-1851
  - Boudon de Saint-Amans
- 1852-1859
  - Roche
- 1860-1870
  - Leglise
- 1871
  - Tourrette
- 1872-1878
  - Leglise
- 1879-1882
  - Dumas
- 1882-1885
  - Pontou
- 1885-1897
  - Maleze
- 1897-1913
  - Pontou
- 1913-1926
  - Marguerite
- 1926-1936
  - Silvestre
- 1936-1939
  - Asté
- 1940-1944
  - R. Asté
- 1945-1946
  - H. Pinède
- 1947-1965
  - René Salon
- 1966-1983
  - Louis Asté
- 1983-2014
  - Marc Boueilh
- 2014-2026
  - Olivier Grima
- 2026-
  - Marie-Pierre Battistuzzi

The town hall is located in the village of Grandfonds.

== Lordship of Castelculier ==
List of the lords of Castelculier

- 1419
  - Nompar of Caumont

== Main sights ==
- Church of Saint-Amans

== Personalities ==
- Jean Florimond Boudon de Saint-Amans
- Jean-Baptiste Alexandre Damaze de Chaudordy, French diplomat

== See also ==
- Communes of the Lot-et-Garonne department
