= Maria Anna Victoria of Bavaria =

Dauphine of France (1660–1690)

- Dauphine of France
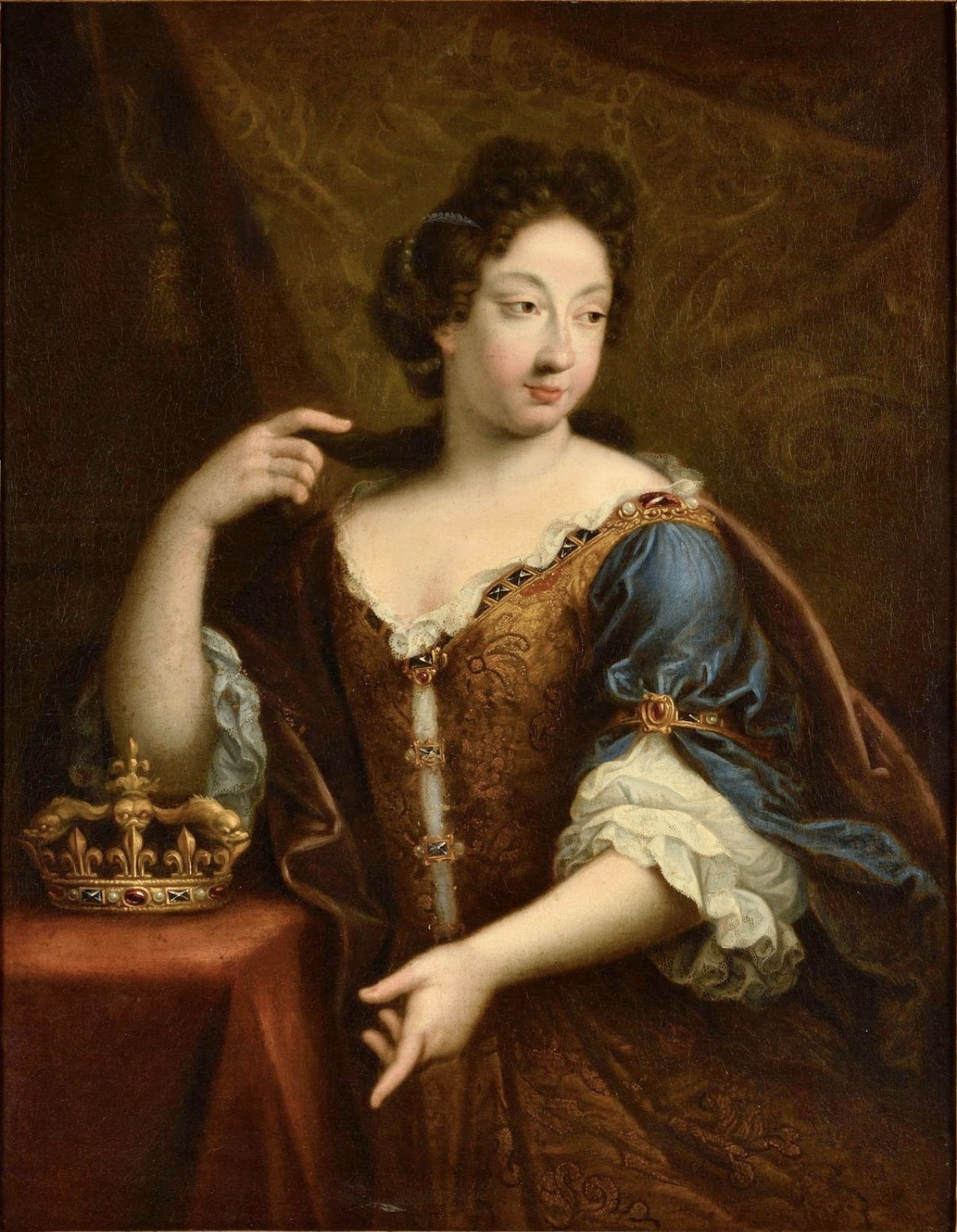
- Born: 28 November 1660; Munich, Bavaria
- Died: 20 April 1690 (aged 29); Palace of Versailles, France
- Burial: Royal Basilica of Saint Denis
- Spouse: Louis, Grand Dauphin (m. 1680)
- Issue: Louis, Dauphin of France; Philip V of Spain; Charles, Duke of Berry
Names
- Maria Anna Christine Victoria
- House: Wittelsbach
- Father: Ferdinand Maria, Elector of Bavaria
- Mother: Princess Henriette Adelaide of Savoy

Maria Anna Christine Victoria of Bavaria (French: Marie Anne Victoire; 28 November 1660 – 20 April 1690) was Dauphine of France by marriage to Louis, Grand Dauphin, son and heir of Louis XIV. She was known as la Grande Dauphine. The Dauphine was regarded a "pathetic" figure at the court of France, isolated and unappreciated due to the perception that she was dull, unattractive and sickly. She is the ancestor of all Spanish monarchs following her son Philip V, except for Joseph Bonaparte.

== Life ==
=== Early life ===
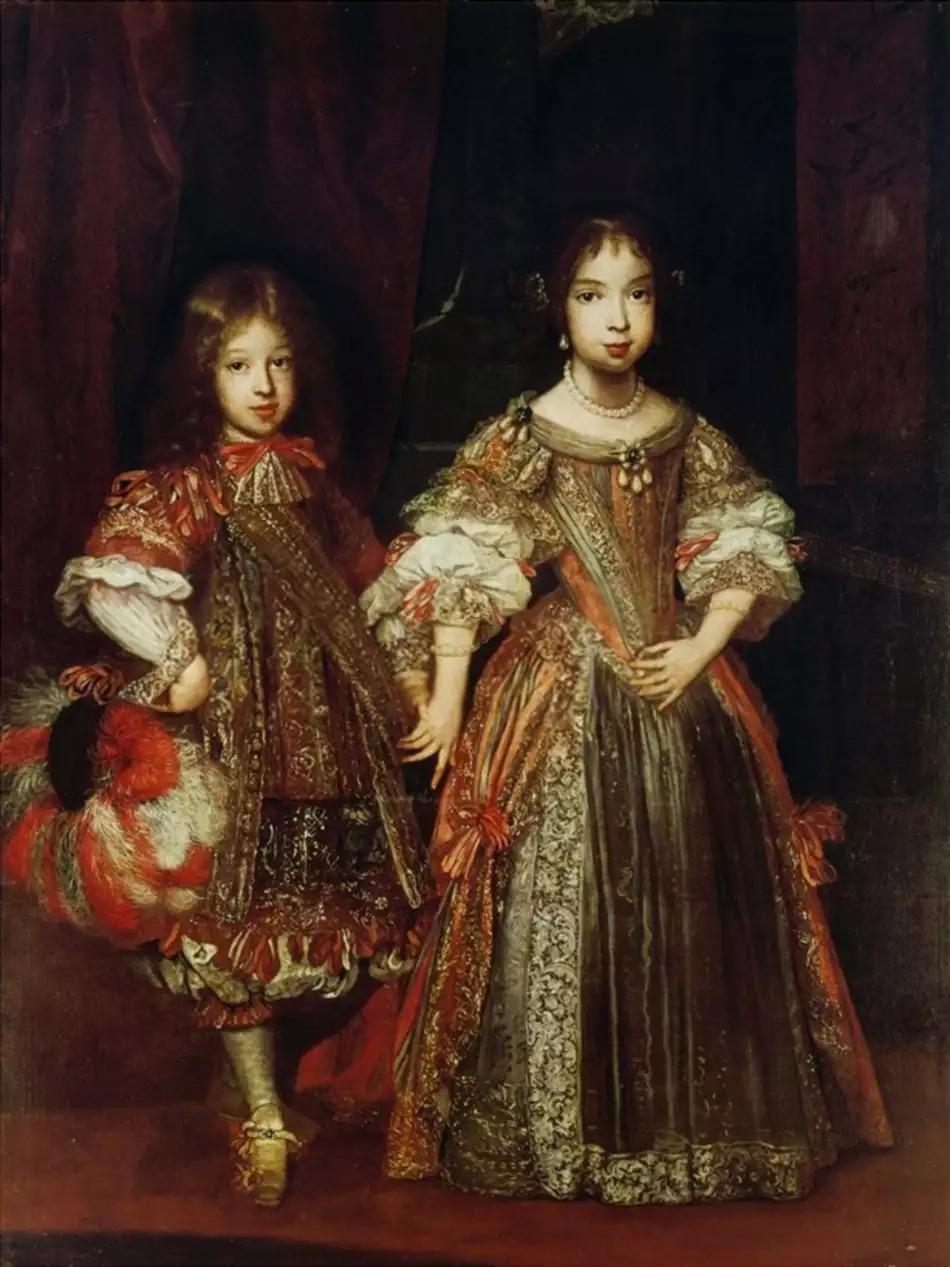
Maria Anna Victoria with her brother Maximilian II Emanuel, c. 1668

Maria Anna was the eldest daughter of Ferdinand Maria, Elector of Bavaria and his wife Princess Henriette Adelaide of Savoy. Her maternal grandparents were Victor Amadeus I, Duke of Savoy and Christine Marie of France, the second daughter of Henry IV of France and Marie de' Medici, thus her husband the dauphin was her second cousin.

Born in Munich, capital of the Electorate of Bavaria, Maria Anna was betrothed to the dauphin of France in 1668, at the age of eight, and was carefully educated to fulfill that role. Besides her native language of German, she was taught to speak French, Italian and Latin. She was said to have looked forward to the fate of becoming dauphine of France. Maria Anna was very close to her mother, who died in 1676. Her siblings included Violante of Bavaria, future wife of Ferdinando de' Medici as well as the future Elector of Bavaria, Maximilian II Emanuel.

=== Dauphine ===
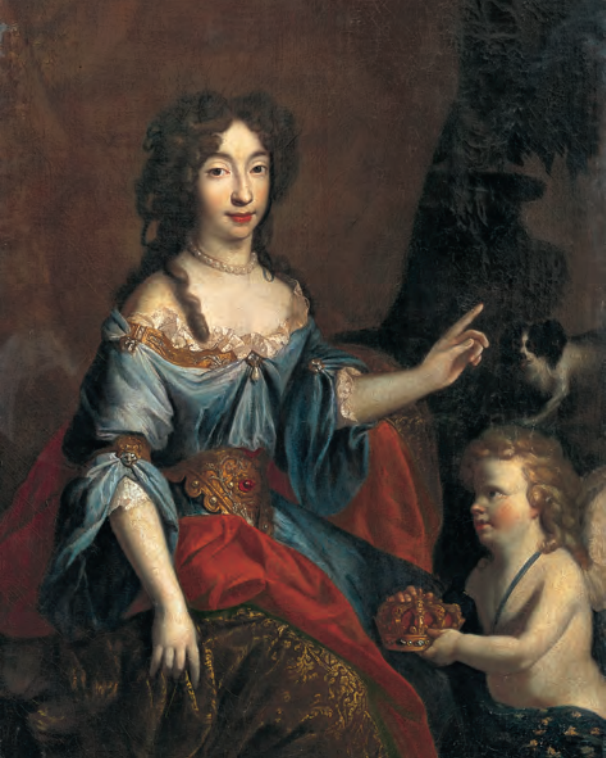
Princess Maria Anna Victoria of Bavaria being handed the crown of the dauphine in 1680, prior to her marriage

Prior to her marriage to the dauphin, there was a proxy ceremony in Munich on 28 January 1680; the couple would meet for the first time on 7 March 1680 in Châlons-sur-Marne. She was the first dauphine of France since Mary, Queen of Scots, married Francis II of France in 1558.

Upon her marriage, Maria Anna took on the rank of her husband as a Fille de France (Daughter of France); this meant that she was entitled to the style "Royal Highness" and the form of address Madame la Dauphine.

When she first arrived in France, Maria Anna made a favorable impression with her good French. When she entered Strasbourg, she was addressed in German, but interrupted the greeting by saying, "Gentlemen, I speak French!" The impression of her appearance, however, was not as good, and she was called "terribly ugly". Others said that although she may not have been beautiful, she did have personal charm.

As soon as she married the dauphin, Maria Anna was the second most important woman at court after her mother-in-law, Queen Maria Theresa, consort of King Louis XIV. When the queen died in July 1683, Maria Anna ranked as the most prominent female at court and was given the apartments of the late queen. The king expected her to perform the functions of the first lady at court, but her ill health made it very difficult for her to carry out her duties. The king was completely unsympathetic to her situation and accused her falsely of hypochondria.

Her husband took mistresses, and she lived an isolated life in her apartments, where she spoke with her friend and confidant Barbara Bessola in German, a language her husband could not understand. She was close to a fellow German – and the second Wittelsbach – at court, Elizabeth Charlotte of the Palatinate, the wife of the king's younger brother Philippe. She was said to be depressed having to live at a court where beauty was so much prized, not being beautiful herself.

Elizabeth Charlotte, Madame Palatine said in her letters that Madame de Maintenon did not wish for the Dauphine to gain influence at court, and that she bribed Barbara Bessola to keep her isolated from society, while in parallel her lady-in-waiting Marguerite de Montchevreuil arranged for the Dauphine's maids-of-honours (Marie-Armande de Rambures and Louise-Victoire de La Force) to keep the Dauphin entertained and become his lovers.

=== Death ===
She died in 1690. An autopsy revealed a multitude of internal disorders that completely vindicated her complaints of chronic and severe illness.

Maria Anna was buried at the Royal Basilica of Saint Denis.

== Issue ==
Maria Anna had three children:

- Louis de France (16 August 1682 – 18 February 1712), Duke of Burgundy and later Dauphin of France; married his second cousin Princess Maria Adelaide of Savoy; they were the parents of Louis XV of France;
- Philippe de France (19 December 1683 – 9 July 1746), Duke of Anjou, later King of Spain; married his second cousin Princess Maria Luisa Gabriella of Savoy and had issue; married again Elisabeth Farnese and had issue. He was the first Bourbon king of Spain and the ancestor of every subsequent monarch of that country, except for Joseph Bonaparte;
- Charles de France (31 July 1686 – 5 May 1714), Duke of Berry, Alençon, and Angoulême, Count of Ponthieu; married his first cousin Marie Louise Élisabeth d'Orléans and had issue, but none survived over a year.

== Ancestors ==
Ancestors of Maria Anna Victoria of Bavaria

8. William V, Duke of Bavaria
4. Maximilian I, Elector of Bavaria
9. Renata of Lorraine
2. Ferdinand Maria, Elector of Bavaria
10. Ferdinand II, Holy Roman Emperor
5. Maria Anna of Austria
11. Maria Anna of Bavaria
1. Maria Anna Victoria of Bavaria
12. Charles Emmanuel I, Duke of Savoy
6. Victor Amadeus I, Duke of Savoy
13. Catalina Micaela of Spain
3. Henriette Adelaide of Savoy
14. Henry IV of France
7. Christine of France
15. Marie de' Medici
