= Marguerite de Montchevreuil =

French courtier

- Born: Marguerite Boucher d'Orsay; 1633; Saint-Jean-en-Grève, Paris, France
- Died: 25 October 1699 (aged 65–66); Versailles, France
- Other names: Marquise de Montchevreuil, Madame de Montchevreuil
- Occupation: Courtier
- Known for: Confidante of Madame de Maintenon; governess to Louis Alexandre, Count of Toulouse and Françoise Marie de Bourbon
- Spouse(s): Henri de Mornay, marquis de Montchevreuil

Marguerite de Montchevreuil (also called Marquise de Montchevreuil and Madame de Montchevreuil), née Boucher d'Orsay (1633 – 25 October 1699) was a French courtier. She was a governess of Louis Alexandre, Count of Toulouse and Françoise Marie de Bourbon, and a lady-in-waiting of Maria Anna Victoria of Bavaria. She was a friend and confidante of the morganatic wife of King Louis XIV, Madame de Maintenon, and had some influence at court.

== Life and career ==
She was born to Charles Boucher d'Orsay, seigneur d'Orsay, and Marguerite Bourlon, and married Henri de Mornay, marquis de Montchevreuil (1623–1706), in 1653.

Marguerite de Montchevreuil befriended Madame de Maintenon early on. Madame de Monchevreuil, Madame de Colbert, and Madame de Jussac were employed to take care of the children of king Louis XIV and Madame de Montespan, Louis Alexandre, Count of Toulouse and Françoise Marie de Bourbon, under Mme. de Maintenon's supervision.

Marguerite de Montchevreuil is named as one of the seven wittnesses of the secret wedding between the king and Madame de Maintenon in 1684. As the favorite confidant and personal friend of the kings wife, Montchevreuil came to excert some influence at court as the "henchwoman" of Madame de Maintenon. She was described as pious and unattractive, and reportedly acted as a spy for Madame de Maintenon, keeping herself informed about the private affairs of the members of the court. As such, she played an important role in the growing moralism which influenced the French royal court after Louis XIV had married the strictly religious Madame de Maintenon.

In 1679, she was appointed to the Household of the new Dauphine Maria Anna Victoria of Bavaria: she was appointed to the post of governess of the Dauphines maids-of-honour, serving under the Première dame d'honneur Anne de Richelieu and the Dame d'atour Madeleine de Laval-Bois-Dauphin.

Elizabeth Charlotte, Madame Palatine claimed in her letters that Madame de Maintenon did not wish the Dauphine to play any great role at court, slandered her against the king and bribed Barbara Bessola to isolate her. Elizabeth Charlotte claimed that Marguerite de Montchevreuil had been engaged by Maintenon to estrange the Dauphine and her spouse, quote:

"That lady had also another creature in the Dauphine's household: this was Madame de Montchevreuil, the gouvernante of the Dauphine's filles d’honneur. Madame de Maintenon had engaged her to place the Dauphin upon good terms with the filles d’honneur, and she finished by estranging him altogether from his wife. During her pregnancy, which, as well as her lying-in, was extremely painful, the Dauphine could not go out; and this Montchevreuil took advantage of the opportunity thus afforded her to introduce the filles d’honneur to the Dauphin to hunt and game with him. He became fond, in his way, of the sister of La Force, who was afterwards compelled to marry young Du Roure. [...] The Dauphin had an affair of gallantry with another of his wife's filles d’honneur called Rambures. He did not affect any dissimulation with his wife; a great uproar ensued; and that wicked Bessola, following the directions of old Maintenon, who planned everything, detached the Dauphin from his wife more and more. The latter was not very fond of him; but what displeased her in his amours was that they exposed her to be openly and constantly ridiculed and insulted. Montchevreuil made her pay attention to all that passed, and Bessola kept up her anger against her husband."

Elizabeth Charlotte also claimed that the Dauphin did not mourn his spouse when she died, "old Montchevreuil had told him so many lies of his wife that he could not love her."
