= Jacques Nompar de Caumont, 7th Duke of La Force =

Duke de La Force

Jacques Nompar de Caumont
- 7th Duke of La Force; Marquis of La Force
- Born: 18 April 1714
- Died: 14 July 1755 (aged 41); Bagnières
- Noble family: Caumont
- Spouse: Marie Louise de Noailles
- Father: Armand-Nompar II de Caumont, duc de La Force
- Mother: Anne-Elisabeth Gruel de Boismont

Jacques Nompar de Caumont, 7th Duke of La Force (18 April 1714 – 14 July 1755) was a French nobleman and peer, the son of Armand-Nompar II de Caumont, duc de La Force and Anne-Elisabeth Gruel de Boismont. He held the title of Marquis of La Force until he succeeded his father as duc de La Force in 1761.

== Marriage ==
He married, 8 April 1730, Marie Louise de Noailles (1710-1782), daughter of Adrien Maurice de Noailles and Françoise Charlotte d'Aubigné. The marriage was childless.

He died 14 July 1755 at Bagnières.

== Sources ==
- "Les derniers seigneurs de Caumont". Histoire de Caumont. Mariefb.pagesperso–orange.fr.
- Sainte–Marie, Anselme de and Sainte–Rosalie, Ange de (1728). Histoire de la Maison Royale de France, et des grands officiers de la Couronne & de la Maison de Roy: & des anciens Barons de Royaume. Vol. IV (3rd ed.). Paris: Compaignies des Libraires. p. 475.
