= Louise-Victoire de La Force =

Historic French courtier

Louise-Victoire de La Force (1665–1722), was a French courtier. She was the first lover of Louis, Dauphin of France (son of Louis XIV).

She was born to Jacques Nompar de Caumont, 4th Duke of La Force and Marie de Saint-Simon-Courtomer (c. 1639-1670).

She was made maid-of-honour to Maria Anna Victoria of Bavaria in 1686, and as such was placed under the supervision of Marguerite de Montchevreuil. She was described as lively, witty and charming. She became the mistress of the Dauphin, which was a scandal at court.

Elizabeth Charlotte, Madame Palatine claimed in her letters that Madame de Maintenon did not wish the Dauphine to play any great role at court, slandered her against the king and bribed Barbara Bessola to isolate her. Elizabeth Charlotte claimed that Marguerite de Montchevreuil had been engaged by Maintenon to estrange the Dauphine and her spouse, quote:

"That lady had also another creature in the Dauphine's household: this was Madame de Montchevreuil, the gouvernante of the Dauphine's filles d’honneur. Madame de Maintenon had engaged her to place the Dauphin upon good terms with the filles d’honneur, and she finished by estranging him altogether from his wife. During her pregnancy, which, as well as her lying-in, was extremely painful, the Dauphine could not go out; and this Montchevreuil took advantage of the opportunity thus afforded her to introduce the filles d’honneur to the Dauphin to hunt and game with him. He became fond, in his way, of the sister of La Force, who was afterwards compelled to marry young Du Roure. [...] The Dauphin had an affair of gallantry with another of his wife's filles d’honneur called Rambures. He did not affect any dissimulation with his wife; a great uproar ensued; and that wicked Bessola, following the directions of old Maintenon, who planned everything, detached the Dauphin from his wife more and more. The latter was not very fond of him; but what displeased her in his amours was that they exposed her to be openly and constantly ridiculed and insulted. Montchevreuil made her pay attention to all that passed, and Bessola kept up her anger against her husband."

In 1688, King Louis XIV arranged for her to marry Louis Scipion III de Grimoard de Beauvoir, Marquis du Roure and Marquis de Grisac (d. 1690) in order to dismiss her from court and thus end her relationship with the Dauphin.
