= Armand Nompar de Caumont, 6th Duke of La Force =

Duke of La Force

Armand Nompar de Caumont
- 6th Duke of La Force; Marquis of La Force
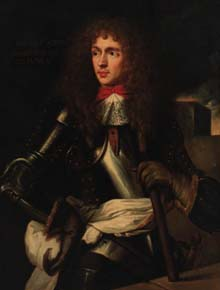
- The nobleman before his accession as Duke (1727) and his elder brother's death in 1726.
- Born: 7 May 1679
- Died: 3 July 1761 (aged 82)
- Noble family: Caumont
- Spouse: Anne-Elisabeth Gruel de Boismont
- Issue: Jacques-Nompar III de Caumont, duc de La Force; Olympe de Caumont La Force; Antonin de Caumont La Force; Armand de Caumont La Force
- Father: Jacques-Nompar II de Caumont, duc de La Force
- Mother: Suzanne de Beringhen

Armand Nompar de Caumont, 6th Duke of La Force (7 May 1679 – 3 July 1761) was a French nobleman and peer, a son of Jacques-Nompar II de Caumont, duc de La Force and Suzanne de Beringhen. He held the title of Marquis de Boësse until the death of his elder brother, Henri-Jacques Nompar de Caumont, duc de La Force. He assumed the title of duc de La Force and became a peer at the closing of parliament 13 March 1727.

== Marriage and issue ==
He married, 17 July 1713, Anne-Elisabeth Gruel de Boismont, widow of Jean François Michel de la Brosse, daughter of Jacques Gruel de Boismont of Hyesmes in Normandy and Marie de Brillard du Perron. The couple had three sons and a daughter:

1. Jacques-Nompar III de Caumont, duc de La Force, (1714 - 1755), married 8 April 1730 Marie Louise de Noailles (1710 – 1782)
2. Olympe de Caumont La Force (1718 – 1757 ), married 13 January 1739, Anne Hilarion de Galard de Brassac de Béarn
3. Adélaïde de Gallard de Brassac de Béarn 1739-1829 married 5 June 1757 to Bertrand Nompar de Caumont, marquis de La Force (1724 - 1773)

- Alexandre de Gallard de Brassac de Béarn married 15 February 1768 to Anne Marie Gabrielle Potier de Novion (1747 - )

- Antonin de Caumont La Force (1721 - )
- Armand de Caumont La Force 1721 – 1744 married 14 June 1742 to Philiberte Jeanne Amelot de Chaillou

He died 3 July 1761 and was succeeded by his eldest son Jacques-Nompar III de Caumont, duc de La Force.

== Sources ==
- "Les Derniers Seigneurs de Caumont". Histoire de Caumont. Mariefb.pagesperso–orange.fr.
- Sainte–Marie, Anselme de and Sainte–Rosalie, Ange de (1728). Histoire de la Maison Royale de France, et des grands officiers de la Couronne & de la Maison de Roy: & des anciens Barons de Royaume. Vol. IV (3rd ed.). Paris: Compaignies des Libraires. pp. 474, 475.
