= Maria Molina (courtier) =

French (originally Spanish) courtier

Doña Maria Molina (fl. 1660 - after 1676), was a French (originally Spanish) courtier. She served as premiere femme du chambre to the queen of France, Maria Theresa of Spain. She was also known as La Molina.

== Biography ==
Molina was included in the Spanish entourage accompanying Marie Therese to France upon her wedding to Louis XIV in 1660. Marie Therese brought a large Spanish entourage with her upon her arrival, which formed her household together with the new French courtiers appointed to her. However, when Louis XIV found the queen to favor her Spanish courtiers too much, the majority of them were sent home.

Molina belonged to the few Spanish courtiers to remain with Marie-Therese in France. She was given the French title of première femme de Chambre and as such had great informal influence in the household of the queen. She is noted to have been a personal favorite and confidante of Marie Therese, and reportedly often slept in her bedchamber, comforting her when she was inflicted by anxiety and nightmares, which forced the king to order her out when he visited the queen in her bedchamber. She was described as discreet and correct.

Her daughter Clorinde Molina was also employed in the queen's household, as was her niece Anna Molina, who assisted her as femme de chambre in 1660–1673.

Molina is mentioned in contemporary memoirs.

== See also ==
- Barbara Bessola
