= Bertrand Nompar de Caumont, marquis de La Force =

French nobleman and knight

Bertrand Nompar de Caumont
- Marquis de La Force; Marquis de Caumont; Marquis de Taillebourg; Comte de Mussidan; Baron de Castelnau-Les Milandes; Seigneur de Beauvilla
- Born: 1 August 1724; Saint-Porquier, Languedoc
- Died: 22 January 1773 (aged 48); Versailles
- Noble family: Caumont
- Spouse: Adélaïde Luce de Gallard de Brassac de Béarn
- Issue: Anne Jacobe; Jacques Armand, marquis de La Force; Catherine; Alexandre Nompar; Renée Philiberte; Anne Philiberte; Louis Joseph Nompar; François Pierre Bertrand, comte de Caumont La Force; Josephine Louise; Marie; Catherine; Louise Josephine
- Father: Jean François de Caumont
- Mother: Jeanne de Maury

Bertrand Nompar de Caumont, marquis de La Force (1 August 1724 – 22 January 1773) was a French nobleman, the son of Jean François de Caumont (1694 – 1755) and Jeanne de Maury (died 1770). He was a knight, and held the titles of seigneur de Beauvilla then marquis de La Force, Caumont and Taillebourg, comte de Mussidan and baron de Castelnau-Les-Milandes. In the royal household he was appointed as Garde du Corps du Roi and Gentilhomme de la Chambre.

== Marriage and issue ==
He married 5 June 1757 Adélaïde Luce de Galard de Brassac, (1739 – 1829), granddaughter of Armand-Nompar II de Caumont, duc de la Force. The couple had four sons and eight daughters:

- Anne Jacobe, (19 August 1758 – ), married François Marie Armand, marquis Piovera
- Jacques Armand, marquis de La Force, (1759–1762)
- Catherine, (c. 1760 – ), married Gilbert de Gironde Comte de Pille
- Alexandre Nompar,(1764 – 1765)
- Renée Philiberte, (c. 1765 – )
- Anne Philiberte, (1766 – 1777)
- Louis Joseph Nompar, married 11 May 1784, Sophie Pauline d'Ossun (1772 – )
- François Pierre Bertrand, (29 November 1772 – 28 March 1854), comte then marquis de Caumont La force
- Josephine Louise, married in 1779, comte de Béthune
- Marie, married 8 March 1781, Anne Louis François, Marquis de Lordat, comte de Bram
- Catherine, married 1 August 1784, Hippolyte César de Moretoul
- Louise Josephine, (1769 – ), married Marc Antoine Alexandre Dieudonné Edmond, comte de Mesnard

He died 22 January 1773 in Versailles. His widow, Adelaide de Galard, died in October 1829

== Sources ==
- "Caumont (de), Bertrand Nompar". Histoire de Caumont: Généalogie Caumont La Force. Mariefb.pagesperso–orange.fr.
- "Les derniers seigneurs de Caumont". Histoire de Caumont. Mariefb.pagesperso–orange.fr.
- Pattou, Etienne (2010). "Seigneurs de Caumont-La Force" (PDF). Racines et Histoire. Racineshistoire.free.fr.
