= Henri Jacques Nompar de Caumont, 5th Duke of La Force =

Duke of La Force, member of the Académie française

Henri Jacques Nompar de Caumont
- 5th Duke of La Force; Duke of Caumont; Count of Mussidan
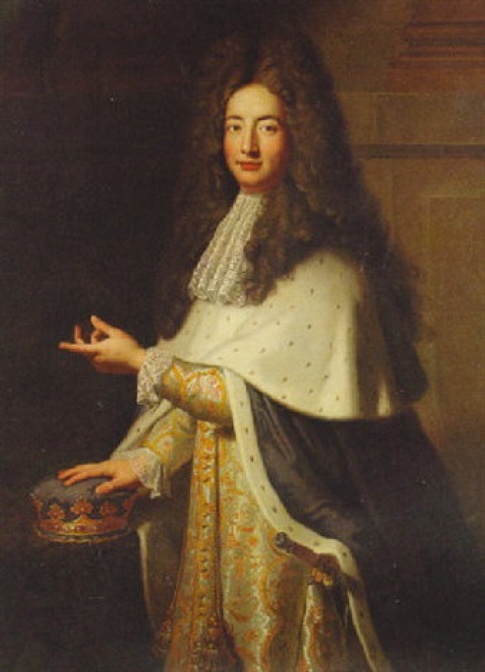
- Born: 5 March 1675
- Died: 20 July 1726 (aged 51)
- Buried: Périgord
- Noble family: Caumont
- Spouse: Anne Marie Beuzelen de Bosmelet
- Issue: Marie Jeanne Antonine de Caumont La Force
- Father: Jacques-Nompar II de Caumont, duc de La Force
- Mother: Suzanne de Beringhen

Henri Jacques Nompar de Caumont, 5th Duke of La Force (5 March 1675 – 20 July 1726) was a French nobleman and peer, the son of Jacques-Nompar II de Caumont, duc de La Force and Suzanne de Beringhen. He was a member of the Académie française.

== Marriage and issue ==
On 19 June 1698 he married Anne Marie Beuzelen de Bosmelet (1668–1752), daughter of Jean Beuzelen, seigneur de Bosmelet and Renée Bouthillier, and by her had four daughters, none of whom survived childhood:

- Marie Jeanne Antonine de Caumont La Force (1699–1699)
- Née (infant, died young) de Caumont La Force (1700–1704)
- Née (as above) de Caumont La Force (1701–1702)
- Née (as above) de Caumont La Force (1702–1703)

The Museum of Fine Arts, Rouen, calls Anne Marie's painting of 1714, by François de Troy, who is taking a peach from a tray presented by a child, as "one of the masterpieces". It notes certain rules of the late critic and painter Roger de Piles were closely followed.

== Career ==
He held the title of duc de Caumont until the death of his father, then assumed the title of duc de La Force at the closing of parliament 5 August 1700. He also held the titles of comte de Mussidan, baron de Castelnau, Caumont, Tunneins, Samazin, Feuillet, Taillebourg, Boësse, Cugnac, Roquepine, Maduran and la Boulaye. He was a colonel of a regiment of his name, as well as a councillor to the councils of regency and finance.

In 1712 La Force was a founder and the first patron of the Académie Nationale des Sciences, Belles–Lettres et Arts de Bordeaux. He became a member of the Académie française in 1715, replacing Fabio Brulart de Sillery. He was elected to seat 7 of the Académie on 19 January 1715 and was received by Abbot Jean d'Estrées on 28 January 1715.

He was vice-chairman of the Board of Finance in 1716, and deputy finance minister from 1718 to 1719.

He had trouble with the Parliament for its complicity in the bankruptcy law.

He died on 20 July 1726 and he was buried in his duchy in Périgord. He was succeeded by his younger brother, Armand-Nompar. His widow died on 16 November 1752. The Hôtel de La Force, his former residence, stood alongside the Rue du Roi de Sicile, in what is today's 4th arrondissement of Paris. The war ministry acquired it in 1754 and in 1780 it became La Force Prison.

== Sources ==
- Bartlett, David W. (1890). Paris: With Pen and Pencil; Its People and Literature, Its Life and Business. New York: Hurst.
- "Les Derniers Seigneurs de Caumont". Histoire de Caumont. Mariefb.pagesperso–orange.fr.
- Galignani, A. and Galignani, W. (1827). Galignani's New Paris Guide, or, Stranger's Companion Through the French Metropolis (15th ed.). Paris: A. and W. Galignani. p. 488.
- "Henri-Jacques de LA FORCE". Académie française: The Immortals. Academie–francaise.fr.
- The history of Paris: from the earliest period to the present day ... Vol. II. London: G. B. Whittaker; A. and W. Galignani. 1825.
- Moréri, Louis (1759). Le Grand Dictionnaire Historique du Moréri ou le Mélange Curieux de l'Histoire Sacrée et Profane. Vol. 5 (1759 ed.). Geneva: Slatkine Reprints. p. 246. ISBN 2-05-101303-9.
- Sainte–Marie, Anselme de and Sainte–Rosalie, Ange de (1728). Histoire de la Maison Royale de France, et des grands officiers de la Couronne & de la Maison de Roy: & des anciens Barons de Royaume. Vol. IV (3rd ed.). Paris: Compaignies des Libraires. pp. 474–475.
