= Duke of La Force =

Historical title in the Peerage of France

The title of Duke of La Force, Peer of France, in the peerage of France, was created in 1637 for members of the Caumont family, who were lords of the village of La Force in the Dordogne region.

The family originated as Lord of Caumont (Seigneur de Caumont) in the early 11th century and were subsequently raised in rank over the following centuries.

The family is Protestant : the father (François de Caumont) and brother of the first Duke were killed in the St. Bartholomew's Day Massacre (1572). Afterwards the family served the king loyally on the battlefield, but remained Protestant.

Armand de Caumont died in 1764 on the battlefield at Cuneo on 30 September, at the age of 23. Afterwards, the dukedom passed to a distant relative of the main line, Bertrand (1724–1773), then to his son, Louis-Joseph Nompar (1768–1838) and to his descendants. In 1909, the great-great-grandson of Louis-Joseph, Armand-Joseph (1878–1961), took the title of Duke of La Force. There are La Force and LeForce families in the United Kingdom, United States, Canada, Belgium and Portugal descendant of the French family.

== Lord of Caumont (from father to son) ==
- Calo I (c. 1050), 1st lord of Caumont
- Geoffrey I, 2nd lord of Caumont
- Calo II, 3rd lord of Caumont. He participated in the First Crusade.
- Dodon, 4th lord of Caumont
- Sanchez, 5th lord of Caumont
- Richard, 6th lord of Caumont, had two sons, including Nompar, Lord of Lauzun
- Begon, 7th lord of Caumont
- William I, 8th lord of Caumont
- William II, 9th lord of Caumont

== Lord of Caumont, Samazan and Montpuillan (father to son) ==
- Bertrand, son of William II, 9th lord of Caumont. 10th lord of Caumont, 1st lord of Samazan and Montpuillan
- William III, 11th lord of Caumont, 2nd lord of Samazan and Montpuillan
- William-Raymond I, 12th lord of Caumont, 3rd lord of Samazan and Montpuillan
- Nompar I, 13th lord of Caumont, 4th lord of Samazan and Montpuillan

== Lord of Caumont, Samazan, Montpuillan, Castelnau and Berbiguires ==
- William-Raymond II (d. 1418), son of Nompar I, 13th lord of Caumont, 4th lord of Samazan and Montpuillan. 14th lord of Caumont, 5th lord of Samazan and Montpuillan, 1st lord of Castelnau and Berbiguires
- Nompar II, son of Raymond II, lord of Caumont, Castelnau, Castelculier and Berbiguières

== Lord of Castelnau ==
- Brandelis, son of William-Raymond II. 2nd lord of Castelnau
- Charles I, 3rd lord of Castelnau
- Charles II (d. 1627), 4th lord of Castelnau
- Francis (killed in the St. Bartholomew's Day Massacre), 5th lord of Castelnau

== Duc de La Force, Peer of France (1637-1699) ==
- Jacques-Nompar de Caumont, duc de La Force, (1558–1652), marshal of France
- Armand-Nompar de Caumont, duc de La Force, (1580?-1675), son and marshal of France
- Henri-Nompar de Caumont, duc de La Force, (1582–1678), brother
- Jacques-Nompar II de Caumont, duc de La Force, (1630?-1699), grandson

== Duc de La Force, Comte de Mussidan, Baron of Castelnau, Caumont, Tonneins and Samazan (1699-1773) ==
- Henri-Jacques Nompar de Caumont, duc de La Force, (1675–1726), son and Member of the Académie française
- Armand-Nompar II de Caumont, duc de La Force, (1679–1764), brother
- Jacques-Nompar III de Caumont, duc de La Force, (1714–1755), son

== Marquis puis Duc de La Force, Peer of France (1773-1838) ==
- Louis-Joseph Nompar, Marquis then duc de La Force in 1787 (1768–1838)

== Duke of La Force (pour le second creation) (1839-Present) ==
- François Pierre Bertrand Nompar de Caumont, 9th duc de La Force (1772–1854)
- Auguste de Caumont, 10th duc de La Force (1803–1882)
- Oliver Emmanuel de Caumont, 11th duc de La Force (1839–1909)
- Auguste de Caumont, 12th duc de La Force (1878–1961)
- Jacques de Caumont La Force, 13th duc de La Force (1912–1985)
- Henri Jacques Nompar de Caumont La Force (1944 -), 14th duc de La Force

== Other homonym families ==
(This family is different from the branch Busquet de Chandoisel de Caumont , or Busquet de Caumont de Marivault originating from Normandy.)

== Sources ==
- Family tree of the Caumont family (French)
- History of the Caumont family (French)
