= Barbara Bessola =

French courtier

Barbara Bessola (also Bezzola, Besola) (d. after 1690), was a French courtier. She was a member of the German entourage of Maria Anna Victoria of Bavaria when she arrived in France for her wedding with the Dauphin in 1680. In France, she had the office Première femme de Chambre.

== Biography ==
She became known at court as the sole favorite and intimate confidant of the Dauphine, who isolated herself with her and neglected to participate in court life and representation. Contemporaries blamed Bessola for the isolation of the Dauphine, and claimed that she prevented her from learning proper French by only speaking German with her, and that she wanted to prevent the Dauphine from learning French so as not to be replaced in her favor. The Dauphine herself referred to Bessola as her only weakness.

Elizabeth Charlotte, Madame Palatine claimed in her letters that Madame de Maintenon did not wish the Dauphine to play any great role at court, slandered her against the king and bribed Barbara Bessola to isolate her. Bessola and Elizabeth Charlotte disliked each other, and the former accused the latter of being a spy of Maintenon.

Elizabeth Charlotte claimed that Marguerite de Montchevreuil had been engaged by Maintenon to estrange the Dauphine and her spouse, and that Bessola helped her with this:

"That lady had also another creature in the Dauphine’s household: this was Madame de Montchevreuil, the gouvernante of the Dauphine’s filles d’honneur. Madame de Maintenon had engaged her to place the Dauphin upon good terms with the filles d’honneur, and she finished by estranging him altogether from his wife. During her pregnancy, which, as well as her lying-in, was extremely painful, the Dauphine could not go out; and this Montchevreuil took advantage of the opportunity thus afforded her to introduce the filles d’honneur to the Dauphin to hunt and game with him. He became fond, in his way, of the sister of La Force, who was afterwards compelled to marry young Du Roure. [...] The Dauphin had an affair of gallantry with another of his wife’s filles d’honneur called Rambures. He did not affect any dissimulation with his wife; a great uproar ensued; and that wicked Bessola, following the directions of old Maintenon, who planned everything, detached the Dauphin from his wife more and more. The latter was not very fond of him; but what displeased her in his amours was that they exposed her to be openly and constantly ridiculed and insulted. Montchevreuil made her pay attention to all that passed, and Bessola kept up her anger against her husband."

Barbara Bessola returned to Germany after the death of the Dauphine in 1690. She is mentioned in memoirs and letters of the time.

== See also ==
- Maria Molina (courtier)
