= Armand Nompar de Caumont, 2nd Duke of La Force =

Duke of La Force (1652-1675), Marshall of France

Armand Nompar de Caumont
- 2nd Duke of La Force; Marquis de La Force
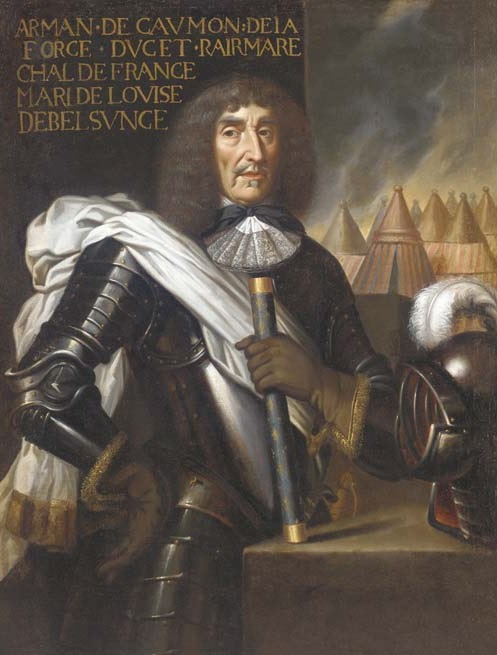
- Portrait by Philippe de Champaigne
- Born: 30 October 1580
- Died: 16 December 1675 (aged 95)
- Noble family: Caumont
- Spouses: Jeanne de Rochefaton; Louise de Belzunce
- Issue: Charlotte de Caumont; Jacques de Caumont
- Father: Jacques-Nompar de Caumont, duc de La Force
- Mother: Charlotte de Gontaut

Armand Nompar de Caumont, 2nd Duke of La Force (30 October 1580 – 16 December 1675) was a Marshal of France and peer of France. He was the son of another Marshal of France, Jacques-Nompar de Caumont, duc de La Force and Charlotte de Gontaut, daughter of Marshal Armand de Gontaut, baron de Biron. Like his father, Armand-Nompar was a Huguenot Protestant.

== Marriage and issue ==
He married as his first wife, Jeanne de Rochefaton, dame de Saveilles and had two children:

- Charlotte de Caumont (1623–1666), married in 1651 Marshal Turenne, but died without children.
- Jacques de Caumont (1633–1661), without issue

Jeanne de Rochefaton died in 1667. On 12 December of the same year, Armand Nompar remarried with the 17-year-old Louise de Belsunce who died from smallpox and without children on 7 December 1680.

== Career ==
Armand-Nompar de Caumont was made Grand Maître de la garde-robe in 1632, an office that he resigned in 1637.He followed his father in most of his expeditions, became a maréchal de camp in 1625, defeated and captured General Colloredo at Baccarat in 1636, had two horses killed under him at the siege of Hondarribia in 1638 and became lieutenant général in 1641. First marquis de La Force, later duc de La Force, he fought in the wars of Louis XIII and Louis XIV in Italy and Germany. He succeeded his father as duc de La Force and a peer of France and was sworn in as a Marshal of France on 29 August 1652 at Compiègne.

He died at the Château de La Force in the Dordogne on 16 December 1675, without heir. The title of Duc de La Force went to his younger brother Henri-Nompar.

== Sources ==
- "Armand de Caumont La Force". Généalogie Wailly. Gw.geneanet.org.
- Caumont, Jacques-Nompar de, Duc De La Force (1843). Mémoires authentiques de Jacques Nompar de Caumont, duc de La Force, maréchal de France, et de ses deux fils, les marquis de Montpouillan et de Castelnaut ... Vol. IV. Paris: Charpentier.
- "Les Derniers Seigneurs de Caumont". Histoire de Caumont. Mariefb.pagesperso–orange.fr.
- "La Force (Armand de Caumont, duc de)". Grand Dictionnaire Universel du XIXe sciècle. Laforce.be.
- Sainte-Marie, Anselme de and Sainte-Rosalie, Ange de (1728). Histoire de la Maison Royale de France, et des grands officiers de la Couronne & de la Maison de Roy: & des anciens Barons de Royaume. Vol. IV (3rd ed.). Paris: Compaignies des Libraires. pp. 472, 465–466.
