= Nompar of Caumont =

French nobleman

- Coat-of-arms of Caumont
- Born: 1391
- Died: 1446 (aged 54–55); England
- Writing career
- Notable work: Voyaige d'oultremer en Jhérusalem

Nompar of Caumont (1391–1446) was a Gascon lord who left written accounts of his pilgrimages to Santiago de Compostela and Jerusalem. His work has also contributed lexicographic inputs to the Dictionary of Middle French.

== Biography ==
His family had long allied with the English. He had been named for his paternal grandfather, Nompar of Caumont, the King of England's seneschal of Agenais, who was appointed in April 1400 in English Gascony.

During his minority he was brought up by his cousin the count of Foix, then married young and had two sons. (Note: His eldest son was probably killed in 1426. Samazeuilh 1846, p. 460)

He left for Compostela in July 1414, at the age of twenty-three, then for Jerusalem, between February 1419 and April 1420. He was, at that time, known as lord of Caumont, Castelnau, Castelculier and Berbiguières.

He was exiled in 1443 by Charles VII, King of France, and dispossessed of his lands in favor of his brother. He died in England three years later, leaving written accounts of his pilgrimages and a book for his children.

== Voyaige d'oultremer en Jhérusalem ==
His book was published for the first time in 1858. Nompar describes the meaning of his pilgrimage and how he was made a Knight of the Holy Sepulchre. He criticized the manners of his time. Particularly the lords of his time, more concerned to wage war on each other than to go crusade. He put his own banner next to that of the king of England. And the next day, he created its own order of chivalry which had, for a distinctive mark, an azure scarf.

== Works ==
- Dits et Enseignemens
- Voyaige a St Jaques en Compostelle, 1414 (Note: in 1417 according to varying sources. (Svátek 2012, p. 34) (Henry 2009))
- Voyaige d'oultremer en Jhérusalem, 1419–1420

== See also ==
- Duc de La Force

== Notes, citations and sources ==
=== Sources ===
- Baecque, Antoine de (2015). Les voix de Compostelle [The Voices of Compostela] (in French). Paris, France: Editions Omnibus. ISBN 978-2-258-11671-9.
- Nompar of Caumont; Guillaume Manier; Jean Bonnecaze (2009). Henry, Christine; Vialle, Jean-Pierre (eds.). Sur le chemin de Compostelle: trois récits de pèlerins partis vers Saint-Jacques (1417, 1726, 1748) [On the way to Compostela: Three Accounts of Pilgrims to St. James's] (in French). Paris, France: Cosmopole. ISBN 978-2-8463-0043-8. OCLC 690771048.
- Herbert, Capucine (2016). Les récits de voyage des XIVe et XVe siècles lemmatisés : apports lexicographiques au Dictionnaire du Moyen français [Lemmatised travel stories of the 14th and 15th centuries: lexicographic contributions to the Dictionary of Middle French] (Thesis) (in French). Nancy, France: University of Lorraine. Docket tel-01752218v2.

Svátek, Jaroslav (2012). Discours et récit de noble voyageur à la fin du Moyen Âge : Ogier d'Anglure, Nompar de Caumont, Guilbert de Lannoy et Bertrandon de la Broquière [Discourse and Account of the Noble Traveller in the Late Middle Ages: Ogier of Anglure, Nompar of Caumont, Guillebert de Lannoy and Bertrandon of La Broquiere] (Thesis) (in French). Lille, France: [S.l.] : [s.n.] OCLC 869284323.

- Samazeuilh, Jean-François (1846). Histoire de l'Agenais [History of Agenais] (in French). Auch, France: Printing-house of J. Foix.
- Tolan, John V. (2009). Saint Francis and the Sultan. New York, US: Oxford University Press. ISBN -9-780-199-23972-6.
