= Aubin-Louis Millin de Grandmaison =

French antiquary and naturalist (1759–1818)

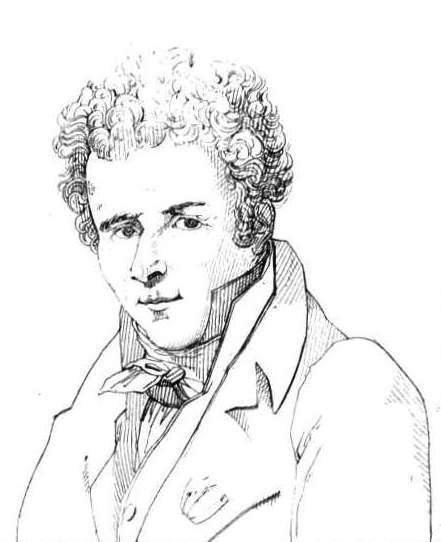
Sketch of Millin from Biographie des hommes vivants (1818)

Aubin-Louis Millin de Grandmaison (19 July 1759 (Paris) – 14 August 1818 Paris) was an antiquary and naturalist erudite in various domains, who succeeded Jean-Jacques Barthélemy as curator of the Cabinet des médailles et antiques of the former French royal library and took an interest in medieval art, which was just beginning to attract serious attention, as well as classical culture.

== Biography ==
During the French Revolution he was imprisoned in 1793 as a result of his campaigns against Jacobins in the Chronique de Paris, which he edited. At the end of a year's term, he was freed following the Thermidorian Reaction, to teach archeology at the nationalised royal library, reestablished as the Bibliothèque nationale; there he also served as conservateur-professeur in the department of antiquities and in 1799-1800 as president of the Conservatoire de la Bibliothèque nationale de France.

As a naturalist he joined Pierre Marie Auguste Broussonet (1761–1807) and Louis-Augustin Bosc d'Antic (1759–1828) to form the first Linnean society in the world, the Société linnéenne de Paris. His Éléments d'Histoire naturelle (1797) formed part of the curriculum of the École centrale Paris.

At the same time he was known for the many articles he published on Greek vases. In 1806, appeared his Dictionnaire des Beaux-Arts. From 1807 to 1811, appeared the four volumes of his Voyage dans les départemens du Midi de la France, accompanied by an atlas. In 1811 he travelled in Italy and Sicily, and afterwards published designs of the mosaic paving in the cathedrals of Apulia.

Millin de Grandmaison was the director of the Magasin encyclopédique and participated in other scientific reviews and belonged to numerous scientific societies. He translated numerous accounts of voyages, edited two dissertations of Carl von Linné for the Société philomathique de Paris and one by Johan Christian Fabricius (1745–1808). He carried on an important correspondence with the German archaeologist Karl August Böttiger.

In 1817, he was a founder of the Annales encyclopédiques.

Millin de Grandmaison was born and died in Paris.
