= Jacques Nompar de Caumont, 1st Duke of La Force =

Duke of La Force (1637-1652), Marshall of France

Jacques Nompar de Caumont
- 1st Duke of La Force; Marquis of La Force
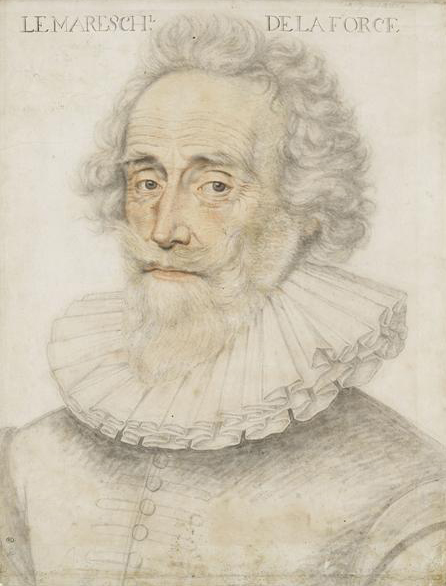
- Portrait by Daniel Dumonstier, 1633
- Born: 30 October 1558
- Died: 10 May 1652 (aged 93)
- Buried: Milandes
- Noble family: Caumont
- Spouse: Charlotte de Gontaut
- Issue: 8, including Armand-Nompar and Henri-Nompar
- Father: Francois de Caumont
- Mother: Philippe de Beaupoil

Jacques Nompar de Caumont, 1st Duke of La Force (French pronunciation: [ʒak nɔ̃paːʁ də komɔ̃ dyk də la fɔʁs]) (30 December 1558 – 10 May 1652) was a Marshal of France and Peer of France.

== Life ==
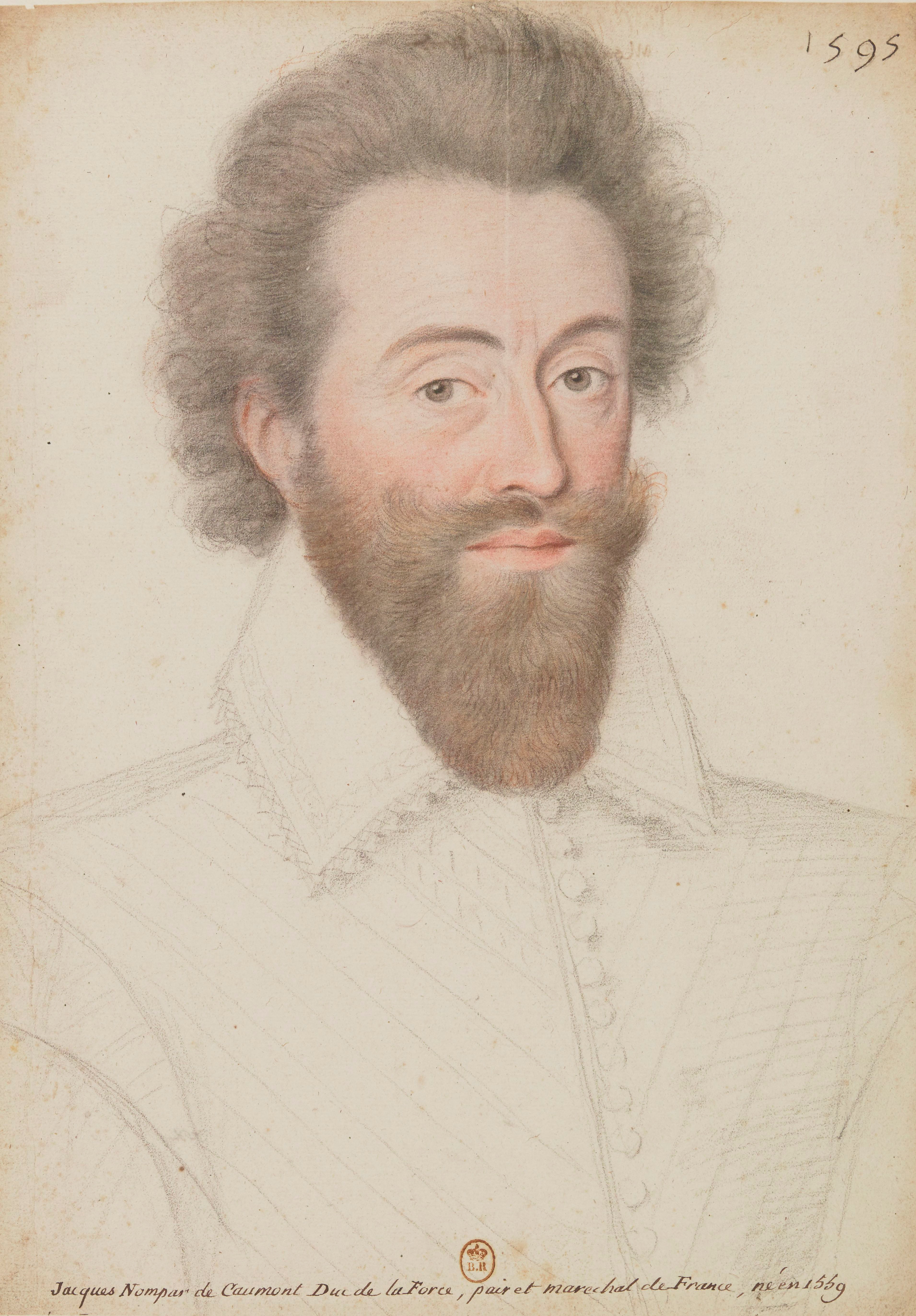
Portrait attributed to François Quesnel, 1595

Caumont was the son of a Huguenot, Francois de Caumont, lord of Castelnau, and Philippe de Beaupoil. He survived the St. Bartholomew's Day Massacre in 1572, but his father and older brother Armand were killed. As marquis de La Force, Caumont served Henry IV, whose confidence he enjoyed. He was governor of Béarn from 1593 to 1621 and then viceroy of Navarre. After the assassination of Henry IV in 1610, Caumont fought with the Huguenots against Louis XIII. He plotted with Henri de Rohan and participated in the successful defence of Montauban in 1621, after an 86-day siege by the king, although he was reconciled with Louis XIII the following year.

Caumont was made a marshal of France on 27 May 1622, to be employed as the Lieutenant-General of the Army of Piedmont. He campaigned in Piedmont in 1630, during the War of the Mantuan Succession, taking Pinerolo as well as Saluzzo and defeated the Spaniards at Carignano. In 1631, Caumont served in the Languedoc and between 1631 and 1634 he invaded Lorraine, and took La Mothe after a siege of 141 days in which Turenne first distinguished himself and Caumont's grandson Jacques was killed. He raised the siege of Philippsburg in Baden in 1634, during the Thirty Years' War, and captured the general Colloredo. In the following year, Caumont relieved Heidelberg and took Speyer.

Caumont was created Duc de La Force and a peer on 3 August 1637. In 1638 he besieged Saint-Omer in Flanders, but was defeated by Thomas Francis, Prince of Carignano. It was his last battle. Caumont died in Bergerac on 10 May 1652 and was buried in Milandes. He was succeeded by his eldest son, Armand-Nompar. His memoirs were published in 1843.

== Marriages and issue ==
- He married, on 5 February 1577, Charlotte de Gontaut, (1561–June 1635), daughter of marshal Armand de Gontaut, baron de Biron, and by her had ten children:
  - Armand-Nompar de Caumont, duc de La Force (c.1580–1675), peer and marshal of France. His daughter
    - Charlotte married Henri de la Tour d'Auvergne, Vicomte de Turenne, but died in 1666 without children.
  - Henri-Nompar de Caumont, duc de La Force (1582–1678), his daughter
    - Charlotte married in 1630 de Gabriel de Caumont, comte de Lauzun, and were parents of
      - Antoine Nompar de Caumont, Duc de Lauzun
  - Jacques, seigneur de Maduran, killed during the Siege of Jülich in 1610
  - Charles, seigneur de Maduran.
  - Pierre, baron d'Aymet.
  - Jean, seigneur de Montpouillan.
  - Jean-Jacob, marquis de Tonneins
  - François de Caumont La Force, whose daughter was:
    - Charlotte-Rose de Caumont La Force or Mademoiselle de La Force (1654–1724)
  - Jacqueline
  - Isabelle
- He married, after 1635, Anne de Mornay, widow of Jacques Moues and daughter of Philippe de Mornay
- He married, after 1635, Isabelle de Clermont-Gallerande, widow of Gideon van den Boetzelaer (1569–1634), Ambassador of the States of Holland in France.

== See also ==
- Peter Force
- William Force Stead

== Sources ==
- Caumont, Auguste de, Duc de La Force (1950). Le Maréchal de La Force, un Serviteur de Sept Rois (1558-1652). Paris: Éditions de la Table Ronde; Plon. p. 24.
- Caumont, Jacques-Nompar de, Duc De La Force (1843). Mémoires authentiques de Jacques Nompar de Caumont, duc de La Force, maréchal de France, et de ses deux fils, les marquis de Montpouillan et de Castelnaut ... Vol. I. Paris: Charpentier.
- Caumont, Jacques-Nompar de, Duc De La Force (1843). Mémoires authentiques de Jacques Nompar de Caumont, duc de La Force, maréchal de France, et de ses deux fils, les marquis de Montpouillan et de Castelnaut ... Vol. II. Paris: Charpentier.
- Caumont, Jacques-Nompar de, Duc De La Force (1843). Mémoires authentiques de Jacques Nompar de Caumont, duc de La Force, maréchal de France, et de ses deux fils, les marquis de Montpouillan et de Castelnaut ... Vol. III. Paris: Charpentier.
- Caumont, Jacques-Nompar de, Duc De La Force (1843). Mémoires authentiques de Jacques Nompar de Caumont, duc de La Force, maréchal de France, et de ses deux fils, les marquis de Montpouillan et de Castelnaut ... Vol. IV. Paris: Charpentier.
- Delaforce, Patrick and Baldry, Ken (2006). "The Caumonts" (PDF). The Delaforce Family History. Art-science.com. p. 92.
- "Les Derniers Seigneurs de Caumont". Histoire de Caumont. Mariefb.pagesperso-orange.fr.
- Guthrie, William P. (2003). The Later Thirty Years War: From the Battle of Wittstock to the Treaty of Westphalia. Vol. 222. Westport: Greenwood Press. pp. 78, 100, 200. ISBN 0-313-32408-5. ISSN 0883-6884.
- "Jacques-Nompar De CAUMONT, duc DE LA FORCE". Grand Dictionnaire Universel du XIXe sciècle. Laforce.be.
- Parrot, David (2004). Richelieu's Army: War, Government and Society in France, 1624-1642 (hardback). Cambridge: Cambridge University Press. p. 128. ISBN 0-521-79209-6.
- Sainte-Marie, Anselme de and Sainte-Rosalie, Ange de (1728). Histoire de la Maison Royale de France, et des grands officiers de la Couronne & de la Maison de Roy: & des anciens Barons de Royaume. Vol. IV (3rd ed.). Paris: Compaignies des Libraires. pp. 472, 465–466.
- Souleyreau, Marie-Catherine Vignal (2013). Le Trésor Pillé du Roi: Correspondance du Cardinal de Richelieu, Année 1634. Vol. I. Paris: L'Harmattan. pp. 107–108. ISBN 978-2-343-00052-7.
- Thomas, Joseph (2009). The Universal Dictionary of Biography and Mythology (hardback). Vol. II. New York: Cosimo Classics. p. 939. ISBN 9781616400712.
- Trevor-Roper, Hugh (2006). Europe's Physician: The Various Life of Sir Theodore de Mayerne. New Haven: Yale University Press. p. 203. ISBN 0-300-11263-7.
- Voltaire, Jones, Charles L. S., tr. (1834). The Henriad; a poem; with the notes and variations. Tr. from the French of M. de Voltaire. By Charles L. S. Jones. Mobile: Sidney Smith. pp. 250–253.
- Wilson, Peter H. (2009). Europe's Tragedy: A New History of the Thirty Years War (hardback). London: Allen Lane. pp. 521, 532, 552, 560–1. ISBN 9780713995923.
