= Jean Florimond Boudon de Saint-Amans =

French naturalist and antiquarian

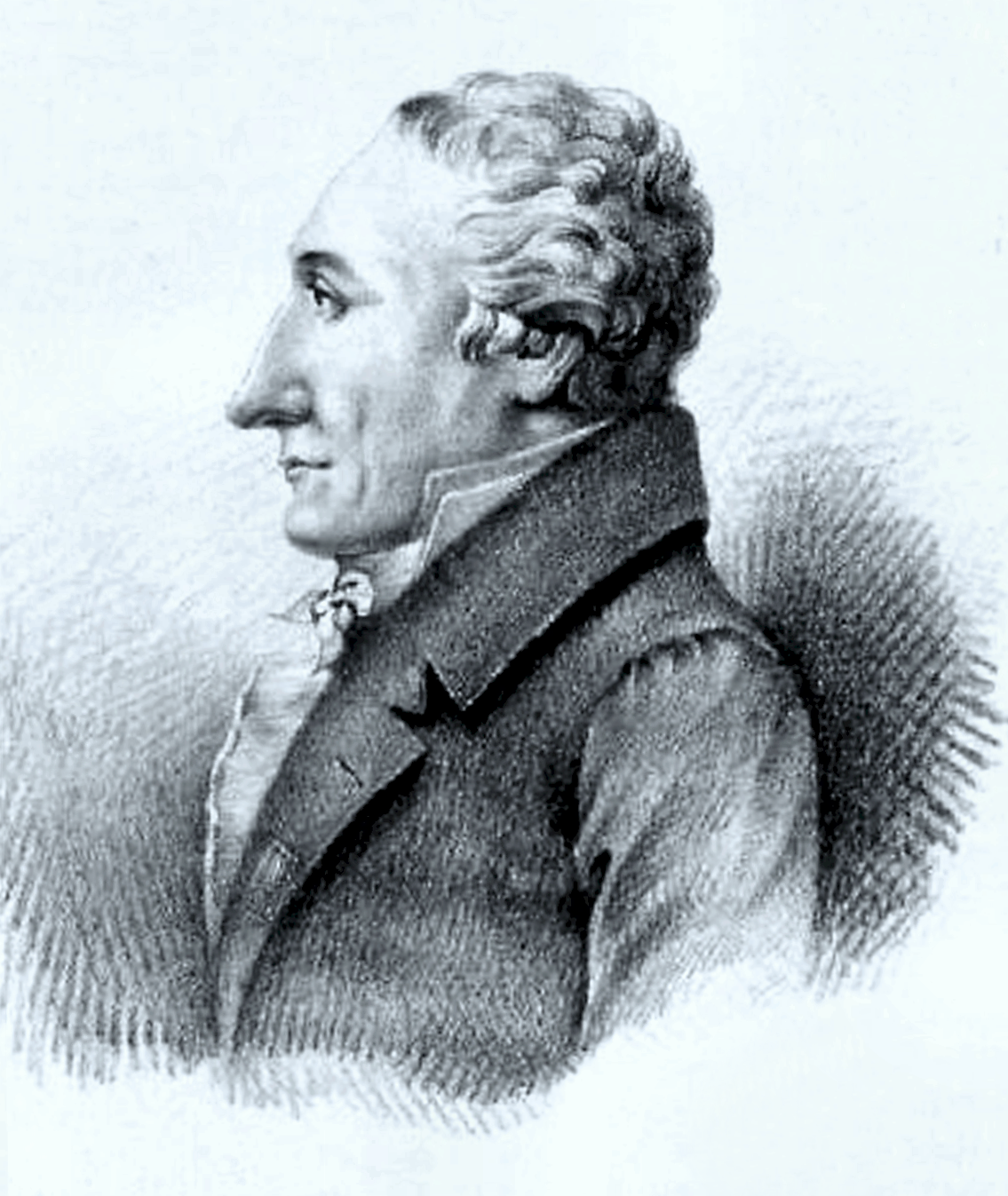
Jean Florimond Boudon de Saint-Amans

Jean Florimond Boudon de Saint-Amans (24 June 1748 in Agen – 28 October 1831 in Agen) was a French naturalist and antiquarian. He was the author of works involving agriculture, botany and antiquities.

At the age of 18 he joined the infantry regiment of Vermandois, of which he participated in journeys to the Caribbean. In 1773, he left the military, married a wealthy heiress, and moved back to his hometown of Agen. In 1794 he became a member of the board of agriculture to the Ministry of the Interior, and two years later was appointed professor of natural history at Ecole centrale de Lot-et-Garonne.

From 1800 until his death in 1831, he served a president of the General Council of Lot-et-Garonne.

== Principal writings ==
- Fragmens d'un voyage sentimental et pittoresque dans les Pyrénées ou Lettre écrite de ces montagnes, 1789 - Fragments from a journey in the Pyrenees, etc.
- Philosophie entomologique : ouvrage qui renferme les généralités nécessaires pour s'initier dans l'étude des insectes, 1798 - Entomological philosophy : Work containing the general necessities to initiate the study of insects.
- Description abrégée du département de Lot-et-Garonne, 1800 - Brief description of the department Lot-et-Garonne.
- Voyage agricole, botanique et pittoresque, dans une partie des Landes de Lot et Garonne, et de celles de la Gironde, 1812 - Agricultural travels, botanical and picturesque, in parts of Landes, Lot-et-Garonne and Gironde.
- Flore agenaise; ou, Description méthodique des plantes observées dans le département de Lot-et-Garonne et dans quelques parties des départemens voisins, 1821 - Flora of Agen or a methodical description of plants observed in the department of Lot-et-Garonne and in some parts of neighboring departments.
- Essai sur les antiquités du département de Lot-et-Garonne, 1859 - Essay on antiquities in the department of Lot-et-Garonne.
