= Henri Nompar de Caumont, 3rd Duke of La Force =

Duke of La Force

Henri Nompar de Caumont
- 3rd Duke of La Force; Marquis of Castelnau
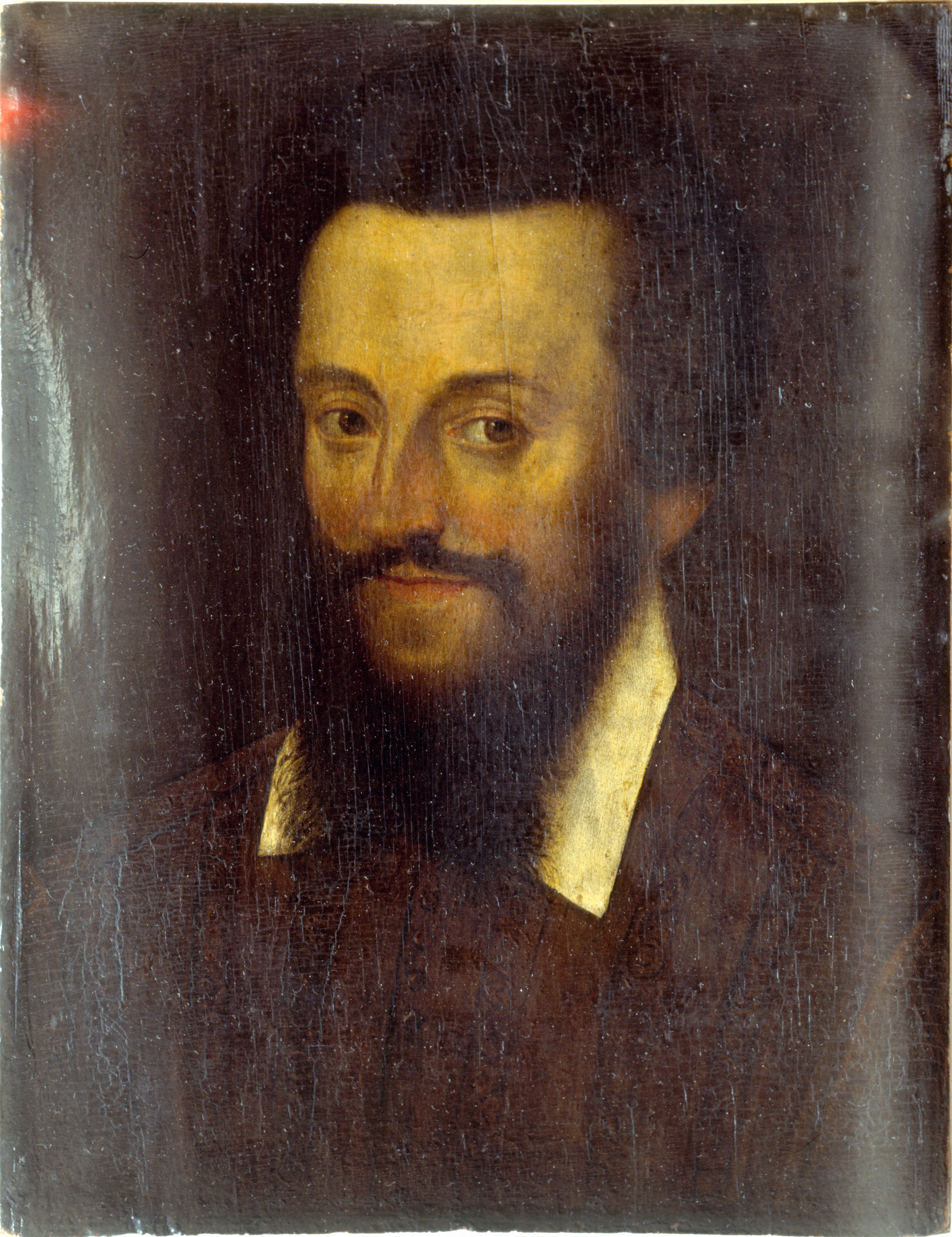
- Presumed portrait (musée Carnavalet)
- Born: 1582
- Died: January 1678 (aged 95–96)
- Noble family: Caumont
- Spouse: Marguerite d'Escodeca
- Issue: Jacques, marquis de Boësse; Henri; Pierre, Marquis of Cugnac; Armand, Marquis of Montpouillan; Charlotte; Diane; Jeanne; Jacqueline; Henriette
- Father: Jacques-Nompar de Caumont, duc de La Force
- Mother: Charlotte de Gontaut

Henri Nompar de Caumont, 3rd Duke of La Force (1582 – January 1678) was Duc de La Force and peer of France. He was the son of Marshal of France, Jacques-Nompar de Caumont, duc de La Force and Charlotte de Gontaut, daughter of Marshal Armand de Gontaut, baron de Biron. First marquis de Castelnau, later Duc de La Force after the death of his brother, he served King Louis XIII on many occasions in the army, under his father, as Maréchal-de-camp.

== Marriage and issue ==
He married 17 October 1602, Marguerite d'Escodeca, dame de Boësse, and by her had nine children:

- Jacques de Caumont La Force, marquis de Boësse, killed in the siege of La Mothe in Lorraine in 1634
- Henri de Caumont La Force, died young
- Pierre de Caumont La Force, marquis de Cugnac, without issue
- Armand de Caumont La Force, marquis de Montpouillan, Lieutenant-general in the Dutch Army, Governor of Naarden, died in The Hague on 16 May 1701 at the age of 86. He married Amable-Guillelmine de Brederode and Grace Angelique Arrazola de Oñate.
- Charlotte de Caumont La Force, married Gabriel de Caumont, comte de Lauzun, mother of Antoine Nompar de Caumont
- Diane de Caumont La Force, married Charles-René du Puy de Tournon, marquis de Montbrun en Dauphiné
- Jeanne de Caumont La Force, married Cyrus de Montaut, marquis de Navailles, seigneur de Beynac
- Jacqueline de Caumont La Force, died, 10 May 1702, married Henri de Vivant, comte de Panjas.
- Henriette de Caumont La Force, demoiselle de Castelnau

== Death ==
He died in January 1678 at the Château de La Force in the Dordogne, and was succeeded by his grandson, Jacques-Nompar.

== Sources ==
- Caumont, Jacques-Nompar de, Duc De La Force (1843). Mémoires authentiques de Jacques Nompar de Caumont, duc de La Force, maréchal de France, et de ses deux fils, les marquis de Montpouillan et de Castelnaut ... Vol. IV. Paris: Charpentier.
- "Les derniers seigneurs de Caumont". Histoire de Caumont. Mariefb.pagesperso–orange.fr.
- Moréri, Louis (1759). Le Grand Dictionnaire Historique du Moréri ou le Mélange Curieux de l'Histoire Sacrée et Profane. Vol. 5 (1759 ed.). Geneva: Slatkine Reprints. p. 246. ISBN 2-05-101303-9.
- Sainte-Marie, Anselme de and Sainte-Rosalie, Ange de (1728). Histoire de la Maison Royale de France, et des grands officiers de la Couronne & de la Maison de Roy: & des anciens Barons de Royaume. Vol. IV (3rd ed.). Paris: Compaignies des Libraires. pp. 472–473.
- Wood, John Philip (2009). The Life of John Law: Including a Detailed Account of the Rise, Progress and Termination of the Mississippi System. Washington: Newton Page. p. 84. ISBN 9781934619018.
