= Dukes in France =

Hereditary noble title until 19th century

Duke Duc
- Heraldic depiction of a duke's coronet
- Peerage: France

The title of Duke (French: Duc) was the highest hereditary title in the French nobility during the time of the monarchy in France. The title continued to be granted by French presidents until the 19th century.

== Old dukedoms ==
The highest precedence in the realm, attached to a feudal territory, was given to the twelve original pairies, which had originated in the Middle Ages and also had a traditional function in the royal coronation, comparable to the German imperial archoffices.

Half of them were Dukes and half of them Counts. Of these, three were ecclesiastical and three were secular. Of these twelve, the prelates all ranked above the secular peers of the realm and three temporal, and the dukes all ranked above the counts.

=== Ecclesiastical Dukes ===
The Prince-Bishops with ducal territories included:

- The Archbishop of Reims, styled archevêque-duc pair de France (in Champagne; who crown and anoint the king, traditionally in his cathedral)
- Two suffragan bishops, styled evêque-duc pair de France :
  - the bishop-duc de Laon (in Picardy; bears the 'Sainte Ampoule' containing the sacred ointment)
  - the bishop-duc de Langres (in Burgundy; bears the scepter)

Later, the Archbishop of Paris was given the title of duc de Saint-Cloud with the dignity of peerage, but it was debated if he was an ecclesiastical peer or merely a bishop holding a lay peerage.

=== Secular dukes ===
Under the House of Capet there were five laic duchies:

- Duke of Normandy, peer of France: mightiest vassal of the French crown, later also kings of England. By privilege, they cannot be summoned by the King of France beyond the borders of the duchy of Normandy; King John of England had attempted to invoke this privilege to avoid the summons of Philip Augustus to his court in Paris. Merged into the French crown, circa 1204.
- Duke of Aquitaine, peer of France: largest landholder of southwestern France, also rulers of Gascony and Poitou. Merged into the French crown, circa 1204. Reconstituted as the duchy of Guyenne in 1259 for the King of England by Saint Louis.
- Duke of Burgundy, peer of France: held by a cadet line of the Kings of France. At some point the duke of Burgundy gained precedence over those of Normandy (then merged with the Crown) and Aquitaine (held by a disobedient vassal) in the French coronation ceremony.
- Duke of Brittany: a vassal of the Duke of Normandy. Promoted to the peerage of France in 1297 by Philip the Fair.
- Duke of Bourbon: originally a lordship, raised to the status of a duchy-peerage by Charles IV in 1327.

== Early Modern period ==
At the end of the 13th century, the King elevated some counties into duchies, a practice that increased through the early modern period until the French Revolution. Many of these duchies were also peerages, so-called new peerages.

Ducal titles traditionally held by princes of the royal blood:

- Duke of Orléans
- Duke of Anjou
- Duke of Berry
- Duke of Angoulême
- Duke of Alençon
- Duke of Touraine

Other notable ducal titles:

- Duke of Guise
- Duke of Lorraine
- Duke of Montpensier
- Duke of Savoy (although Haute Savoie is now part of France, the Dukes of Savoy were Princes of the Holy Roman Empire, not peers of France)

The title of Duke of France refers to the rulers of the Île de France, informally Francia. The dynasts of Robert the Strong's family are usually termed "Dukes of France" and their title evolved into the name for the French nation after one of their members, Hugh Capet, ascended the throne. Since the end of the monarchy, it has been used by pretenders to the French throne such as Jean, Count of Paris

== New dukedoms ==
After the French Revolution, further dukedoms were created by successive French rulers. Napoleon I created a substantial number of dukes in the nobility of the First French Empire, largely for Marshals of the Empire and certain ministers, and many of them carried victory titles. The practice of creating dukedoms was continued by the House of Bourbon after the Restoration, and later by Napoleon III.

== Duke and Peer ==
The title of "duke and peer" (Fr: duc et pair) is one of the highest honors in the French nobility, ranking just after the princes of the blood, which are themselves the direct descendants of the royal blood and are considered peers by birth.

The peers of the Middle Ages and of the modern period were not descended from the peers, or paladins, Carolingian heroes of song. They were descended from the great possessors of fiefs, members of the curia regis, since the duty to advise was vassalic obligation.

The ancient peerages of France were twelve: six were ecclesiastical and six were lay; six were counts and six were dukes. The ecclesiastical peers, joined in 1690 by the Archbishop of Paris, Duke of Saint-Cloud, François Harlay, survived intact until the Revolution of 1789. In contrast the original lay peerages disappeared with the gradual annexation of their territories to the royal domain. The peerage was then at the disposal of royalty who granted the dignity to his faithful servants. The creations (erections) were particularly numerous in the 17th and 18th centuries (19 from 1590–1660 and 15 from 1661–1723). Some families accumulated peerages, and in 1723, 38 families had 52 peerages. From the 17th century the peerage was conferred only to dukes. In 1789, there were 43 peers of which 6 were princes of the blood.

Peerage was normally hereditary in the male line, though the king could extend it to the female line and even to the collateral lines. It was extinguished with aristocratic lineage that had benefited from the creation. Ecclesiastical peerages were transmitted to the next holder of the episcopal see.

Since 1667, the political power of the peers was much reduced; they no longer attended the King's Council. In contrast, they could, when they wished, attend the sessions of the Parlement of Paris, where they could carry a sword to the chagrin of judges. They sat on the right of the First President in the order of their dignity and the date of the creation of their peerage. Except for lit de justice, they were first to give their opinion after the presidents and councilors of parliament.

The dignity was largely ceremonial. Peers occupied a spot directly below the members of the royal family (children and grandchildren of France and princes of the blood). The king addressed them "my cousin", and were called Monseigneur or Votre grandeur. They could dance with members of the royal family, enter the royal castles in their carriages, and duchesses were entitled to tabouret when with the queen. They participated in the king's coronation, if there were no princes of the blood or legitimated princes. The Duke of Saint-Simon is the greatest representative of peer attachment to their dignity; he fiercely defended their rights against encroachment.

The revenues of peers consisted of feudal dues, property income, salaries for functions exercised at Court and pensions granted by the king. In the 18th century the peerage became a caste, with over half of matrimonial alliances taking place between similarly-ranked families.

== See also ==
- Peerage of France
- List of French dukedoms
- List of French peerages
- List of French peers
- List of coats of arms of French peers
