= Armorial of French peers =

Crown of the duke-peers of France

Crown and mantle of the duke-peers of France (represented here with the collars of the Orders of the King — the Order of the Holy Spirit and the Order of Saint Michael).

The peerage of France consists of the great officers, direct vassals of the Crown of France, with the title peer of France. They represent the primitive constituents of elective monarchy, before the succession became hereditary in the House of Capet.

== Primitive peers ==
They were probably, at the time of the Frankish monarchy, the great princes and vassals who were called to choose a successor to king among the eligible princes to the crown.

Since 1180, they were responsible for ensuring the succession and were involved in the ceremony of coronation where each represents a symbolic function of the nomination.

=== Ecclesiastical peers ===
Figure	Peer and blazon	Function at the Coronation
	The Archbishop-Duke of Reims, Azure, seme-de-lys or, a cross argent.	Anoints and crowns the King
	The Bishop-Duke of Laon, Azure, seme-de-lys or, on a cross argent, a crozier gules.	Bears the Holy Ampulla
	The Bishop-Duke of Langres, Azure, seme-de-lys or, a saltire gules.	Bears the royal scepter
	The Bishop-Count of Beauvais, Or, a cross between four keys gules.	Bears the royal mantle
	The Bishop-Count of Châlons, Azure, seme-de-lys or, a cross gules.	Bears the royal ring
	The Bishop-Count of Noyon, Azure, seme-de-lys or, two croziers addorsed argent.	Bears the royal belt

=== Lay Peers ===
Figure	Peer and blazon	Function at the Coronation
	The Duke of Burgundy (province returned to the royal domain in 1477), Bendy of six or and azure, à a bordure gules.	Bears the royal crown, girds the sword to the King and confers the Order of chivalry
	The Duke of Normandy (province returned to the royal domain in 1204), Gules, two lions passant or (armed and langued azure).	Holds the first square banner
	The Duke of Aquitaine (province returned to the royal domain in 1453), Gules, a lion passant or (armed and langued azure).	Holds the second square banner
	The Count of Flanders (province ceded in 1526 by the Treaty of Madrid which was not ratified, and finally, in 1559 by the Treaty of Cateau-Cambrésis), Or, a lion sable, armed and langued gules.	Bears Joyeuse, the sword of the King
	The Count of Champagne (province returned to royal domain in 1314), Azure a bend argent double cottised potent counter-potent or.	Bears the King's war banner
	The Count of Toulouse (province returned to the royal domain in 1229 and 1271), Gules a cross cleché, voided and pommety of twelve pieces or.	Carries the royal spurs

== Later peerages ==
=== Peerages created in the 13th century ===
In 1297, Philip IV of France created three new peerages, to replace some of the lay peerages which had merged into the crown (Normandy and Toulouse; while Champagne was held by Philip IV's wife, Joan I of Navarre). All three new peerages were created for nobles of Capetian descent.

Figure	Peer and blazon	Grantee
	The Duke of Brittany, peerage in 1297 (duchy returned to royal domain in 1547), Chequy or and azure a bordure gules and a canton ermine. Since 1316: Ermine.	John II, Duke of Brittany
	The Count of Anjou, peerage in 1297, extinct in 1328 Azure seme-de-lys or a bordure gules.	Charles, Count of Valois
	The Count of Artois, peerage in 1297, extinct in 1526 Azure seme-de-lys or a label gules, each point charged with three castles or.	Robert II, Count of Artois

=== Peerages created in the 14th century ===
Peerages created in the 14th century were for princes of the royal blood, most of which were for the Valois princes. One was created for the Count of Flanders.

Figure	Peer and blazon	Grantee
	The Count of Poitiers, county-peerage created in 1314, Azure seme-de-lys or a label compony gules and argent, or France, a label compony gules and argent.	Philip the Tall, later Philip V of France
	The Count of La Marche, county-peerage created in 1316, Azure seme-de-lys or a bordure compony gules and argent, or France, a bordure compony gules and argent.	Charles the Fair, later Charles IV of France
	The Count of Évreux, county-peerage created in 1316, Azure seme-de-lys or a bend compony argent and gules.	Louis, Count of Évreux
	The Count of Angoulême, county-peerage created in 1317, Quarterly Evreux and Navarre.	Philip III of Navarre
	The Count of La Marche, county-peerage created in 1321,	Louis I, Duke of Bourbon
	The Duke of Bourbon, duchy-peerage created in 1327, Azure seme-de-lys or a bend gules.	Louis I, Duke of Bourbon
	The Count of Étampes, county-peerage created in 1327, Azure seme-de-lys or a bend compony ermine and gules.	Charles of Étampes
	The Count of Beaumont-le-Roger, county-peerage created in 1328, Azure seme-de-lys or a label gules, each point charged with three castles or.	Robert III of Artois
	The Count of Maine, county-peerage created in 1331,	John the Good, later John II of France
	The Duke of Normandy, duchy-peerage created in 1332, Azure seme-de-lys or a bordure gules.	John the Good, later John II of France
	The Duke of Orléans, duchy-peerage created in 1344, Azure seme-de-lys or a label compony gules and argent, or France, a label compony gules and argent. The holder of the fief was also: Count of Valois, county-peerage created in 1344,	Philip, Duke of Orléans
	The Count of Nevers, county-peerage created in 1347, Or a lion sable armed and langued gules.	Louis II, Count of Flanders (1330 † 1384)
	The Count of Mantes, county-peerage created in 1353,	Charles II of Navarre
	The Count of Beaumont-le-Roger, county-peerage created in 1354, Quarterly Navarre and Evreux.	Charles II of Navarre
	The Duke of Anjou, duchy-peerage created in 1356, Azure seme-de-lys or, a bordure gules.	Louis I, Duke of Anjou
	The Count of Poitou, county-peerage created in 1357,	John, Duke of Berry
	The Count of Mâcon, county-peerage created in 1359, Azure seme-de-lys or, a bordure engrailed gules.	John, Duke of Berry
	The Count of Maine, county-peerage created in 1360, Azure seme-de-lys or, a bordure gules.	Louis I, Duke of Anjou
	The Duke of Berry, duchy-peerage created in 1360, Azure seme-de-lys or, a bordure engrailed gules. The holder of the fief was also: The Duke of Auvergne, duchy-peerage created in 1360,	John, Duke of Berry
	The Duke of Touraine, county-peerage created in 1360, Azure seme-de-lys or a bordure compony argent and gules.	Philip the Bold
	The Duke of Burgundy, duchy-peerage created in 1363, Quarterly 1 and 4 azure seme-de-lys or a bordure compony argent and gules, 2 and 3 bendy of six or and azure a bordure gules.	Philip the Bold
	The Lord of Montpellier, barony-peerage created in 1371, Quarterly Navarre and Evreux.	Charles II of Navarre
	The Duke of Touraine, duchy-peerage in 1386,	Louis I, Duke of Orléans
	The Duke of Orléans, duchy-peerage in 1392, The holder of the fief was also: Count of Valois, duchy-peerage created in 1392,	Louis I, Duke of Orléans
	The Count of Périgord, county-peerage in 1399, Azure three fleurs de lys or, a label argent.	Louis I, Duke of Orléans

=== Peerages created in the 15th century ===
In the fifteenth century, Charles VII began granting peerages to foreigners, to his Scottish allies in particular.

Figure	Peer and blazon	Grantee
	The Duke of Touraine, duchy-peerage created in 1401, Azure three fleurs-de-lys or a bordure engrailed argent and gules.	John, Duke of Touraine
	The Duke of Alençon, duchy-peerage created in 1404, Azure seme-de-lys or a bordure gules charged with eight plates.	Jean I, Duke of Alençon
	The Count of Soissons, county-peerage created in 1404, Azure three fleurs de lys or, a label argent. The holder of the fief was also: Lord of Coucy, barony-peerage created in 1404,	Louis I, Duke of Orléans
	The Duke of Nemours, duchy-peerage created in 1404, Quarterly in I and IV gules chains or in orle, in cross and in saltire, an emerald proper, in II and III azure seme-de-lys or a bend compony argent and gules.	Charles III of Navarre
	The Count of Rethel, county-peerage in created 1405, Quarterly, in I and IV azure three fleurs-de-lys or a bordure compony argent and gules, II sable a lion rampant or armed and langued gules and III argent a lion rampant gules armed, langued and crowned or.	Anthony, Duke of Brabant
	The Duke of Valois, duchy-peerage created in 1406, Azure three fleurs de lys or, a label argent.	Louis I, Duke of Orléans
	The Count of Mortagne, county-peerage created in 1407, Azure seme-de-lys or a bordure engrailed compony argent and gules.	John, Duke of Touraine
	The Count of Mortain, county-peerage created in 1407, Quarterly in I and IV gules chains or in orle, in cross and in saltire, charged with an emerald proper, in II and III azure seme-de-lys or a bend compony argent and gules, a bordure argent.	Peter of Navarre, son of Charles II of Navarre
	The Count of Mortain, county-peerage created in 1414,	Louis, Duke of Guyenne
	The Duke of Berry, duchy-peerage created in 1416, Quarterly France and Dauphine.	John, Duke of Touraine
	The Duke of Touraine, duchy-peerage created in 1416,	Charles, Duke of Touraine, later Charles VII of France
	The Duke of Berry, duchy-peerage created in 1417, Azure seme-de-lys or a bordure engrailed compony argent and gules.	Charles, Duke of Touraine, later Charles VII of France
	The Duke of Touraine, duchy-peerage created in 1423, Argent a heart gules, on a chief azure three mullets argent.	Archibald Douglas, 4th Earl of Douglas
	The Count of Évreux, county-peerage created in 1424, Quarterly: in I and IV azure three fleurs de lys or, a bordure gules charged with eight buckles or; in II and III or, a fess chequy argent and azure (Stuart) a cottice gules.	John Stuart, Constable of the Army of Scotland
	The Count of Saintonge, county-peerage created in 1428, Or a lion rampant within a double tressure flory counter-flory gules.	James I of Scotland
	The Count of Foix, county-peerage created in 1458, Quarterly: in I, gules, chains or, in orle, in cross and in saltire; in II, or, three pallets gules; in III, or, two cows, horned, collared and belled azure; in IV, seme-de-lys or, a bend compony argent and gules; overall or two lions passant guardant gules, armed and langued Azure.	Gaston IV, Count of Foix
	The Count of Eu, county-peerage created in 1458, Azure seme-de-lys or a label gules, each point charged with three castles or.	Charles of Artois, Count of Eu
	The Count of Nevers, county-peerage created in 1459, Quarterly 1 and 4 azure seme-de-lys or a bordure compony argent and gules, 2 and 3 or a lion rampant sable armed and langued gules.	Charles I, Count of Nevers
	The Duke of Berry, duchy-peerage created in 1461, Azure three fleurs-de-lys or a bordure engrailed gules.	Charles, Duke of Berry
	The Count of Nevers, county-peerage created in 1464, Quarterly Valois-Burgundy and Artois.	John II, Count of Nevers
	The Duke of Normandy, duchy-peerage created in 1465, Quarterly azure three fleurs-de-lys or a bordure engrailed gules and Normandy. The holder of the fief was also: Count of Mortain, county-peerage created in 1465	Charles, Duke of Berry
	The Duke of Guyenne, duchy-peerage created in 1469, Quarterly azure three fleurs-de-lys or a bordure engrailed gules and Guyenne.	Charles, Duke of Berry
	The Count of Villefranche, county-peerage created in 1480, Quarterly 1 and 4 Aragon, 2 and 3 tierced in pale Hungary, Anjou-Sicily and Jerusalem.	Frederick of Naples
	The Duke of Valois, duchy-peerage created in 1498, Azure, three fleurs-de-lys or, a label argent of three points, each point charged with a crescent gules.	Francis of Angouleme, later Francis I of France

=== Peerages created in the 16th century ===
Figure	Peer and blazon	Grantee
	The Count of Nevers, county-peerage created in 1505, Per fess, 1 per pale gules an escutcheon argent an escarbuncle or, 2 or a fess chequy argent and gules, and azure three fleurs-de-lys or a bordure compony argent and gules.	Engelbert, Count of Nevers
	The Count of Soissons, county-peerage created in 1505, Quarterly France and Brittany. The holder of the title was also: Lord of Coucy, barony-peerage created in 1505	Claude of France
	The Duke of Nemours, duchy-peerage created in 1507, Quarterly or three pallets gules and or two cows gules horned, collared and belled azure. Inescutcheon or, two lions passant gules armed and langued azure.	Gaston of Foix, Duke of Nemours
	The Duke of Angoulême, duchy-peerage created in 1515, Gules a cross argent. The holder of the title was also: Duke of Anjou, duchy-peerage created in 1515,	Louise of Savoy
	The Duke of Vendôme, duchy-peerage created in 1515, Azure three fleurs de lys or and a bend gules charged with three lions rampants argent.	Charles IV de Bourbon
	The Duke of Châtellerault, duchy-peerage created in 1515, Quarterly azure three fleurs-de-lys or a bend gules and or a dolphin azure.	François, Duke of Châtellerault, son of Gilbert, Count of Montpensier
	The Duke of Valois, duchy-peerage created in 1516, Azure three fleurs-de-lys or a label argent on each point a crescent gules	Jeanne d'Orleans, daughter of John, Count of Angoulême
	The Duke of Berry, duchy-peerage created in 1517, Azure three fleurs-de-lys or	Marguerite d'Orleans
	The Duke of Nemours, duchy-peerage created in 1524,	Louise of Savoy
	The Duke of Bourbon, duchy-peerage created in 1527, The holder of the title was also: Duke of Châtellerault, duchy-peerage created in 1527	Louise of Savoy
	The Duke of Auvergne, duchy-peerage created in 1528, Gules a cross argent.	Louise of Savoy
	The Duke of Guise, duchy-peerage created in 1528, Per fess and per three pallets, 1 barry gules and argent, 2 azure seme-de-lys or and a label gules, 3 argent a cross potent or, between four crosslets of the same, 4 or four pallets gules, 5 azure seme-de-lys or and a bordure gules, 6 azure a lion contourny or, armed, langued and crowned gules, 7 or a lion sable armed and langued gules, 8 azure crusilly or and two bars or. Inescutcheon or a bend gules charged with three alerions argent. Overall a label gules.	Claude de Lorraine
	The Duke of Châtellerault, duchy-peerage created in 1530, Gules a cross argent.	Louise of Savoy
	The Duke of Nevers, duchy-peerage created in 1539, Per fess 1 quarterly azure three fleurs-de-lys or and gules, and 2 azure three fleurs-de-lys or a bordure compony argent and gules.	Marie d'Albret, Countess of Rethel
	The Duke of Montpensier, duchy-peerage created in 1539, Quarterly, in 1 and 4 azure three fleurs de lys or and a bend gules and in 2 and 3 or a dolphin azure.	Louise de Bourbon, Duchess of Montpensier
	The Duke of Orleans, duchy-peerage created in 1540, The holder of the title was also: Duke of Angouleme, duchy-peerage created in 1540, Duke of Châtellerault, duchy-peerage created in 1540, Count of Clermont, county-peerage created in 1540, Count of La Marche, county-peerage created in 1540,	Charles II de Valois, Duke of Orléans
	The Duke of Bourbon, duchy-peerage created in 1544, Azure three fleurs de lys or a label argent.	Charles II de Valois, Duke of Orléans
	The Duke of Aumale, duchy-peerage created in 1547, Quarterly, in I and IV per fess and per three pallets, 1 barry gules and argent, 2 azure seme-de-lys or and a label gules, 3 argent a cross potent or, between four crosslets of the same, 4 or four pallets gules, 5 per pale azure seme-de-lys or and a bordure gules, 6 azure a lion contourny or, armed, langued and crowned gules, 7 or a lion sable armed and langued gules, 8 azure crusilly or and two bars or. Inescutcheon or a bend gules charged with three alerions argent overall a label and a bordure gules; and in II and III azure three fleurs de lys or and a bendlet couped gules.	Claude de Lorraine
	The Duke of Berry, duchy-peerage created in 1550, Azure three fleurs-de-lys or.	Margaret of France, Duchess of Berry
	The Duke of Montmorency, duchy-peerage created in 1551, Or a cross gules between sixteen alerions azure.	Anne de Montmorency (1492-1567)
	The Duke of Albret, duchy-peerage created in 1550, Per two pallets and per fess: 1, gules chains or in orle, in cross and in saltire, an emerald proper; in 2, quarterly in 1 and 4 azure three fleurs de lys or and in 2 and 3 gules; in 3, or four pallets gules; in 4, quarterly in 1 and 4 or three pallets gules, in 2 and 3 or two cows gules, horned, collared and belled azure, passant in pale; in 5, azure seme-de-lys or a bend compony argent and gules; and in 6, per saltire 1 and 3 or four pallets gules, 2 gules a castle or port and windows azure and 4 argent a lion gules armed, langued and crowned or; inescutcheon or two lions passant guardant gules, armed and langued azure, in pale.	Henry II of Navarre
	The Duke of Anjou, duchy-peerage created in 1566, Azure, three fleurs-de-lys or a label gules. The holder of the title was also: Duke of Bourbon, duchy-peerage created in 1566, Count of Forez, county-peerage created in 1566,	Henry, Duke of Anjou, later Henry III of France
	The Duke of Alençon, duchy-peerage created in 1566, Azure three fleurs de lys or a bordure gules charged with eight plates. The holder of the title was also: Duke of Chateau-Thierry, duchy-peerage created in 1566, Count of Perche, county-peerage created in 1566, Count of Meulan, county-peerage created in 1566, Count of Mantes, county-peerage created in 1566,	Francis, Duke of Alençon
	The Duke of Auvergne, duchy-peerage created in 1569, Azure, three fleurs-de-lys or a label gules.	Henry, Duke of Anjou, later Henry III of France
	The Duke of Penthièvre, duchy-peerage created in 1569, Argent a lion gules tail forked in saltire, armed, langued and crowned or.	Sébastien, Duke of Penthièvre
	The Duke of Evreux, duchy-peerage created in 1569, Azure three fleurs de lys or a bordure gules charged with eight plates. The holder of the title was also: Count of Dreux, county-peerage created in 1569,	Francis, Duke of Alençon
	The Duke of Mercœur, duchy-peerage created in 1569, Per fess and per three pallets, 1 barry gules and argent, 2 azure seme-de-lys or and a label gules, 3 argent a cross potent or, between four crosslets of the same, 4 or four pallets gules 5 per pale azure seme-de-lys or and a bordure gules, 6 azure a lion contourny or, armed, langued and crowned gules, 7 or a lion sable armed and langued gules, 8 azure crusilly or and two bars or. Inescutcheon or a bend gules charged with three alerions argent overall a label Azure.	Nicolas de Lorraine (1524 † 1577)
	The Duke of Uzès, duchy-peerage created in 1572, Quarterly: in 1 and 4, per pale: a. barry or and vert (Crussol); b. or three chevrons sable (Levis); in 2 and 3, quarterly, azure three mullets or, in pale (Gourdon), and or three bends gules (Genouillac). Overall gules three bends or (Uzès).	Antoine de Crussol
	The Duke of Mayenne, duchy-peerage created in 1573, Quarterly, in 1 and 4: per fess and per three pallets, 1 barry gules and argent, 2 azure seme-de-lys or and a label gules, 3 argent a cross potent or, between four crosslets of the same, 4 or four pallets gules 5 per pale azure seme-de-lys or and a bordure gules, 6 azure a lion contourny or, armed, langued and crowned gules, 7 or a lion sable armed and langued gules, 8 azure crusilly or and two bars or. Inescutcheon or a bend gules charged with three alerions argent overall a label gules; in 2 and 3 quarterly in 1 and 4 Azure, an eagle argent, beaked, langued and crowned or and in 2 and 3 Azure, three fleurs de lys or, a bordure indented gules and or.	Charles, Duke of Mayenne
	The Duke of Saint-Fargeau, duchy-peerage created in 1574, Azure three fleurs de lys or a bendlet gules couped charged with a crescent argent in chief.	François, Duke of Montpensier
	The Duke of Anjou, duchy-peerage created in 1576, Azure three fleurs de lys or a bordure gules. The holder of the title was also: Duke of Touraine, duchy-peerage created in 1576, Duke of Berry, duchy-peerage created in 1576,	Francis, Duke of Alençon
	The Duke of Joyeuse, duchy-peerage created in 1581, Quarterly in 1 and 4 paly or and azure of six pieces, a chief gules charged with three hydras of seven heads also or and in 2 and 3 azure a lion argent a bordure gules charged with fleurs de lys or.	Anne de Joyeuse
	The Duke of Piney-Luxembourg, duchy-peerage created in 1581, Argent a lion gules tail forked in saltire, armed, langued and crowned or.	François de Luxembourg († 1613)
	The Duke of Épernon, duchy-peerage created in 1581, Per pale argent a walnut eradicated vert and gules, a cross or, couped, voided, cleché and pommety of twelve pieces; a chief gules charged with a cross potent argent; overall below the chief, azure a bell argent clapper sable (de Bellegarde).	Jean Louis de Nogaret de La Valette
	The Duke of Elbeuf, duchy-peerage created in 1581, Per fess and per three pallets, 1 barry gules and argent, 2 azure seme-de-lys or and a label gules, 3 argent a cross potent or, between four crosslets of the same, 4 or four pallets gules 5 per pale azure seme-de-lys or and a bordure gules, 6 azure a lion contourny or, armed, langued and crowned gules, 7 or a lion sable armed and langued gules, 8 azure crusilly or and two bars or. Inescutcheon or a bend gules charged with three alerions argent overall a label and a bordure gules.	Charles I, Duke of Elbeuf
	The Duke of Retz, duchy-peerage created in 1581, Or two maces sable in saltire, tied gules.	Albert de Gondi
	The Duke of Rethel, duchy-peerage created in 1581, Quarterly; 1 argent, a cross patty gules between four eagles sable displayed and affronty; Overall, Quarterly, 1 and 4 barry or and sable, 2 and 3 gules a lion argent tail forked, armed and langued or, crowned and collared of the same, a bendlet couped; 2 d’Alençon; 3 de Bourgogne; 4 de Clèves charged in fess point de La Marck; Overall d’Albret d’Orval.	Louis de Gonzague, duc de Nevers
	The Duke of Hallwin, duchy-peerage created in 1587, Argent three lions sable armed, langued and crowned or.	Charles de Hallwin
	The Duke of Montbazon, duchy-peerage created in 1588, Quarterly: in I and IV, gules nine mascles or, 3,3,3 (de Rohan); in II, gules chains or in orle, in cross and in saltire, an emerald proper (de Navarre); in III, azure three fleurs de lys or, a bend compony argent and gules (d'Evreux modern); overall, argent, a biscione in pale azure, crowned or, devouring a child carnation, fesswise, arms extended (de Visconti).	Louis VII de Rohan
	The Duke of Ventadour, duchy-peerage created in 1589, Quarterly: in I, gules three bends or; in II, or three chevrons gules; in III, gules three mullets or; IV, argent a lion gules armed and langued or; overall, chequy or and gules.	Gilbert III de Lévis
	The Duke of Montbazon, duchy-peerage created in 1588, Quarterly: in I and IV, gules nine mascles or, 3,3,3 (de Rohan); in II, gules chains or in orle, in cross and in saltire, an emerald proper (de Navarre); in III, azure three fleurs de lys or, a bend compony argent and gules (d'Evreux modern); overall, argent, a biscione in pale azure, crowned or, devouring a child carnation, fesswise, arms extended (de Visconti).	Hercule, Duke of Montbazon
	The Duke of Thouars, duchy-peerage created in 1589, Quarterly: 1 and 4, or, a chevron gules, between three eagles Azure, beaked and membered gules (La Trémoille); 2 or seme-de-lys azure a franc-canton gules (Thouars), and 3, or lozengy gules (Craon), inescutcheon gules two lions passant guardant or.	Claude de La Trémoille
	The Duke of Beaufort, duchy-peerage created in 1597, Argent fretty sable, on a chief or three martlets sable.	Gabrielle d'Estrées
	The Duke of Vendome, duchy-peerage created in 1598, Azure, three fleurs-de-lys or, on a bend couped, three lions argent.	César, Duke of Vendôme
	The Duke of Biron, duchy-peerage created in 1598, Quarterly or and gules, the shield in a banner.	Charles de Gontaut-Biron

=== Peerages created in the 17th century ===
Figure	Peer and blazon	Grantee
	The Duke of Aiguillon, duchy-peerage created in 1600 (returned to the crown in 1635 by Richelieu), Quarterly, in 1 and 4: per fess and per three pallets, 1 barry gules and argent, 2 azure seme-de-lys or and a label gules, 3 argent a cross potent or, between four crosslets of the same, 4 or four pallets gules 5 per pale azure seme-de-lys or and a bordure gules, 6 azure a lion contourny or, armed, langued and crowned gules, 7 or a lion sable armed and langued gules, 8 azure crusilly or and two bars or. Inescutcheon or a bend gules charged with three alerions argent overall a label gules; in 2 and 3 quarterly in 1 and 4 azure, an eagle argent, beaked, langued and crowned or and in 2 and 3 Azure, three fleurs de lys or, a bordure indented gules and or.	Henry of Lorraine, Duke of Mayenne
	The Duke of Rohan, duchy-peerage created in 1603, Gules nine mascles or, set 3, 3, 3.	Henri, Duke of Rohan
	The Duke of Sully, duchy-peerage created in 1606, Argent a fess gules.	Maximilien de Béthune, Duke of Sully
	The Duke of Fronsac, duchy-peerage created in 1608, Quarterly: I and IV, azure three fleurs de lys or differenced by a label of three points argent and a bendlet sinister couped of the same (d'Orléans-Longueville modern); II and III, azure three fleurs de lys or a bendlet couped gules (de Bourbon modern).	François d'Orléans-Longueville, duc de Fronsac
	The Duke of Montpensier, duchy-peerage created in 1608, Azure three fleurs-de-lys or, on the chief of a bendlet couped gules, a crescent argent.	Marie de Bourbon
	The Duke of Damville, duchy-peerage created in 1610, Or a cross gules between sixteen alerions azure set 2 and 2, differenced by a label gules.	Charles de Montmorency-Damville
	The Duke of Hallwin, duchy-peerage created in 1611, Quarterly: in I, quarterly in 1 and 4, gules a castle or port and windows azure (Castille), in 2 and 3 argent a lion purpure armed, langued and crowned or (León); in II, quarterly in 1 and 4, gules chains or in orle, in cross and in saltire, an emerald proper (Navarre), in 2 and 3 per saltire or four pallets gules (Aragon) and argent an eagle sable (Hohenstaufen-Sicily); in III quarterly in 1 and 4 azure three fleurs de lys or and in 2 and 3 gules (Albret); in IV per pale in a, azure seme-de-lys or a bend compony argent and gules (Evreux), in b, per pale argent a walnut eradicated vert and gules, a cross or, couped, voided, cleché and pommety of twelve pieces; a chief gules charged with a cross potent argent (Nogaret); overall, quarterly in 1 and 4 or three pallets gules (Foix) in 2 and 3 or two cows gules, horned, collared and belled Azure, passant in pale (Béarn).	Henry de Nogaret de La Valette
	The Duke of Châteauroux, duchy-peerage created in 1616, Azure three fleurs de lys or and a bendlet couped gules.	Henri II, Prince of Condé
	The Duke of Luynes, duchy-peerage created in 1619, Quarterly: in 1 and 4, or, a lion gules, crowned of the same (Albert); in 2 and 3, Azure, two wolves affronty argent (Segur). Overall gules a mace or, a chief of the same, charged with a gonfanon gules (Sarras.)	Charles d'Albert
	The Duke of Lesdiguières, duchy-peerage created in 1611, registered 1620, Gules, a lion or, armed and langued Azure, a chief Azure, charged with three roses argent, seeded or and leaved vert.	François de Bonne de Lesdiguières
	The Duke of Brissac, duchy-peerage created in 1611, registered 1620, Sable, three bars indented in base part or.	Charles II de Cossé
	The Duke of Bellegarde, duchy-peerage created in 1620, Quarterly in 1 azure a lion or crowned of the same (Saint-Lary) in 2 or four pallets gules (de la Barthe) in 3 gules a vase or (Orbessan) in 4 azure three flames argent issuant from the base (Termes) Overall azure a bell argent clapper sable (Algoursan).	Roger de Saint-Lary de Termes
	The Duke of Hallwin, duchy-peerage created in 1620, registered 1621, Or, a lion per fess gules and vert.	Charles de Schomberg
	The Duke of Candale, duchy-peerage created in 1621, Quarterly I quarterly Castile and Leon, II quarterly Navarre and Aragon-Sicily, III quarterly France and gules (Albret), IV per pale Evreux and per pale argent a walnut tree vert, gules a cross cleché, voided and pommety or, and a chief gules, charged with a cross potent argent (de Nogaret). Inescutcheon quarterly Foix and Bearn.	Henry de Nogaret de La Valette
	The Duke of Chaulnes, duchy-peerage created in 1621, Quarterly: I and IV, or, a lion gules, armed, langued and crowned azure (d'Albert); II and III, gules two olive branches argent, set like a crown, crossing in chief and in base, a chief chequy argent and azure (d'Ailly).	Honoré d'Albert
	The Duke of Orleans, duchy-peerage created in 1626, Azure, three fleurs-de-lys or, a label argent. The holder of the title was also: Duke of Chartres, duchy-peerage created in 1626,	Gaston, Duke of Orleans
	The Duke of Chevreuse, duchy-peerage created in 1612, registered 1627, Quarterly: in I and in IV per fess and per three pallets, 1 barry gules and argent, 2 azure seme-de-lys or and a label gules, 3 argent a cross potent or, between four crosslets of the same, 4 or four pallets gules 5 per pale azure seme-de-lys or and a bordure gules, 6 azure a lion contourny or, armed, langued and crowned gules, 7 or a lion sable armed and langued gules, 8 azure crusilly or and two bars or. Inescutcheon or a bend gules charged with three alerions argent overall a label gules; in II and in III quarterly 1 and 4, per pale gules, an escarbuncle or, inescutcheon argent and or a fess chequy gules and argent of three tiers and 2 and 3 azure three fleurs of lys or a bordure compony argent and gules.	Claude de Lorraine, Duke of Chevreuse
	The Duke of Valois, duchy-peerage created in 1630, Azure, three fleurs-de-lys or, a label argent.	Gaston, Duke of Orleans
	The Duke of Richelieu, duchy-peerage created in 1631, Argent, three chevrons gules.	Cardinal Richelieu
	The Duke of La Valette, duchy-peerage created in 1631, Per fess and per three pallets, I quarterly Castile and Leon; II Aragon; III Navarre; IV per saltire Aragon and Hohenstaufen-Sicily; V, barry of six sable and or, a crancelin vert (Saxony); VI or; VII quarterly 1 and 4, azure a fess or between three lion heads caboshed guardant and 2 and 3, argent on a bend gules cottised sable three vols argent; VIII quarterly Foix and Bearn. Inescutcheon, per pale, argent a walnut tree vert; b. gules a cross cleché, voided and pommety or, and a chief gules, charged with a cross potent argent (de Nogaret).	Bernard de Nogaret de La Valette d'Épernon
	The Duke of La Rochefoucauld, duchy-peerage created in 1622, registered 1631, Barry argent and azure three chevrons gules brochant, the first écimé.	François V de La Rochefoucauld (1588-1650)
	The Duke of Montmorency, renamed Duke of Enghien in 1689, duchy-peerage created in 1633, Azure, three fleurs-de-lys or, a bendlet couped gules.	Henri II, Prince of Condé
	The Duke of Retz, duchy-peerage created in 1634, Quarterly: 1 and 4 or two maces sable in saltire and tied gules; 2 and 3, grand-quarterly in I and IV azure three fleurs of lys or, a label and a bendlet couped brochant argent (d'Orléans-Longueville), in II and III quarterly azure three fleurs of lys or between a bendlet couped (de Bourbon).	Henri de Gondi
	The Duke of Fronsac, duchy-peerage created in 1634, Argent three chevrons gules.	Cardinal Richelieu
	The Duke of Aiguillon also called Duke of Puylaurens, duchy-peerage created in 1634, Or, a cross gules, a chief Azure, embattled in base of five pieces arrondies.	Antoine de l'Age, duc de Puylaurens
	The Duke of Saint-Simon, duchy-peerage created in 1635, Quarterly: in 1 and 4, sable, a cross argent, ch. of five escallops gules (Rouvroy); in 2 and 3, chequy or and Azure, a chief Azure, ch. three fleurs-de-lis or (Vermandois). Also (Vermandois) in 1 and 4 and (Rouvroy) in 2 and 3. or Quarterly, in 1 and 4, per pale, a, chequy or and Azure, a chief Azure, charged with three fleurs-de-lis or (de Vermandois), b, sable, a cross argent charged with five escallops gules (de Rouvroy); in 2 and 3 or a fess gules (Havesquerke-Rasse); Overall lozengy argent and gules, a chief argent (la Vacquerie).	Claude de Rouvroy, duc de Saint-Simon
	The Duke of La Force, duchy-peerage created in 1637, Azure, three lions passant guardant or, armed, langued and crowned gules, one over the other. Devise: FERME, LA FORCE.	Jacques-Nompar de Caumont, duc de La Force
	The Duke of Aiguillon, duchy-peerage created in 1638, Argent, three chevrons gules.	Marie-Madeleine de Vignerot du Plessis
	The Duke of Albret, duchy-peerage created in 1641, Azure, three fleurs-de-lys or, a bendlet couped gules.	Henri II, Prince of Condé
	The Duke of Valentinois, duchy-peerage created in 1642, Fusilly argent and gules.	Honoré II Grimaldi (1597-1662), Prince of Monaco,
	The Duke of Rohan also called Duke of Rohan-Chabot, duchy-peerage created in 1603, revived in 1648 for the Chabot branch of the Rohan family, Quarterly, in 1 and 4 gules nine mascles or, set 3, 3, 3; in 2 and 3 or three chalbots gules.	Henri de Chabot
	The Duke of Bourbon, duchy-peerage created in 1661, Azure, three fleurs-de-lys or, a bendlet couped gules.	Louis, Grand Conde
	The Duke of Orleans, duchy-peerage created in 1661, Azure, three fleurs-de-lys or, a label argent. The holder of the title was also: Duke of Chartres, duchy-peerage created in 1661, Duke of Valois, duchy-peerage created in 1661	Philippe I, Duke of Orleans
	The Duke of Verneuil, duchy-peerage created in 1652, registered 1663, Azure three fleurs de lys or and a bendlet couped gules.	Henri, Duke of Verneuil
	The Duke of Estrées, duchy-peerage created in 1663, Azure three fleurs de lys or and a bendlet couped gules.	François Annibal d'Estrées
	The Duke of Gramont, duchy-peerage created in 1648, registered 1663, Quarterly: I and IV, gules three bars wavy or; II and III, gules three bars gemel argent: overall Quarterly, 1, or a lion Azure, armed and langued gules;, gules three arrows argent positioned in pale, darts basewise; 3, or a greyhound rampant gules, harnessed sable, a bordure sable platy; 4, argent a chief indented Azure.	Antoine II de Gramont
	The Duke of La Meilleraye, duchy-peerage created in 1663, Gules, a crescent ermine.	Charles de La Porte
	The Duke of Rethel-Mazarin, duchy-peerage created in 1663, Azure, a fasces or, bound argent, the axe of the same, a fess gules, brochant overall and ch. three mullets or.	Hortense Mancini
	The Duke of Villeroy, duchy-peerage created in 1651, registered 1663, Azure, a chevron between three crosslets moline, two in chef, one in base, all or.	Nicolas de Neufville de Villeroy
	The Duke of Mortemart also called Duke of Tonnay-Charente, duchy-peerage created in 1650, registered 1663, Per fess and per three pallets, eight quarters: in 1 gules a crescent vair (de Maure) in 2 azure three fleurs-de-lis or a bendlet couped gules (Bourbon) in 3 gules nine mascles or (Rohan) in 4 barry argent and azure of six pieces three chevrons gules brochants overall the first écimé (La Rochefoucault) in 5 argent a biscione azure crowned or devouring a child gules (Milan) in 6 gules chains of Navarre or (Navarre) in 7 gules a pallet vair (d'Escars) in 8 ermine plain (Bretagne). Overall barry wavy of six pieces argent and gules (Rochechouart).	Gabriel de Rochechouart de Mortemart
	The Duke of Poix-Créquy, duchy-peerage created in 1652, registered 1663, Or, a crequier gules.	Charles III de Créquy
	The Duke of Saint-Aignan, duchy-peerage created in 1663, Barry argent and vert six martlets gules set 3, 2, 1 on argent. Supports: two swans. Devise: IN TUTO DEL CORE.	François Honorat de Beauvilliers
	The Duke of Randan, duchy-peerage created in 1661, also called Duke of Foix Barry argent and azure (of sixpieces), three chevrons gules brochant overall, that of the chief écimé. Quarterly in 1 and 4: or, three pallets gules and in 2 and 3: or, two cows gules, horned, collared and belled Azure, passant in pale.	Marie-Catherine de La Rochefoucauld († 1677); Henri François de Foix-Candale (1639-1714)
	The Duke of La Roche-Guyon, duchy-peerage created in 1663, Quarterly in 1 and 4, argent a cross engrailed gules charged with five escallops or (Liancourt); in 2 and 3, argent a fess bendy or and gules (Pons).	Roger du Plessis, Duke of Liancourt
	The Duke of Tresmes, later renamed as Duke of Gesvres (1670), duchy-peerage created in 1648, registered 1663, Quarterly in 1 azure a bend argent, between two dragons (Baillet); in 2 or, a chief gules charged in quarter with an escutcheon of Montmorency, of which the first quartier is charged with a mullet sable (Aunoy); in 3 de Montmorency: in 4 argent a chief gules and a lion azure armed, langued and crowned or (Vendôme ancient) and Overall de Potier which is azure three hands dexter or in franc-quartier chequy or and Azure.	René Potier
	The Duke of Noailles, duchy-peerage created in 1663, Gules, a bend or.	Anne de Noailles
	The Duke of Coislin, duchy-peerage created in 1663, Gules, three bars chequy argent and azure of two tiers.	Armand de Camboust, Duke of Coislin
	The Duke of Montausier, duchy-peerage created in 1665, Argent, a fess gules.	Charles de Sainte-Maure, Duke of Montausier
	The Duke of Aumont, duchy-peerage created in 1665, Quarterly: 1, argent a chevron gules between 7 martlets sable, 4 in chief and 3 in base (d'Aumont); 2, gules, a cross fleurdelisée or, between twelve billets of the same (de Villequier); 3, quarterly: a and d, or three chalbots gules (de Chabot); b, argent, a lion gules, forked tail in saltire, armed, langued and crowned or (de Luxembourg); c, gules a mullet of sixteen rays argent (des Baux); 4, barry undy argent and gules of 6 pieces (de Rochechouart); overall gules, a chief chequy azure and argent of two tiers (de Rochebaron).	Antoine d'Aumont de Rochebaron (1601-1669)
	The Duke of La Ferté-Senneterre, duchy-peerage created in 1665, Azure, five fusils conjoined argent, fesswise.	Henri de Saint-Nectaire
	The Duke of Choiseul, duchy-peerage created in 1665, Quarterly, in I gules a lion or armed and langued Azure, in II barry or and sable of six pieces, in III argent a fess gules, in IV or a lion sable, on an escutcheon azure a cross or between eighteen billets of the same, five and five in chief positioned in saltire, four and four in base positioned two and two brochant overall.	César I de Choiseul
	The Duke of Albret, duchy-peerage created in 1651, registered 1665, Quarterly 1 and 4 azure seme-de-lys or, a tower argent, 2 or three torteaux, 3 or four bends gules. Inescutcheon per pale or a gonfanon gules fringed vert and gules a fess argent. The holder of the title was also: Duke of Chateau-Thiery, duchy-peerage created in 1651, registered 1665,	Godefroy-Maurice de La Tour d'Auvergne
	The Duke of La Vallière, duchy-peerage created in 1667, Per fess gules and or, in lion rampant guardant argent on gueules and sable on or.	Louise de La Vallière
	The Duke of Nemours, duchy-peerage created in 1672, Azure three fleurs of lis or a label argent (d'Orléans)	Philippe I, Duke of Orléans
	The Duke of Béthune-Chârost, duchy-peerage created in 1672, registered 1690, Argent, a fess gules surmounted by a label of the same.	Louis de Béthune-Chârost (1605-1681)
	The Duke of Saint-Cloud, duchy-peerage created in 1674, received in Parliament 1690, for the Archbishop of Paris and his successors to that office, Quarterly: in I, per pale, a or, a fess chequy argent and gules of three tiers (de La Marck), b, Azure, an escutcheon argent bordered or, between eight crosslets or in orle, 3, 2 and 3 (de Brézé); in II, per pale, a, argent three fess gules, b, Azure, three fleurs-de-lis or, a bendlet couped gules (de Bourbon); III, per pale, a, azure crusilly crosslets in foot fitchy or, a lion argent brochant (de Commercy), b, paly or and gules; IV, per pale, a, quarterly fusilly bendwise argent and Azure, and sable, a lion or (du Palatinat), b, azure seven plates, a chief or (de Poitiers-Valentinois); overall, argent, two pallets sable (de Harlay).	François III de Harlay and the Archbishops of Paris
	The Duke of Damville, duchy-peerage created in 1694, Azure, three fleurs-de-lys or, a bendlet sinister couped gules.	Louis Alexandre, Count of Toulouse
	The Duke of Montpensier, duchy-peerage created in 1695, Azure, three fleurs-de-lys or, a label argent.	Philippe I, Duke of Orleans
	The Duke of Aumale, duchy-peerage created in 1695,	Louis-Auguste de Bourbon, Duke of Maine
	The Duke of Penthièvre, duchy-peerage created in 1697, extinct in 1793 Azure, three fleurs de lys or and a bendlet couped gules.	Louis de Bourbon, Count of Toulouse

=== Peerages created in the 18th century ===
Figure	Peer and blazon	Grantee
	The Duke of Châteauvillain, duchy-peerage created in 1703, extinct in 1793 Also Duke of Penthièvre	Louis de Bourbon, Count of Toulouse
	The Duke of Guise, duchy-peerage created in 1704, extinct de jure in 1830 Also Duke of Enghien	Anne Henriette of Bavaria and Henri Jules de Bourbon-Condé
	The Duke of Boufflers, duchy created in 1695, peerage created in 1708, both extinct in 1751 Argent three mullets pierced gules, between nine cross crosslets of the same, three in chef, three in fess and three in base set 2 and 1.	Louis François de Boufflers
	The Duke of Villars, duchy-peerage created in 1709, extinct in 1777 Azure, three mullets pierced or, a chief argent, charged with a lion passant gules.	Claude Louis Hector de Villars
	The Duke of Harcourt, duchy-peerage created in 1709, Gules two bars or.	Henry d'Harcourt
	The Duke of Fitz-James, duchy-peerage created in 1710, extinct de jure in 1967 Quarterly: in I and IV quarterly azure three fleurs de lys or (de France) and gules three lions passant guardant or (England); in II or, a lion gules, in double tressure flory and counter-flory of the same (Scotland); in III Azure, a harp or, stringed argent (Ireland); a bordure compony of twelve pieces azure a fleur-de-lys or and gules a lion passant or.	James FitzJames, 1st Duke of Berwick
	The Duke of Alençon, duchy-peerage created in 1710 and extinct in 1714 Azure three fleurs of lys or, a bordure engrailed gules. The holder of the title was also: Duke of Angoulême, duchy-peerage created in 1710,	Charles, Duke of Berry
	The Duke of Antin, duchy-peerage created in 1711, extinct in 1757 Per fess: I, per four pallets, 1, argent, a lion gules, within an orle of seven escutcheons gules a fess or; 2, azure a lion or armed and langued gules; 3, azure a bell argent, clapper sable; 4, azure three flames argent issuant from base; 5, argent, three bars wavy azure (Pardaillan); II, per three pallets, 1, gules a jug or; 2, or three pallets gules; 3, or a key sable palewise, on its dexter three tourteaux; 4, barry undy argent and gules (de Rochechouart); overall, or a castle gules, masoned sable, triple-towered, surmounted by three Moor heads sable headbands argent (de la vicomté de Castillon).	Louis Antoine de Pardaillan de Gondrin
	The Duke of Rambouillet, duchy-peerage created in 1711, extinct in 1793 Also Duke of Penthièvre	Louis de Bourbon, Count of Toulouse
	The Duke of Chaulnes, duchy-peerage created in 1711 Gules two olive branches argent, set like a crown, crossing in chief and in base, a chief chequy argent and azure (d'Ailly), an escutcheon or, a lion gules, armed, langued and crowned azure (d'Albert).	Louis Auguste d'Albert d'Ailly
	The Duke of Rohan-Rohan, duchy-peerage created in 1714, extinct in 1787 Gules nine mascles or, set 3, 3, 3.	Hercule Mériadec de Rohan-Soubise
	The Duke of Joyeuse, duchy-peerage created in 1714, extinct in 1724 Azure seven bezants set 3, 3, 1, and a chief or.	Louis, Duke of Joyeuse (1694–1724)
	The Duke of Hostun (sometimes called Duke of Tallard), duchy-peerage created in 1715, extinct in 1755 Gules, a cross engrailed or.	Camille d'Hostun, duc de Tallard
	The Duke of Valentinois, created in 1716, extinct in 1949 From 1731, the holder of this title is also Prince of Monaco.	Jacques I, Prince of Monaco
	The Duke of Roannais also called Duke of La Feuillade, duchy-peerage created in 1667, registered 1716, Or, a cross moline gules.	Louis d'Aubusson de La Feuillade
	The Duke of Villars-Brancas, duchy-peerage created in 1652, registered 1657 in Parliament of Aix, received in Parliament 1716 Azure, a pale argent, charged with three towers gules, and flanked by four claws of lion issuant from the flanks of the shield positioned in chevron.	Louis-Antoine de Brancas
	The Duke of Nevers, duchy-peerage created in 1720, Quarterly azure a fasces or tied and axe argent, on a fess gules three mullets or, and azure two fishes in pale addorsed argent.	Philippe Jules Mancini
	The Duke of Biron, duchy-peerage created in 1723, extinct in 1793 Quarterly or and gules, the shield in a banner.	Charles-Armand de Gontaut, duc de Biron
	The Duke of Lévis, duchy-peerage created in 1723, extinct in 1734 Or three chevrons sable.	Charles Eugène de Lévis
	The Duke of La Vallière, duchy-peerage created in 1723 and extinct in 1780 Per fess gules and or a lion a lion rampant guardant per fess argent and sable	Charles François de La Vallière
	The Duke of Mercoeur, duchy-peerage created in 1723, extinct in 1770 Since 1727, the holder of this title is the Prince of Conti	Louis François de Bourbon-Conti
	The Duke of Fleury, duchy-peerage created in 1736, extinct de jure in 1815 Quarterly: in 1, argent, a bouquet of three roses gules, stalked and leaved vert, 1 and 2 (Rosset); in 2, gules, a lion or (Lasset); in 3, quarterly argent and sable (Vissec de Latude); in 4, Azure, three rooks or (Rocozel). Overall azure three roses or (Fleury).	Jean Hercule de Rosset de Rocozel (1683-1748)
	The Duke of Châtillon, duchy-peerage created in 1736, extinct in 1762 Gules three pallets of vair, a chief or	Alexis de Châtillon
	The Duke of Gisors, duchy of 1742, peerage created in 1748, then, in 1759 Duke of Belle-Isle, extinct in 1761, Quarterly: in 1 and 4, argent, a squirrel rampant gules (Fouquet); in 2 and 3, or, three chevrons sable (Lévis).	Charles Louis Auguste Fouquet de Belle-Isle
	The Duke of Duras, duchy of 1689, peerage created in 1756, Quarterly: in 1 and 4, argent, a bend azure (de Durfort); in 2 and 3, gules, a lion argent (Lomagne).	Jean-Baptiste de Durfort
	The Duke of La Vauguyon, duchy-peerage created in 1758, extinct de jure in 1837 Quarterly: in 1, per pale: a. argent a saltire gules (Stuer); b. or four cotices gules (Caussade); in 2 and 3, Azure, three fleurs-de-lis or, and on a bend couped gules, three lions argent (Bourbon-Carency); in 4, gules, a pallet vair and a bordure engrailed argent (Pérusse des Cars-Carency). Overall argent three leaves of holly vert (Quélen)..	Antoine de Quélen de Stuer de Caussade
	The Duke of Stainville also called Duke of Choiseul, duchy-peerage created in 1758, extinct in 1785 Azure a cross or, between of eighteen billets of the same, five each at the chief, set 2, 1 and 2, and four each canton of the base, set 2 and 2 (de Choiseul). or Azure, a cross or, between twenty billets of the same, five at each canton, 2, 1 and 2 (de Choiseul), Overall an escutcheon or, a cross moline gules (Stainville). Supports: two lions. or Quarterly: in 1 and 4, Azure, a cross or, between twenty billets of the same, five at each canton, 2, 1 and 2 (de Choiseul); in 2 and 3, or, a cross moline gules (de Stainville). Supports: two lions.	Étienne François de Choiseul
	The Duke of Praslin, duchy-peerage created in 1762, Quarterly, in I and IV azure a cross or, between eighteen billets of the same, five at each canton of the chief, set 2, 1 and 2, and four at each canton of the base, set 2 and 2 (de Choiseul); in II and III, gules a lion crowned or.	César Gabriel de Choiseul-Praslin
	The Duke of Choiseul d'Amboise, duchy-peerage created in 1764, extinct in 1785 Also Duke of Stainville, or of Choiseul	Étienne François de Choiseul
	The Duke of Anjou, duchy-peerage created in 1771, Azure three fleurs de lys or a bordure engrailed gules.	Louis Stanislas Xavier, Count of Provence, later Louis XVIII of France
	The Duke of Angoulême, duchy-peerage created in 1773 Azure three fleurs de lys or a bordure embattled gules. The holder of the title was also: Duke of Auvergne, duchy-peerage created in 1773; Duke of Mercoeur, duchy-peerage created in 1773	Charles, Count of Artois, later Charles X of France
	The Duke of Alençon, duchy-peerage created in 1774 Also Duke of Anjou	Louis Stanislas Xavier, Count of Provence, later Louis XVIII of France
	The Duke of Clermont-Tonnerre, duchy of 1755, peerage created in 1775, Gules, two keys argent in saltire.	Gaspard de Clermont-Tonnerre
	The Duke of Berry, duchy-peerage created in 1776 The holder of the title was also: Duke of Châteauroux, duchy-peerage created in 1776,	Charles, Count of Artois, later Charles X of France
	The Duke of Aumale, duchy-peerage created in 1776, extinct in 1793 The holder of the title was also: Duke of Gisors, duchy-peerage created in 1776, received in Parliament 1777,	Louis de Bourbon, Duke of Penthièvre
	The Duke of Aubigny, duchy-peerage created in 1684, registered 1777, Barry argent and Azure.	Louise de Kérouaille, Duchess of Portsmouth
	The Duke of Louvois, duchy-peerage created in 1777, extinct de jure in 1800 Azure, three fleurs de lys or.	Princess Marie Adélaïde of France; Princess Sophie of France
	The Duke of Brunoy, duchy-peerage created in 1777, extinct in 1786 Also Duke of Anjou	Louis Stanislas Xavier, Count of Provence, later Louis XVIII of France
	The Duke of Amboise, duchy-peerage created in 1787, extinct in 1793 Also Duke of Penthièvre	Louis de Bourbon, Duke of Penthièvre
	The Duke of Choiseul, duchy-peerage created in 1787, extinct de jure in 1838	Claude de Choiseul-Beaupré
	The Duke of Coigny, duchy of 1747, peerage created in 1787, extinct de jure in 1865 Gules, a fess or, charged with three mullets Azure, between three crescents or.	François-Henri de Franquetot de Coigny

In 1789, there were 43 peers, of whom 6 were princes of the blood.

=== Peerages created in the 19th century ===
From 1814 to 1830 the number of peers increased from 154 to 365.

== See also ==
- Peerage of France
- List of French peerages
- List of French peers
- List of French dukedoms

=== Sources and Bibliography ===
- Duchés-Pairies, Duchés et Pairies français sous l'Ancien Régime sur www.heraldique-europeenne.org
- Maisons ducales ou titulaires de Pairies sous l'Ancien Régime sur www.heraldique-europeenne.org
- Vincent Albouy,
- Neubecker. Héraldique
- Louda. Europe
- GenHeral.com
- (http://memodoc.com)
- Annuaire de la noblesse de France et des maisons souveraines de l'Europe 1843 à 1880
- Recueil d'armoiries des maisons nobles de France by Nicolas Jules Henri Gourdon de Genouillac 1860
- Pierre Paul Dubuisson. Armorial des principales maisons et familles du royaume, de Paris et de l'Île de France
