= List of French peerages =

Heraldic depiction of a duke's coronet, with blue bonnet of a peer

Coronet and mantle of a duke and peer of France, shown here with the collars of the Ordres du roi

For an explanation of the French peerage, see the article Peerage of France. Note that peerages and titles were distinct, and the date given for the extinction of the peerage is not necessarily the same as that of the extinction of the title. For more on noble titles and distinctions, see French nobility.

== The "old peerages" ==
The dates of the creation of the twelve peerages are obscure.

Title	Documentary identification	Notes
Duke of Reims	1216	held by the Archbishop of Reims
Duke of Laon	?	held by the Bishop of Laon
Duke of Langres	1216	held by the Bishop of Langres
Count of Beauvais	1216	held by the Bishop of Beauvais
Count of Châlons	1216	held by the Bishop of Châlons
Count of Noyon	1216	held by the Bishop of Noyon
Duke of Normandy	1202	forfeit 1203
Duke of Aquitaine (Guyenne)	1202	forfeit 1203
Duke of Burgundy	1216	merged 1361
Count of Flanders	1224	ceded to the Holy Roman Empire 1531
Count of Champagne	1216	merged 1314
Count of Toulouse	?	merged 1271

== The "new peerages" (1259–1789) ==
=== House of Capet ===
Title	Date of Creation	Surname	Mode of extinction	Notes
Reign of Saint Louis IX (8 November 1226 - 25 August 1270)
Duke of Guyenne	1259	Plantagenet (House of Anjou)	forfeit 1369	also forfeit 1294–1303 and 1347–1360; legitimate male line extinguished in 1499
Reign of Philip III (25 August 1270 - 5 October 1285)
none
Reign of Philip IV (5 October 1285 - 29 November 1314)
Count of Anjou	1297	Royal family	merged 1328	for Charles, brother of King Philip IV
Count of Artois	1297	Artois (Royal family)	ceded to the Holy Roman Empire 1530	
Reigns of Louis X (29 November 1314 - 5 June 1316) & John I (15–20 November 1316)
Count of Poitou	1314	Royal family	merged 1316	for Philip, brother of King Louis X
Count of La Marche	1316	Royal family	extinct 1321	for Charles, brother of King Philip V
Count of Évreux	1316	Évreux (Royal family)	exchanged 1404	
Reign of Philip V (20 November 1316 - 3 January 1322)
Count of Angoulême	1317	Évreux (Royal family)	exchanged 1404	
Count of La Marche	1321	Bourbon (Royal family)	forfeit 1527	
Reign of Charles IV (3 January 1322 - 1 February 1328)
Count of Étampes	1327	Évreux (Royal family)	given away 1381	
Duke of Bourbon	1327	Bourbon (Royal family)	forfeit 1527	

=== House of Valois ===
Title	Date of Creation	Surname	Mode of extinction	Notes
Reign of Philip VI (1 February 1328 - 22 August 1350)
Count of Beaumont-le-Roger	1328	Artois (Royal family)	forfeit 1331	
Count of Maine	1331	Royal family	merged 1350	for John, son of King Philip VI
Duke of Normandy	1332	Royal family	merged 1350	for John, son of King Philip VI
Duke of Orléans	1344	Royal family	extinct 1376	for Philip, son of King Philip VI
Count of Valois	1344	Royal family	extinct 1376	for Philip, son of King Philip VI
Count of Nevers	1347	Royal family, Flanders	extinct 1383	for Marguerite, daughter of King Philip V
Reign of John II (22 August 1350 - 8 April 1364)
Count of Mantes	1353	Évreux (Royal family)	exchanged 1404	
Count of Beaumont-le-Roger	1354	Évreux (Royal family)	exchanged 1404	
Duke of Normandy	1355	Royal family	merged 1364	for Charles, son of King John II
Duke of Anjou	1356	Royal family	extinct 1481	for Louis, son of King John II
Count of Poitou	1357	Royal family	exchanged 1360	for John, son of King John II
Count of Mâcon	1359	Royal family	exchanged 1360	for John, son of King John II
Count of Maine	1360	Royal family	extinct 1481	for Louis, son of King John II
Duke of Berry	1360	Royal family	extinct 1417	for John, son of King John II
Duke of Auvergne	1360	Royal family	extinct 1521	for John, son of King John II
Duke of Touraine	1360	Royal family	exchanged 1363	for Philip, son of King John II
Duke of Burgundy	1363	Royal family	extinct 1477	for Philip, son of King John II
Reign of Charles V (8 April 1364 - 16 September 1380)
Count of Poitou	1369	Royal family	extinct 1417	for John, son of King John II
Baron of Montpellier	1371	Évreux (Royal family)	forfeit 1382	
Reign of Charles VI (16 September 1380 - 21 October 1422)
Duke of Touraine	1386	Royal family	exchanged 1392	for Louis, brother of King Charles VI
Duke of Orléans	1392	Royal family	merged 1498	for Louis, brother of King Charles VI
Count of Valois	1392	Royal family	elevated to a dukedom 1406	for Louis, brother of King Charles VI
Duke of Guyenne	after 1392	Royal family	extinct 1400	for Charles, son of King Charles VI
Count of Périgord	1399	Valois-Orléans (Royal family)	sold 1397	for Louis, brother of King Charles VI
Duke of Guyenne	after 1400	Royal family	extinct 1415	for Louis, son of King Charles VI
Duke of Touraine	1401	Royal family	extinct 1416	for John, son of King Charles VI
Duke of Alençon	1404	Valois-Alençon (Royal family)	extinct 1525	forfeit 1458–1461, 1474–1476 and 1482–1483
Count of Soissons	1404	Orléans (Royal family)	merged 1498	for Louis, brother of King Charles VI
Baron of Coucy	1404	Valois=Orléans (Royal family)	merged 1498	for Louis, brother of King Charles VI
Duke of Nemours	1404	Évreux (Royal family)	extinct 1503	
Castellan of Châtillon	1404	??	??	
Count of Rethel	1405	Bourgogne (Royal family)	extinct 1415	
Duke of Valois	1406	Royal family	merged 1498	for Louis, brother of King Charles VI
Count of Mortagne	1407	Royal family	extinct 1416	for John, son of King Charles VI
Count of Mortain	1407	Évreux (Royal family)	forfeit 1408	
Castellan of Evry-le-Châtel	1408	??	??	
Castellan of Jouy-le-Châtel	1408	??	??	
Count of Mortain	1414	Royal family	extinct 1415	for Louis, son of King Charles VI
Duke of Berry	1416	Royal family	extinct 1416	for John, son of King Charles VI
Duke of Touraine	1416	Royal family	merged 1422	for Charles, son of King Charles VI
Duke of Berry	1417	Royal family	merged 1422	for Charles, son of King Charles VI
Reign of Charles VII (21 October 1422 - 22 July 1461)
Duke of Touraine	1423	Douglas	extinct 1440	
Count of Évreux	1427	Stewart	exchanged after 1428	
Count of Saintonge	1428	Stewart	For Sale	
Duke of Normandy	1436	Royal family	extinct 1436	for Philip, son of King Charles VII
Duke of Guyenne	1436	Royal family	extinct 1436	for Philip, son of King Charles VII
Count of Foix	1458	Foix, Albret, Bourbon	merged 1589	
Count of Eu	1458	Artois (Royal family), Bourgogne, Cleves, Lorraine-Guise, Orléans, Bourbon	extinct 1775	
Count of Nevers	1459	Bourgogne (Royal family)	extinct 1464	
Reign of Louis XI (22 July 1461 - 30 August 1483)
Duke of Berry	1461	Royal family	exchanged 1465	for Charles, brother of King Louis XI
Count of Nevers	1464	Bourgogne (Royal family)	extinct 1491	
Duke of Normandy	1465	Royal family	exchanged 1469	for Charles, brother of King Louis XI
Count of Mortain	1465	Royal family	extinct 1474	for Charles, brother of King Louis XI
Duke of Guyenne	1469	Royal family	extinct 1474	for Charles, brother of King Louis XI
Count of Villefranche	1480	Aragon	extinct ???	
Reign of Charles VIII (30 August 1483 - 7 April 1498)
none
Reign of Louis XII (7 April 1498 - 1 January 1515)
Duke of Valois	1498	Angoulême (Royal family)	merged 1515	
Count of Nevers	1505	Cleves	elevated to a dukedom 1538	
Countess of Soissons	1505	Royal family	merged 1515	for Claude, daughter of King Louis XII
Baronness of Coucy	1505	Royal family	merged 1515	for Claude, daughter of King Louis XII
Duke of Nemours	1507	Foix	extinct 1512	
Reign of Francis I (1 January 1515 - 31 March 1547)
Duke of Vendôme	1515	Bourbon (Royal family)	merged 1589	
Duchess of Angoulême	1515	Savoy	extinct 1532	for Louise of Savoy, mother of King Francis I
Duchess of Anjou	1515	Savoy	extinct 1532	for Louise of Savoy, mother of King Francis I
Duke of Châtellerault	1515	Bourbon (Royal family)	forfeit 1527	
Duchess of Valois	1516	Orléans (Royal family)	extinct 1520	
Duchess of Berry	1517	Orléans (Royal family)	extinct 1549	
Duke of Nemours	1524	Savoy	extinct 1652	for Louise of Savoy, mother of King Francis I. Transferred to the grantee's brother in 1528
Duchess of Bourbon	1527	Savoy	extinct 1532	for Louise of Savoy, mother of King Francis I
Duchess of Châtellerault	1527	Savoy	given away 1530	
Duke of Guise	1528	Lorraine	extinct 1675	
Duchess of Auvergne	1528	Savoy	extinct 1532	for Louise of Savoy, mother of King Francis I
Duchess of Châtellerault	1530	Savoy	extinct 1532	for Louise of Savoy, mother of King Francis I
Duke of Nevers	1539	Albret, Cleves, Gonzaga	sold 1659	
Duke of Montpensier	1539	Bourbon (Royal family)	extinct 1608	
Duke of Orléans	1540	Royal family	extinct 1545	for Charles, son of King Francis I
Duke of Angoulême	1540	Royal family	extinct 1545	for Charles, son of King Francis I
Duke of Châtellerault	1540	Royal family	extinct 1545	for Charles, son of King Francis I
Count of Clermont	1540	Royal family	extinct 1545	for Charles, son of King Francis I
Count of La Marche	1540	Royal family	extinct 1545	for Charles, son of King Francis I
Duke of Bourbon	1544	Royal family	extinct 1545	for Charles, son of King Francis I
Reign of Henry II (31 March 1547 - 10 July 1559)
Duke of Aumale	1547	Lorraine-Guise	extinct 1631	
Duchess of Berry	1550	Royal family	extinct 1574	for Marguerite, sister of King Henry II
Duke of Montmorency	1551	Montmorency	forfeit 1632	
Duke of Albret	1556	Albret, Bourbon	merged 1589	for Jeanne d'Albret, suo jure queen of Navarre
Reign of Francis II (10 July 1559 - 5 December 1560)
none
Reign of Charles IX (5 December 1560 - 30 May 1574)
Duke of Anjou	1566	Royal family	merged 1574	for Henry, brother of King Charles IX
Duke of Bourbon	1566	Royal family	merged 1574	for Henry, brother of King Charles IX
Count of Forez	1566	Royal family	merged 1574	for Henry, brother of King Charles IX
Duke of Alençon	1566	Royal family	extinct 1584	for Francis, brother of King Charles IX
Duke of Château-Thierry	1566	Royal family	extinct 1584	for Francis, brother of King Charles IX
Count of Perche	1566	Royal family	extinct 1584	for Francis, brother of King Charles IX
Count of Meulan	1566	Royal family	extinct 1584	for Francis, brother of King Charles IX
Count of Mantes	1566	Royal family	extinct 1584	for Francis, brother of King Charles IX
Duke of Penthièvre	1569	Luxembourg, Lorraine, Bourbon-Vendôme	extinct 1687	
Duke of Auvergne	1569	Royal family	merged 1574	for Henry, brother of King Charles IX
Duke of Évreux	1569	Royal family	extinct 1584	for Francis, brother of King Charles IX
Count of Dreux	1569	Royal family	extinct 1584	for Francis, brother of King Charles IX
Duke of Mercœur	1569	Lorraine	extinct 1712	
Duke of Uzès	1572	Crussol	abolished 1790	
Duke of Mayenne	1573	Lorraine-Guise, Gonzaga	sold 1654	
Reign of Henry III (30 May 1574 - 2 August 1589)
Duke of Saint-Fargeau	1574	Bourbon-Montpensier (Royal family)	extinct 1693	
Duke of Anjou	1576	Royal family	extinct 1584	for Francis, brother of King Henry III
Duke of Touraine	1576	Royal family	extinct 1584	for Francis, brother of King Henry III
Duke of Berry	1576	Royal family	extinct 1584	for Francis, brother of King Henry III
Duke of Joyeuse	1581	Joyeuse, Lorraine-Guise	extinct 1675	
Duke of Piney	1581	Luxembourg, Albert, Clermont, Montmorency–Luxembourg	abolished 1790	also known as "Duke of Luxembourg" (not to be confused with the Sovereign title of Duke of Luxembourg)
Duke of Elbeuf	1581	Lorraine	abolished 1790	
Duke of Retz	1581	Gondi	extinct 1634	
Duke of Epernon	1581	La Valette	extinct 1661	
Duke of Rethel	1581	Gonzaga	sold 1658	
Duke of Hallwin	1588	Hallwin	extinct 1611(?)	
Duke of Montbazon	1588	Rohan	extinct 1593	
Duke of Ventadour	1589	Lévis	extinct 1717	

=== House of Bourbon ===
Title	Date of Creation	Surname	Mode of extinction	Notes
Reign of Henry IV (2 August 1589 - 14 May 1610)
Duke of Montbazon	1595	Rohan	abolished 1790	
Duke of Thouars	1599	La Trémoille	abolished 1790	
Duke of Beaufort	1597	Estrées, Bourbon	sold 1688	for the mistress of King Henry IV
Duke of Vendôme	1598	Bourbon	extinct 1712	for Cesar, illegitimate son of King Henry IV
Duke of Biron	1598	Gontaut	forfeit 1602	
Duke of Aiguillon	1600	Lorraine-Mayenne	extinct 1621	
Duke of Rohan	1603	Rohan	extinct 1638	for Henri, Duke of Rohan
Duke of Sully	1606	Béthune	abolished 1790	
Duke of Fronsac	1608	Orléans-Longueville	extinct 1631	
Duchess of Montpensier	1608	Bourbon (Royal family), Orléans	extinct 1693	
Duke of Damville	1610	Montmorency	forfeit 1632	
Reign of Louis XIII (14 May 1610 - 14 May 1643)
Duke of Hallwin	1611	Hallwin	extinct 1620	
Duke of Châteauroux	1616	Bourbon-Condé (Royal family)	left the possession of this family by 1710	
Duke of Luynes	1619	Albert	abolished 1790	
Duke of Lesdiguières	1620	Bonne, Créquy	extinct 1711	
Duke of Bellegarde	1620	Saint-Lary	extinct 1646	
Duke of Brissac	1620	Cossé	abolished 1790	
Duke of Hallwin	1621	Hallwin, Schomberg	extinct 1656	
Duke of Candale	1621	La Valette	extinct 1639	peerage created for life with no territorial attachment
Duke of Chaulnes	1621	Albert	extinct 1698	
Duke of Orléans	1626	Royal family	extinct 1660	for Gaston, brother of King Louis XIII
Duke of Chartres	1626	Royal family	extinct 1660	for Gaston, brother of King Louis XIII
Duke of Chevreuse	1627	Lorraine-Guise	sold 1655	
Duke of Valois	1630	Royal family	extinct 1660	for Gaston, brother of King Louis XIII
Duke of Richelieu	1631	Plessis, Vignerot	abolished 1790	
Duke of La Valette	1631	La Valette	extinct 1661	
Duke of La Rochefoucauld	1631	La Rochefoucauld	abolished 1790	
Duke of Montmorency	1633	Bourbon-Condé (Royal family)	abolished 1790	renamed Duke of Enghien in 1689
Duke of Retz	1634	Gondi	extinct 1676	
Duke of Fronsac	1634	Plessis, Maillé-Brézé, Bourbon-Condé, Vignerot	abolished 1790	
Duke of Aiguillon	1634	L'Age	extinct 1635	
Duke of Saint-Simon	1635	Rouvroy	extinct 1755	
Duke of La Force	1637	Caumont	extinct 1755	
Duke of Aiguillon	1638	Vignerot, Plessis	abolished 1790	
Duke of Albret	1641	Bourbon-Condé (Royal family)	given away 1651	
Duke of Valentinois	1642	Grimaldi	extinct 1731	
Reign of Louis XIV (14 May 1643 - 1 September 1715)
Duke of Rohan	1648	Rohan–Chabot	abolished 1790	for Anne de Rohan-Chabot and her husband François, Prince of Soubise
Duke of Albret	1665	La Tour d'Auvergne	abolished 1790	
Duke of Château-Thierry	1665	La Tour d'Auvergne	abolished 1790	
Duke of Bourbon	1661	Bourbon-Condé (Royal family)	abolished 1790	
Duke of Orléans	1661	Royal family	abolished 1790	for Philip, brother of King Louis XIV
Duke of Chartres	1661	Royal family	abolished 1790	for Philip, brother of King Louis XIV
Duke of Valois	1661	Royal family	abolished 1790	for Philip, brother of King Louis XIV
Duke of Randan	1661	La Rochefoucauld-Randan, Foix de Candale	extinct 1714	
Duke of Verneuil	1663	Bourbon	extinct 1682	for Henry, illegitimate son of King Henry IV
Duke of Estrées	1663	Estrées de Lauzières	extinct 1737	
Duke of Gramont	1663	Gramont	abolished 1790	
Duke of La Meilleraye	1663	La Porte-Mazarin	extinct 1738	
Duke of Rethel	1663	La Porte-Mazarin	extinct 1738	
Duke of Villeroy	1663	Neufville	abolished 1790	
Duke of Mortemart	1663	Rochechouart	abolished 1790	
Duke of Poix	1663	Créquy	extinct 1687	
Duke of Saint-Aignan	1663	Beauvilliers	abolished 1790	
Duke of La Rocheguyon	1663	Plessis-Liancourt	extinct 1674	
Duke of Tresmes	1663	Potier	abolished 1790	
Duke of Noailles	1663	Noailles	abolished 1790	
Duke of Coislin	1663	Cambout	extinct 1732	
Duc de Choiseul	1665	Choiseul	extinct 1705	
Duke of Aumont	1665	Aumont	abolished 1790	
Duke of La Ferté-Senneterre	1666	Saint-Nectaire	extinct 1703	
Duke of Montausier	1665	Saint-Maure	extinct 1690	
Duchesse de La Vallière	1667	La Vallière, Bourbon	given away 1698	for the mistress of King Louis XIV
Duke of Nemours	1672	Royal family	abolished 1790	for Philip, brother of King Louis XIV
Duke of Saint-Cloud	1674	n/a	abolished 1790	held by the Archbishop of Paris
Duke of Béthune-Charost	1690	Béthune	abolished 1790	
Duke of Damville	1694	Bourbon	sold 1719	for Louis-Alexandre, legitimated son of King Louis XIV
Duke of Montpensier	1695	Royal family	abolished 1790	for Philip, brother of King Louis XIV
Duke of Aumale	1695	Bourbon	sold 1773	for Louis-Auguste, legitimated son of King Louis XIV
Duke of Penthièvre	1697	Bourbon	abolished 1790	for Louis-Alexandre, legitimated son of King Louis XIV
Duke of Châteauvillain	1703	Bourbon	abolished 1790	for Louis-Alexandre, legitimated son of King Louis XIV
Duke of Guise	1704	Bourbon-Condé (Royal family)	abolished 1790	
Duke of Boufflers	1708	Boufflers	extinct 1751	
Duke of Villars	1709	Brancas	extinct 1777	
Duke of Harcourt	1709	Harcourt	abolished 1790	
Duke of Alençon	1710	Royal family	extinct 1714	for Charles, grandson of King Louis XIV
Duke of Angoulême	1710	Royal family	extinct 1714	for Charles, grandson of King Louis XIV
Duke of Fitz-James	1710	Fitz-James	abolished 1790	
Duke of Antin	1711	Pardaillan de Gondrin	extinct 1757	
Duke of Rambouillet	1711	Bourbon	abolished 1790	for Louis-Alexandre, legitimated son of King Louis XIV
Duke of Chaulnes	1711	Albert d'Ailly, Albert de Luynes	abolished 1790	
Duke of Rohan-Rohan	1714	Rohan	extinct 1787	for Hercule Meriadec de Rohan
Duke of Joyeuse	1714	Melun	extinct 1724	
Duke of Hostun	1715	Hostun	extinct 1755	
Reign of Louis XV (1 September 1715 - 10 May 1774)
Duke of Villars-Brancas	1716	Brancas	abolished 1790	
Duke of Roannais	1716	Aubusson de La Feuillade	extinct 1725	
Duke of Valentinois	1716	Goyon de Matignon, Grimaldi	abolished 1790	
Duke of Nevers	1720	Mazarini-Mancini	abolished 1790	
Duke of Biron	1723	Gontaut de Biron	abolished 1790	
Duke of Lévis	1723	Lévis	extinct 1734	
Duke of La Vallière	1723	La Baume Le Blanc	extinct 1780	
Duke of Mercœur	1723	Bourbon-Conti (Royal family)	sold 1770	
Duke of Châtillon	1736	Châtillon	extinct 1762	
Duke of Fleury	1736	Rosset	abolished 1790	
Duke of Gisors	1748	Fouquet	extinct 1761	
Duke of Duras	1756	Durfort	abolished 1790	
Duke of Stainville	1758	Choiseul	extinct 1785	
Duke of La Vauguyon	1758	Quélen de Stuer de Caussade	abolished 1790	
Duke of Praslin	1762	Choiseul	abolished 1790	
Duke of Choiseul d'Amboise	1764	Choiseul	extinct 1785	
Duke of Anjou	1771	Royal family	abolished 1790	for Louis, brother of King Louis XVI
Duke of Angoulême	1773	Royal family	abolished 1790	for Charles, brother of King Louis XVI
Duke of Auvergne	1773	Royal family	exchanged 1778	for Charles, brother of King Louis XVI
Duke of Mercœur	1773	Royal family	exchanged 1778	for Charles, brother of King Louis XVI
Duke of Alençon	1774	Royal family	abolished 1790	for Louis, brother of King Louis XVI
Reign of Louis XVI (10 May 1774 - 21 September 1792 + exec. 21 January 1793)
Duke of Clermont-Tonnerre	1775	Clermont-Tonnerre	abolished 1790	
Duke of Berry	1776	Royal family	abolished 1790	for Charles, brother of King Louis XVI
Duke of Châteauroux	1776	Royal family	abolished 1790	for Charles, brother of King Louis XVI
Duke of Aumale	1776	Bourbon	abolished 1790	
Duke of Gisors	1776	Bourbon	abolished 1790	
Duke of Brunoy	1777	Royal family	given away 1786	for Louis, brother of King Louis XVI
Duchesse de Louvois	1777	Royal family	abolished 1790	for Marie-Adélaïde and Sophie, daughters of King Louis XV (held jointly)
Duke of Aubigny	1777	Stuart, Lennox, Gordon	abolished 1790	
Duke of Amboise	1787	Bourbon	abolished 1790	
Duke of Choiseul	1787	Choiseul-Beaupré	abolished 1790	
Duché de Coigny	1787	Franquetot	abolished 1790	the last peerage created before the Revolution
