= French nobility =

Social class in Middle Ages and early modern France

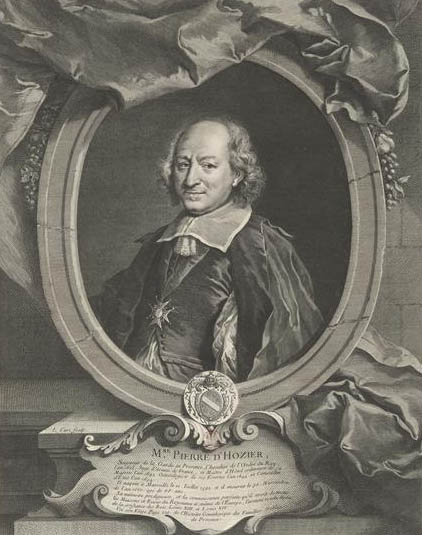
Pierre d'Hozier (1592–1660), genealogist and juge d'armes of France, employed to verify the French nobility

The French nobility (French: la noblesse française) is an aristocratic social class in France dating from the Middle Ages.

From 1808 to 1815 during the First Empire the Emperor Napoléon bestowed titles that were recognized as a new nobility by the Charter of 4 June 1814 granted by King Louis XVIII.

From 1814 to 1848 (Bourbon Restoration in France and July Monarchy) and from 1852 to 1870 (Second French Empire) the French nobility was restored as a hereditary distinction without any privileges and new hereditary titles were granted. Since the beginning of the French Third Republic on 4 September 1870 the French nobility has no legal existence and status. However, the ancient authentic titles transmitted regularly can be recognized in the Grand Livre du Sceau (equivalent to the British Roll of the Peerage) as part of the name after a request to the Department of Justice.

Families of the French nobility could have two origins as to their principle of nobility: the families of immemorial nobility and the ennobled families.

Sources differ about the actual number of French families of noble origin, but agree that it was proportionally among the smallest noble classes in Europe. For the year 1789, French historian François Bluche gives a figure of 140,000 nobles (9,000 noble families) and states that about 5% of nobles could claim descent from feudal nobility before the 15th century. With a total population of 28 million, this would represent merely 0.5%. Historian Gordon Wright gives a figure of 300,000 nobles (of which 80,000 were from the traditional noblesse d'épée, lit. 'nobility of the sword'), which agrees with the estimation of historian Jean de Viguerie, or a little over 1%. At the time of the Revolution, noble estates comprised about one-fifth of the land.

In 2016, it was estimated that roughly 4,000 families could claim to be French nobility, totaling around 50,000–100,000 individuals, or roughly the same number as they were in the 1780s.

== Origins of French nobility ==
Among the French nobility, two classes were distinguished:

- The immemorial nobility for the families recognized for having always lived nobly.
- The ennobled families (ennobled by an office or by Letters patent from the King).

In the 18th century, the comte de Boulainvilliers, a rural noble, posited the belief that French nobility had descended from the victorious Franks, while non-nobles descended from the conquered Gallo-Romans and subdued Germanic tribes that had also attempted to seize Gaul before the Franks, such as the Alemanni and Visigoths. The theory had no proven basis, but offered a comforting myth for an increasingly impoverished noble class.

The French historian Guy Chaussinand-Nogaret, specialist of the French nobility in the 18th century, writes that some historians mistakenly confused the knightly nobility (noblesse chevaleresque) with the sword nobility (noblesse d'épée) that they opposed the robe nobility. He reminds that sword nobility and robe nobility are states, professions and not social classes within the French nobility and that they often merge within the same family. He writes that the notion of sword nobility means nothing and he reminds us that the King of France did not establish a military nobility until 1750.

=== Immemorial nobility ===
The immemorial nobility (also called noblesse de race or noblesse d'extraction) includes the families recognized for having always lived nobly and never ennobled.

Genealogists sometimes make the following distinctions:

- Noblesse d'épée (nobility of the sword): Known as France's oldest aristocracy, but its existence has, in recent years, been questioned by some scholars.
- Noblesse féodale (feudal nobility): nobility proved since the 11th century.
- Noblesse chevaleresque (knightly nobility): nobility proved since the 14th century with the qualification of "knight" at this time.
- Noblesse d'ancienne extraction (nobility of old extraction): nobility proved since the 15th century.
- Noblesse d'extraction (nobility of extraction): nobility proved since the 16th century.

=== Ennobled families ===
The ennobled families includes the families ennobled by an office or by letters patent from the King. Different principles of ennoblement can be distinguished:

- Noblesse de robe (nobility of the robe): person or family made noble by holding certain official charges, like masters of requests, treasurers, or Presidents of Parlement courts. The noblesse de robe existed by longstanding tradition. In 1600 it gained legal status. High positions in regional parlements, tax boards (chambres des comptes), and other important financial and official state offices (usually bought at high price) conferred nobility, generally in two generations, although membership in the Parlements of Paris, Dauphiné, Besançon and Flanders, as well as on the tax boards of Paris, Dole and Grenoble elevated an official to nobility in one generation.
- Noblesse de chancellerie (nobility of the chancery): commoner made noble by holding certain high offices for the king. The noblesse de chancellerie first appeared during the reign of Charles VIII at the end of the 15th century. To hold the office of chancellor required (with few exceptions) noble status, so non-nobles given the position were raised to the nobility, generally after 20 years of service. Non-nobles paid enormous sums to hold these positions, but this form of nobility was often derided as savonnette à vilain ("soap for serfs").
- Noblesse de cloche ("nobility of the bell") or Noblesse échevinale/Noblesse scabinale ("Nobility of the Aldermen"): person or family made noble by being a mayor (Bourgmestre) or alderman (échevin) or prévôt (Provost, or "municipal functionary") in certain towns (such as Abbeville and Angers, Angoulême, Bourges, Lyon, Toulouse, Paris, Perpignan, and Poitiers). Some towns and cities received the status temporarily or sporadically, like Cognac, Issoudun, La Rochelle, Lyon, Nantes, Niort, Saint-Jean-d'Angély and Tours. There were only 14 such communities by the beginning of the Revolution. The noblesse de cloche dates from 1372 (for the city of Poitiers) and was found only in certain cities with legal and judicial freedoms, such as Toulouse with the capitouls, acquiring nobility as city councillors; by the Revolution these cities were only a handful.
- Noblesse militaire (military nobility): person or family made noble by holding military offices, generally after two or three generations.
- Anoblis par lettres (ennobled through Letters Patent): person made noble by letters patent from after the year 1400. The noblesse de lettres became, starting in the reign of Francis I, a handy method for the court to raise revenues; non-nobles possessing noble fiefs would pay a year's worth of revenues from their fiefs to acquire nobility. In 1598, Henry IV undid a number of these anoblissments, but eventually resumed the practice.

==== Acquisition ====
Depending on the office, the acquisition of nobility could be done in one generation or gradually over several generations:

- Noblesse au premier degré (nobility in the first generation): nobility awarded in the first generation, generally after 20 years of service or by death in one's post.
- Noblesse graduelle: nobility awarded in the second generation, generally after 20 years of service by both father and son.

Once acquired, nobility was hereditary in the legitimate male line for all male and female descendants, with some exceptions of noblesse uterine (through the female line) recognized as valid in the provinces of Champagne and Lorraine.

Wealthy families found ready opportunities to pass into the nobility: although nobility itself could not, legally, be purchased, lands to which noble rights and/or title were attached could be and often were bought by commoners who adopted use of the property's name or title and were henceforth assumed to be noble if they could find a way to be exempted from paying the taille to which only commoners were subject. Moreover, non-nobles who owned noble fiefs were obliged to pay a special tax (franc-fief) on the property to the noble liege-lord.

== Proofs of nobility ==
Henry IV began to enforce the law against usurpation of nobility, and in 1666–1674 Louis XIV mandated a massive program of verification. Oral testimony maintaining that parents and grandparents had been born noble and lived as such were no longer accepted: written proofs (marriage contracts, land documents) proving noble rank since 1560 were required to substantiate noble status. Many families were put back on the lists of the taille and/or forced to pay fines for usurping nobility. Many documents such as notary deeds and contracts were forged, scratched or overwritten resulting in rejections by the crown officers and more fines. During the same period Louis XIV, in dire need of money for wars, issued blank letters-patent of nobility and urged crown officers to sell them to aspiring squires in the Provinces.

The rank of noble was forfeitable: certain activities could cause dérogeance (loss of nobility), within certain limits and exceptions. Most commercial and manual activities, such as tilling land, were strictly prohibited, although nobles could profit from their lands by operating mines, glassworks and forges. A nobleman could emancipate a male heir early, and take on derogatory activities without losing the family's nobility. If nobility was lost through prohibited activities, it could be recovered as soon as the said activities were stopped, by obtaining letters of relief. Finally, certain regions such as Brittany applied loosely these rules allowing poor nobles to plough their own land.

== Privileges ==
From feudal times to the abolition of the privileges in 1789, the French nobility had specific legal and financial rights and prerogatives. The first official list of these prerogatives was established relatively late, under Louis XI after 1440, and included the right to hunt, to wear a sword and to possess a seigneurie (land to which certain feudal rights and dues were attached). Nobles were also granted an exemption from paying the taille, except for non-noble lands they might possess in some regions of France. Furthermore, certain ecclesiastic, civic, and military positions were reserved for nobles. These feudal privileges are often termed droits de féodalité dominante.

== Duties ==
Nobles were required to serve the king. They were required to go to war and fight and die in the service of the king, so called impôt du sang ("blood tax").

== History ==
=== The Fronde and the Wars of Religion ===
Before Louis XIV imposed his will on the nobility, the great families of France often claimed a fundamental right to rebel against unacceptable royal abuse. The Wars of Religion, the Fronde, the civil unrest during the minority of Charles VIII and the regencies of Anne of Austria and Marie de' Medici are all linked to these perceived loss of rights at the hand of a centralizing royal power.

Before and immediately after the Revocation of the Edict of Nantes in 1685, many Protestant noble families emigrated and by doing so lost their lands in France. In certain regions of France a majority of the nobility had turned to Protestantism and their departure significantly depleted the ranks of the nobility. Some were incorporated into the nobility of their countries of adoption.

By relocating the French royal court to Versailles in the 1680s, Louis XIV further modified the role of the nobles. Versailles became a gilded cage: to leave spelled disaster for a noble, for all official charges and appointments were made there. Provincial nobles who refused to join the Versailles system were locked out of important positions in the military or state offices, and lacking royal subsidies (and unable to keep up a noble lifestyle on seigneurial taxes), these rural nobles (hobereaux) often went into debt. A strict etiquette was imposed: a word or glance from the king could make or destroy a career. At the same time, the relocation of the court to Versailles was also a significant political move by Louis. By distracting the nobles with court life, he neutralized a threat to his authority and removed a large obstacle to his ambition to centralize power in France.

Much of the power of nobles in these periods of unrest comes from their "clientèle system". Like the king, nobles granted the use of fiefs, and gave gifts and other forms of patronage to other nobles to develop a vast system of noble clients. Lesser families would send their children to be squires and members of these noble houses, and to learn in them the arts of court society and arms.

The elaboration of the ancien régime state was made possible only by redirecting these clientèle systems to a new focal point (the king and the state), and by creating countervailing powers (the bourgeoisie, the noblesse de robe). By the late 17th century, any act of explicit or implicit protest was treated as a form of lèse-majesté and harshly repressed.

Economic studies of nobility in France at the end of the 18th century, reveal great differences in financial status at this time. A well-off family could earn 100,000–150,000 livres (₶) per year, although the most prestigious families could gain two or three times that much. For provincial nobility, yearly earnings of 10,000 livres permitted a minimum of provincial luxury, but most earned far less. The ethics of noble expenditure, the financial crises of the century and the inability of nobles to participate in most fields without losing their nobility contributed to their relative poverty.

Guy Chaussinand-Nogaret divides the nobility of France into five distinct wealth categories, based on research into the capitation tax, which nobles were also subject to. The first category includes those paying over 500 livres in capitation and enjoying at least 50,000 ₶ in annual income. 250 families in total comprised this group, the majority living in Paris or at court. The second group numbered around 3,500 families with incomes between 10,000 ₶ and 50,000 ₶. These were the rich provincial nobility. In the provinces, their incomes allowed them a lavish lifestyle, and they made up 13% of the nobility. The third group were the 7,000 families whose income was between 4,000 and 10,000 ₶ per annum, which allowed a comfortable life. In the fourth group, 11,000 noble families had between 1,000 and 4,000 ₶ per year. They could still lead a comfortable life provided they were frugal and did not tend toward lavish expenditures. Finally in the fifth group were those with less than 1,000 ₶ per year; over 5,000 noble families lived at this level. Some of them had less than 500 ₶, and some others had 100 or even 50 ₶. This group paid either no or very little capitation tax.

=== The French Revolution ===
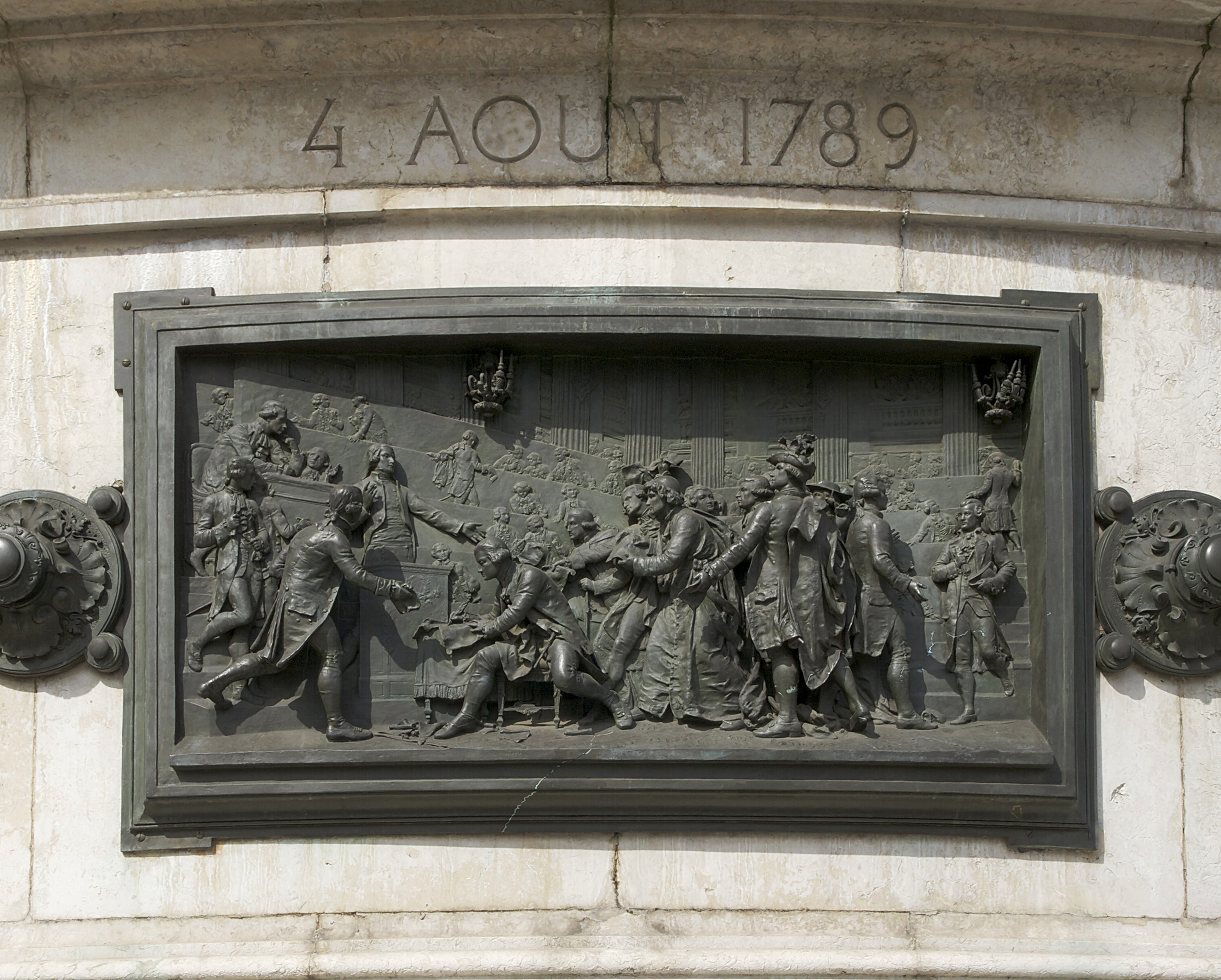
The abolition of privileges, relief by Léopold Morice at the "Monument to the Republic", Paris

At the beginning of the French Revolution, on 4 August 1789, the dozens of small dues that a commoner had to pay to the lord, such as the banalités of manorialism, were abolished by the National Constituent Assembly; noble lands were stripped of their special status as fiefs; the nobility were subjected to the same taxation as their co-nationals, and lost their privileges (the hunt, seigneurial justice, funeral honors). The nobles were, however, allowed to retain their titles. This did not happen immediately. Decrees of application had to be drafted, signed, promulgated and published in the provinces, such that certain noble rights were still being applied well into 1791.

Nevertheless, it was decided that certain annual financial payments which were owed the nobility and which were considered "contractual" (i.e. not stemming from a usurpation of feudal power, but from a contract between a landowner and a tenant) such as annual rents (the cens and the champart) needed to be bought back by the tenant for the tenant to have clear title to his land. Since the feudal privileges of the nobles had been termed droits de feodalité dominante, these were called droits de féodalité contractante. The rate set (3 May 1790) for purchase of these contractual debts was 20 times the annual monetary amount (or 25 times the annual amount if given in crops or goods); peasants were also required to pay back any unpaid dues over the past thirty years. No system of credit was established for small farmers, and only well-off individuals could take advantage of the ruling. This created a massive land grab by well-off peasants and members of the middle-class, who became absentee landowners and had their land worked by sharecroppers and poor tenants.

The Declaration of the Rights of Man and of the Citizen had adopted by vote of the Assembly on 26 August 1789, but the abolition of nobility did not occur at that time. The Declaration declared in its first article that "Men are born free and equal in rights; social distinctions may be based only upon general usefulness." It was not until 19 June 1790 that hereditary titles of nobility were abolished. The notions of equality and fraternity won over some nobles such as the Marquis de Lafayette who supported the abolition of legal recognition of nobility, but other liberal nobles who had happily sacrificed their fiscal privileges saw this as an attack on the culture of honor.

=== The First Empire ===
From 1808 to 1815 during the First Empire the Emperor Napoléon bestowed titles, which the ensuing Bourbon Restoration acknowledged as a new nobility by the Charter of 4 June 1814 granted by King Louis XVIII.

Napoleon also established a new knightly order in 1802, the Légion d'honneur, which still exists but is no longer hereditary. He decreed that after three generations of legionaries created knights by letters patent, they would receive hereditary nobility, but a small number of French families meet the requirement and the decree was abrogated and no longer applied.

=== The Restoration, July Monarchy and Second Empire (1814–1870) ===
From 1814 to 1848 (Bourbon Restoration and July Monarchy) and from 1852 to 1870 (Second French Empire) the French nobility was restored as an hereditary distinction without privileges, and new hereditary titles were granted.

Nobility and titles of nobility were abolished in 1848 during the French Revolution of 1848, but hereditary titles were restored in 1852 by decree of the emperor Napoleon III.

=== From the Third Republic (1870) to today ===
Since the French Third Republic on 4 September 1870 the French nobility is no longer recognized and has no legal existence and status. The ancient regularly transmitted authentic titles can however be recognized as part of a name, after a request to the Department of Justice. The Grand Livre du Sceau is indeed the official register of the French nobility, equivalent to the British Roll of the Peerage; it is maintained and updated by the Ministry of Justice, and hereditary titles are still formally recorded in it.

== Aristocratic codes ==
The idea of what it meant to be noble went through a radical transformation from the 16th to the 17th centuries. Through contact with the Italian Renaissance and their concept of the perfect courtier (Baldassare Castiglione), the rude warrior class was remodeled into what the 17th century would come to call l'honnête homme ('the honest or upright man'), among whose chief virtues were eloquent speech, skill at dance, refinement of manners, appreciation of the arts, intellectual curiosity, wit, a spiritual or platonic attitude in love, and the ability to write poetry. Most notable of noble values are the aristocratic obsession with glory (la gloire) and majesty (la grandeur) and the spectacle of power, prestige, and luxury. For example, Pierre Corneille's noble heroes have been criticised by modern readers who have seen their actions as vainglorious, criminal, or hubristic; aristocratic spectators of the period would have seen many of these same actions as representative of their noble station.

The château of Versailles, court ballets, noble portraits, and triumphal arches were all representations of glory and prestige. The notion of glory (military, artistic, etc.) was seen in the context of the Roman Imperial model; it was not seen as vain or boastful, but as a moral imperative to the aristocratic classes. Nobles were required to be "generous" and "magnanimous", to perform great deeds disinterestedly (i.e. because their status demanded it – whence the expression noblesse oblige – and without expecting financial or political gain), and to master their own emotions, especially fear, jealousy, and the desire for vengeance. One's status in the world demanded appropriate externalisation (or conspicuous consumption). Nobles indebted themselves to build prestigious urban mansions (hôtels particuliers) and to buy clothes, paintings, silverware, dishes, and other furnishings befitting their rank. They were also required to show liberality by hosting sumptuous parties and by funding the arts.

Conversely, social parvenus who took on the external trappings of the noble classes (such as the wearing of a sword) were severely criticised, sometimes by legal action; laws on sumptuous clothing worn by the bourgeois existed since the Middle Ages.

Traditional aristocratic values began to be criticised in the mid-17th century: Blaise Pascal, for example, offered a ferocious analysis of the spectacle of power and François de La Rochefoucauld posited that no human act – however generous it pretended to be – could be considered disinterested.

== Titles ==
Nobility and hereditary titles were distinct; while all hereditary titleholders were noble, most nobles were untitled, although many assumed courtesy titles.

The authentic titles of nobility would be created or recognized by letters patent of the sovereign. If a title was not created or recognized by the sovereign, it was a courtesy title without legal status or rank. Generally, the titles were hereditary but could sometimes be personal. Under the Ancien Régime (before the French Revolution of 1789), titles were linked to a land called fiefs de dignité.

- Prince (during the First French Empire): Under the Ancien Régime some families were possessors of lordships called a principality (principauté) and sometimes the king recognized them the use of this title but as a title of courtesy without any rank.
- Duc (duke)
- Marquis (marquess)
- Comte (count)
- Vicomte (viscount)
- Vidame: a rare title, always with the name of a diocese, as their origin was as the commander of a bishop's forces
- Baron
- Chevalier (knight, during the First French Empire); also borne by nobles who belonged to an order of chivalry

During the Ancien Régime, there was no distinction of rank by title (except for the title of duke, which was often associated with the strictly regulated privileges of the peerage, including precedence above other titled nobles). The hierarchy within the French nobility below peers was initially based on seniority; a count whose family had been noble since the 14th century was higher ranked than a marquis whose title only dated to the 18th century. Precedence at the royal court was based on the family's ancienneté, its alliances (marriages), its hommages (dignities and offices held) and, lastly, its illustrations (record of deeds and achievements).

Note:

- Écuyer (esquire) was not a noble title, but an honorific or courtesy title borne by untitled nobles to indicate that they were noble.
- Seigneur ("Lord of the manor" and literally: "lord"): indicated a landlord's property but it did not indicate the owner was noble, especially after the 17th century.
- Titles worn by members of the royal family (dauphin, Prince du Sang etc.) were not titles of nobility but titles of dignity.

The use of the nobiliary particle de in a name is not a sign of nobility. In the 18th and 19th centuries, the de was adopted by large numbers of non-nobles (like Honoré de Balzac or Gérard de Nerval) in an attempt to appear noble. It has been estimated that today 90% of names with a particle are non-noble and a few authentic "extraction" nobles have no particle at all.

Noble hierarchies were further complicated by the creation of chivalric orders – the Chevaliers du Saint-Esprit (Knights of the Holy Spirit) created by Henry III in 1578; the Ordre de Saint-Michel created by Louis XI in 1469; the Order of Saint Louis created by Louis XIV in 1696 – by official posts, and by positions in the Royal House (the Great Officers of the Crown of France), such as grand maître de la garde-robe ('grand master of the wardrobe', the royal dresser) or grand panetier (royal bread server), which had long ceased to be actual functions and had become nominal and formal positions with their own privileges. The 17th and 18th centuries saw nobles and the noblesse de robe compete with each other for these positions and any other signs of royal favor.

== Heraldry ==
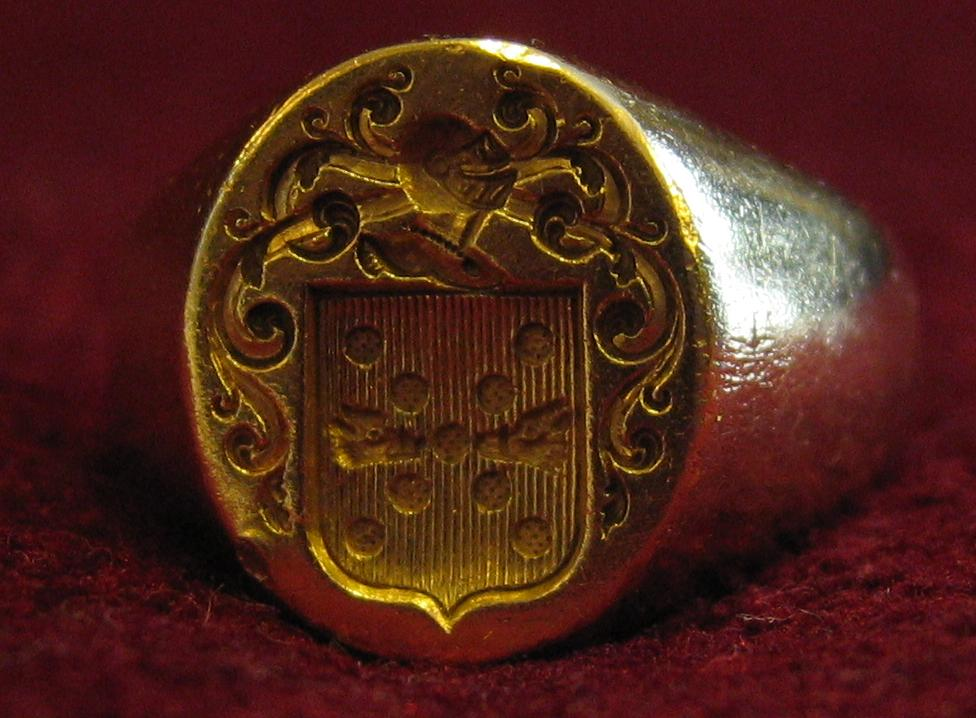
A signet ring with coat of arms

In France, by the 16th century the signet ring (chevalière) bearing a coat of arms was not a sign or proof of nobility, as many bourgeois families were allowed to register their arms, and they often wore them as a pretense of nobility.

However, all noble families did have a registered coat of arms. The ring was traditionally worn by Frenchmen on the ring finger of their left hand, contrary to usage in most other European countries (where it is worn on the little finger of either the right or left hand, depending on the country); French women, however, wore it on their left little finger. Daughters sometimes wore the signet ring of their mother if the father lacked a coat of arms, but a son would not. Originally, its purpose was practical and was worn by nobles and officials in the Middle Ages to press down and seal the hot wax with their coat of arms for identification on official letters, but this function became degraded over time as more non-nobles wore them for perceived status.

The chevalière may either be worn facing up (en baise-main) or facing toward the palm (en bagarre). In contemporary usage, the inward position is increasingly common, although some noble families traditionally use the inward position to indicate that the wearer is married. There is no legal or formal control or protection over signet ring carrying.

== Symbolic crowns ==
=== Ancien Régime ===
Duke and Peer of France	Duke	Marquis	Count	Viscount	Vidame	Baron	Knight

=== First Empire ===
Prince	Duke	Count	Baron	Knight

== Peerage ==
- Peerage of France
  - List of French peerages/List of French peers
    - Dukes in France and List of French dukedoms
  - List of coats of arms of French peers
- Seigneurial system of New France
