= Duke of Choiseul =

Coat of arms of the 1st Duke of Choiseul

The Duke of Choiseul is a title in the Peerage of France, created twice for the benefit of members of the House of Choiseul; three other duchies (Amboise, Praslin, Stainville) are also commonly associated with the name of Choiseul.

== Dukes of Choiseul (1665) ==
Duchy-peerage created in 1665 from the lordships of Polisy, Polisot, Buzeuil, Fols, Bourguignons and dependencies for Marshal César de Choiseul, Count of Plessis-Praslin (the Plessis-Praslins form a cadet branch of the Choiseul-Praslins, themselves a cadet branch of the Choiseul-Chevignys noted below), a general in the service of Louis XIV.

- 1665–1675 : César de Choiseul
- 1675–1684 : Caesar II Auguste de Choiseul
- 1684–1705 : Caesar III Auguste de Choiseul. Upon his death without a male heir, the duchy became extinct.

== Dukes of Stainville, known as Choiseul or Choiseul-Stainville (1758) ==
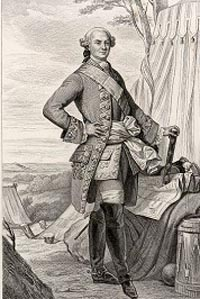
Jacques Philippe de Choiseul, Duke of Stainville

Duchy-peerage created in 1758 for Étienne François de Choiseul-Beaupré, Count of Stainville, Marquis of Estainville and of La Bourdaisière, famous minister of Louis XV, distant cousin of the Dukes of Choiseul and Counts of Plessis-Praslin mentioned above. When the Duke died without an heir in 1785, the duchy became extinct.

In 1786, Jacques Philippe de Choiseul, Marshal of France, younger brother of Étienne François, was made Duke of Choiseul-Stainville "with patent".

== Dukes of Praslin, known as Choiseul-Praslin (1762) ==
Duchy-peerage created in 1762 for César Gabriel de Choiseul, Count of Chevigny. The seat of the duchy was at Montgauger, then at Vaux-le-Vicomte in 1764 (then called Vaux-Praslin; the name of Praslin evokes a fief of the Choiseul marquis of Praslin, who constituted a cadet branch of the Choiseul-Chevigny; a cadet branch of the Choiseul-Chevigny was that of the Plessis-Praslin, first Dukes of Choiseul above; the elder branch, that of the Counts of Chevigny, took the name of its cadet branch to title its duchy: Praslin; the Chevigny were a younger branch of the Choiseul d'Aigremont, of which an elder branch, that of the Choiseul-Beaupré, was represented by the minister of Louis XV below.

== Dukes of Amboise, known as Choiseul d'Amboise (1764) ==
Duchy-peerage created in 1764 from the barony of Amboise, lands, fiefs and baronies annexed for the minister of Louis XV, already Duke of Choiseul-Stainville. Like the Duchy of Stainville, it died out on the death of its holder in 1785.

== Dukes of Choiseul (1787) ==
Duchy-peerage created in 1787 on the lands of Pesmes (Haute-Saône, former marquisate of La Baume-Montrevel) by King Louis XVI in favor of Claude de Choiseul-Beaupré, cousin and husband of the niece of the minister Duke of Choiseul-Stainville and Amboise above, who made Claude his adopted son and heir for the county of Stainville. This Duke of Choiseul was a member of the Chamber of Peers under the French Restoration and the July Monarchy: Duke and hereditary peer (letters patent of 20 December 1814, without additional charge).

The transmission of the ducal title to his son-in-law, Philippe-Gabriel de Marmier, 1st Duke of Marmier, was authorized by royal decree of 15 May 1818. It took effect by letters patent of 30 March 1839 (under the name of Duke of Marmier), but without the peerage, the hereditary nature of the peerage having been abolished.

== See also ==
- List of French dukedoms
