= John, Duke of Touraine =

John
- Duke of Touraine
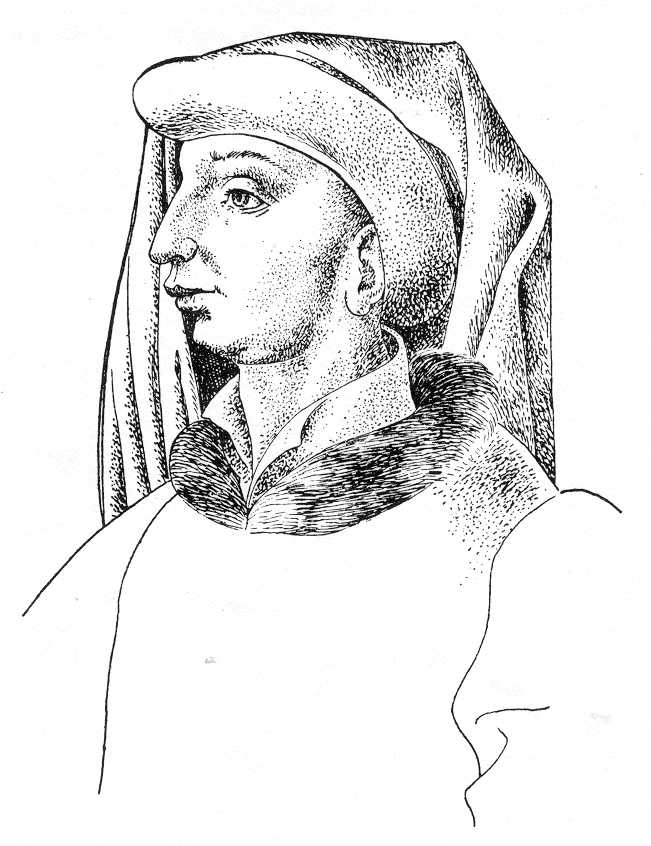

Dauphin of France
- Reign: 8 December 1415 – 5 April 1417
- Predecessor: Louis, Duke of Guyenne
- Successor: Charles, Count of Ponthieu
- Born: 31 August 1398
- Died: 5 April 1417 (aged 18); Compiègne
- Burial: Saint-Corneille Abbey
- Spouse: Jacqueline of Hainaut (m. 1415)
- House: Valois
- Father: Charles VI of France
- Mother: Isabeau of Bavaria

John, Dauphin of France and Duke of Touraine (French: Jean de France, duc de Touraine; 31 August 1398 – 5 April 1417) was Dauphin of Viennois and Duke of Touraine. He inherited the Dauphin of Viennois in 1415, following the death of his older brother, Louis, Duke of Guyenne. He died 5 April 1417, and was succeeded by his brother Charles, Count of Ponthieu.

== Early life ==
John was born in 1398, the fourth son of Charles VI of France and Isabeau of Bavaria. At the age of four (in Paris on 5 May 1403) and again at the age of seven (in Compiègne on 29 June 1406), he was betrothed to Jacqueline, heiress of the County of Hainaut, Holland and Zealand. After his betrothal to Jacqueline, he was brought up alongside her at the castle of Le Quesnoy in Hainaut, at the court of his future mother-in-law, Margaret of Burgundy. This arrangement was made between his father and his future father-in-law to ensure his safety away from the tumultuous court in Paris, as well as to acquaint him with the lands which he would rule as husband of Jacqueline after her father's death. As he was the king's fourth son, he was only expected to succeed to his wife's lands, and was not expected to become king.

On 22 April 1411 the Pope gave his dispensation for the union and on 6 August 1415, when John was sixteen, he and Jacqueline married in The Hague.

== Dauphin ==
Four months after his marriage, John's elder brother Louis, Duke of Guyenne and Dauphin of France, died on 18 December 1415, and John became the next Dauphin of France.

== Death ==
John died on 5 April 1417 at the age of eighteen. The cause of his death is disputed. According to some, he died from the consequences of an abscess in the head, while other sources suggest he had been poisoned. He was buried in Compiègne's Saint-Corneille abbey. His younger brother Charles, Count of Ponthieu became Dauphin and eventually king in 1422.

== Sources ==
- Vale, Malcolm Graham Allan (1974). Charles the Seventh. University of California Press.
- Vaughan, Richard (2005). John the Fearless: The Growth of Burgundian Power. Vol. 2. The Boydell Press.

John, Duke of Touraine House of Valois Cadet branch of the Capetian dynasty Born: 31 August 1398 Died: 5 April 1417
Regnal titles
Preceded by Louis I	Dauphin of Viennois; 8 December 1415 – 5 April 1417	Succeeded by Charles the Victorious
Vacant Royal domain Title last held by Louis II	Duke of Touraine; 1407 – 5 April 1417	Succeeded by Charles the Victorious
Vacant Royal domain Title last held by Edward III	Count of Ponthieu; 1410 – 5 April 1417	Succeeded by Charles the Victorious
Preceded by John I	Duke of Berry; Count of Poitou; 1416 – 5 April 1417	Succeeded by Charles the Victorious
