= Duke of Touraine =

Title in the Peerage of France

Duke of Touraine was a title in the Peerage of France, relating to Touraine.

Arms of Philip the Bold as Duke of Touraine. Nowadays, they are arms of Touraine and Indre-et-Loire

It was first created in 1360 for Philip the Bold, youngest son of King John II of France. He returned the duchy to the Crown in 1363 on being made Duke of Burgundy and died in 1404.

The next creation was in 1386 for Louis, youngest son of King Charles V of France. He returned the duchy to the Crown in 1392 on being made Duke of Orléans and died in 1407.

The third creation was in 1401 for John, fourth son of King Charles VI of France. He became Dauphin of France in 1415 and died unmarried in 1417.

The next creation was in 1416 for Charles, youngest son of King Charles VI of France, who succeeded his brother as dauphin in 1417. He succeeded as King Charles VII of France in 1422 when the title merged in the Crown.

The fifth creation was in 1423 for the Scottish nobleman Archibald Douglas, 4th Earl of Douglas, a commander on the French side in the Hundred Years' War. He was killed at the Battle of Verneuil in 1424. His son Lord Wigtown, absent in Scotland, was believed in France to have died without issue, so the title was presumed extinct. When it became apparent that Wigtown had succeeded his father as Earl of Douglas, he was confirmed in the title Duke of Touraine, though not the lands. He died in 1439 and the male line of the fourth Earl of Douglas became extinct on the death of William Douglas, 6th Earl of Douglas, the following year.

The land of Touraine was given, by letters-patent in Bourges on 21 October 1424, to Duke Louis III of Anjou.

On 8th September 1434, the title was awarded to Sir John FitzAlan, 7th Earl of Arundel while fighting for the English in the Hundred Years’ War. The grant was made as a reward for his campaigns in France and in the hope that he would do service in the area. John was very successful with his campaigns, he made a big presence in France. He died in 1435 from a battle wound in the Battle of Gerberoy. Which then the title most probably went back under French rule.

In 1528, the land of Touraine was given by King Francis I of France to his mother, Louise of Savoy, in exchange for the Duchy of Nemours, given to her in 1523.

The next creation was in 1576 for Francis, youngest son of King Henry II of France, who was created Duke of Anjou and Berry at the same time. He died unmarried in 1584, when the title became extinct.

== Modern courtesy title ==
The title of "Duke of Touraine" was awarded in 1981 by the legitimist pretender, Alfonso, Duke of Anjou and Cádiz, to his second son, Louis Alphonse. Following his brother's death in 1984 and that of his father in 1989, he respectively became, under the same pretension, "Duke of Bourbon" and "Duke of Anjou". He is the current legitimist pretender to the title of King of France as "Louis XX".

He, in turn, re-created the title for his third son, Henri, born 1 February 2019; having previously conferred on his twin sons, the titles of "Dauphin of France, Duke of Burgundy" and "Duke of Berry" respectively.
