= Duke of Berry =

Title in the French peerage

- Creation date: October 1360
- Created by: John II of France
- Peerage: Peerage of France
- First holder: John of Berry
- Last holder: Charles Ferdinand of Artois
- Extinction date: 14 February 1820

Duke of Berry (French: Duc de Berry) or Duchess of Berry (French: Duchesse de Berry) was a title in the Peerage of France. The Duchy of Berry, centred on Bourges, was originally created as an appanage for junior members of the Capetian dynasty and was frequently granted to female royals. The style "Duke of Berry" was later granted by several Bourbon monarchs to their grandsons. The last official Duke of Berry was Charles Ferdinand of Artois, son of King Charles X. The title Duke of Berry is currently being claimed through its usage as a courtesy title by Alphonse de Bourbon, son of Louis Alphonse de Bourbon, the Legitimist claimant to the French Throne.

== House of Valois (1360-1505) ==
On October 1360, King John II created the peerage-duchy of Berry as an appanage for his third-born son, John of Poitiers, perhaps on the occasion of his marriage with Joan of Armagnac. Upon his death in 1416, John of Poitiers was succeeded as Duke of Berry by his grandnephew John, Dauphin of France (having been predeceased in 1397 by his only son who survived into adulthood, Jean d'Valois, Count of Montpensier). After Dauphin John's death in 1417, the appanage passed to his younger brother, Dauphin Charles, who subsequently moved his court to Berry's capital of Bourges to escape the advancing English during the Hundred Years' War. When the Dauphin ascended to the throne as Charles VII, Berry returned to the royal domain.

In 1461, Louis XI granted Berry to his younger brother, Charles. Charles maintained a rivalry with his brother and joined the League of the Public Weal, an anti-royal alliance of French magnates led by the Charles the Bold, the Count of Charolais. After a short war against Louis XI, which was concluded with the Treaty of Conflans in 1465, Charles gained the Duchy of Normandy (which he later exchanged for Guyenne in 1469). Charles died without legitimate issue in 1472 due to syphilis, although some believed he was a victim of poisoning. With no male heir, the title reverted to the Crown once again.

In 1498, Louis XII granted Berry to his former wife Joan of France, daughter of Louis XI, as compensation for their marriage's annulment. She was the first suo jure duchess, and after her death without issue, Berry returned to the Crown.

Duke	Birth	Tenure	Death	Marriage(s) Issue
John of France Other titles List: Duke of Auvergne; Count of Poitiers; Count of Montpensier; Count of Étampes	30 November 1340; Château de Vincennes Son of John II of France and Bonne of Luxembourg	October 1360 – 15 June 1416	15 June 1416; Paris Died by natural causes (aged 75)	(1) Joan of Armagnac (m. 1360; d. 1387); 5 children (2) Joan II of Auvergne (m. 1389; wid. 1416); Childless
John of France Other titles List: Dauphin of France; Count of Ponthieu; Count of Poitou	31 August 1398; Paris Son of Charles VI of France and Isabeau of Bavaria	1416 – 5 April 1417	5 April 1417; Compiègne Died by natural causes (aged 18)	Jacqueline of Hainaut (m. 1415; wid. 1417); Childless
Charles of France Other titles List: Dauphin of France; Count of Ponthieu; Count of Poitou	22 February 1403; Paris Son of Charles VI of France and Isabeau of Bavaria	1417 – 1422 (merged with Crown)	22 July 1461; Mehun-sur-Yèvre Died by natural causes (aged 58)	Marie of Anjou (m. 1422; wid. 1461); 14 children
Charles of France Other titles List: Duke of Normandy; Duke of Guyenne	26 December 1446; Château de Tours Son of Charles VII of France and Marie of Anjou	November 1461 – 24 May 1472	24 May 1472; Bordeaux Died by syphilis (aged 25)	Never married
Joan of France	23 April 1464; Nogent-le-Roi Daughter of Louis XI and Charlotte of Savoy	7 April 1498 – 4 February 1505	4 February 1505; Bourges, Berry Died by natural causes (aged 40)	Louis II, Duke of Orléans (then Louis XII) (m. 1476; ann. 1498); Childless

== House of Valois-Angoulême (1527-1601) ==
In 1527, King Francis I granted his sister Marguerite the duchy of Berry, probably on the occasion of her marriage to Henry II of Navarre. After her death without male issue in 1549, Berry reverted to the Crown.

In 1550, King Henry II granted Berry to his sister Margaret of Valois for life. After the death of Margaret of Valois in 1574, her nephew King Henry III granted Berry and the County of La Marche to his sister-in-law and Queen dowager of France Elisabeth of Austria. However, in 1577, as a consequence of the Peace of Monsieur, Elisabeth of Austria was forced by King Henry III to exchange Berry and La Marche (which then became part of the expanded appanage of his brother Francis, Duke of Anjou) for the duchies of Auvergne and Bourbon. After Francis of Anjou's death in 1584, Berry and his other appanages again returned to the Crown.

In 1589, King Henry IV granted Berry to King Henry III's widow Louise of Lorraine for her lifetime.

Duke	Birth	Tenure	Death	Marriage(s) Issue
Margaret of Navarre Other titles List: Queen consort of Navarre; Duchess of Alençon; Countess of Armagnac; Countess of Perche	11 April 1492; Château d'Angoulême Daughter of Charles of Orléans and Louise of Savoy	24 January 1527 – 21 December 1549	21 December 1549; Odos, Navarre Died by natural causes (aged 57)	(1) Charles IV of Alençon (m. 1509; d. 1525); Childless (2) Henry II of Navarre (m. 1527; wid. 1549); 1 child
Margaret of France Other titles List: Duchess consort of Savoy	5 June 1523; Saint-Germain-en-Laye Daughter of Francis I and Claude of Brittany	29 April 1550 – 15 September 1574	15 September 1574; Turin, Savoy Died by natural causes (aged 51)	Emmanuel Philibert of Savoy (m. 1559; wid. 1574); 1 child
Elisabeth of Austria Other titles List: Countess of La Marche	5 July 1554; Vienna, Austria Daughter of Emperor Maximilian II and Mary of Austria	21 November 1575 – 25 September 1577 (Title forfeited)	22 January 1592; Vienna, Austria Died by pleurisy (aged 37)	Charles IX of France (m. 1570; d. 1574); 1 child
Francis of France Other titles List: Duke of Anjou; Duke of Alençon; Duke of Touraine	18 March 1555; Château de Fontainebleau Son of Henry II and Catherine de' Medici	25 September 1577 – 10 June 1584	10 June 1584; Château-Thierry Died by malaria (aged 29)	Never married
Louise of Lorraine	30 April 1553; Nomeny, Barrois Daughter of Nicolas, Duke of Mercœur and Margaret of Egmont	August 1589 – 29 January 1601	29 January 1601; Moulins, Bourbonnais Died by natural causes (aged 47)	Henry III of France (m. 1575; d. 1589); Childless

== House of Bourbon (1686-1820) ==
In 1686, King Louis XIV granted the title Duke of Berry to his third grandson Charles who continued to use it as his primary title until his death in 1714, despite never gaining the appanage of Berry. In 1754, King Louis XV styled his newborn grandson Louis-Auguste as Duke of Berry until his ascension as Dauphin of France in 1765, after his father's death.

In 1778, King Louis XVI re-established the Duchy of Berry as an appanage for his newborn nephew, Charles Ferdinand of Artois, who was killed in 1820 by Louis Pierre Louvel, a Bonapartist.

Duke	Birth	Tenure	Death	Marriage(s) Issue
Charles of France Other titles List: Duke of Angoulême; Duke of Alençon; Count of Ponthieu	31 July 1686; Versailles Son of Louis, Dauphin of France and Maria Anna of Bavaria	31 July 1686 – 5 May 1714	5 May 1714; Versailles Died in hunting accident (aged 27)	Louise Élisabeth d'Orléans (m. 1710; wid. 1714); Childless
Louis-Auguste of France (then Louis XVI)	23 August 1754; Versailles Son of Louis, Dauphin of France and Maria Josepha of Saxony	23 August 1754 – 20 December 1765 (Became Dauphin)	21 January 1793; Place de la Révolution, Paris Executed for treason (aged 38)	Marie Antoinette of Austria (m. 1770; wid. 1793); 4 children
Charles Ferdinand of Artois	24 January 1778; Versailles Son of Charles of Artois and Maria Theresa of Savoy	24 January 1778 – 14 February 1820	14 February 1820; Outside Paris Opera Murdered by Louis Pierre Louvel (aged 42)	Marie-Caroline of Sicily (m. 1816; wid. 1820); 2 children

== See also ==
- House of France
- Très Riches Heures du Duc de Berry
- Belles Heures du Duc de Berry
