= Succession of Henry IV of France =

Henry III of Navarre's accession as King of France

Henry IV of France's succession
- Part of the French Wars of Religion
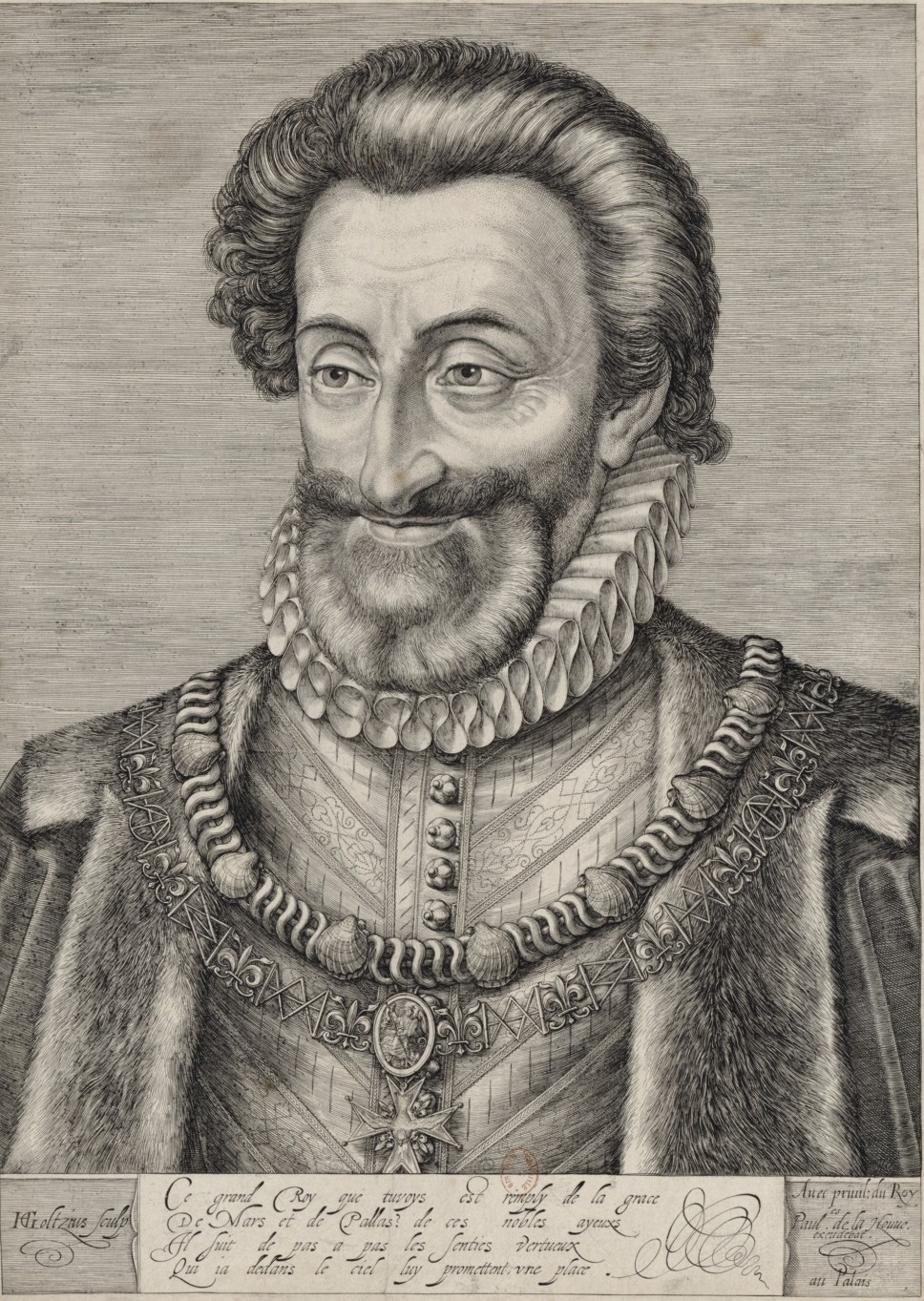
- King Henry IV of France, until 1589 known as Henry of Navarre. 17th century engraving by Henri Goltzius.
Date	August 1589 – March 1594
Location	France
Result	Henry IV of France is recognised as king in most of France after converting to Roman Catholicism and under the condition of tolerance towards Protestants; Continued Catholic resistance with Spanish support leads Henry IV to declare French Wars of Religion in January 1595

Belligerents
(Kingdom of France) Politiques and Protestants: Huguenots; England	Catholics: Catholic League; Spain

Commanders and leaders
(Kingdom of France) Henry IV of France	Charles de Bourbon

Henry IV's succession to the French throne in 1589 was followed by a war of succession to establish his legitimacy, which was part of the French Wars of Religion (1562–1598). He inherited the throne after the assassination of Henry III, the last Valois king, who died without children. Henry IV was already King of Navarre, as the successor of his mother, Jeanne III of Navarre, but he owed his succession to the throne of France to the line of his father, Antoine of Bourbon, an agnatic descendant of Louis IX. He was the first French king from the House of Bourbon.

Henry's succession in 1589 proved far from straightforward. He and King Henry III were moving to besiege Paris at the time of the latter's death. The city and large parts of France, mostly in the north, were in the hands of the Catholic League, an alliance of leading Catholic nobles and prelates who opposed the Protestant Henry of Navarre as heir to the throne. Instead, they recognized Henry's uncle Charles of Bourbon as the heir, and on Henry III's assassination they declared Charles king. As a result, Henry IV was forced to fight a civil war to assert his position as king, followed by a war against Spain, which continued to question his legitimacy.

After the death of Charles of Bourbon, the Catholic League's failure to choose a replacement claimant to the throne, in combination with Henry IV's conversion to Catholicism, led to a general recognition of the king in France. Henry IV's successors ruled France until the French Revolution, then returned during subsequent Bourbon restorations, and they founded dynasties in Spain and the Kingdom of the Two Sicilies.

== Bourbon claim to throne ==
Henry of Navarre was descended through his father from King Louis IX of France. Robert, Count of Clermont (d. 1317), the sixth and youngest son of Louis IX but the only son besides Philip III to produce a surviving line, had married Beatrix of Bourbon and assumed the title of sire de Bourbon. Bourbon was elevated into a duchy for Robert's son Louis, who became the first Duke of Bourbon.

Branches of the House of Bourbon

House of Bourbon
Dukes of Bourbon	Bourbon-La Marche
Counts of Montpensier	Counts of La Marche	Counts of Vendôme	Bourbon-Carency
Bourbon-Vendôme	Dukes of Montpensier
Kings of Navarre	Princes of Condé

At the death of Charles IV, Duke of Alençon in 1525, all cadet branches of the House of Valois had become extinct, with the only remaining Valois being the royal family itself. The chief of the Bourbons became the first prince of the blood, the closest to the succession to the throne should the immediate family of the king become extinct. At the death of Charles III, Duke of Bourbon in 1527, the Vendôme branch of the House of Bourbon became the senior line of the family. At that time, Charles de Bourbon was Duke of Vendôme. His son Antoine de Bourbon married the Queen of Navarre, a niece of King Francis I. Antoine's son, Prince Henry of Navarre, inherited this title on his death from an arquebus wound at the siege of Rouen in 1562.

The legitimacy of Henry of Navarre's claim to the throne was still questioned, however. In similar cases, the throne had earlier passed to successors with a much closer blood link to the throne. Louis XII had succeeded Charles VIII as his second cousin once removed in the male line. Francis I had succeeded Louis XII as his first cousin once removed in the male line. The successions were legally unproblematic because consanguinity was acknowledged in law to the tenth degree. Henry of Navarre, on the other hand, could claim only an agnatic relationship to Henry III in the twenty-second degree. When Henry had become the heir presumptive to the throne in 1584, on the death of Francis, Duke of Anjou, polemicist Jean Boucher had been among those who protested that such a distance in blood meant Henry's claim to the throne had effectively lapsed and that therefore the French States-General had the right to elect a new king.

When Henry was a boy, it seemed highly unlikely that he would ever inherit the throne of France since Henry II had produced four surviving sons. However, the prince of Navarre's pedigree gave him a special place of honour in the French nobility since all scions of the Bourbon line were acknowledged as the princes of the blood. As Head of the House of Bourbon, Henry was officially the First Prince of the Blood, the first nobleman of the kingdom.

The importance of the princes of the blood had been demonstrated when Antoine of Navarre's uncle Francis, Count of Enghien (d. 1546) had commanded the victorious royal armies at the battle of Ceresole in 1544. It was to be further demonstrated when Antoine of Bourbon's last surviving brother, Cardinal Charles (d. 1590), was chosen by the Catholic nobles as King of France in the face of Henry IV's Protestantism. Catherine de' Medici had ensured her regency of the nine-year-old King Charles IX in 1560 only by making a deal with Antoine of Bourbon, who many considered had the right, as First Prince of the Blood, to be the regent.

In a kingdom that the Salic Law excluded women from succession to the throne, Catherine had overcome prejudice against government by a woman and been elected governor (gouvernante) of France with sweeping powers. However, she accepted that none of her three daughters would ever inherit the French throne. By 1572, only two of her sons remained alive; she brokered a marriage between her daughter Margaret and Henry, who that year became King Henry III of Navarre after the death of his mother, Jeanne d'Albret, while she was buying clothes for the wedding in Paris. The marriage was intended to unite the interests of the house of Valois with the house of Bourbon.

Henry of Navarre always emphasised the significance of his blood, rather than religion, when he challenged the Guise-led Catholic League. After the League forced Henry III to sign the Treaty of Nemours, which excluded Navarre from the succession, in July 1585, the latter issued a manifesto condemning the pact as:

A peace made with foreigners at the expense of the princes of the blood; with the House of Lorraine at the expense of the House of France; with rebels at the expense of obedient subjects; with agitators at the expense of those who have brought peace by every means within their power [...] I intend to oppose it with all my heart, and to this end to rally around me [...] all true Frenchmen without regard to religion, since this time it is a question of the defence of the state against the usurpation of foreigners.

The pull of such propaganda remained so potent that even after 25 years of civil war, an English agent reported that after that and similar declarations by Henry, "many good Catholics flocked to his standard".

== Kingdom of Navarre ==
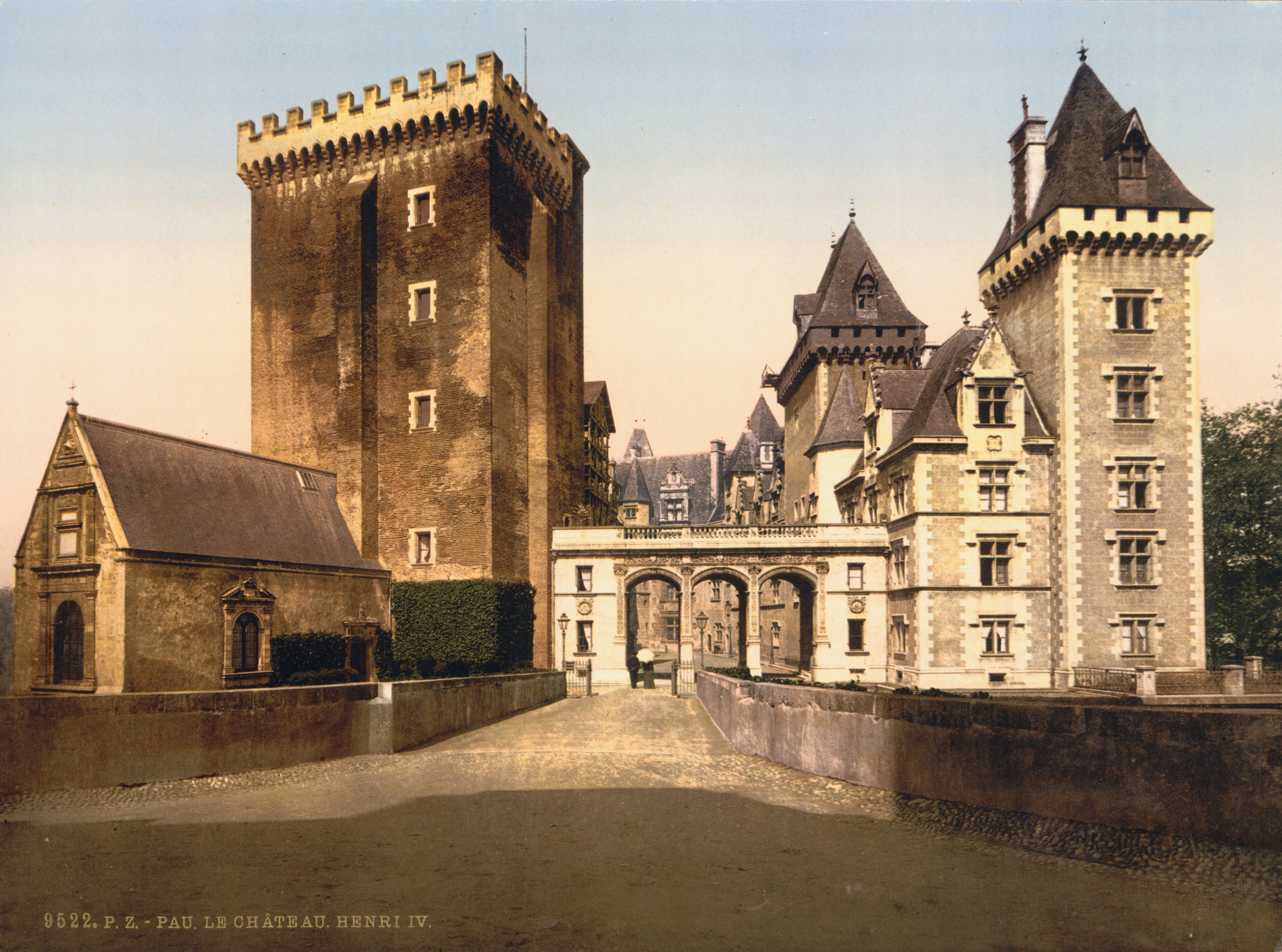
Château of Pau, where Henry of Navarre was born in 1553

Though most of the old Kingdom of Navarre was incorporated into Spain, the claim to the remaining part was retained by Queen Catherine (daughter of Magdalene of France), who married John, Count of Périgord, brother-in-law of Cesare Borgia and lord of vast lands in the southwest of France. John was chased out of Spanish Navarre by Ferdinand II of Aragon in 1512 and retreated to Navarre north of the Pyrenees, and the Navarrese Cortes (parliament) accepted annexation to Castile. The part that survived as an independent kingdom north of the Pyrenees, Lower Navarre, was united with the Viscountcy of Béarn in an independent kingdom. It was given a representative assembly by Catherine and John's son, Henry II of Navarre. By the time of Henry III of Navarre (the future Henry IV of France), the monarch of Navarre could call to arms 300 gentlemen and 6,000 footsoldiers from the kingdom.

== Rival claimants ==
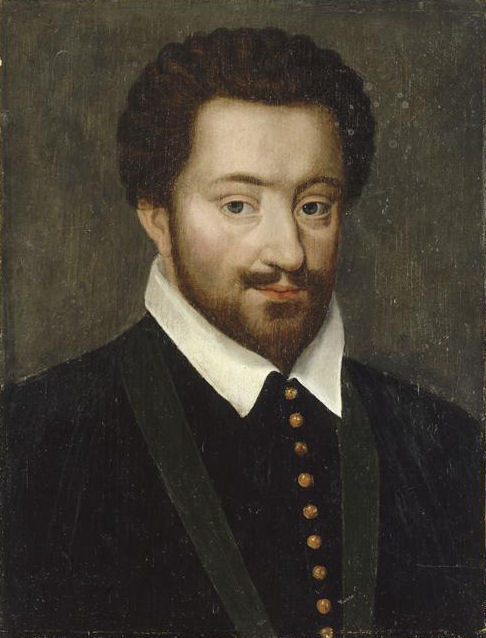
Charles of Lorraine, Duke of Mayenne

The Catholic League's candidate for the crown of France in 1589 was Charles, Cardinal de Bourbon. The brother of Antoine of Bourbon (and Henry of Navarre's uncle), he was the last surviving Catholic prince of the blood. However, two factors made him an unconvincing choice: he was 66 years old, and he was firmly in the custody of first Henry III and then Henry IV. The cardinal found himself imprisoned in 1588, when Henry III ordered the murder of Henry, Duke of Guise, at the Château of Blois and rounded up those he regarded as a threat to his crown, including the Cardinal of Bourbon. On Henry III's death, Henry IV assumed responsibility for his captive rival. The League proved unable to free the cardinal, and when he died on 9 May 1590, they were left without a plausible successor as claimant to the throne. That proved fatal to their opposition to Henry's rule.

During the period between the succession of Henry IV and the death of the Cardinal of Bourbon, the city of Paris had achieved a degree of independence. While acknowledging the Catholic League and accepting a Spanish garrison, the authorities there had championed their liberties against those of the crown so much that some citizens openly opposed the institution of monarchy altogether. In October 1589, a Parisian lawyer complained publicly, "Our civil disorder and factions have opened the door to a crowd of corrupt little men who, with effrontery, have attacked authority with such licence and audacity that those who have not seen it would not believe it. In so doing, they have wanted to jump from a monarchy to a democracy".

The death of the Cardinal of Bourbon prompted measures to elect a new anti-king. Although the French monarchy was hereditary, the League's lawyers searched the early history of France for precedents to legitimise the election of a king. The Protestant scholar and ideologue François Hotman had argued in his Francogallia that France was once a free country, whose liberties had been eroded over time, including the right to elect kings. Hotman had asserted the right of the Estates-General to perform this function. Though Hotman was a Protestant, his argument also influenced Catholic jurists searching for a means to replace the Cardinal of Bourbon at the beginning of the 1590s and the decision to summon the Estates-General to elect a new "king".

The meeting of the Estates General that opened on 26 January 1593 proved far from representative. Many royalist delegates refused to attend, and other delegates were blocked by royalist troops from reaching Paris. By then, deep divisions in the League had become apparent. The League's leader, Charles of Lorraine, Duke of Mayenne, had repeatedly disputed the strategy of the Duke of Parma, the Governor of the Spanish Netherlands, whom Philip II sent into northern France to reinforce the League. Mayenne had also quarrelled with his nephew, Charles, Duke of Guise, whom some wanted to elect king. Finally, Mayenne was at odds with many Parisian leaders, particularly with the Sixteen, a group of city representatives who pursued their own libertarian agenda and often worked with the Spanish behind Mayenne's back.

In November 1591, when the Sixteen executed a group of moderates from the Paris parlement, Mayenne hanged or imprisoned the ringleaders. Mayenne, who nursed ambitions to be king himself, saw his grand alliance of Catholic nobles, French towns and Spain crumbling from a growing disunity of purpose and the absence of an obvious claimant to the throne.

It was widely believed among Catholics that the pope's blessing was essential to the legitimacy of a king of France because of the Protestant faith of Henry. At the time of his succession, Henry IV was under a papal excommunication, which had been imposed by Pope Sixtus V on 21 September 1585, and so the papacy considered it legitimate for Henry's subjects to oppose his rule, both as King of Navarre and, after 1589, as King of France. The persistence of rebellion and civil war in the early years of Henry's reign owed much to the papacy's refusal to accept anyone but a Catholic on the French throne.

Mayenne was opposed to the idea of summoning the Estates-General to elect a king, but in 1592, he finally caved in to Spanish pressure to do so. Mayenne opened the assembly with a symbolically empty chair beside him. The influence of Spain on the assembly soon proved problematic. Spain sought the election of the Infanta Isabella Clara Eugenia of Spain, the daughter of Philip II of Spain and Henry III's niece and would-be-heiress under male-preference primogeniture. The Spanish urged the Estates-General to repeal the Salic law, which prevented the rule of a queen regnant, but in so doing, they failed to grasp a fundamental principle of the French royal succession.

The Spanish ambassador in Paris had instructions to "insinuate cleverly" the rights of the Infanta to the French throne. His brief also stated that the Salic Law "was a pure invention [...] as the most learned and discerning of their lawyers recognise". The Estates-General of the Catholic League insisted that if Clara Isabella Eugenia were to be chosen, she should marry a French prince. Philip II, however, wanted her to marry Archduke Ernest of Austria. The Estates replied that "our laws and customs prevent us from calling forward as king any prince not of our nation". On 28 June 1593, the Paris parlement followed up by resolving "to preserve the realm which depends on God alone and recognizes no other ruler of its temporal affairs, no matter what his status, and to prevent it from being overrun by foreigners in the fair name of religion".

While the delegates of the Estates-General dithered in Paris, Henry IV dealt a well-timed blow to their deliberations by announcing his wish to be converted from Protestantism to Catholicism, a move that effectively cut the ground from under the Catholic League's feet. The Estates-General sent delegates to treat with Henry's representatives, and on 8 August, most of the members of the assembly returned home.

== Legitimisation ==
Henry IV of France touching for scrofula, in an engraving of 1609

Henry's abjuration of the Protestant faith on 25 July 1593 at the Abbey of Saint-Denis proved decisive in winning over many of his opponents. His legitimisation proceeded in stages. The archbishop of Bourges raised his excommunication, though without papal authority, during the abjuration ceremony. The following year, Henry had himself anointed and crowned at Chartres Cathedral. After the ceremony, he demonstrated his sacred powers by touching people for scrofula, the king's evil. Finally, on 12 July 1595, Pope Clement VIII agreed to lift Henry's excommunication, and he pronounced the absolution on 17 September. For the first time, he gave Henry the title of "most Christian King of France and Navarre".

When Clement absolved Henry, he, like Henry, was motivated by political pragmatism. The papacy lived in fear of further national churches breaking away from Rome, to be governed instead by princes. The Gallican church had already shown independent tendencies, and some of Henry's advisers advocated for him to declare himself the spiritual head of the French church. Also, Clement feared that, in the words of the historian J. H. Elliott, "a Spanish victory in France could mean the end of papal independence". Clement's grant of absolution, therefore, contains an element of damage limitation. For two years, Henry had been recognised by many in the French church, and French theologians at the Sorbonne had confirmed the Archbishop of Bourges's lifting of Henry's excommunication. To reassert papal jurisdiction, Clement made a point of declaring the absolution granted at Saint-Denis in 1593 to be void, but in substituting his own absolution, he ruled all Henry's acts since that date as legitimate in retrospect. Thus, the pope papered over the technical anomaly of the archbishop's abrogation of papal powers. Clement's absolution was contingent on a set of demanding conditions. Among other promises, Henry swore to establish a single religion in France, to recompense all Catholic clergy who had lost land or property to the Huguenots and to apply the decrees of the Council of Trent in France.

After 1594, Henry's recognition doomed further armed opposition to his rule within France. One by one, the leaders of the Catholic League made peace with him. Mayenne surrendered in 1596 after the Peace of Follembray, and in 1598, the surrender of the last League commander, Philippe Emmanuel, Duke of Mercœur, who had hoped to restore Brittany to independence under his own rule, was followed by the Edict of Nantes the same year. Even so, many of Henry's Catholic subjects were sceptical about his recantation. It was argued that until Henry fulfilled the daunting terms of his absolution, his conversion could not be considered sincere. Those who continued to believe that Henry was a heretic regarded him as a tyrant who had usurped the throne of France under false pretenses. One of the reasons that François Ravaillac gave for assassinating Henry IV in 1610 was the king's "refusal to exercise his power to compel the so-called reformed Church Calvinist Protestants to the apostolic Catholic and Roman Church".

== Assassination ==
Henry IV's assassination in 1610 was the last of a series of attempts on his life throughout his reign. The constant threat of assassination was related to questions of his legitimacy as King of France. Even after his abjuration of the Protestant faith in 1593, doubts remained about the sincerity of Henry's conversion. In particular were those who believed that in failing to fulfill the terms of his absolution, he remained technically excommunicated and therefore a legitimate target of assassination. As a Catholic king, Henry should have, it was argued, closed Huguenot churches and banned Protestant worship, but he instead made concessions to his former co-religionists in the Edict of Nantes and tolerated the existence of what was seen as a "state within a state", with whole towns and regions of France in which the Huguenots' right to worship, bear arms and govern their own affairs being protected by Henry.

According to his murderer, François Ravaillac, Henry "made no attempt to convert these Protestants and was said to be on the point of waging war against the Pope so as to transfer the Holy See to Paris". Ravaillac stated that "he had felt obliged to take this step because, from rumours he had heard, he felt the King had seemed reluctant to punish the Huguenots for trying to murder all the Catholics last Christmas Day. Some Catholics still languished in the Paris gaols while their persecutors went scot free".

Henry continued to promote Huguenots to office in France and to form alliances with Protestant princes abroad. In his home territory of Béarn, he did nothing to re-establish free Catholic worship, as the pope had demanded. It seemed clear to Henry's Catholic opponents that he had recanted his Protestantism merely for political reasons to secure the French throne. Rebels and would-be assassins felt justified by what they saw as Henry's manifest failure to comply with the terms of his absolution. In their view, Henry remained a heretic and thus a usurper on the throne of France.

== Genealogy ==
On the death of King Henry III of France, who had no son, the crown passed to Henry IV, in the application of Salic law, because Henry was the descendant of the eldest surviving male line of the Capetian dynasty.

=== House of Bourbon ===
Henry IV's descent in the male line from Louis IX of France.

- Henry IV was the 9th cousin of King Henry II, and the 9th cousin once removed of kings Francis II, Charles IX, and Henry III. He was the son of:
- Antoine of Navarre (1518–1562), 8th cousin of kings Charles VIII and Francis I, who was the son of:
- Charles IV, Duke of Bourbon (1489–1537), 7th cousin of kings Louis XI and Louis XII, who was the son of:
- François de Bourbon-Vendôme (1470–1495), 6th cousin of King Charles VII, who was the son of:
- Jean de Bourbon-Vendôme (1428–1477), 5th cousin of King Charles VI, who was the son of:
- Louis de Bourbon-Vendôme (1376–1446), 4th cousin of King Charles V, who was the son of:
- Jean de Bourbon-La Marche (1344–1393), 3rd cousin of kings John I Posthumous and John II, who was the son of:
- Jacques de Bourbon-La Marche (1315–1362), 2nd cousin of kings Louis X, Philip V, Charles IV, and Philip VI, who was the son of:
- Louis I, Duke of Bourbon (1279–1342), 1st cousin of King Philip IV, who was the son of:
- Robert, Count of Clermont (1256–1317), brother of King Philip III and son of:
- King Louis IX (Saint Louis) (1214/1215 - 1270)

== Simplified Bourbon family tree ==
=== From Louis IX to Charles X ===
Direct Capetians
Louis IX; King of France; 1214–1270 r. 1226–1270	Margaret of Provence; 1221–1295
House of Bourbon
Philip III; King of France; 1245–1285 r. 1270–1285	Robert; Count of Clermont; 1256–1317 r. 1268–1317	Beatrice of Burgundy; 1257–1310
House of Valois
Charles; Count of Valois; 1270–1325 r. 1284–1325	Louis I Duke of Bourbon; 1279–1341 r. 1327–1341	Mary of Avesnes; 1280–1354
Philip VI; King of France; 1293–1350 r. 1328–1350
John II; King of France; 1319–1364 r. 1350–1364	Isabella of Valois; 1313–1383	Peter I Duke of Bourbon; 1311–1356 r. 1342–1356	James I Count of La Marche; 1319–1362 r. 1356–1362	Jeanne of Châtillon; 1320-1371
Charles V King of France; 1338–1380 r. 1364–1380	Joanna of Bourbon; 1338–1378	Louis II; Duke of Bourbon; 1337–1410 r. 1356–1410	Peter II; Count of La Marche; 1342–1362 r. 1362	John I Count of La Marche; 1344–1393 r. 1362–1393	Catherine of Vendôme; 1354–1412
Charles VI; King of France; 1368–1422 r. 1380–1422	John I Duke of Bourbon; 1381–1434 r. 1410–1434	Louis I Duke of Orléans; 1372–1407 r. 1392–1407	James II; Count of La Marche; 1370–1438 r. 1393–1438	Louis; Count of Vendôme; 1376–1446 r. 1393–1446	John; Lord of Carency; 1378–1458 r. 1393–1458
Charles VII; King of France; 1403–1461 r. 1422–1461	Charles I Duke of Bourbon; 1401–1456 r. 1434–1456	Louis I Count of Montpensier; 1405–1486 r. 1428–1486	John; Count of Angoulême; 1399–1467	Eleanor of Bourbon-La Marche; 1407–aft.1464	Lords of Carency
Louis XI; King of France; 1423–1483 r. 1461–1483	Joan of France; 1435–1482	John II; Duke of Bourbon; 1426–1488 r. 1456–1488	Charles II; Duke of Bourbon; 1433–1488 r. 1488	Louis; Bishop of Liège; 1438–1482 r. 1456–1482	Gilbert; Count of Montpensier; 1443–1496 r. 1486–1496	Charles; Count of Angoulême; 1459–1496 r. 1467–1496	Dukes of Nemours	John VIII; Count of Vendôme; 1425–1477 r. 1446–1477
Anne of France; 1461–1522	Peter II; Count of La Marche; Duke of Bourbon; 1438–1503 r. 1488–1503	Peter of Bourbon-Busset; 1464–1529	Francis; Count of Vendôme; 1470–1495 r. 1477–1495	Louis; Prince of La Roche-sur-Yon; 1473–1520	Louise; Duchess of Montpensier; 1482–1561 r. 1538–1561
Suzanne; Duchess of Bourbon; 1491–1521 r. 1503–1521	Charles III; Count of La Marche; Duke of Bourbon; 1490–1527 r. 1521–1527	Philip of Bourbon-Busset; 1494–1557	Francis I King of France; 1494–1547 r. 1515–1547	Charles; Duke of Vendôme; 1489–1537 r. 1514–1537	Louis; Duke of Montpensier; 1513-1582 r. 1561–1582
Bourbon-Busset illegitimate male-line	Henry II; King of France; 1519–1559 r. 1547–1559	Jeanne III d'Albret; Queen of Navarre; 1528–1572 r. 1555–1572	Antoine; Duke of Vendôme; King of Navarre; 1518–1562 r. 1555–1562	Louis; Prince of Condé; 1530–1569 r. 1546–1569	Dukes of Montpensier
Margaret of France; 1553–1615	Henry IV of Bourbon; King of France; 1553–1610 r. 1589–1610	Marie de' Medici; 1575–1642	Henri I Prince of Condé; 1552–1588 r. 1569–1588
Louis XIII; King of France; 1601–1643 r. 1610–1643	Henri II; Prince of Condé; 1588–1646 r. 1588–1646
Louis XIV; King of France; 1638–1715 r. 1643–1715	Louis II; Grand Condé; Prince of Condé; 1621–1686 r. 1646–1686	Armand; Prince of Conti; 1629–1666 r. 1629–1666	Philippe I 1640–1701; Duke of Orléans
Henri Jules; Prince of Condé; 1643–1709 r. 1686–1709
Louis; 1661-1711 "Grand Dauphin" of France	{{{La2}}}	Louise Bénédicte de Bourbon; 1676-1753	Louis III; Prince of Condé; 1668–1710 r. 1709–1710	Louise Françoise of Bourbon; 1673–1743	Marie Thérèse de Bourbon; 1666–1732	François Louis; Grand Conti; Prince of Conti; 1664–1709 r. 1685–1709	Louis Armand I Prince of Conti; 1661–1685 r. 1666–1685	Marie Anne de Bourbon; 1666–1739
Louis; 1682–1712; Duke of Burgundy, Dauphin of France	Philip V 1683–1746; King of Naples, Sardinia, and Spain	Louis IV Henri; Prince de Condé; 1692–1740 r. 1710–1740	Marie Anne de Bourbon; 1689–1720	Louise Élisabeth de Bourbon; 1693–1775	Louis Armand II; Prince of Conti; 1695–1727 r. 1709–1727
Louis XV; King of France; 1710-1774 r. 1715–1774	Louis V Joseph; Prince of Condé; 1736–1818 r. 1740–1818	Louis François; Prince of Conti; 1717–1776 r. 1727–1776
Louis; 1729–1765; Dauphin of France	Maria Teresa of Spain; 1726–1746	Louis VI Henri; Prince of Condé; 1756–1830 r. 1818–1830	Louis François Joseph; Prince of Conti; 1734–1814 r. 1776–1814
Louis XVI; King of France; 1754–1793 r. 1774–1792	Louis XVIII; King of France; 1755–1824 r. 1815–1824	Charles X King of France; 1757–1836 r. 1824–1830	Louis Antoine; Duke of Enghien; 1772–1804

=== Descent from Henry IV ===
see also:Family tree of Spanish monarchs

Henry IV; King of France (1589–1610)
Louis XIII; King of France (1610–1643)
Louis XIV; King of France (1643–1715)	Philippe I Duke of Orléans
Louis "Le Grand Dauphin" of France	Philippe II; Duke of Orléans; Regent of France
Louis "Le Petit Dauphin" of France	Philip V King of Spain (1700–1746)	Louis; Duke of Orléans
Louis XV; King of France (1715–1774)	Louis I King of Spain (1724)	Ferdinand VI; King of Spain (1746–1759)	Charles III; King of Spain (1759–1788)	Philip; Duke of Parma (1748–1765)	Louis Philippe I Duke of Orléans
Louis; Dauphin of France	Charles IV; King of Spain (1788–1808)	Ferdinand; Duke of Parma (1765–1802)	Louis Philippe II (Philippe Égalité); Duke of Orléans
Louis XVI; King of France (1774–1791); King of the French (1791–1792); Titular King of France (1792–1793)	Louis XVIII; Titular King of France (1795–1804); Legitimist pretender (1804–1814); King of France (1814–1824)	Charles X King of France (1824–1830); Legitimist pretender (1830–1836)	Ferdinand VII; King of Spain (1808; 1813–1833)	Francisco de Paula	Carlos; Count of Molina Carlos V Carlist pretender (1833–1845)	Louis I King of Etruria (1801–1803)	Louis Philippe I King of the French (1830–1848); Orléanist pretender (1848–1850)
Louis; Dauphin of France as Louis XVII; Titular King of France (1793–1795)	Louis-Antoine; Duke of Angoulême Dauphin of France as Louis XIX; Legitimist pretender (1836–1844)	Charles Ferdinand; Duke of Berry	Isabella II; Queen of Spain (1833–1868)	Francis; Duke of Cádiz; King consort of Spain	Carlos; Count of Montemolin Carlos VI; Carlist pretender (1845–1861)	Juan; Count of Montizón Juan III; Carlist pretender (1861–1868) as Jean III; Legitimist pretender (1883–1887)	Louis II; King of Etruria (1803–1807) Charles I Duke of Lucca (1824–1847) Charles II; Duke of Parma (1847–1849)	Ferdinand Philippe; Duke of Orléans
Henri; Count of Chambord as Henri V Legitimist pretender (1844–1883)	Alfonso XII; King of Spain (1874–1885)	Carlos; Duke of Madrid Carlos VII; Carlist pretender (1868–1909) as Charles XI; Legitimist pretender (1887–1909)	Alfonso Carlos; Duke of San Jaime Alfonso Carlos I Carlist pretender (1931–1936) as Charles XII; Legitimist pretender (1931–1936)	Charles III; Duke of Parma (1849–1854)	Philippe; Count of Paris as Philippe VII; Orléanist pretender (1850–1894)	Robert; Duke of Chartres
Alfonso XIII; King of Spain (1886–1931) as Alphonse I Legitimist pretender (1936–1941)	Jaime; Duke of Madrid Jaime III; Carlist pretender (1909–1931) as Jacques I Legitimist pretender (1909–1931)	Robert I Duke of Parma (1854–1859)	Philippe; Duke of Orléans as Philippe VIII; Orléanist pretender (1894–1926)	Jean; Duke of Guise as Jean III; Orléanist pretender (1926–1940)
Jaime; Duke of Segovia Jaime IV; Carlist pretender (1941–1969) as Jacques II or Henri VI; Legitimist pretender (1941–1975)	Juan; Count of Barcelona	Xavier; Duke of Parma; Carlist regent (1936–1952) Javier I Carlist pretender (1952–1977)	Felix; Prince of Luxembourg	Henri; Count of Paris as Henri VI; Orléanist pretender (1940–1999)
Alfonso; Duke of Anjou and Cádiz as Alphonse II; Legitimist pretender (1975–1989)	Juan Carlos I King of Spain (1975–2014)	Carlos Hugo; Duke of Parma Carlos Hugo I Carlist pretender (1977–1979)	Sixtus Henry; Prince of Parma Enrique V Carlist pretender (1979–present)	Jean; Grand Duke of Luxembourg (1964–2000)	Henri; Count of Paris; Duke of France as Henri VII; Orléanist pretender (1999–2019)
Louis; Duke of Anjou as Louis XX; Legitimist pretender (1989–present)	Felipe VI; King of Spain (2014–present)	Carlos; Duke of Parma Carlos Xavier II; Carlist pretender (2011–present)	Henri; Grand Duke of Luxembourg (2000–2025)	Jean; Count of Paris as Jean IV; Orléanist pretender (2019–present)
Louis; Duke of Burgundy; Dauphin of France	Leonor; Princess of Asturias	Carlos; Prince of Piacenza	Guillaume V Grand Duke of Luxembourg (2025–present)	Gaston; Count of Clermont

=== Ancestors ===
Ancestors of Henry IV of France on both sides

16. Jean VIII de Bourbon, Count of Vendôme
8. François de Bourbon, Count of Vendôme
17. Isabelle de Beauveau
4. Charles de Bourbon, Duke of Vendôme
18. Pierre de Luxembourg, Count of Saint Pol
9. Marie de Luxembourg
19. Margaret of Savoy
2. Antoine de Bourbon, Duke of Vendôme
20. John II of Alençon
10. René of Alençon
21. Marie of Armagnac
5. Françoise of Alençon
22. Frederick II, Count of Vaudémont
11. Margaret of Lorraine
23. Yolande d'Anjou
1. Henry IV of France
24. Alain I d'Albret
12. John III of Navarre
25. Françoise of Châtillon-Limoges
6. Henry II of Navarre
26. Gaston of Foix, Prince of Viana
13. Catherine of Navarre
27. Magdalena of Valois
3. Jeanne d'Albret, Queen of Navarre
28. John, Count of Angoulême
14. Charles, Count of Angoulême
29. Marguerite de Rohan
7. Marguerite d'Angoulême
30. Philip II, Duke of Savoy
15. Louise of Savoy
31. Margaret of Bourbon

== Bibliography ==
- Baumgartner, Frederic J. France in the Sixteenth Century. London: Macmillan, 1995. ISBN 0-333-62088-7.
- Briggs, Robin. Early Modern France, 1560–1715. Oxford: Oxford University Press, 1977. ISBN 0-19-289040-9.
- Bryson, David M. Queen Jeanne and the Promised Land: Dynasty, Homeland, Religion and Violence in Sixteenth-century France. Leiden and Boston, Massachusetts: Brill Publishers, 1999. ISBN 90-04-11378-9.
- Buisseret, David. Henry IV, King of France. New York: Routledge, 1990. ISBN 0-04-445635-2.
- Cameron, Keith, ed. From Valois to Bourbon: Dynasty, State & Society in Early Modern France. Exeter: University of Exeter Press, 1989. ISBN 0-85989-310-3.
- Finley-Croswhite, S. Annette. Henry IV and the Towns: The Pursuit of Legitimacy in French Urban Society, 1589–1610. Cambridge: Cambridge University Press, 1999. ISBN 0-521-62017-1.196
- Frieda, Leonie. Catherine de Medici. London: Phoenix, 2005. ISBN 0-7538-2039-0.
- Greengrass, Mark. France in the Age of Henri IV: The Struggle for Stability. London: Longman, 1984. ISBN 0-582-49251-3.
- Holt, Mack P. The French Wars of Religion, 1562–1629. Cambridge: Cambridge University Press, 2005. ISBN 978-0-521-54750-5.
- Knecht, R. J. Catherine de' Medici. London and New York: Longman, 1998. ISBN 0-582-08241-2.
- Knecht, R. J. The French Religious Wars, 1562–1598. Oxford: Osprey, 2002. ISBN 1-84176-395-0.
- Knecht, R. J. The Rise and Fall of Renaissance France, 1483–1610. Oxford: Blackwell, 2001. ISBN 0-631-22729-6.
- Lee, Maurice J. James I & Henri IV: An Essay in English Foreign Policy, 1603–1610. Urbana: University of Illinois Press, 1970. ISBN 0-252-00084-6.
- LLoyd, Howell A. The State, France, and the Sixteenth Century. London: Allen & Unwin, 1983. ISBN 0-04-940066-5.
- Lockyer, Roger. Habsburg and Bourbon Europe, 1470–1720. Harlow, UK: Longman, 1974. ISBN 0-582-35029-8.
- Major, J. Russell. From Renaissance Monarchy to Absolute Monarchy: French Kings, Nobles & Estates. Baltimore: Johns Hopkins University Press, 1997. ISBN 0-8018-5631-0.
- Moote, A. Lloyd. Louis XIII, the Just. Berkeley: University of California Press, 1991. ISBN 0-520-07546-3.
- Mousnier, Roland. The Assassination of Henry IV: The Tyrannicide Problem and the Consolidation of the French Absolute Monarchy in the Early Seventeenth Century. Translated by Joan Spencer. London: Faber and Faber, 1973. ISBN 0-684-13357-1.
- Pettegree, Andrew. Europe in the Sixteenth Century. Oxford: Blackwell, 2002. ISBN 0-631-20704-X.
- Salmon, J. H. M. Society in Crisis: France in the Sixteenth Century. London: Ernest Benn, 1975. ISBN 0-510-26351-8.
- Sutherland, N. M. Henry IV of France and the Politics of Religion, 1572–1596. 2 vols. Bristol: Elm Bank, 2002. ISBN 1-84150-846-2.
- Sutherland, N. M. The Huguenot Struggle for Recognition. New Haven: Yale University Press, 1980. ISBN 0-300-02328-6.
- Sutherland, N. M. The Massacre of St Bartholomew and the European Conflict, 1559–1572. London: Macmillan, 1973. ISBN 0-333-13629-2.
- Sutherland, N. M. Princes, Politics and Religion, 1547–1589. London: Hambledon Press, 1984. ISBN 0-907628-44-3.
