= List of lords and princes of Carency =

The lordship of Carency belonged to a cadet branch of the House of Bourbon. From the 15th century onwards they were known as princes of Carency, even if their fiefdom does not seem to have been promoted to a princedom. In the 16th century Carency passed to the Escars via the female line.

== Origins (13th and 14th centuries) ==
- Catherine de Condé, lady of Carency, Buquoy and Aubigny. She married Jacques de Châtillon (†1302) Lord of Leuze, younger son of Guy de Châtillon (†1289), count of Saint-Pol, by whom she had :
- Hugues de Châtillon (†1329), lord of de Condé, Carency, Buquoy, Aubigny and Leuze. He married Jeanne, Lady of Argies and lady of Cathen, by whom he had :
- Jeanne de Châtillon (1320-†1371), Lady of Condé, Carency, Aubigny and Leuze. In 1335 she married James I, Count of La Marche (†1362), by whom she had :
- John I (1344-†1393), Count of La Marche, Vendôme and Castres.

== House of Bourbon-Carency (14th–16th centuries) ==
- John of Bourbon (1378–1457)

Lord of Carency-en-Artois and of Aubigny-en-Artois

He was the third son of John I, Count of La Marche, and of Catherine of Vendôme.

In 1416 he married Catherine of Artois (†1420), second daughter of Philip of Artois, count of Eu and of Marie of Berry.
In 1420 he married Jeanne of Vendômois, daughter of Hamelin of Vendômois and of Alix de Bessé, with whom he had :

1. Louis of Bourbon (1417-†1453), knight, lord of the towns and lands of Lécluse, Carency, Aubigny, Aix, Duisans, Buquoy, Combles...;
2. John (1418-†1458)
3. Jeanne (1419-†1443)
4. Catherine (1421–?)
5. Pierre de Bourbon (1424-†1481)), lord of Carency, lord of the lands and seigneuries of Duisans, in 1450 married Philippotte de Plaine;
6. Jacques de Bourbon (1425-†>1493) see below;
7. Eléonore (1426–?)
8. Andriette (1427–?)
9. Philippe de Bourbon (1429–?), lord of Duisans, married Catherine de Lalaing (†1478), daughter of Sance de Lalaing, lord of Opprebais, grand bailiff of Le Cambrésis, and of Catherine de Robersart, lady of Écaillon and of Bruille.

9.1 Antoine de Bourbon, lord of Duisans, married Jeanne de Habarcq, daughter of Pierre de Habarcq, lord of Gournay, and of Marie de Ranchicourt;

9.1.1 Pierre de Bourbon, died in infancy;
9.1.2 Philippe de Bourbon who took the side of Charles III, Duke of Bourbon;
9.1.3 Jeanne de Bourbon, married by contract at Moulins on 20 January 1489, François Rolin, lord of Beauchamp and of Monetay;
9.1.4 Jeanne de Bourbon, died aged 14 and buried at Tours;
9.1.5 Eléonore de Bourbon, died and buried at Tours;
9.1.6 Andriette de Bourbon, died and buried at Tours .

- Jacques de Bourbon (1425-†>1493))

Lord of Carency, Aubigny, Rochefort, Buquoy, Lécluse.

He was Lieutenant Général of John II, Duke of Bourbon on his lands, by letters patent given at Moulins on 28 February 1486. Louis XI granted him the goods confiscated from Peter of Bourbon by letters of 20 April 1469. He was still living in 1493.

In 1442 he married Antoinette de la Tour, widow of Jacques Aubert, lord of Marteil and daughter of Annet II de la Tour, lord of Olliergues and of Elips de Vendat, with whom he had :

1. Charles (1444–?) see below
2. Jean de Bourbon (1446–?), lord of Rochefort, d’Arson, married Jeanne de l’Isle, widow of Arnoul, lord of la Hanaide and Condé, only daughter of Jacques de l’Isle, lord of Frêne and of Catherine de Neusville, without posterity.

- Charles de Bourbon (1444–?)

"Prince" of Carency, lord of Aubigny, Rochefort, Buquoy, Lécluse, Bougny, Combles, Abret, Vendat, Bains, Saint-Georges and Ternat, Count of La Marche.

On 15 January 1468 he married Didière of Vergy, only daughter and heir of Jean of Vergy, lord of Fouvens and Vinory and of Marguerite de la Rocheguyon, no issue.

On 8 November 1481, he married Antoinette de Chabannes (†1490), daughter of Geoffroy de Chabannes, knight, lord of Charlus and of Charlotte de Prie, no issue.

On 18 April 1493, he married Catherine d’Alègre, daughter of Bertrand d’Alègre, baron of Puysaguet, lord of Busset, baron of Puysaguet, Le Temple and Saint-Priest, and of Isabelle de Levy-Cousan, by whom he had :

1. Bertrand de Bourbon (1494-†1515)), died in the battle of Marignan in 1515, no issue.
2. Jean de Bourbon (1500-†1520), died at Moulins, no issue.
3. Louise de Bourbon, dame de Combles, Buquoy and Vendat.
4. Isabelle de Bourbon see below

- Isabelle de Bourbon

Princess of Carency, Aubigny, Combles and Buquoy.

On 22 February 1516 she married François de Peyrusse d'Escars (or des Cars) (†1550), lord of La Vauguyon, councillor, chamberlain, gentleman of the king's chamber to Francis I, with whom she had :

1. Jean d’Escars (†1595) see below
2. Susanne, in 1536 married Geoffroy de Pompadour
3. Anne, married Jean II de La Queille baron de Fleurat
4. Marguerite (†1589) abbess of Ligueux
5. Catherine

== House of Escars (16th century) ==
- Jean de Peyrusse d’Escars (†1595)

"Prince" of Carency, then in 1586 count of La Vauguyon, lord of Abret and Vendat. Knight of the Ordre du Saint-Esprit from 1578.

In 1561 he married Anne de Clermont, daughter of Antoine III count of Clermont, son of Bernardin de Clermont, with whom he had :

1. Claude d’Escars (†6 March 1586), prince of Carency, killed in a duel by Gontaut Biron (beheaded on the orders of Henri IV).
2. Henri d’Escars (†1590), prince of Carency, married Anne marquise of Fronsac, daughter of Geoffroy lord of Caumont.
3. Diane d’Escars : see below
4. Louise (1576-†1583), abbess of Ligueux
5. Isabeau d'Escars (†1609), lady of Combles, married Jean of Amanzé on 10 September 1595.

- Diane d’Escars

Princess of Carency, countess of La Vauguyon and lady of Abret after her brothers' deaths.

In 1573 she married Charles Gouyon, count of la Maure, thus moving Carency into the Rochechouart family, who did not use the title. This family was not linked to Carency's promotion to a princedom. Diane and her husband were great grand parents of Madame de Montespan.

She later married Louis Estuer comte de Saint-Megrin, by whom she had :

1. Jacques (1588-†1671) count of La Vauguyon

At the end of the 18th century, the title passed to Alphonse de Bauffremont, a member of the House of Bauffremont, via the marriage of one of the daughters of Paul François de Quelen de La Vauguyon.
