= Anne de Bourbon =

Daughter of John I, Count of La Marche (1380–1408)

Anne
- Countess of Montpensier
- Tenure: 1390-1397
- Born: 1380
- Died: September 1408 (aged 27-28); Paris, France
- Buried: Église des Jacobins, Paris, France
- Noble family: House of Bourbon
- Spouses: John de Valois, Count of Montpensier; Louis VII, Duke of Bavaria
- Issue: Louis VIII, Duke of Bavaria
- Father: John I, Count of La Marche
- Mother: Catherine of Vendôme

Anne de Bourbon (1380 – September 1408) was a daughter of John I, Count of La Marche and his wife Catherine of Vendôme. She was a member of the House of Bourbon.

== Family ==
Anne was one of the seven children of John I, Count of La Marche and Catherine de Vendôme. Included among her siblings were James II, Count of La Marche, Louis, Count of Vendôme, and Queen Charlotte of Cyprus. Through her sister, Anne was the aunt of John II of Cyprus and Anne, Duchess of Savoy. She also had an illegitimate half-brother by her father's relationship with a mistress.

Anne's paternal grandparents were James I, Count of La Marche and Jeanne de Châtillon. Her maternal grandparents were Jean VI, Count of Vendôme and Jeanne of Ponthieu.

== First marriage ==
In 1390, Anne became the second wife of John de Valois, Count of Montpensier, a grandson of John II of France. His first wife Catherine of Valois had died at the age of 10, so John was in need of an heir. Like his first marriage however, Anne and John produced no surviving children. He died in 1397, freeing Anne for a second marriage.

== Second marriage ==
On 1 October 1402, in Paris, Anne remarried to Louis of Bavaria, the brother of Queen Isabeau of France. He succeeded his father as Duke of Bavaria in 1413, after Anne's death. They had one surviving son:

- Louis VIII, Duke of Bavaria (1 September 1403 – 7 April 1445)

Anne died in September, 1408 and was buried in the now-demolished church of the Couvent des Jacobins in Paris. Louis would remarry to Catherine of Alençon in 1413.

== Sources ==
- Adams, Tracy (2010). The Life and Afterlife of Isabeau of Bavaria. JHU Press. ISBN 978-0-8018-9926-3.
- Lehoux, Francoise (1966). Jean de France, due de Berri: sa vie, son action politique (1340-1416) (in French). Vol. 2. Picard.
