= Agnez-lès-Duisans =

- Commune
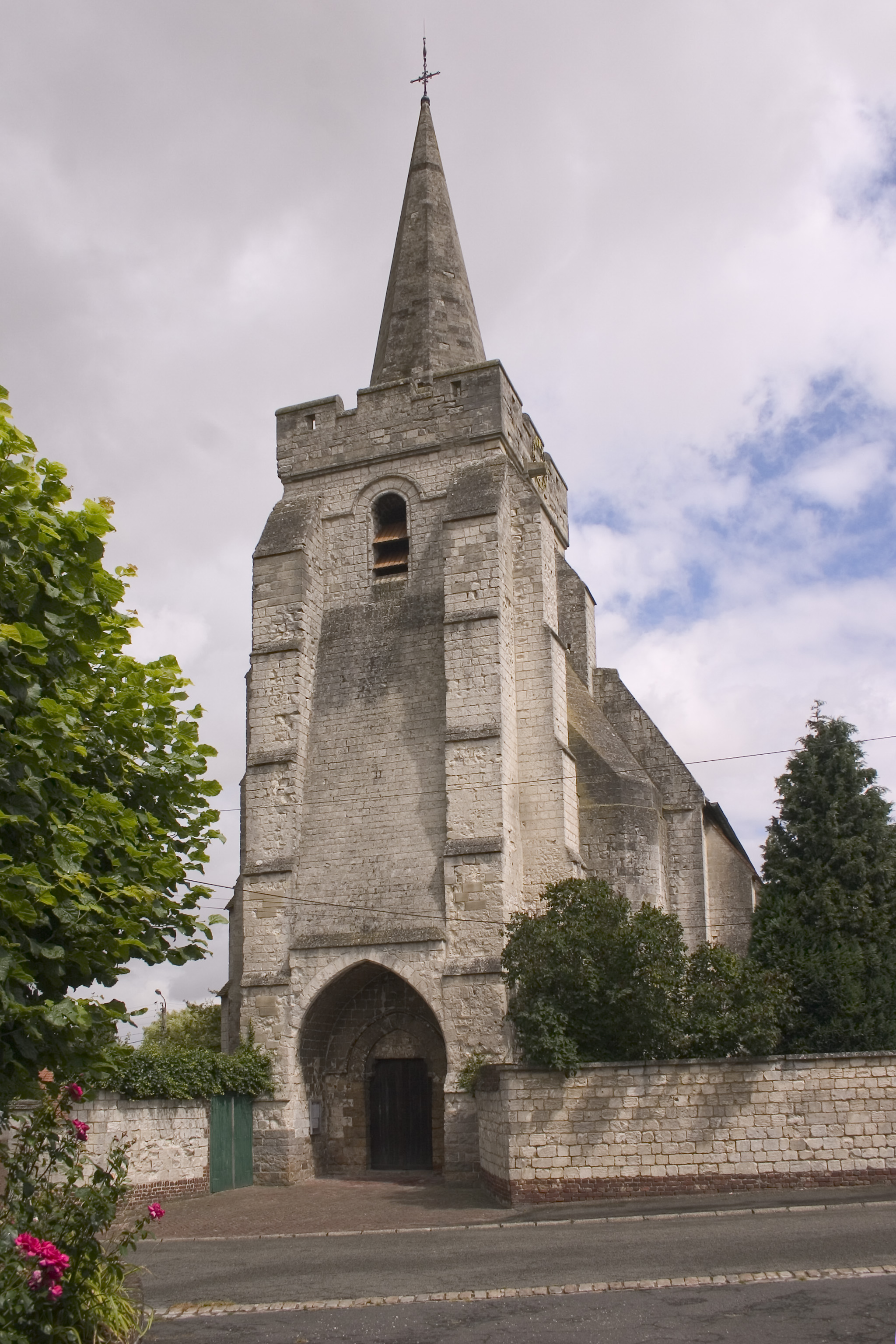
- The church of Agnez-lès-Duisans

- Coat of arms
- Location of Agnez-lès-Duisans
- Location within France Location within Hauts-de-France
- Coordinates: 50°18′30″N 2°39′36″E
- Country: France
- Region: Hauts-de-France
- Department: Pas-de-Calais
- Arrondissement: Arras
- Canton: Avesnes-le-Comte
- Intercommunality: Campagnes de l'Artois

Government
  - Mayor (2020–2026): Pascal Coin
- Area^{1}: 7.3 km^{2} (2.8 sq mi)
- Elevation: 70 m (230 ft)
- Highest elevation: 111 m (364 ft)
- Lowest elevation: 67 m (220 ft)
- Population (2023): 621
  - Density: 85/km^{2} (220/sq mi)
- Time zone: UTC+01:00 (CET)
  - Summer (DST): UTC+02:00 (CEST)
- INSEE/Postal code: 62011 /62161
- ^{1} French Land Register data, which excludes lakes, ponds, glaciers > 1 km^{2} (0.386 sq mi or 247 acres) and river estuaries.

Agnez-lès-Duisans (literally "Agnez near Duisans") is a commune in the Pas-de-Calais department in northern France.

== Geography ==
A farming village located 4 miles (6 km) west of Arras, at the D62 and D56 road junction.

== Population ==
Historical population
Year	Pop.	±% p.a.
1968	397	—
1975	415	+0.64%
1982	507	+2.90%
1990	561	+1.27%
1999	650	+1.65%
2007	677	+0.51%
2012	648	−0.87%
2017	653	+0.15%
2023	621	−0.83%
Source: INSEE

== Sights ==
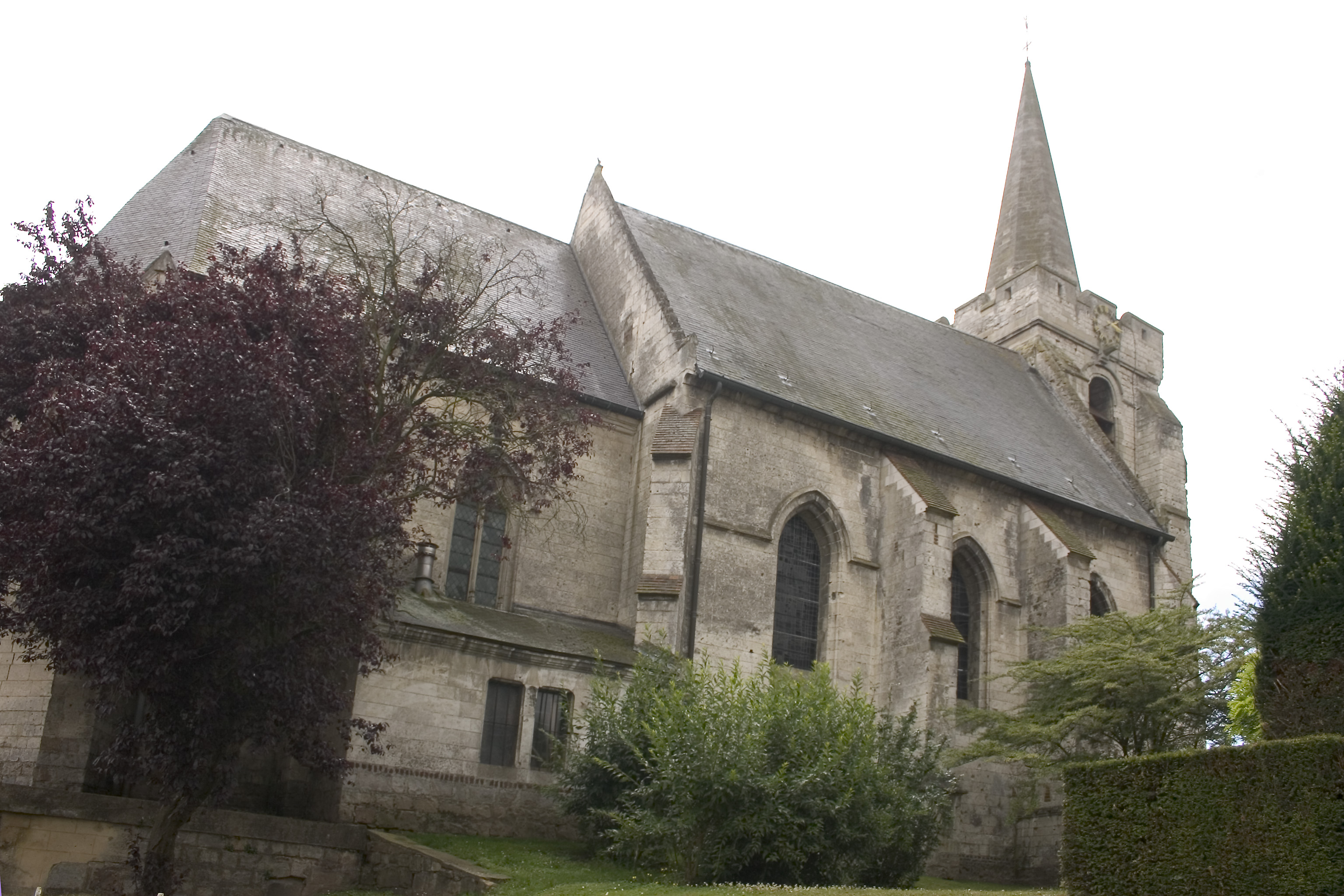
- The church of St.Martin, dating from the fifteenth century.
- The remains of an old castle.
- Two 18th-century farm buildings.

== See also ==
Communes of the Pas-de-Calais department
