= Joanna of Castile (disambiguation) =

Joanna of Castile was the monarch of Spain from 1516 until 1555.

Joanna of Castile, and variations Joan of Castile or Juana of Castile, may also refer to:

- Joan, Countess of Ponthieu (died 1279), queen consort of Castile
- Juana Manuel (died 1381), queen consort of Castile
- Joan of Portugal (died 1475), queen consort of Castile
- Joanna la Beltraneja (died 1530), infanta of Castile
- Joan of Ponthieu, Dame of Epernon (before 1336–1376)
