= John, Lord of Carency =

Son of John I, Count of La Marche

The coat of arms of Jean de Bourbon, Lord of Carency.

Jean de Bourbon, Lord of Carency (1378–1457), was a French prince du sang from the House of Bourbon-La Marche, a cadet branch of the House of Bourbon (itself a cadet branch of the Capetian dynasty). He was the youngest son of John I, Count of La Marche and Catherine of Vendôme.

== Family life ==
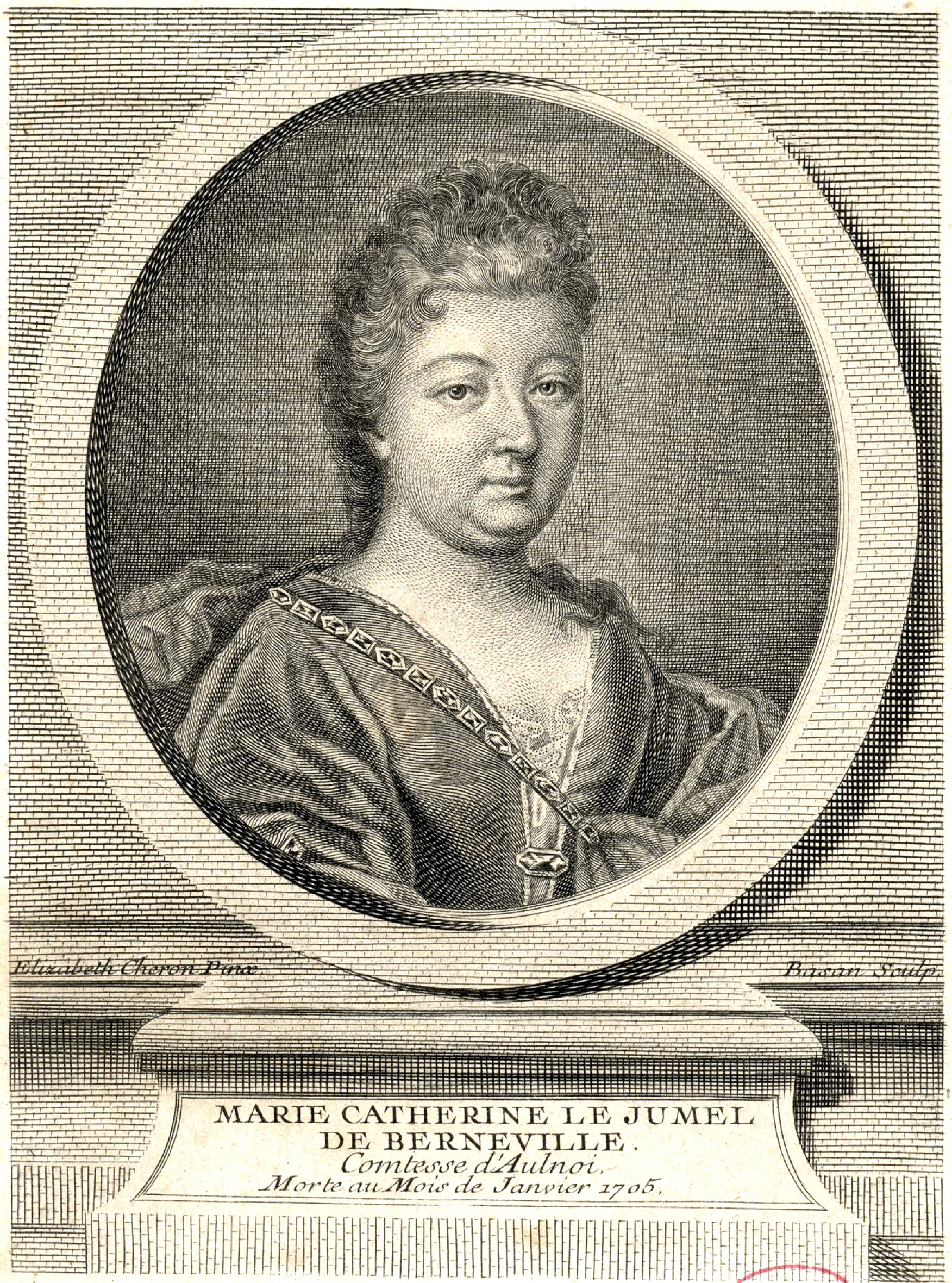
Madame d'Aulnoy.

Jean first married Catherine of Artois, the second daughter of Philip of Artois, the Count of Eu, and Marie of Berry. Jean and Catherine had no children, and after Catherine's death in 1420, Jean married his mistress Jeanne of Vendômois, the daughter of Hamelin of Vendômois and Alix of Bessé, on September 3 of the very same year at Le Mans.

John and Jeanne had:

- Pierre de Bourbon, Succeeded his father Jean as Lord of Carency
- Jacques de Bourbon, Succeeded his elder brother Pierre as Lord of Carency
- Philippe de Bourbon, Lord of Duisant
- Eleonore de Bourbon-Carency, died young at Tours
- Andriette de Bourbon-Carency

Jean and Jeanne's children recognized as legitimate was a huge struggle and was only achieved in 1438 through a papal bull by Pope Eugene IV.

Madame d'Aulnoy wrote a book about him in 1692, over two centuries after his death.

== Sources ==
- Barbier, Jean Paul (2002). Ma Bibliotheque Poetique (in French). Vol. 3–4. Librairie Droz. ISBN 2-600-00606-0.
- Deck, Suzanne (1924). Bibliothèque de l'École des hautes études: Sciences historiques et philologiques (in French). Librairie Ancienne Edouard Champion.
