= Catherine, Countess of Vendôme =

French countess of Vendôme (1354–1412)

Catherine of Vendôme
- Countess of la Marche
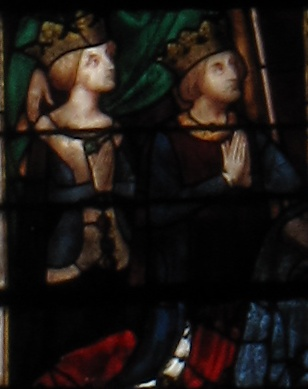
- Catherine and John I
- Born: 1354
- Died: 1412 (aged 57–58)
- Noble family: House of Montoire
- Spouse: John I, Count of La Marche
- Issue: James II, Count of La Marche; Isabelle of La Marche; Louis, Count of Vendôme; John, Lord of Carency; Anne, Countess of Montpensier; Marie, Lady of Croix; Charlotte, Queen of Cyprus
- Father: John VI of Vendôme
- Mother: Jeanne of Ponthieu

Catherine de Vendôme (1354 – 1 April 1412) was a ruling Countess of Vendôme and Castres from 1372 until 1403.

== Life ==
Catherine was the daughter of John VI of Vendôme and Jeanne of Ponthieu. She married John I, Count of La Marche, in 1364.

In 1372 inherited Vendôme on the death of her niece Jeanne and administered it jointly with her husband, then (after his death) with her second son Louis until 1403.

== Issue ==
Catherine and John had:

- James II, Count of La Marche and Castres (1370–1438)
- Isabelle (born 1373), a nun at Poissy
- Louis, Count of Vendôme (1376–1446)
- John, Lord of Carency (1378–1457), married c. 1416 Catherine, daughter of Philip of Artois, Count of Eu, without issue, married in 1420 at Le Mans, his mistress Jeanne de Vendômois, with whom he had issue
- Anne (c. 1380 – September 1408, Paris), married in 1401 John of Berry, Count of Montpensier (d. 1401), married in Paris in 1402 Louis VII, Duke of Bavaria
- Marie (1386 – aft. 11 September 1463), Lady of Brehencourt, married Jean de Baynes, Lord of Croix
- Charlotte (1388 – 15 January 1422), married in 1411 at Nicosia King Janus of Cyprus

== Sources ==
- Barbier, Jean Paul (2002). Ma Bibliotheque Poetique (in French). Vol. 3–4. Librairie Droz. ISBN 2-600-00606-0.
- Richards, Earl Jeffrey (2007). "Political Thought as Improvisation: Female Regency and Mariology in Late Medieval French Thought". In Broad, Jacqueline; Green, Karen (eds.). Virtue, liberty, and toleration: political ideas of European women, 1400-1800. Springer. p. 1-22.
- Müller, Annalena (2021). From the Cloister to the State: Fontevraud and the Making of Bourbon France. Routledge.
- de Salazar y Acha, Jaime (2006). Manual de genealogía española (in Spanish). Instituto Salazar y Castro.
