= John VI of Vendôme =

Count of Vendome

- Died: 1365
- Noble family: House of Montoire
- Spouse: Jeanne de Ponthieu
- Issue: Bouchard VII, Count of Vendôme; Catherine of Vendôme
- Father: Bouchard VI
- Mother: Alix de Bretagne

John VI de Vendôme (died 1365), Count of Vendôme and Castres (1354–1365) was a member of the House of Montoire and was the son of Bouchard VI (1290–1354) and Alix de Bretagne (1297–1377).

He lived mostly in Castres and fought at Poitiers (1356) where he was captured. In 1362, a troop of Gascon and English took the city and imprisoned Countess Jeanne de Ponthieu. Several attempts to deliver the city by force failed, and John VI had to be resolved to pay a ransom for the city.

In 1342, he married Jeanne de Ponthieu, they had two children:

- Bouchard VII, Count of Vendôme
- Catherine of Vendôme
