= Joan of Ponthieu, Dame of Epernon =

French countess (before 1336–1376)

Joan of Ponthieu
- suo jure Dame d'Épernon; Countess of Vendôme and of Castres
- Born: before 1336; France
- Died: 30 May 1376
- Noble family: Ivrea
- Spouse: Jean VI de Vendôme, Count of Vendôme and of Castres
- Issue: Bouchard VII de Vendôme, Count of Vendôme and of Castres; Catherine de Vendôme
- Father: Jean II de Ponthieu, Count of Aumale
- Mother: Catherine d'Artois

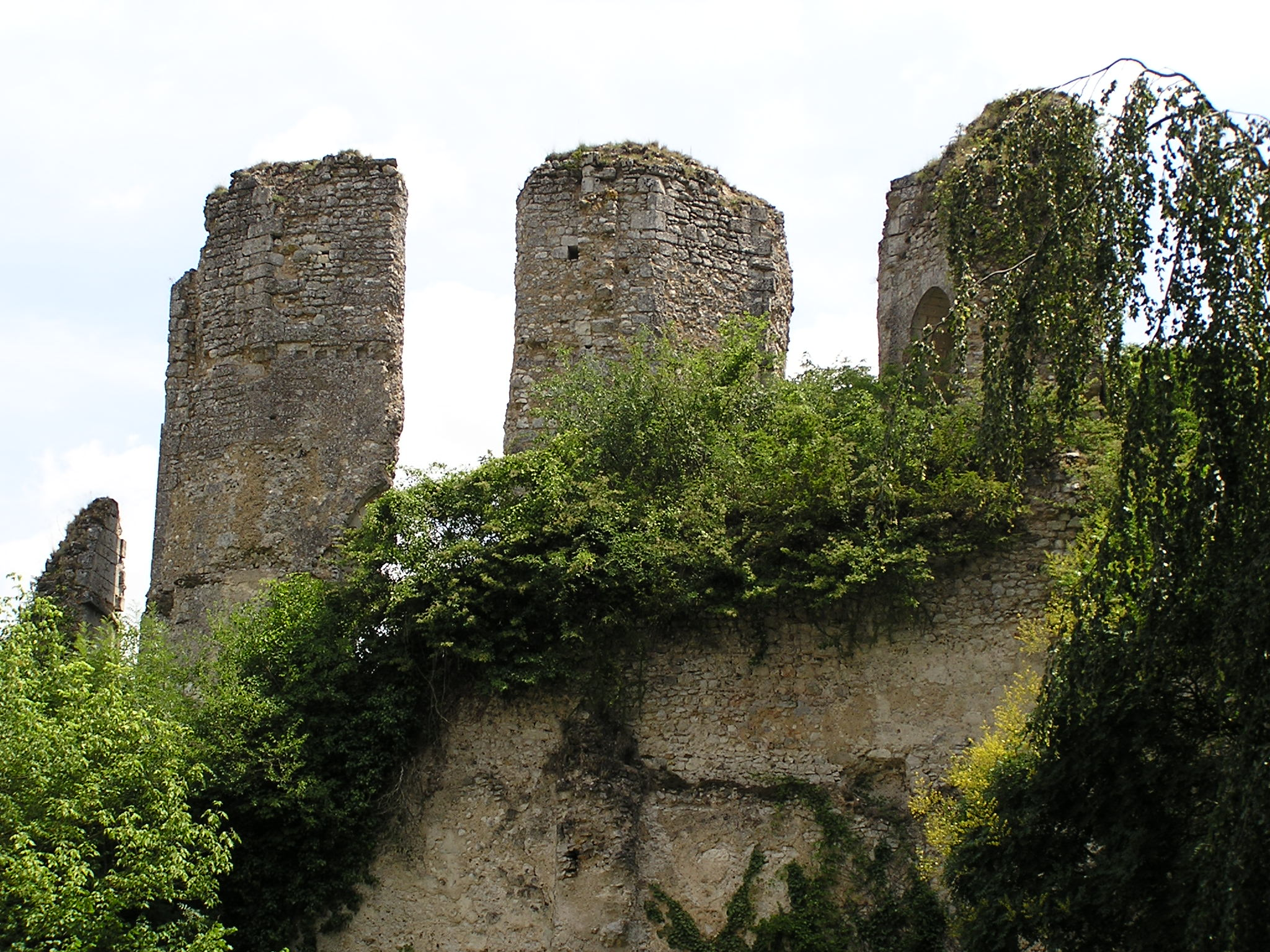
The ruins of the medieval castle of Vendôme, home of the Counts of Vendôme

Jeanne de Ponthieu, dame d'Épernon, Countess of Vendôme and of Castres, (Jeanne de Ponthieu, dame d'Épernon, comtesse de Vendôme et de Castres, before 1336 – 30 May 1376) better known in English as Joan of Ponthieu, was a French vassal; she was Dame d'Épernon suo jure by inheritance from 1343 to 1376. She was the youngest daughter of Jean II de Ponthieu, Count of Aumale. She was Countess of Vendôme and of Castres as the wife of Jean VI de Vendôme, Count of Vendôme and of Castres. She acted as regent for her infant granddaughter Jeanne, suo jure Countess of Vendôme from 1371 until the child's premature death in 1372.

== Early life ==
Joan was born in France sometime before 1336, the youngest daughter of Jean II de Ponthieu, Count of Aumale (died 1343), and Catherine d'Artois (1296 – November 1368). Joan was a direct descendant of King Ferdinand III of Castile by his second wife Joan, Countess of Ponthieu. King Louis VIII of France and Blanche of Castile were also among her many royal ancestors.

She had an elder sister, Blanche de Ponthieu (before 1326 – 12 April/May 1387) who became suo jure Countess of Aumale on 16 January 1340 upon the death of their father. Joan inherited the title and realm Dame d'Épernon after her father in 1343. The seigneury of Épernon was part of her father's inheritance which came into his family about 1256 upon the marriage of his grandmother Laure de Montfort, Dame d'Épernon to the Infante Ferdinand of Castile, Count of Aumale.

== Countess regent ==
On an unknown date sometime before 1351, Joan married Jean VI de Vendôme, Count of Vendôme and of Castres, Seigneur de Lézingnan-en-Narbonnois, and de Brétencourt of the House of Montoire. He was the son of Bouchard VI de Vendôme, Count of Vendôme and Alix de Bretagne. He succeeded to his titles in 1354; from that time onward, Joan was styled as Countess of Vendôme and of Castres.

In 1362, the castle and town of Vendôme were plundered by the Anglo-Gascon troops of Captain Robert Marcault, and Joan was taken prisoner. She was later ransomed. In 1367, she ordered that the walls of the castle were to be strengthened, and personally superintended the fortifications.

Upon the death of her husband in February 1364 at Montpellier, Joan's son Bouchard became Count of Vendôme and of Castres. When he died in 1371, the titles passed to his infant daughter, Jeanne. Joan de Ponthieu acted as regent for her granddaughter from 1371 until the latter's death in 1372.

Joan died on 30 May 1376 at about the age of 40. The titles were inherited by Catherine, the only surviving child of Joan of Ponthieu. Catherine held the titles jointly with her husband until 1393, then with her second eldest son Louis, Count of Vendôme.

== Issue ==
Joan married Jean VI de Vendôme, Count of Vendôme and of Castres. Jean and Joan together had:

- Bouchard VII de Vendôme, Count of Vendôme and Castres (c. 1351 – 16 November 1371), married, in 1368, Isabelle de Bourbon, by whom he had one daughter, Joan, Countess of Vendôme and of Castres who died in 1372.
- Catherine de Vendôme (1354 – 1 April 1412), suo jure Countess of Vendôme and of Castres. On 28 September 1364 in Paris, she married John I, Count of La Marche

== Sources ==
- de Salazar y Acha, Jaime (2006). Manual de genealogía española (in Spanish). Instituto Salaza y Castro.
