= Aubigny-en-Artois =

- Commune
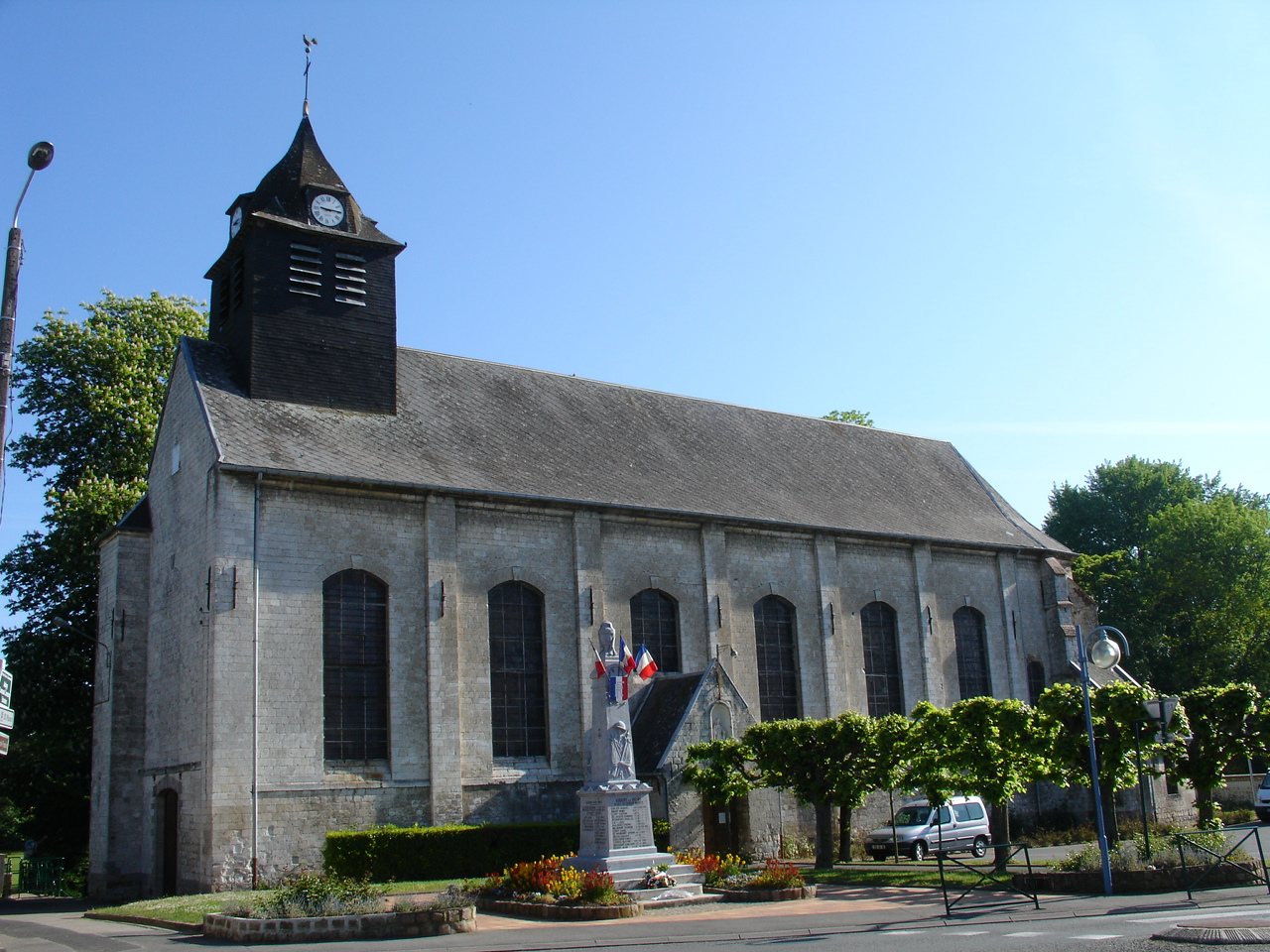
- The church of Aubigny-en-Artois

- Coat of arms
- Location of Aubigny-en-Artois
- Location within France Location within Hauts-de-France
- Coordinates: 50°21′06″N 2°35′29″E
- Country: France
- Region: Hauts-de-France
- Department: Pas-de-Calais
- Arrondissement: Arras
- Canton: Avesnes-le-Comte
- Intercommunality: CC Campagnes de l'Artois

Government
  - Mayor (2020–2026): Jean-Michel Desailly
- Area^{1}: 6.27 km^{2} (2.42 sq mi)
- Highest elevation: 144 m (472 ft)
- Lowest elevation: 87 m (285 ft)
- Population (2023): 1,489
  - Density: 237/km^{2} (615/sq mi)
- Time zone: UTC+01:00 (CET)
  - Summer (DST): UTC+02:00 (CEST)
- INSEE/Postal code: 62045 /62690
- ^{1} French Land Register data, which excludes lakes, ponds, glaciers > 1 km^{2} (0.386 sq mi or 247 acres) and river estuaries.

Aubigny-en-Artois (French pronunciation: [obiɲi ɑ̃n‿aʁtwɑ]; literally "Aubigny in Artois") is a commune in the Pas-de-Calais department in northern France.

== Geography ==
The town is located 8 miles (13 km) northwest of Arras at the junction of the D73, D74, D75 and D49 roads, just by the N39 Arras-Le Touquet road.

== Population ==
Historical population
Year	Pop.	±% p.a.
1968	1,131	—
1975	1,161	+0.37%
1982	1,330	+1.96%
1990	1,361	+0.29%
1999	1,360	−0.01%
2007	1,306	−0.51%
2012	1,367	+0.92%
2017	1,459	+1.31%
2023	1,489	+0.34%
Source: INSEE

== Sights ==
- The church of St. Kilien, dating from the eighteenth century
- The World War I cemetery
- The World War II memorial

== See also ==
- Communes of the Pas-de-Calais department
