= Lécluse =

- Commune
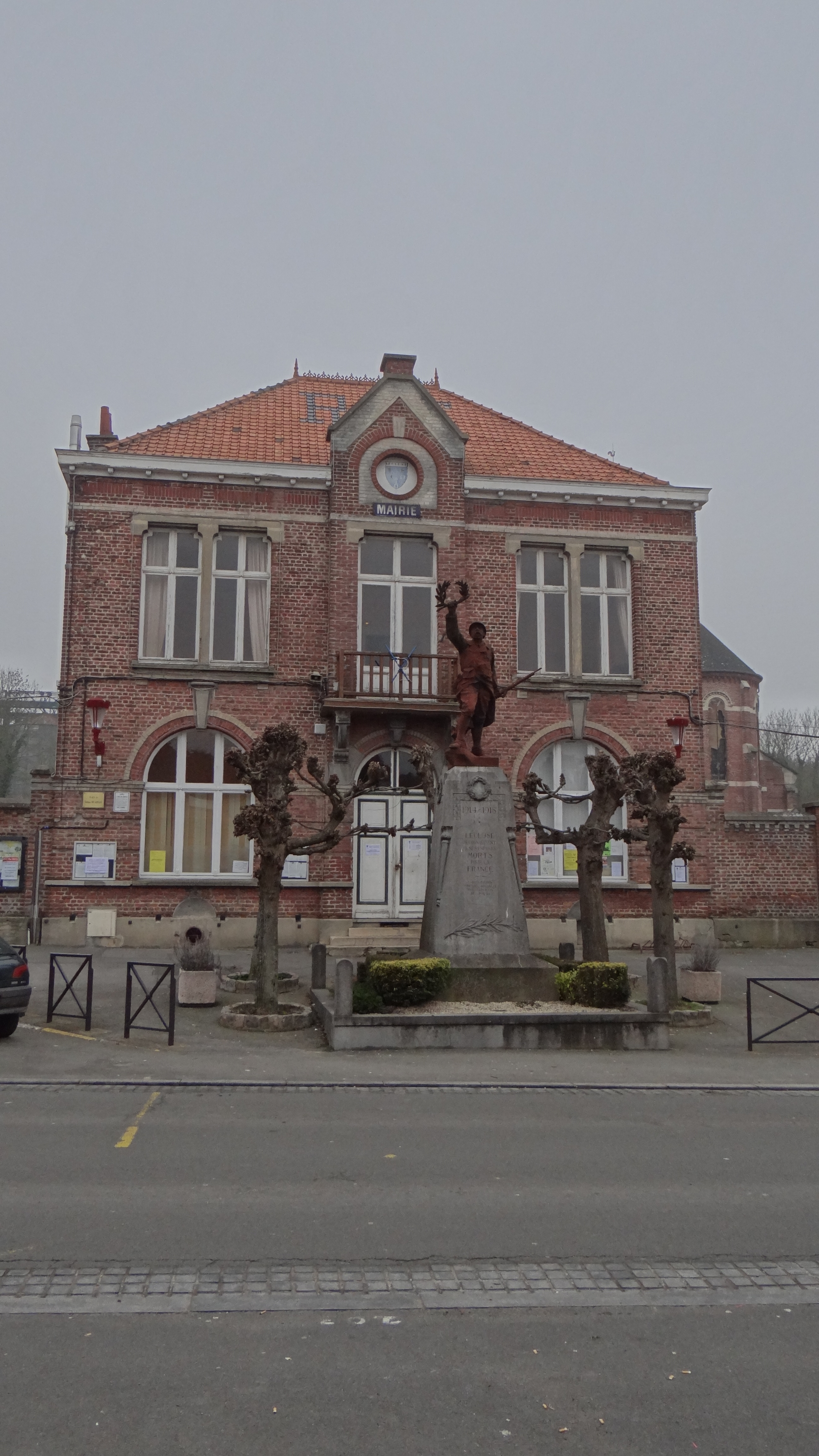
- The town hall in Lécluse

- Coat of arms
- Location of Lécluse
- Location within France Location within Hauts-de-France
- Coordinates: 50°16′39″N 3°02′31″E
- Country: France
- Region: Hauts-de-France
- Department: Nord
- Arrondissement: Douai
- Canton: Aniche
- Intercommunality: Douaisis Agglo

Government
  - Mayor (2020–2026): Nicole Descamps-Vottier
- Area^{1}: 4.96 km^{2} (1.92 sq mi)
- Elevation: 50 m (160 ft)
- Highest elevation: 75 m (246 ft)
- Lowest elevation: 35 m (115 ft)
- Population (2023): 1,346
  - Density: 271/km^{2} (703/sq mi)
- Time zone: UTC+01:00 (CET)
  - Summer (DST): UTC+02:00 (CEST)
- INSEE/Postal code: 59336 /59259
- ^{1} French Land Register data, which excludes lakes, ponds, glaciers > 1 km^{2} (0.386 sq mi or 247 acres) and river estuaries.

Lécluse (French pronunciation: [leklyz]) is a commune in the Nord department in northern France.

== Geography ==
The river Sensée flows through Lécluse.

== Heraldry ==
Arms of Lécluse	The arms of Lécluse are blazoned : Azure, 3 spurs Or, rowel upwards.

== See also ==
- Communes of the Nord department
