= Jean I of La Marche =

Second son of James I, Count of La Marche (1344–1393)

Jean de Bourbon
- Count of La Marche
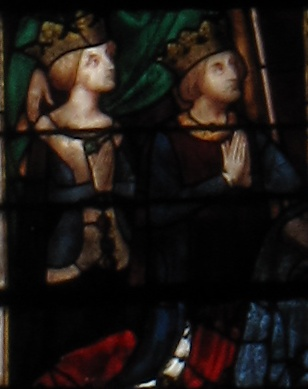
- Jean I and Catherine
- Born: 1344
- Died: 11 June 1393 (aged 48-49)
- Spouse: Catherine of Vendôme
- Issue: James II, Count of La Marche; Isabelle; Louis, Count of Vendôme; Jean, Lord of Carency; Anne, Countess of Montpensier; Marie, Lady of Brehencourt; Charlotte, Queen of Cyprus
Names
- John Bourbon
- House: Bourbon
- Father: James I, Count of La Marche
- Mother: Jeanne of Châtillon

Jean of Bourbon (John I/VII, Count of La Marche and of Vendôme) (1344 – 11 June 1393, Vendôme), was French prince du sang as the second son of James I, Count of La Marche, and Jeanne of Châtillon.

== Life ==
Jean was captured, but later ransomed, as a young man at the Battle of Poitiers. Following the deaths of his father and elder brother at the Battle of Brignais, Jean succeeded them as Count of La Marche.

Jean took an active part in the Hundred Years' War, and became Governor of Limousin after participating in its reconquering from the English. Later he joined Bertrand du Guesclin in his campaign of 1366 in Castile. In 1374, his brother-in-law Bouchard VII, Count of Vendôme, died, and Jean became Count of Vendôme and Castres in right of his wife.

Jean joined the campaign of Charles VI 1382 in Flanders (which culminated in the Battle of Roosebeke) and in 1392 fought in Brittany.

Jean rebuilt the castles of Vendôme and Lavardin.

== Marriage and children ==
On 28 September 1364, Jean married Catherine of Vendôme, countess of Vendôme (d. 1412) and daughter of John VI, Count of Vendôme.

Jean and Catherine had:

- James II, Count of La Marche and Castres (1370–1438).
- Isabelle (b. 1373), a nun at Poissy.
- Louis, Count of Vendôme (1376–1446).
- John, Lord of Carency (1378–1457), married c. 1416 Catherine, daughter of Philip of Artois, Count of Eu, without issue, married in 1420 at Le Mans, his mistress Jeanne de Vendômois, with whom he had issue.
- Anne (c. 1380 – September 1408, Paris), married in 1401 John of Berry, Count of Montpensier (d. 1401), married in Paris in 1402 Louis VII, Duke of Bavaria.
- Marie (1386 – aft. 11 September 1463), Lady of Brehencourt, married Jean de Baynes, Lord of Croix.
- Charlotte (1388 – 15 January 1422), married in 1411 at Nicosia King Janus of Cyprus.

Jean had an illegitimate son by an unknown woman:

- Jean, bastard of La Marche(fl.1436)

== Sources ==
- Barbier, Jean Paul (2002). Ma Bibliotheque Poetique. Vol. 3–4. Librairie Droz. ISBN 2-600-00606-0.
- Contamine, Philippe (2017). Guerre, état et société à la fin du moyen âge: Études sur les armées des rois de France 1337–1494 (in French). La Haye. ISBN 9783111330648.
- Curry, Anne; Ambühl, Rémy, eds. (2022). A Soldiers' Chronicle of the Hundred Years War. D.S. Brewer. ISBN 9781843846192.
- Richards, Earl Jeffrey (2007). "Political Thought as Improvisation: Female Regency and Mariology in Late Medieval French Thought". In Broad, Jacqueline; Green, Karen (eds.). Virtue, Liberty, and Toleration: Political Ideas of European Women, 1400-1800. Springer. pp. 1–22. ISBN 978-1-4020-5894-3.
- Potter, David (1995). A History of France, 1460–1560: The Emergence of a Nation State. New York: St. Martin's Press. ISBN 978-0312124809.

Preceded by Peter II	Count of La Marche; 1362–1393	Succeeded by James II
Preceded by Bouchard VII	Count of Castres; 1374–1393; With: Catherine	Succeeded by James II and Catherine
Preceded by Bouchard VII	Count of Vendôme; 1374–1393; With: Catherine	Succeeded by Louis and Catherine
