= James II of La Marche =

Consort of Joanna II of Naples from 1415 to 1435

James II
- King consort of Naples; Count of La Marche
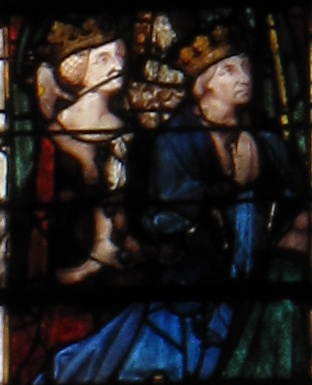
- 15th century stained glass depiction of James and his second wife, Queen Joanna II of Naples

Consort of the Neapolitan monarch
- Tenure: 10 August 1415 – 2 February 1435
- Born: 1370
- Died: 1438 (aged 67–68)
- Spouses: Beatrice of Navarre (m. 1406; died 1407) Joanna II of Naples (m. 1415; died 1435)
- Issue: Eleanor, Countess of La Marche, Castres. Duchesse of Nemours.
- House: Bourbon
- Father: John I, Count of La Marche
- Mother: Catherine of Vendôme

James II of Bourbon-La Marche (1370 – 1438 in Besançon) was count of La Marche. He was captured at the battle of Nicopolis in 1396, later being ransomed. In 1403, James led an attack on English soil and burned Plymouth. He married Queen Joanna II of Naples in 1415, and was largely unpopular being imprisoned then forced to leave the kingdom of Naples in 1419. James relinquished his titles and became a monk in 1435. He died in 1438.

== Early life ==
Coat of arms of James II, Count of La Marche

Born in 1370, James was the first son of John I, Count of La Marche and Catherine of Vendôme. He first bore arms in the crusade against the Ottomans which culminated in the Battle of Nicopolis, and was captured and ransomed. After returning to France, he commanded a force which invaded England in support of Owain Glyndŵr. His troops burned Plymouth in 1403, but twelve ships of his fleet were lost in a storm while returning to France in 1404.

James was an adherent of John the Fearless, Duke of Burgundy and foe of the Armagnac party. However, his affairs in France were interrupted by a sojourn abroad. In 1415, the barons of the Kingdom of Naples arranged his marriage to Queen Joanna II of Naples. It was hoped James would break the power of her court favorites, Pandolfo Alopo and Muzio Sforza. He was not given the title King, but was referred to as Vicar General, Duke of Calabria, and Prince of Taranto. James had Alopo executed and imprisoned Sforza, but also kept the queen in confinement and aspired to personal rule. The indignant barons captured and imprisoned him in 1416; he was compelled to free Sforza and resign the kingship, and was ejected from the kingdom in 1419.

Returning to France, James fought against the English for King Charles VII of France in 1428 and was made Governor of Languedoc.

In 1435, James resigned his titles and became a Franciscan friar, dying in 1438.

== Marriage ==
In 1406 in Pamplona, James married Beatrice of Navarre, Countess of La Marche, daughter of Charles III of Navarre and Eleanor of Castile. The couple had only one child:

- Eleanor of Bourbon-La Marche (Burlada, Navarre, 1407 – after 21 August 1464), married Bernard d'Armagnac, Count of Pardiac (d. 1462)

In 1415, James married Joanna II of Naples. They had no children.

== Sources ==
- Armstrong, Edward (1964). "The Papacy and Naples in the Fifteenth Century". In Previte-Orton, C.W.; Brooke, Z.N. (eds.). The Cambridge Medieval History. Vol. VIII. Cambridge: Cambridge at the University Press.
- McFarlane, K.B. (1964). "England: The Lancastrian Kings, 1399-1461". In Bury, John Bagnell; Previte-Orton, C.W.; Brooke, Z.N. (eds.). The Cambridge Medieval History. Vol. VIII. Cambridge: Cambridge University Press.
- Potter, David (1995). Keen, Maurice (ed.). A History of France, 1460–1560: The Emergence of a Nation State. New York: St. Martin's Press. ISBN 978-0312124809.
- Runciman, Steven (1999). A History of the Crusades. Vol. III: The Kingdom of Acre and the Later Crusades. Cambridge: Cambridge University Press. ISBN 0-521-34772-6.
- Setton, Kenneth M. (1976). The Papacy and the Levant, 1204–1571: The Thirteenth and Fourteenth Centuries. Vol. I. Philadelphia: American Philosophical Society. ISBN 0-87169-114-0.
- Woodacre, Elena (2013). The Queens Regnant of Navarre: Succession, Politics, and Partnership, 1274-1512. London: Palgrave Macmillan. ISBN 978-1137339140.

Preceded by John I	Count of La Marche; 1393–1435	Succeeded by Eleanor
Preceded by John I with Catherine of Vendôme	Count of Castres; 1393–1435; With: Catherine of Vendôme 1393–1412	Succeeded by Eleanor
Preceded by Ladislaus of Naples	Prince of Taranto; 1414–1420	Succeeded by Giovanni Antonio del Balzo Orsini
Vacant Title last held by Mary of Enghien as queen consort	Consort of the Neapolitan monarch (King consort 1415–1419); 1415–1435	Succeeded by Isabella, Duchess of Lorraine as queen consort
