= Louis, Count of Vendôme =

Count of Vendôme and Chartres

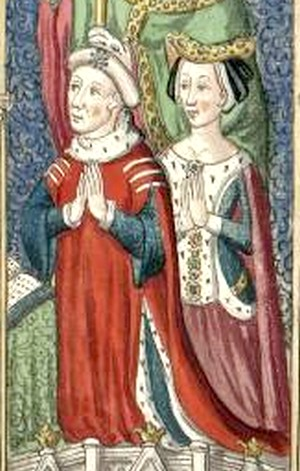
- Louis and his first wife, Blanche

Count of Vendôme
- Reign: 1393–1446
- Predecessor: Jeanne of Vendôme and John VII
- Successor: John VIII, Count of Vendôme
- Born: 1382
- Died: 21 December 1446 (aged 69–70); Tours
- Spouse: Blanche de Roucy; Jeanne de Laval
- Issue: John VIII, Count of Vendôme; Gabrielle de Bourbon; Catherine de Bourbon
- House: Bourbon; Bourbon-Vendôme (Founder)
- Father: John I, Count of La Marche
- Mother: Catherine de Vendôme

Louis de Bourbon (Louis I, Count of Vendôme) (1382 – December 21, 1446), younger son of John I, Count of La Marche, and Catherine de Vendôme, was a French prince du sang, as well as Count of Vendôme from 1393 and Count of Castres from 1425 until his death.

Louis was a supporter of the Duke of Orléans, and obtained valuable posts at court, becoming Grand Chamberlain of France in 1408 and Grand Master of France in 1413. As part of the Armagnac faction, he was at odds with the Burgundians and was imprisoned by them twice, in 1407 and 1412.

In 1414, Louis married Blanche (d. 1421), daughter of Hugh II, Count of Roucy. However, at the next year, he led the French cavalry on the left-wing and was captured by the English at the Battle of Agincourt, then held by them for some time. Freed, he was in command of French forces at Cravant and later captured on 31 July 1423.

In 1424, he married Jeanne de Laval (d. 1468), daughter of Guy XIII, Count of Laval, and Anne de Laval, at Rennes. They had:

- Catherine de Bourbon (b. 1425)
- Gabrielle de Bourbon (b. 1426)
- John VIII, Count of Vendôme (1425–1477)

He also had an illegitimate son, fathered with the Englishwoman Sybil Bostum during his captivity:

- John de Bourbon, Bastard of Vendôme (c. 1420–1496), Seigneur de Preaux.

Faithful to King Charles VII, he subsequently joined Joan of Arc and many other French nobles at the defense of Orléans in 1429, commanded at the siege of Jargeau, and assisted in the king's coronation at Reims. He was later present at the Treaty of Arras (1435). He died in Tours.

== Sources ==
- Askins, William (2000). "The Brothers Orleans and their Keepers". In Arn, Mary-Jo (ed.). Charles D'Orléans in England, 1415-1440. D.S. Brewer.
  - Barbier, Jean Paul (2002). Ma Bibliotheque Poetique (in French). Vol. 3–4. Librairie Droz. ISBN 2-600-00606-0.
- Grammit, David (2010). "Battle near Crevant". In Rogers, Clifford J. (ed.). The Oxford Encyclopedia of Medieval Warfare and Military Technology. Vol. 1. Oxford University Press.
- Grummitt, David (2015). Henry VI. Routledge.
- Henneman, John Bell (1995). "Bourbon". In Kibler, William W. (ed.). Medieval France: An Encyclopedia. Routledge.
- Potter, David (1995). Keen, Maurice (ed.). A History of France, 1460–1560: The Emergence of a Nation State. Macmillan.
- Walsby, Malcolm (2007). The Counts of Laval: Culture, Patronage and Religion in Fifteenth- and Sixteenth-Century France. Ashgate.

Preceded by Jeanne with John VII	Count of Vendôme with Catherine to 1403; 1393–1446	Succeeded by Jean VIII
Preceded by —	Count of Chartres; 1425–1446	Succeeded by to royal domain
