= Carency =

- Commune
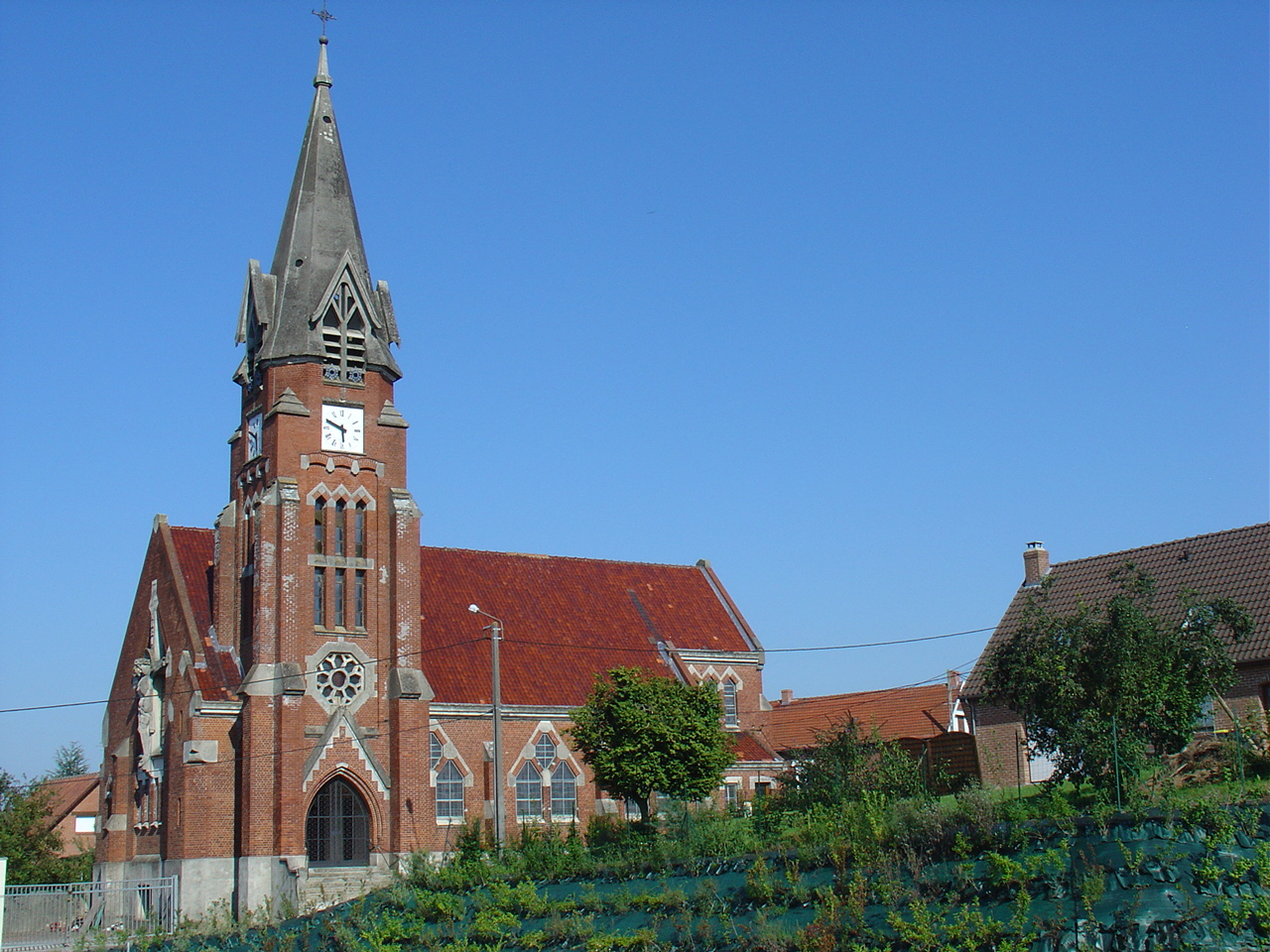
- The church of Carency

- Coat of arms
- Location of Carency
- Location within France Location within Hauts-de-France
- Coordinates: 50°22′45″N 2°42′18″E
- Country: France
- Region: Hauts-de-France
- Department: Pas-de-Calais
- Arrondissement: Lens
- Canton: Bully-les-Mines
- Intercommunality: CA Lens-Liévin

Government
  - Mayor (2020–2026): Justin Clairet
- Area^{1}: 8.6 km^{2} (3.3 sq mi)
- Elevation: 111 m (364 ft)
- Highest elevation: 152 m (499 ft)
- Lowest elevation: 79 m (259 ft)
- Population (2023): 819
  - Density: 95/km^{2} (250/sq mi)
- Time zone: UTC+01:00 (CET)
  - Summer (DST): UTC+02:00 (CEST)
- INSEE/Postal code: 62213 /62144
- ^{1} French Land Register data, which excludes lakes, ponds, glaciers > 1 km^{2} (0.386 sq mi or 247 acres) and river estuaries.

Carency (French pronunciation: [kaʁɑ̃si]) is a commune in the Pas-de-Calais department in the Hauts-de-France region of France. 8 miles (13 km) northwest of Arras. Carency is also the name of the brook upstream of the Deûle river which flows through the village.

== Population ==
Historical population
| Year | Pop. | ±% p.a. |
|---|---|---|
| 1968 | 507 | — |
| 1975 | 525 | +0.50% |
| 1982 | 552 | +0.72% |
| 1990 | 711 | +3.21% |
| 1999 | 668 | −0.69% |
| 2007 | 713 | +0.82% |
| 2012 | 712 | −0.03% |
| 2017 | 750 | +1.05% |
| 2023 | 819 | +1.48% |
Source: INSEE

== Notable people ==
- François Faber, bicyclist, died there in the Second Battle of Artois in World War I.

== See also ==
- Communes of the Pas-de-Calais department
