= Duisans =

- Commune
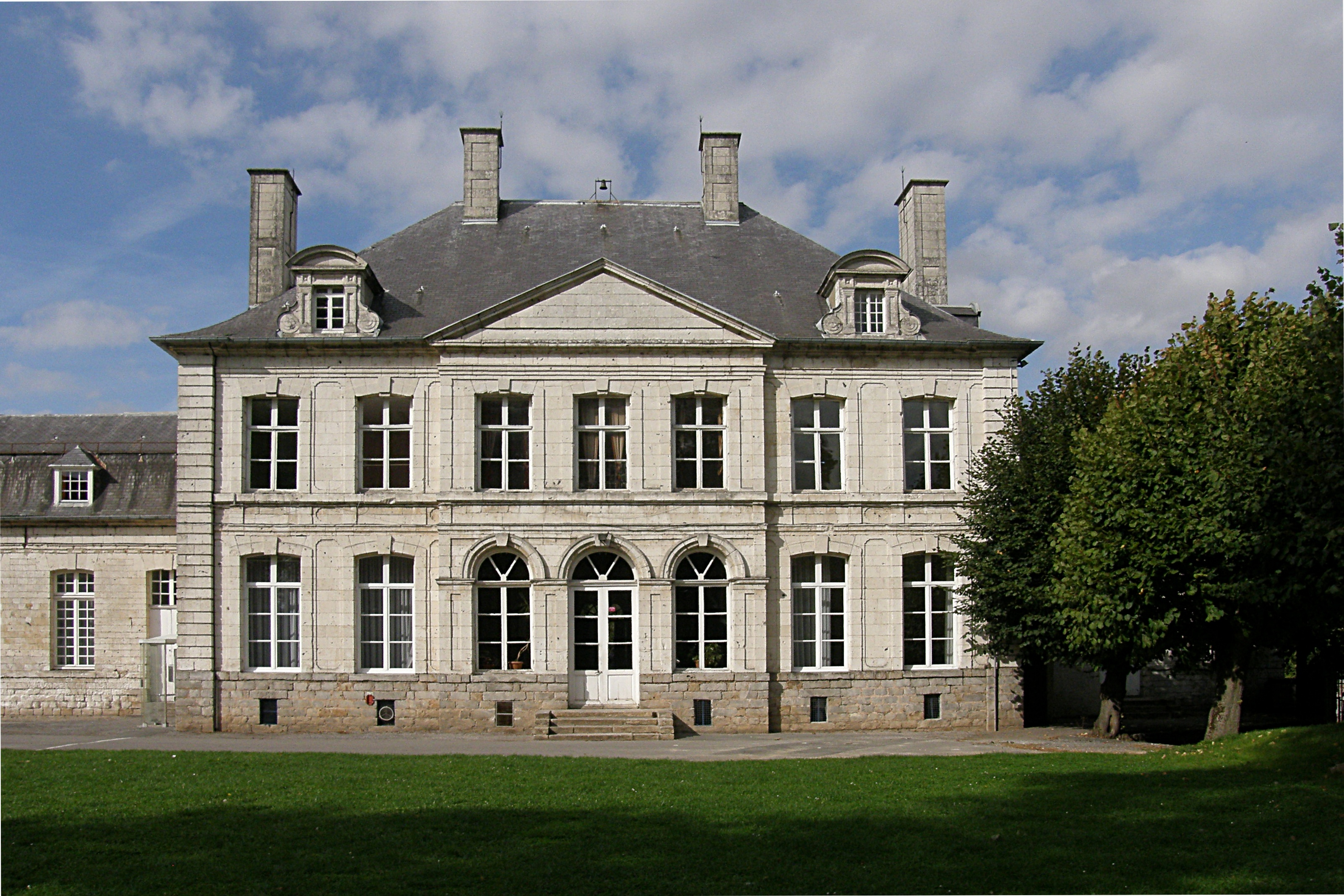
- Château de Duisans

- Coat of arms
- Location of Duisans
- Location within France Location within Hauts-de-France
- Coordinates: 50°18′30″N 2°41′07″E
- Country: France
- Region: Hauts-de-France
- Department: Pas-de-Calais
- Arrondissement: Arras
- Canton: Avesnes-le-Comte
- Intercommunality: CC Campagnes de l'Artois

Government
  - Mayor (2020–2026): Éric Poulain
- Area^{1}: 10.72 km^{2} (4.14 sq mi)
- Elevation: 68 m (223 ft)
- Highest elevation: 107 m (351 ft)
- Lowest elevation: 56 m (184 ft)
- Population (2023): 1,399
  - Density: 130.5/km^{2} (338.0/sq mi)
- Time zone: UTC+01:00 (CET)
  - Summer (DST): UTC+02:00 (CEST)
- INSEE/Postal code: 62279 /62161
- ^{1} French Land Register data, which excludes lakes, ponds, glaciers > 1 km^{2} (0.386 sq mi or 247 acres) and river estuaries.

Duisans (French pronunciation: [dɥizɑ̃]) is a commune in the Pas-de-Calais department in the Hauts-de-France region of France.

== Geography ==
A farming village 5 miles (8.0 km) northwest of Arras at the junction of the D55 and D56 roads. The small river Gy, a tributary of the Scarpe river, flows through the village.

== Population ==
Historical population
Year	Pop.	±% p.a.
1968	716	—
1975	881	+3.01%
1982	993	+1.72%
1990	1,022	+0.36%
1999	1,091	+0.73%
2007	1,174	+0.92%
2012	1,176	+0.03%
2017	1,309	+2.17%
2023	1,399	+1.11%
Source: INSEE

== Places of interest ==
- The church of St. Leger, dating from the fifteenth century.
- The eighteenth-century chateau, built by Antoine-Guillaume Dubois de Hanovre.
- Two 17th-century chapels.

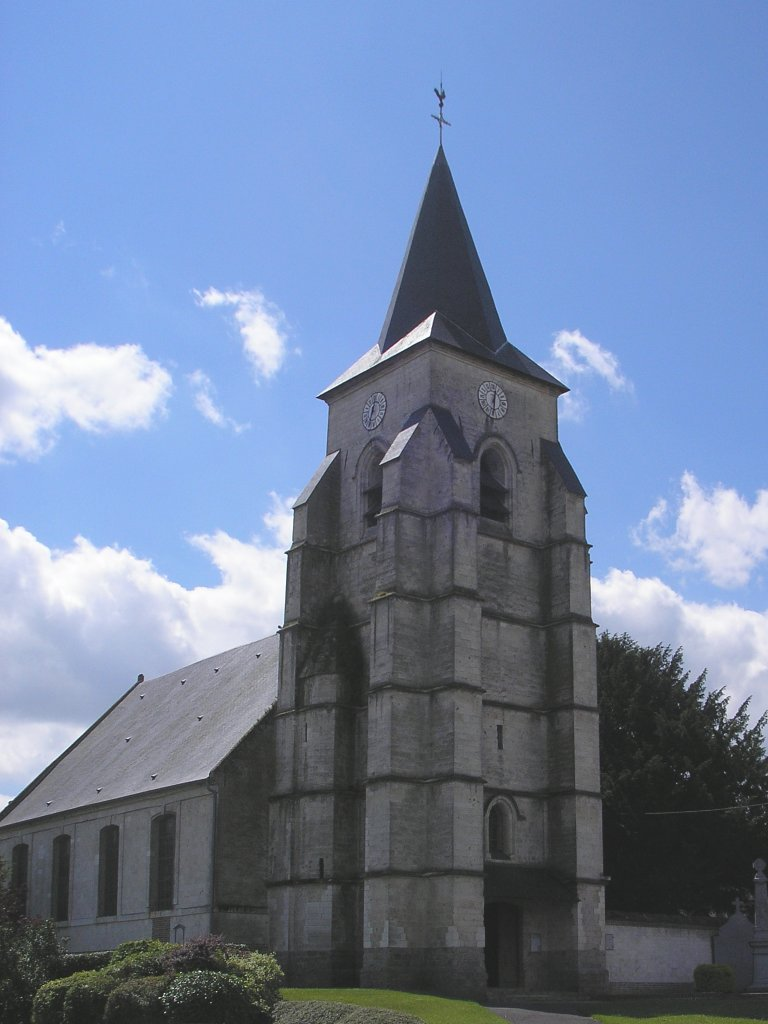
Duisans church

- A war cemetery with c.2,500 graves outside the village

== See also ==
- Communes of the Pas-de-Calais department
