= Count of Castres =

The Count of Castres was a title in the French nobility.

It was held by:

- John I, Count of La Marche
- Bernard d'Armagnac, Count of Pardiac
- Alan of Albret (1440–1522)
- Boffille de Juge
- Philip de Montfort
- Frederick (970-6 January 1022), Count of Verdun, son of Godfrey I the Prisoner
