= Cardinal de Soubise =

French Roman Catholic cardinal

His Eminence Cardinal de Soubise
- Cardinal, Bishop of Strasbourg
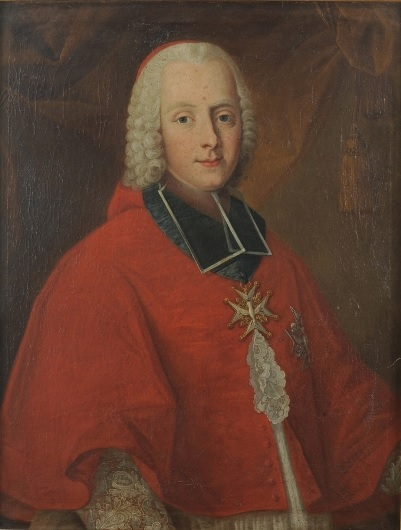
- Church: Roman Catholic Church
- In office: 1749–1756
- Predecessor: Armand Gaston Maximilien de Rohan
- Successor: Louis Constantin de Rohan
- Previous posts: Grand Almoner of France (1745–1748); Coadjutor Bishop of Strasbourg (1742–1749); Titular Bishop of Ptolemais in Thebaide (1742–1749)

Orders
- Ordination: 23 December 1741
- Consecration: 4 November 1742 by Armand Gaston Maximilien de Rohan
- Created cardinal: 10 April 1747 by Pope Benedict XIV
- Rank: Cardinal-Priest

Personal details
- Born: 1 December 1717 Paris, France
- Died: 28 June 1756 (aged 38) Saverne, France

François-Armand-Auguste de Rohan-Soubise, Prince of Tournon, Prince of Rohan (1 December 1717, Paris – 28 June 1756, Saverne) was a French prelate, Prince-Bishop of Strasbourg. His parents, Anne Julie de Melun and Jules, Prince de Soubise, both died of smallpox when he was still a child.

== Biography ==
He received Holy Orders as a Catholic priest on 23 December 1741 and received the position of commendatory abbot first of the Abbey of Ventadour, which was succeeded by that of Saint-Epvre (in the Diocese of Toul) from 1736, and later added was that of Prince-Abbot of the Abbeys of Murbach and of Lure in 1737. He was elected to the Académie française on 15 July 1741.

A year later he was appointed coadjutor bishop of the Diocese of Strasbourg. He was the great-nephew of the incumbent Prince-Bishop, Cardinal Armand Gaston Maximilien de Rohan, and was simultaneously named as the titular bishop in partibus of Ptolemais in Palestine (now Acre, Israel). He was consecrated a bishop on the following 4 November. He was made Grand Almoner of France in 1745 and a cardinal in 1747.

Upon the death of his great-uncle in 1749, he automatically became Prince-Bishop of Strasbourg and became commendatory abbot of the great Abbey of La Chaise-Dieu that same year, giving up that of Saint-Epvre.

He died in 1756 of tuberculosis.

== Siblings ==
- Charles de Rohan, Prince of Soubise, Duke of Rohan-Rohan (16 July 1715–4 July 1787) married Anne Marie Louise de La Tour d'Auvergne (1722–1739) and had issue; married again to Princess Anna Teresa of Savoy (1717–1745) and had issue; married Victoire of Hesse-Rotenburg (1728–1792) no issue;
- Marie Louise Geneviève de Rohan (7 January 1720–4 March 1803) married Gaston Jean Baptiste de Lorraine, Count of Marsan, no issue;
- François Auguste de Rohan, Count of Tournon (16 September 1721–6 August 1736) never married;
- René de Rohan, O.S.B., monk of the Abbey of Luxeuil (26 July 1723–7 February 1743) never married.

== Ancestry ==
Ancestors of Cardinal de Soubise

16. Hercule de Rohan, Duke of Montbazon
8. François de Rohan, Prince of Soubise
17. Marie de Bretagne d'Avaugour
4. Hercule Mériadec de Rohan, Duke of Rohan-Rohan
18. Henri Chabot, Duke of Rohan
9. Anne de Rohan-Chabot, Princess of Soubise
19. Marguerite de Rohan
2. Jules de Rohan, Prince of Soubise
20. Charles de Lévis, Duke of Ventadour
10. Louis Charles de Lévis, Duke of Ventadour
21. Marie de La Guiche
5. Anne Geneviève de Lévis
22. Philippe de La Mothe Houdancourt, Duke of Cardona
11. Charlotte de La Motte Houdancourt
23. Louise de Prie
1. Armand de Rohan
24. Guillaume de Melun, Prince of Epinoy
12. Alexandre Guillaume de Melun, Prince of Epinoy
25. Princesse Ernestine d'Arenberg
6. Louis de Melun, Prince of Epinoy
26. Henri Chabot, Duke of Rohan =18
13. Jeanne Pelagie de Rohan-Chabot
27. Marguerite de Rohan =19
3. Anne Julie de Melun
28. Charles de Lorraine, Duke of Elbeuf
14. François Marie de Lorraine, Prince of Lillebonne
29. Catherine Henriette de Bourbon, Légitimée de France, "Mademoiselle de Vendôme"
7. Élisabeth Thérèse de Lorraine
30. Charles IV, Duke of Lorraine
15. Anne de Lorraine
31. Béatrix de Cusance

== See also ==
- House of Rohan
- Palais Rohan, Strasbourg

Catholic Church titles
Preceded by Armand Gaston Maximilien de Rohan	Bishop of Strasbourg; 1749-1756	Succeeded by Charles Louis Constantin de Rohan-Guéménée
