= Marie Louise de Rohan =

Marie Louise
- Countess of Marsan
- Born: 7 January 1720; Paris, France
- Died: 4 March 1803 (aged 83); Regensburg, Holy Roman Empire
- Spouse: Gaston Jean Baptiste de Lorraine
Names
- Marie Louise Geneviève de Rohan
- House: Rohan
- Father: Jules, Prince of Soubise
- Mother: Anne Julie de Melun

Marie Louise de Rohan (Marie Louise Geneviève; 7 January 1720 – 4 March 1803), also known as Madame de Marsan, was the governess of Louis XVI of France and his siblings. She was an influential figure of the French court and a driving force of the Dévots and the conservative fraction of the court nobility.

== Biography ==
Marie Louise was the only daughter of Jules de Rohan, Prince of Soubise and his wife, Anne Julie de Melun. She was the sister of Charles, Prince of Soubise and François Armand Auguste de Rohan.

After her parents died of smallpox in 1724 in Paris, she and her brothers lived at Versailles with their uncle, Hercule Mériadec de Rohan, Prince of Guéméné. Her eldest brother Charles was the same age as Louis XV and became Louis' great companion.

On 4 June 1736, Marie Louise married Prince Gaston Jean Baptiste de Lorraine, Count of Marsan and Walhaim, (1721–1743). The nuptials were carried out in the chapel of the hôtel de Mayenne by her great-uncle the Cardinal de Soubise.

At the age of 23 in 1743, Marie Louise became a widow as her husband died of smallpox like her parents. Afterwards, she led a pious and reserved life. The couple had no surviving children. As a widow, she took Louis-Guillaume Le Monnier as a lover; he was the physician to Louis XV.

=== Royal governess ===
Since 1727, the position of royal governess had been held by some female member of Madame de Marsan's family. Her great-grandmother, Madame de Ventadour, was the governess of the children of Louis de France, Duke of Burgundy, including Louis XV, and then the children of Louis XV himself. In 1735, Ventadour resigned and the post went to Madame de Marsan's aunt, Marie Isabelle de Rohan, Duchess of Tallard (1699–1754).

When Madame de Tallard died in 1754, Marie Louise was appointed to her aunt's position as royal governess and took over the care of Louis XV's ten children. Madame de Marsan remained as governess for twenty-two years, and taught the future Louis XVI and his siblings. Her favorite charge was the Count of Provence; he in turn called her ma chère petite chère amie. She took a progressive initiative when engaging the Marquise de la Ferté Imbault, daughter of Madame Geoffrin, to educate the princesses in philosophy, a subject normally only taught to boys at that time. In practice, she turned the education of Élisabeth of France over to the sub governess (sous gouvernante) Marie Angélique de Mackau, but Clotilde of France was her favorite among her female pupils, and she accompanied her on her journey to her wedding in Savoy in 1775. During her tenure as royal governess, she was granted an apartment in the Tuileries Palace, which was called Pavillon de Marsan after her.

She was commonly known as Madame de Marsan. She had an influential position at court, where she was a powerful force within of the Dévots and a guardian of the privileges of her family.

Reportedly, Madame de Marsan disliked the marriage between the future Louis XVI and Marie Antoinette of Austria in 1770; she would have preferred another match for the Dauphin, and continued to belong to the opposition of Marie Antoinette after her arrival to France.

In 1776, she resigned from her position during a mass exodus of older nobles from the court because of Queen Marie Antoinette's disdain for formal court etiquette. She resigned her post in favour of her niece, the Princess of Guéméné.

She resided at her hôtel on the rue Neuve Saint Augustine in Paris.

=== Later life ===
In 1777, Marie Louise used her influence with King Louis XVI to have her cousin Louis René de Rohan appointed the Grand Almoner of France.

In 1785, she unsuccessfully appealed on her knees to the queen, despite her dislike for the latter, to show mercy to her nephew the Cardinal de Rohan, who was implicated in the famous Affair of the Diamond Necklace. She appeared in court during the case against Louis de Rohan alongside the rest of the Rohan clan, dressed in black, and when the judges arrived, she reportedly rose and proclaimed: "Messieurs, you have come to judge us all!"

She emigrated from France in 1789 after the beginning of the French Revolution. She died in Linz in exile at the age of 83.

== Ancestry ==
Ancestors of Marie Louise de Rohan

16. Hercule de Rohan, Duke of Montbazon
8. François de Rohan, Prince of Soubise
17. Marie de Bretagne d'Avaugour
4. Hercule Mériadec de Rohan, Duke of Rohan-Rohan
18. Henri Chabot, Duke of Rohan
9. Anne de Rohan-Chabot, Princess of Soubise
19. Marguerite de Rohan
2. Jules de Rohan, Prince of Soubise
20. Charles de Lévis, Duke of Ventadour
10. Louis Charles de Lévis, Duke of Ventadour
21. Marie de La Guiche
5. Anne Geneviève de Lévis
22. Philippe de La Mothe Houdancourt, Duke of Cardona
11. Charlotte de La Motte Houdancourt
23. Louise de Prie
1. Marie Louise Geneviève de Rohan
24. Guillaume de Melun, Prince of Epinoy
12. Alexandre Guillaume de Melun, Prince of Epinoy
25. Princesse Ernestine d'Arenberg
6. Louis de Melun, Prince of Epinoy
26. Henri Chabot, Duke of Rohan =18
13. Jeanne Pelagie de Rohan-Chabot
27. Marguerite de Rohan =19
3. Anne Julie de Melun
28. Charles de Lorraine, Duke of Elbeuf
14. François Marie de Lorraine, Prince of Lillebonne
29. Catherine Henriette de Bourbon, Légitimée de France, "Mademoiselle de Vendôme"
7. Élisabeth Thérèse de Lorraine
30. Charles IV, Duke of Lorraine
15. Anne de Lorraine
31. Béatrix de Cusance

== References and notes ==
Court offices
Preceded by The Duchess of Tallard	Governess of the Children of France; 1754–1776	Succeeded by The Princess of Guéméné
