= Marie Isabelle de Rohan, Duchess of Tallard =

Marie Isabelle
- Duchess of Tallard
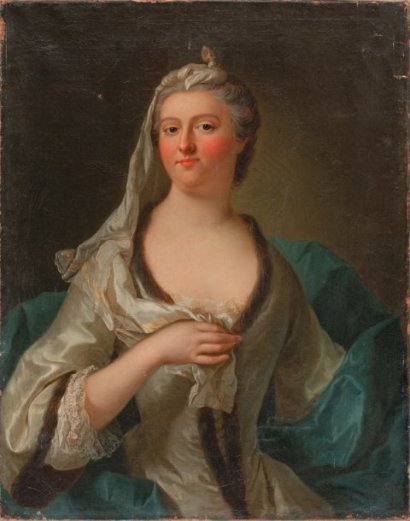
- Born: 17 January 1699; Rue de Paradis, Paris, France
- Died: 5 January 1754 (aged 54); Palace of Versailles, France
- Burial: 7 January 1754; Église de La Merci, Paris
- Spouse: Joseph d'Hostun de La Baume
Names
- Marie Isabelle Gabrielle Angélique de Rohan
- Father: Hercule Mériadec de Rohan
- Mother: Anne Geneviève de Lévis

Marie Isabelle de Rohan, Duchess of Tallard (Marie Isabelle Gabrielle Angélique; 17 January 1699 – 5 January 1754) was a French noblewoman and granddaughter of Madame de Ventadour. Marie Isabelle was the governess of the children of Louis XV and his consort Marie Leszczyńska.

== Biography ==
Born in Paris the fourth child of five. Her father was Hercule Mériadec de Rohan, Duke of Rohan-Rohan and his first wife Anne Geneviève de Lévis. As a member of the House of Rohan she enjoyed the prestigious rank of a Foreign Princess given to her family in the early 17th century due to them claiming ancestry back to the Dukes of Brittany. As such, this allowed the style of Highness. Her siblings included Louise Françoise, Duchess of La Meilleraye (married a grandson of Hortense Mancini and present ancestress of the Prince of Monaco) Jules, Prince of Soubise, Louise, Princess of Guéméné (wife of Hercule Mériadec, Prince of Guéméné). Her uncle was the Bishop of Strasbourg.

She married Joseph d'Hostun de La Baume, son of Camille d'Hostun de La Baume, Duke of Tallard on 13 March 1713; the bride was fourteen. Her husband was some seventeen years older than she. The young duchess was attached to the household of Elizabeth Charlotte of the Palatinate, Madame, wife of the late Philippe de France, Monsieur and mother of the future Philippe d'Orléans, Regent of France; Marie Isabelle's grandmother Madame de Ventadour was also part of Madame's household.

=== Court office ===
In 1735, her grand mother Charlotte de La Mothe-Houdancourt retired from her post as Governess of the Children of France. The position was thus given to Marie Isabelle. She would hold the post till her resignation on 10 January 1754 when her niece Madame de Marsan took up the role. Her sister in law Anne Julie de Melun also acted as an under governess to the royal children.

Madame de Tallard was a lady in waiting to Princess Henriette of France, daughter of Louis XV and his consort Marie Leszczyńska. She was also a dame du palais to Queen Marie. The queen is said to have been fond of the young duchess and Louis XV was a frequent of her dinner parties at Versailles. From 1735–54, she was responsible for the education and protection of Louis, Dauphin of France as well as his many sisters - the princesses Louise Élisabeth, her twin Henriette and Princess Adélaïde. She was later responsible for the daughters of the Dauphin himself. Marie Isabelle was present at the presentation of Anne Marie Louise de La Tour d'Auvergne, her great nephew's first wife.

She died over the night of 4–5 January 1754 at the Palace of Versailles and named her cousin Charles, Prince of Rochefort as her heir. She died without having children. Her husband outlived her by twenty months. Her death was a great sorrow for the king as well as her many students.

She was buried on 7 January 1754 at the Église de La Merci in Paris, the traditional burial place of the Soubise line of the House of Rohan.

== Ancestry ==
Ancestors of Marie Isabelle de Rohan, Duchess of Tallard

8. Hercule de Rohan, Duke of Montbazon
4. François de Rohan, Prince of Soubise
9. Marie de Bretagne d'Avaugour
2. Hercule Mériadec de Rohan, Duke of Rohan-Rohan
10. Henri Chabot, Duke of Rohan
5. Anne de Rohan-Chabot, Princess of Soubise
11. Marguerite de Rohan
1. Marie Isabelle de Rohan
12. Charles de Lévis, Duke of Ventadour
6. Louis Charles de Lévis, Duke of Ventadour
13. Marie de La Guiche
3. Anne Geneviève de Lévis
14. Philippe de La Mothe Houdancourt, Duke of Cardona
7. Charlotte de La Motte Houdancourt
15. Louise de Prie

== References and notes ==
Court offices
Preceded by The Duchess of Ventadour	Governess of the Children of France; 1735–1754	Succeeded by The Countess of Marsan
