= Duchess of Rohan-Rohan =

Picture	Name	Father	Birth	Marriage	Became Duchess	Ceased to be Duchess	Death	Spouse
	Anne Geneviève de Lévis	Louis Charles de Lévis (Lévis)	February 1673	15 February 1694	14 December 1714; Dukedom created for her husband	20 March 1727		Hercule Mériadec, Prince of Soubise, Duke of Rohan-Rohan
	Marie Sophie de Courcillon	Philippe Egon de Courcillon (Courcillon)	6 Aug 1713	2 Sep 1732		26 January 1749 husband's death	4 April 1756	Hercule Mériadec, Prince of Soubise, Duke of Rohan-Rohan
	Anne Julie de Melun	Louis de Melun, Prince of Epinoy (Melun)	1698	16 September 1714		6 May 1724 husband's death	18 May 1724	Jules, Prince of Soubise
	Anne Marie Louise de La Tour d'Auvergne	Emmanuel Théodose de La Tour d'Auvergne (La Tour d'Auvergne)	1 August 1722	29 December 1734		19 September 1739		Charles, Prince of Soubise
	Anne Thérèse of Savoy	Victor Amadeus I, Prince of Carignan (Savoy)	1 November 1717	6 November 1741		5 April 1745		Charles, Prince of Soubise
	Landgravine Viktoria of Hesse-Rotenburg	Joseph, Hereditary Prince of Hesse-Rotenburg (Hesse-Rotenburg)	25 February 1728	23 December 1745		4 July 1787husband's death	1 July 1792	Charles, Prince of Soubise
