= Jules de Rohan, 3rd Prince of Soubise =

French nobleman and 3rd Prince of Soubise

Jules de Rohan
- 3rd Prince of Soubise
- Born: 16 January 1697; Paris, France
- Died: 6 May 1724 (aged 27); Hôtel de Soubise, Paris, France
- Noble family: Rohan
- Spouse: Anne Julie de Melun (m. 1714)
- Issue Detail: Charles, Prince of Soubise; Armand, Cardinal de Soubise; Marie Louise, Countess of Marsan
- Father: Hercule Mériadec de Rohan
- Mother: Anne Geneviève de Lévis

Jules François Louis de Rohan (16 January 1697 – 6 May 1724) was a French nobleman and 3rd Prince of Soubise. He died of smallpox aged twenty-seven.

== Biography ==
Born in Paris to Hercule Mériadec de Rohan and his wife Anne Geneviève de Lévis, as a member of the House of Rohan, he was entitled to the style of Highness. His mother was the only child of Madame de Ventadour.

At the age of seventeen, he married Anne Julie de Melun. The couple were wed in Paris on 16 September 1714. His wife was a daughter of Louis de Melun and Élisabeth Thérèse de Lorraine, herself a great granddaughter of Henry IV of France and were the parents of five children.

In May 1724, he and his wife caught smallpox. Jules was first to succumb to the illness and was followed by his wife on 18 May.

== Issue ==
1. Charles de Rohan, Prince of Soubise, Duke of Rohan-Rohan (16 July 1715 – 4 July 1787) married Anne Marie Louise de La Tour d'Auvergne (1722–1739) and had issue; married again to Princess Anna Teresa of Savoy (1717–1745) and had issue; married Landgravine Anna Viktoria of Hesse-Rotenburg (1728–1792) no issue;
2. François Armand Auguste de Rohan, cardinal de Soubise, Prince of Tournon (1 December 1717–28 June 1758)
3. Marie Louise de Rohan (7 January 1720 – 4 March 1803) married Gaston Jean Baptiste de Lorraine, Count of Marsan, no issue; brother of Mademoiselle de Marsan.
4. François Auguste de Rohan, Count of Tournon (16 September 1721 – 6 August 1736) never married;
5. René de Rohan, Abbot of Luxeuil (26 July 1723 – 7 February 1743) never married.

== Ancestry ==
Ancestors of Jules de Rohan, 3rd Prince of Soubise

8. Hercule de Rohan, Duke of Montbazon
4. François de Rohan, Prince of Soubise
9. Marie de Bretagne d'Avaugour
2. Hercule Mériadec de Rohan, Duke of Rohan-Rohan
10. Henri Chabot, Duke of Rohan
5. Anne de Rohan-Chabot, Princess of Soubise
11. Marguerite de Rohan
1. Jules de Rohan, 3rd Prince of Soubise
12. Charles de Lévis, Duke of Ventadour
6. Louis Charles de Lévis, Duke of Ventadour
13. Marie de La Guiche
3. Anne Geneviève de Lévis
14. Philippe de La Mothe Houdancourt, Duke of Cardona
7. Charlotte de La Motte Houdancourt
15. Louise de Prie
