= Victoire de Rohan =

French noblewoman and court official

- Princess of Guéméné
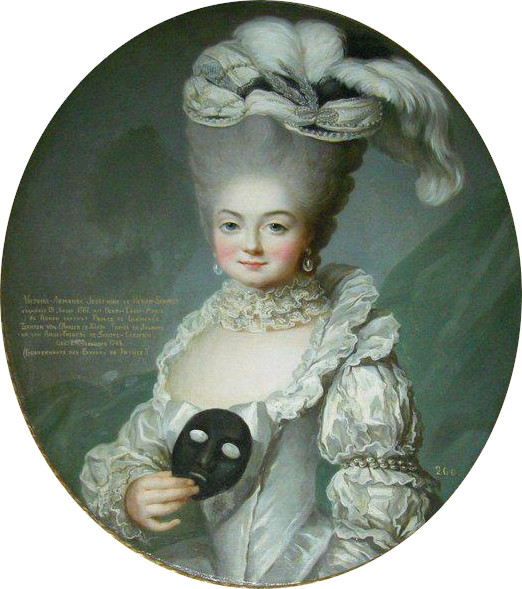
- Born: 28 December 1743; Hôtel de Soubise, Paris, France
- Died: 20 September 1807 (aged 63); Paris, France
- Noble family: Rohan
- Spouse: Henri Louis, Prince of Guéméné
- Issue Detail: Charles Alain, Prince of Guéméné; Marie Louise Joséphine, Princess of Rochefort; Louis Victor, Duke of Bouillon
- Father: Charles de Rohan
- Mother: Anne Therese of Savoy

Victoire de Rohan, Princess of Guéméné (Victoire Armande Joséphe; 28 December 1743 – 20 September 1807) was a French noblewoman and court official. She was the governess of the children of Louis XVI of France. She is known better as Madame de Guéméné, and was suo jure Lady of Clisson.

== Biography ==
Victoire Armande Josèphe de Rohan was the second daughter of Charles de Rohan, Prince of Soubise. The Princes of Soubise were a cadet branch of the House of Rohan. Her mother was Princess Anna Teresa of Savoy, a daughter of Victor Amadeus, Prince of Carignano. Her mother was also a first cousin of Louis XV through an illegitimate line. She had an older half-sister, Charlotte de Rohan, who married in 1753 Louis Joseph de Bourbon, Prince de Condé. As the Princesse de Condé, Charlotte was a princesse du sang and far outranked her younger half-sister.

As the House of Rohan claimed descent from the medieval Dukes of Brittany, its members were treated at court as princes étrangers with the style of Highness.

=== Marriage ===
At the age of seventeen, Victoire married her cousin, Henri Louis de Rohan, Duke of Montbazon, who was fifteen at the time. He was a member of the senior branch of Rohan, the Princes of Guéméné. He was a nephew of the Cardinal de Rohan, who was disgraced in the infamous Affair of the Diamond Necklace. Henri Louis eventually became the Grand Chamberlain of France. The couple had five children.

Upon the death of his father in 1788, the Duke inherited the title of Prince de Guéméné. Afterwards, Victoire was known at court as Madame de Guéméné. At the death of her father, her spouse became heir to the title Prince de Soubise. She and her family lived lavishly in Paris at the Hôtel de Rohan-Guéméné, located on the famous Place des Vosges.

=== Courtier ===
In 1775, Marie Louise de Lorraine, Comtesse de Marsan resigned the post of governess to the royal children in favour of Victoire, who was her niece. From 1778 to 1782, Victoire was in charge of the household of Louis XVI's oldest child, Marie Thérèse of France, known at court as Madame Royale. In this role, she was in charge of a staff of over one hundred courtiers and servants.

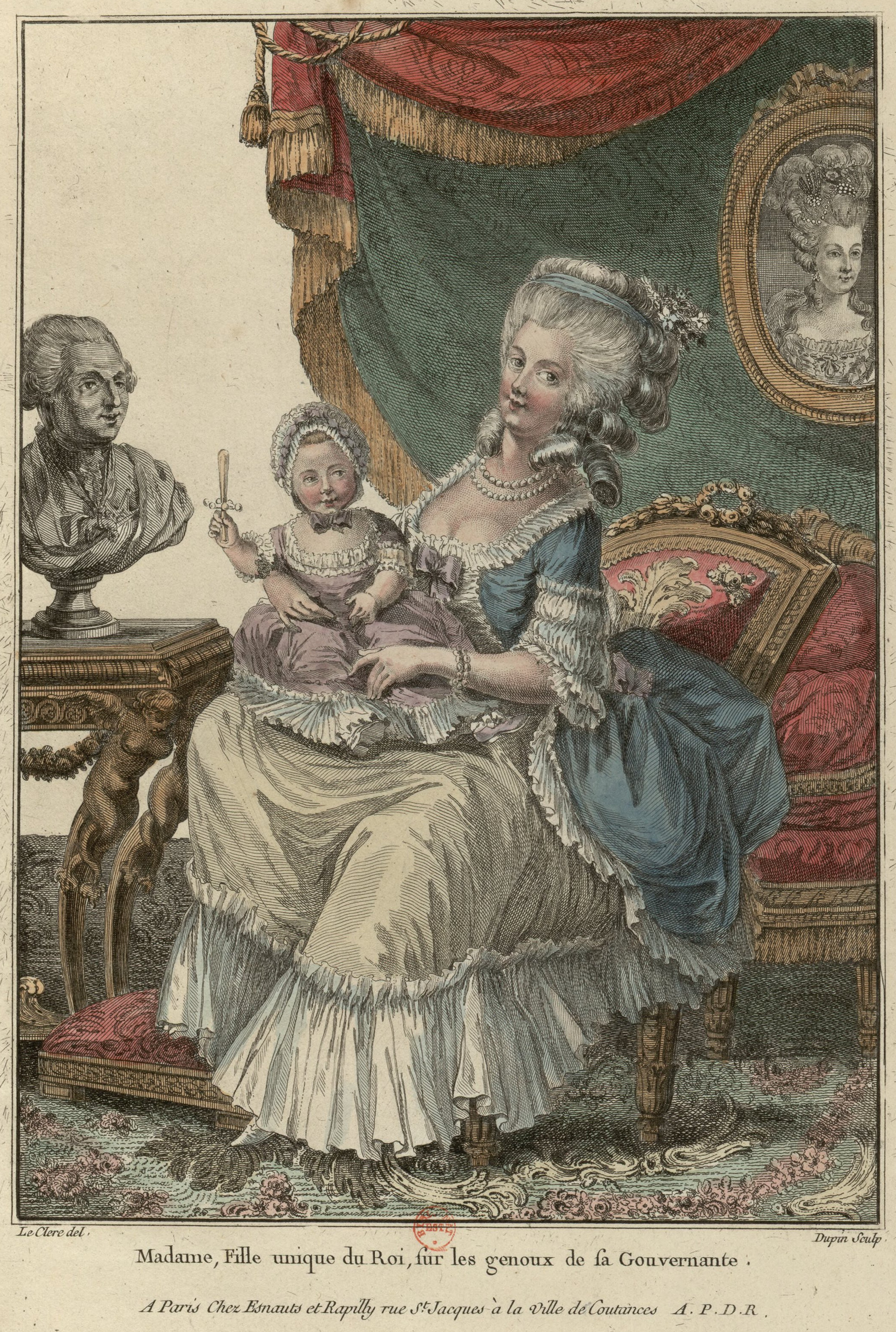
Victoire de Rohan with Madame Royale.

During her tenure as royal governess, she was in accordance with her position not allowed to leave court except with a written permission from the monarch, a permission she asked only to attend the parties of the Archbishop of Narbonne at Hautefontaine. She became an influential personal friend of Marie Antoinette, and was alleged to have had a bad influence upon her, mainly by introducing her to wasteful and expensive habits such as arranging illegal games with high stakes, particularly Pharaoh, which she introduced in her salon at Versailles, and the new English fashion of horse races, interests which made the Queen acquire huge debts.

She had a relationship with Augustin Gabriel de Franquetot de Coigny (1740–1817), the father of one of her charges, Aimée de Franquetot de Coigny, Duchesse de Fleury (1769–1820), muse of the poet André Chénier. The Prince of Guéméné, meanwhile, had an affair with Victoire's close friend, Thérèse-Lucy de Dillon, Comtesse de Dillon. Because of this, Abbot de Vermond reportedly reproached Marie Antoinette for keeping company with women of ill repute like Dillon and Guéméné. In 1776, Emperor Joseph, during his stay in France, chastised his sister Marie Antoinette for attending the salon of the Princess, which he called a gambling den.

She was described as intelligent and with an interest in spiritualism: "though endowed with considerable intellectual power, spent her time in pursuing the follies of spiritualism", and in possession of a large collection of famous jewels, which she seldom wore but regularly lent to others and were therefore frequently seen at formal occasions.

=== Later life ===
In 1782, Victoire was forced to resign her post due to a scandal created by her husband's mounting debt of 33 million livres, a debt that eventually, in 1787, led to the sale of the Hôtel de Rohan-Guémené. Marie Antoinette did secure a pension for Victoire for her service at court, but the couple was banned, and the friendship between the Queen and Victoire was discontinued.

After the bankruptcy, which was viewed as a scandal, the couple was ostracized from society, and Victoire took residence in a palace provided by her father; she was regarded to bear the scandal with dignity.

Victoire and her spouse lived to see the French Revolution in 1789, later fleeing to Austria. They eventually settled in Bohemia, living at Sychrov Castle, and it was here that the Rohan family remained for 125 years.

Victoire died in Paris in September 1807 at the age of sixty-three. Her widower survived her by two years.

== Issue ==
- Charlotte Victoire Joséphe Henriette de Rohan (17 November 1761 – 15 December 1771)
- Charles Alain Gabriel de Rohan, Duke of Montbazon, Rohan and Guéméné; Prince of Guéméné (Versailles, 18 January 1764 – Paris, 24 April 1836); married in 1781 Louise Aglae de Conflans d'Armentieres (1763 – 1819) and had issue.
- Marie Louise Joséphine de Rohan (13 April 1765 – Paris, 21 September 1839); married in 1780 her cousin, Charles Louis Gaspard de Rohan, Duke of Montbazon (1765 – 1843) and had issue.
- Louis Victor Meriadec de Rohan, Duke of Rohan and Bouillon (Paris, 20 July 1766 – Czech Republic, 10 December 1846); married in 1800 his niece, Berthe de Rohan (1782 – 1841) and had no issue.
- Jules Armand Louis de Rohan (Versailles, 20 October 1768 – Czech republic, 13 January 1836); married in 1800 the wealthy heiress, Princess Wilhelmine Catherine Frédérique Biron von Kurland, Duchess of Sagan (1781 – 1839) and had no issue.

== Ancestry ==
Ancestors of Victoire de Rohan

8. Hercule Mériadec, Duke of Rohan-Rohan
4. Jules, Prince of Soubise
9. Anne Geneviève de Lévis
2. Charles, Prince of Soubise
10. Louis de Melun, Prince of Epinoy
5. Anne Julie de Melun
11. Élisabeth Thérèse of Lorraine
1. Princess Victoire de Rohan
12. Emmanuel Philibert, Prince of Carignano
6. Victor Amadeus I, Prince of Carignano
13. Maria Angela Caterina d'Este
3. Princess Anne Thérèse of Savoy
14. Victor Amadeus II of Sardinia
7. Maria Vittoria di Savoia, Marquise of Susa
15. Jeanne Baptiste d'Albert de Luynes

== References and notes ==
Court offices
Preceded by The Countess of Marsan	Governess of the Children of France; 1776–1782	Succeeded by The Duchess of Polignac
