= Madame de Ventadour =

French office holder of the French Royal Court

Charlotte de La Motte Houdancourt
- Duchess of Ventadour
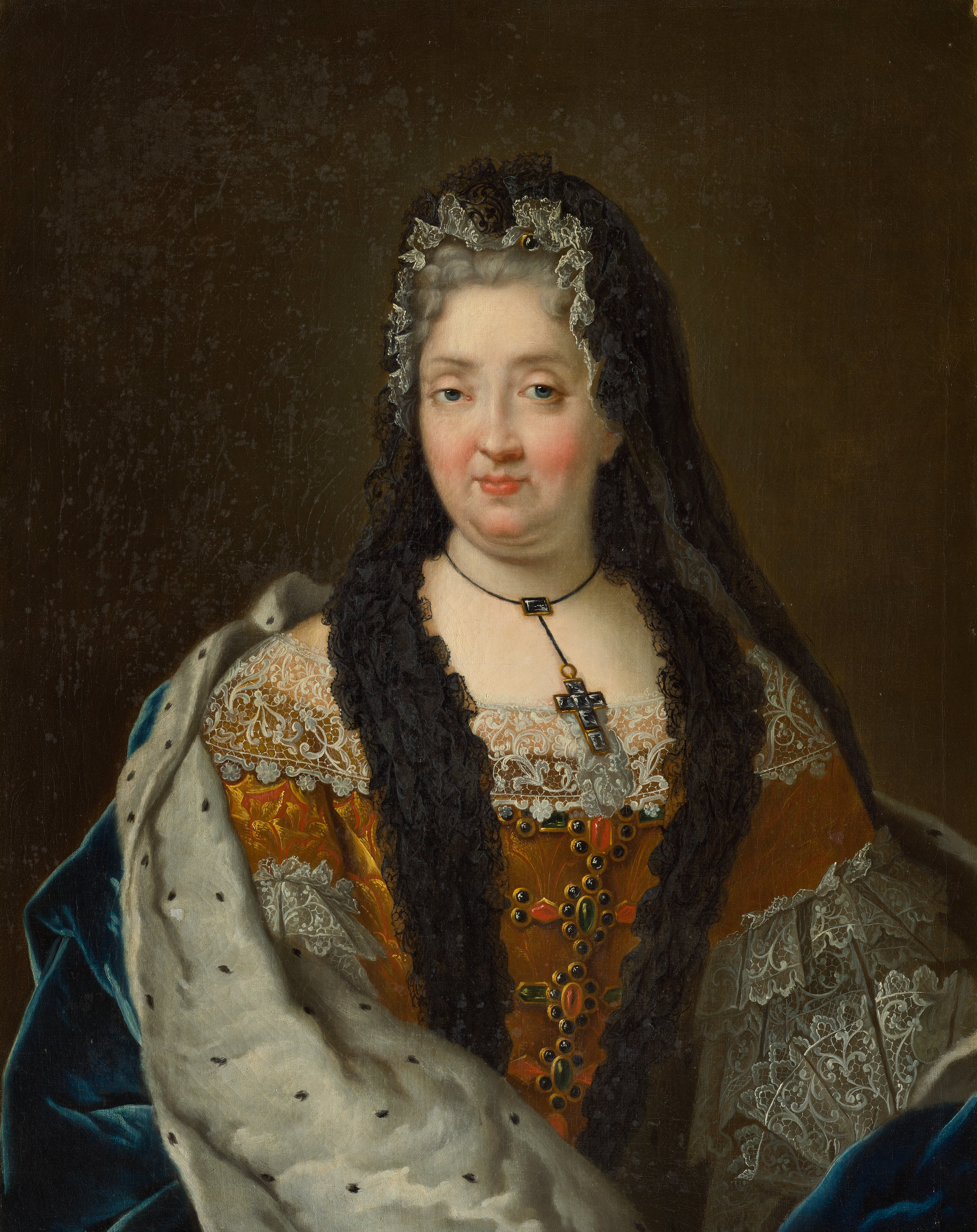
- Portrait by Pierre Mignard
- Born: 1654; France
- Died: 1744 (aged 89-90); France
- Spouses: Louis Charles de Lévis (m. 1671–1717); his death
- Issue: Anne Geneviève de Lévis
- Father: Philippe de La Mothe Houdancourt
- Mother: Louise de Prie

Charlotte de La Motte Houdancourt, Duchess of Ventadour (Charlotte Eléonore Madeleine; 1654–1744) was a French office holder of the French Royal Court. She was the governess of King Louis XV, great-grandson of King Louis XIV. She is credited with saving Louis XV from the ministrations of the royal doctors when he was ill as a child. She was the Gouvernante des enfants royaux, Governess of the Children of France like her mother, granddaughter, granddaughter in law and great grand daughter.

== Early life and marriage ==
Charlotte was the youngest of the three daughters of Philippe de La Mothe Houdancourt, Duke of Cardona and maréchal de France (d. 1657), and Louise de Prie, Marquise of Toucy, Duchess of La Motte Houdancourt, maréchale, governess to the children of France. Charlotte's sisters were:

- Françoise Angélique de La Mothe Houdancourt, Dame of Fayel (b. 1650), who married on 28 November 1669 Louis Marie Victor, duc d'Aumont (9 December 1632 - 5 April 1711).
- Marie Isabelle Angélique de La Mothe-Houdancourt, Duchess of La Ferté Senneterre (d. 1726).

Charlotte married Louis Charles de Lévis, Duke of Ventadour and governor of the Limousin (1647–1717), on 14 March 1671 in Paris.

The duke was generally considered "horrific"—very ugly, physically deformed, and sexually debauched—yet the privileges of being a duchess compensated for the unfortunate match, e.g. le tabouret: In a letter to her daughter, Madame de Sévigné described an incident that took place at St. Germain during an audience with the Queen.

"… a lot of duchesses came in, including the beautiful and charming Duchess of Ventadour. There was a bit of a delay before they brought her the sacred stool. I turned to the Grand Master and I said, 'Oh, just give it to her. It certainly cost her enough,' and he agreed."

Charlotte and Louis Charles had one daughter, Anne Geneviève de Lévis, born in February 1673. After the birth of her daughter, Madame de Ventadour preferred to reside in Paris separated from her husband, and there were no more children. She eventually secured a new position at court.

== Career at the Royal Court ==
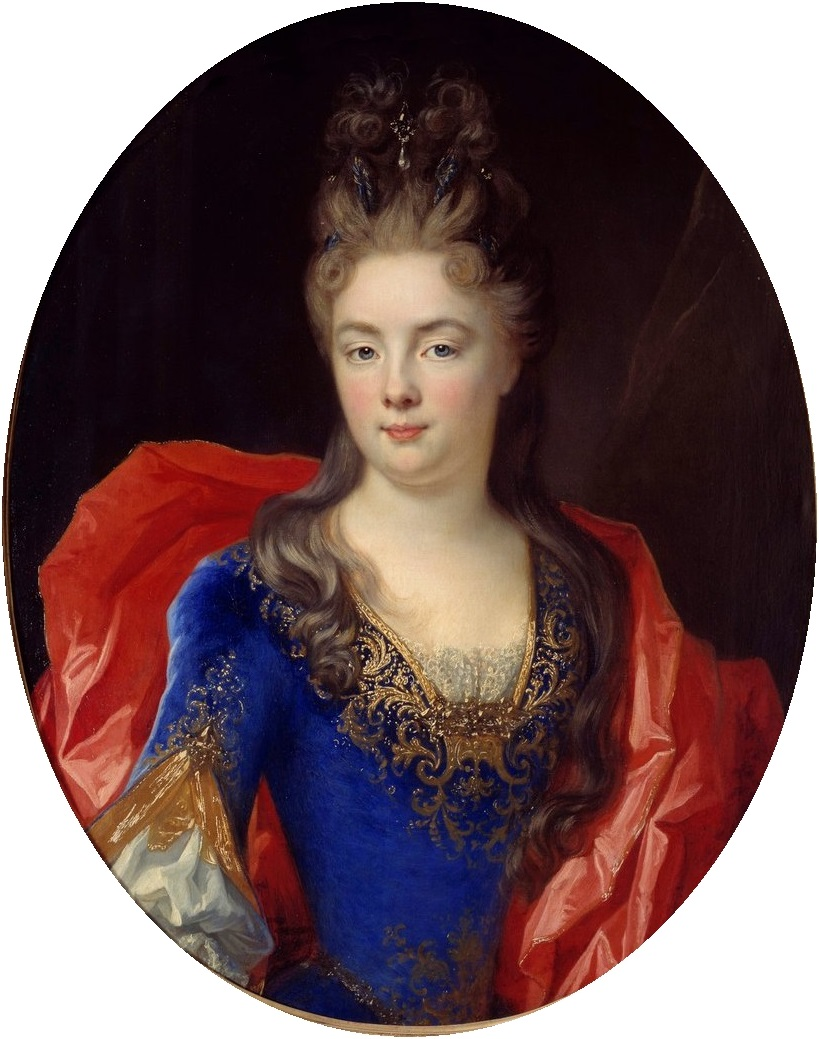
Her only child, Anne Genevieve de Levis, Nicolas de Largillière.

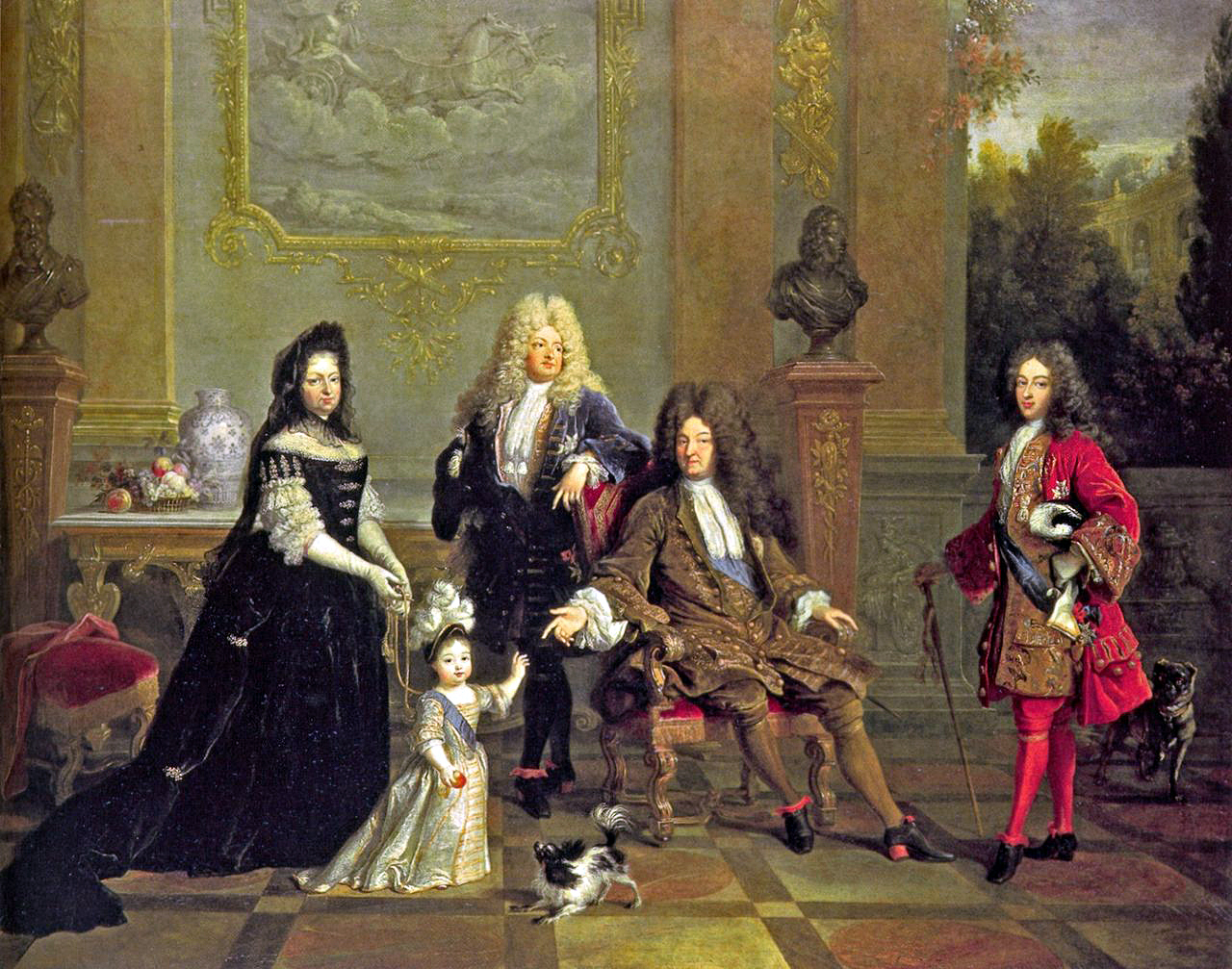
Madame de Ventadour with Portraits of Louis XIV and his Heirs (1715–1720) London, Wallace Collection A composite portrait of the Bourbon succession, made in the period 1715–1720. Louis XIV, surrounded by his heirs, gestures to his great-grandson, Louis, Duke of Anjou (the future King Louis XV), symbolising the older man's approval of his young heir. Madame de Ventadour, the young duke's governess (and the only non-royal in the painting) holds in her hands her charge's reins. Her presence references her role in "saving" the dynasty in the measles epidemic of 1712.

Madame de Ventadour lived the major part of her life at the Royal Court where she had a long career, serving in different positions at the Royal Court for over seventy years. Between 1660 and her marriage in 1671, she served as Fille d'honneur to the Queen.

A few years after her marriage she secured a new office at court and served as Dame d'honneur to the King's sister-in-law Elizabeth Charlotte, Madame Palatine, between 1684 and 1703. She was well-liked by Madame, who blamed Madame de Maintenon when Ventadour left her position in 1703.

Madame de Ventadour was appointed governess to the royal children in 1704. She served as deputy governess together with her sister Marie Isabelle Angélique de La Mothe-Houdancourt while her mother remain head governess in name. They were assisted by Anne Julie de Melun, Madame de La Lande and Marie-Suzanne de Valicourt. When her mother died in 1709, she was succeeded first by her eldest daughter and in 1710 by Madame de Ventadour.

In 1712, an outbreak of measles struck the French royal family, causing a number of significant deaths. First to die was the Dauphine, Marie Adélaïde of Savoy. Within a week of her death, her heartbroken husband, Louis the Dauphin, also died, leaving his sons Louis, Duke of Brittany, and Louis, Duke of Anjou, orphaned, and the elder son as heir to the throne.

The sickness, however, had not yet run its course: both the Duke of Brittany (now Dauphin) and the Duke of Anjou became ill with measles. The Dauphin was ministered to by the royal doctors, who bled him in the belief that it would help him to recover; instead, it merely weakened the young boy, who swiftly died, leaving the Duke of Anjou as Dauphin. Deciding that she would not allow the same treatment to be applied to the Duke of Anjou, Madame de Ventadour locked herself up with three nursery maids and refused to allow the doctors near the boy. Louis survived his disease, becoming King of France upon the death of his great-grandfather three years later.

Madame de Ventadour continued in her position as royal governess until 1717, when the boy king was deemed old enough to be raised by men. The king was turned over to a male governor, the François de Neufville, duc de Villeroy, who was the friend and reputed lover of Madame de Ventadour. Her husband died in the same year. She then resumed her place as Dame d'honneur of Elizabeth Charlotte of the Palatinate, Dowager Duchess of Orléans, widow of Philippe de France, Duke of Orléans, only sibling of Louis XIV.

In 1721, she was appointed to be the Royal Governess of the King's bride Mariana Victoria of Spain, who arrived in France at the age of three to be brought up as the future queen of France. As the Governess of the l'infante Reine ("Queen-Infanta") she served under Marie Anne de Bourbon. Her office was dissolved in 1725 when Mariana Victoria was sent back to Spain.

Between 1727 and 1735, she again served as Royal Governess, now for the children of her former charge Louis XV, whose twin daughters were born in 1727. She retired in favor of her granddaughter in 1735.

She died at the Château de Glatigny, her residence in Versailles. Through her daughter she is an ancestress of the Princes of Guéméné of the House of Rohan, who presently live in Austria.

== Issue ==
Anne Geneviève de Lévis Mademoiselle de Lévis, Princess of Turenne, Duchess of Rohan-Rohan, Princess of Maubuisson, Princess of Soubise (February 1673 – 20 March 1727)

1. Married Louis Charles de La Tour d'Auvergne, Prince of Turenne in 1692 (son of Godefroy Maurice de La Tour d'Auvergne and Marie Anne Mancini) had no issue;
2. Married Hercule Mériadec de Rohan, Duke of Rohan-Rohan in 1694 (son of François de Rohan and Anne de Rohan-Chabot, had issue.

== Bibliography ==
- Madame de Sévigné. Correspondance. Texte établi, présenté et annoté par Roger Duchêne. Paris: Bibliothèque de la Pléiade. 1973-78. 3 vol..

Court offices
Preceded by The Duchess of La Ferté-Senneterre	Governess of the Children of France; 1710–1735	Succeeded by The Duchess of Tallard
