= Hercule Mériadec, Duke of Rohan-Rohan =

French aristocrat

Hercule Mériadec de Rohan
- Duke of Rohan-Rohan; Prince of Soubise
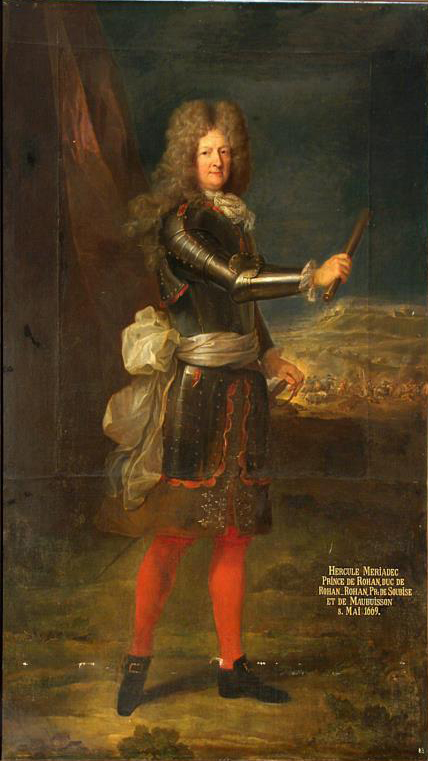
- Born: 8 May 1669; Paris, France
- Died: 26 January 1749 (aged 79); Rue de Paradis, Paris France
- Noble family: Rohan
- Spouses: Anne Geneviève de Lévis (m. 1694; died 1727) Marie Sophie de Courcillon (m. 1732)
- Issue Detail: Louise Françoise, Duchess of La Meilleraye; Charlotte Armande, Abbess of Jouarre; Jules, Prince of Soubise; Marie Isabelle, Duchess of Tallard; Louise, Princess of Guéméné
- Father: François de Rohan
- Mother: Anne Julie de Rohan

Hercule Mériadec de Rohan (8 May 1669 – 26 January 1749), styled Duke of Rohan-Rohan (from 1717), was a member of the princely House of Rohan. He married twice and was the grandfather of the Maréchal de Soubise. His first wife was the daughter of Madame de Ventadour. He is known in contemporary texts as the prince de Rohan.

== Biography ==
Born in Paris, he was the fourth of eleven children of François de Rohan and Anne Julie de Rohan, whose marriage gave rise to the Soubise line of the House of Rohan. His family claimed ancestry from the reigning Dukes of Brittany and at the French court were allowed the rank of Foreign Prince. This entitled them to the style of Highness and other privileges at court.

His mother was one-time mistress of Louis XIV. At the time, it was suspected that his younger brother Armand Gaston Maximilien de Rohan was in fact fathered by Louis XIV. Hercule Mériadec's mother bought the Lordship of Soubise to the family, styling themselves as Prince. Anne Julie herself was Princess of Soubise suo jure.

The second son, Hercule Mériadec, became heir apparent in 1689 at the death of his elder brother Louis, who died aged 22. He was styled Prince of Maubuisson (prince de Maubuisson) till 1714 when he was made the Duke of Rohan-Rohan (as opposed to the Duke of Rohan, the title held by his cousins).

He married twice, firstly to Anne Geneviève de Lévis, daughter of Louis Charles de Lévis and Charlotte de La Motte Houdancourt (better known as Madame de Ventadour, governess of the young Louis XV). Anne Geneviève had been widowed in 1692 having married Louis de La Tour d'Auvergne, son of Godefroy Maurice de La Tour d'Auvergne and Marie Anne Mancini. He died in battle and she and Hercule Mériadec were married in Paris on 15 February 1694.

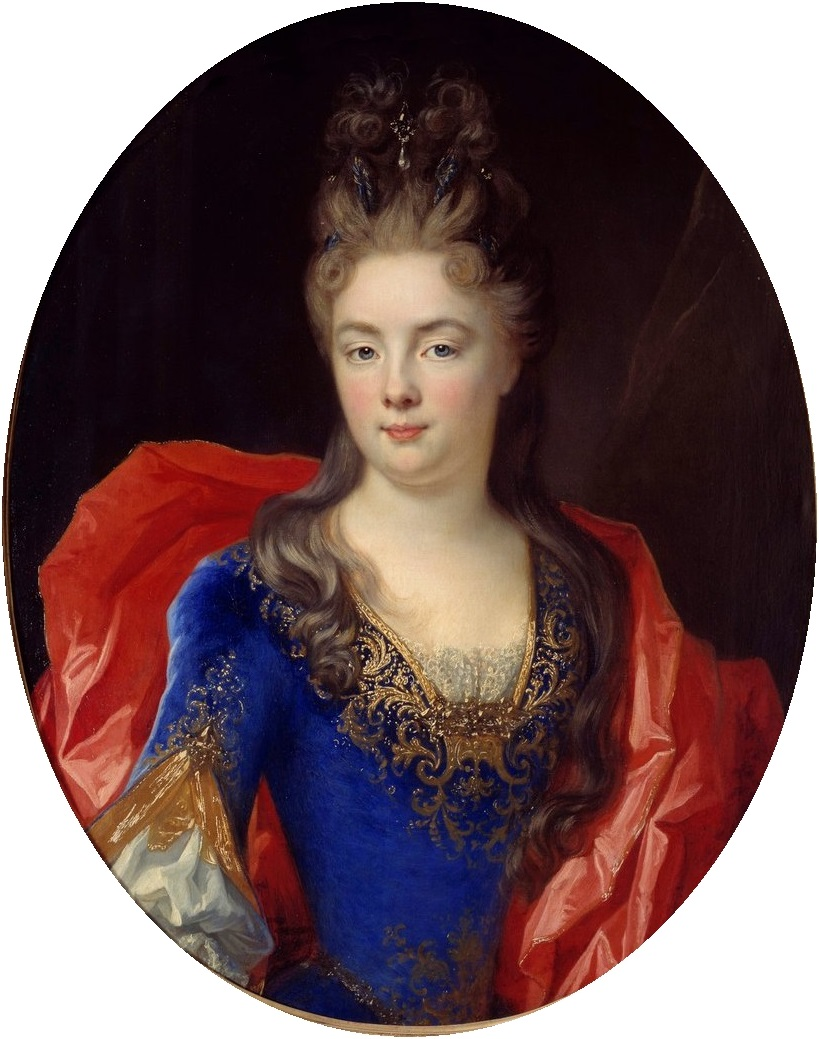
His first wife (by Largillière)

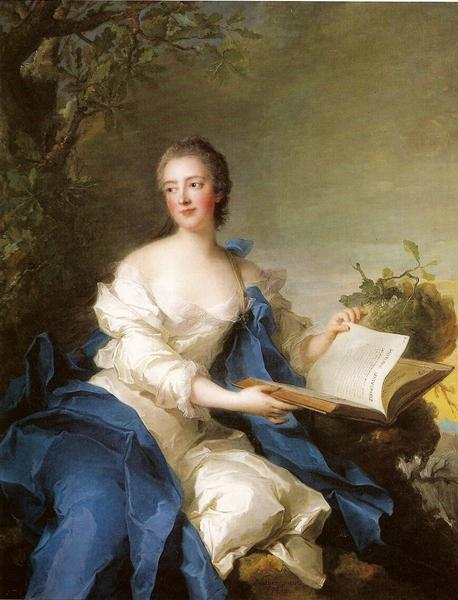
His second wife (by Nattier)

The marriage produced five children, three of whom would have progeny. He lost her only son Jules to smallpox in 1724 as well as his daughter in law Anne Julie de Melun. His grandson Charles, Prince of Soubise, was born in 1710 and after the death of his parents, was raised by Hercule Mériadec himself to become a man of the court. Charles was later a great friend of Louis XV and the great-grandfather of the murdered Duke of Enghien through his eldest daughter Charlotte. His second daughter Charlotte Armande succeeded her aunt Anne Marguerite de Rohan as Abbess of Jouarre in 1721.

Hercule Mériadec was responsible for some interior décor at the Hôtel de Soubise engaging Germain Boffrand in the process. This dates from 1730 to 1740.

He outlived his wife by 22 years; Anne Geneviève died in March 1727. The widowed Hercule Mériadec remarried on 2 September 1732 to Marie Sophie de Courcillon who was born in 1713 and had been a mistress of the famous womaniser Louis François Armand de Vignerot du Plessis. Marie Sophie was the daughter of Philippe Egon de Courcillon and Françoise de Pompadour, Duchesse de La Valette. She was also the granddaughter of Philippe de Courcillon, marquis de Dangeau, and Princess Sophia of Löwenstein-Wertheim-Rochefort.

He died in Paris on the Rue de Paradis. His grandson, Charles succeeded him to the Rohan-Soubise titles.

== Issue ==
- Louise Françoise de Rohan (4 January 1695 – 27 July 1755) married Guy Jules Paul de La Porte Mazarin, grandson of Armand Charles de La Porte de La Meilleraye and Hortense Mancini; had issue and were grandparents of Louise d'Aumont, as such the present Prince of Monaco is a descendant of Hercule Mériadec;
- Charlotte Armande de Rohan, Abbess of Jouarre (19 January 1696 – 2 March 1733) never married; one son
- Jules François Louis de Rohan, Prince of Soubise (16 January 1697 – 6 May 1724) married Anne Julie de Melun, daughter of Louis de Melun and Élisabeth Thérèse de Lorraine, and had issue; died of smallpox;
- Marie Isabelle Gabrielle Angélique de Rohan (17 January 1699 – 15 January 1754) married Marie Joseph d'Hostun de La Baume-Tallard, Duke of Hostun, Duke of Tallard (son of Camille d'Hostun) and had no issue;
- Louise Gabrielle Julie de Rohan (11 August 1704 – Aft 12 March 1741) married Hercule Mériadec de Rohan, Prince of Guéméné, and had issue including the Prince of Guéméné.

== Ancestry ==
Ancestors of Hercule Mériadec, Duke of Rohan-Rohan

8. Louis VI de Rohan, Prince of Guéméné
4. Hercule de Rohan, Duke of Montbazon
9. Éléonore de Rohan
2. François de Rohan, Prince of Soubise
10. Claude de Bretagne, Count of Vertus,
5. Marie de Bretagne d'Avaugour
11. Catherine Fouquet de La Varenne
1. Hercule Mériadec de Rohan, Duke of Rohan-Rohan
12. Charles Chabot
6. Henri Chabot, Duke of Rohan
13. Henriette de Lur-Saluces
3. Anne de Rohan-Chabot, Princess of Soubise
14. Henri de Rohan, Duke of Rohan
7. Marguerite de Rohan
15. Marguerite de Béthune, Mademoiselle de Sully
