= Camille d'Hostun, duc de Tallard =

French nobleman, diplomat, and marshal

Camille d'Hostun
- Duke of Tallard
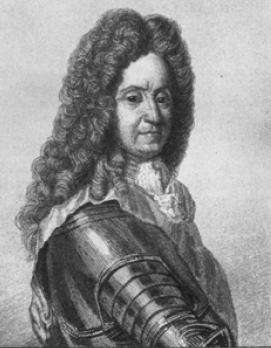
- Full name: Camille d'Hostun de la Baume
- Born: 14 February 1652; Dauphiné, France
- Died: 20 March 1728 (aged 76); Paris, France
- Spouse: Marie-Catherine de Grolée
- Military career
- Allegiance: Kingdom of France
- Rank: Marshal of France
- Wars: Nine Years' War; Battle of Landen; War of the Spanish Succession; Battle of Speyerbach; Battle of Blenheim
- Awards: Order of the Holy Spirit; Order of Saint Michael

Camille d'Hostun de la Baume, duc de Tallard (14 February 1652 – 20 March 1728) was a French nobleman, diplomat and military commander, who became a Marshal of France.

== Military career ==
Tallard was granted a commission in the French Royal Army at the age of 15. He later served under the prince de Condé in the Netherlands, and from 1674, under Turenne in Alsace. He was promoted maréchal de camp in 1678, and served in the Nine Years' War (1688–1697).

His friendship with King Louis XIV ensured a position of authority. After the war he served for two years as ambassador to the Court of St. James's, where his exceptional knowledge of European political affairs proved highly valuable. When King James II died in September 1701, King Louis recognised James's son as his successor to the throne of England. Consequently, King William III expelled Tallard from London in 1702.

Tallard's military career reached its height during the War of the Spanish Succession. On 7 September 1703 the Duke of Burgundy and Tallard took the town of Breisach. Tallard proceeded to attack Landau in mid October. A relief force under the Prince of Hesse-Kassel (or Hesse-Cassel) was roundly defeated by Tallard's force at the Battle of Speyerbach on 15 November. As a result, Landau fell two days later. Shortly after, Tallard was created Marshal of France.

In 1704, Tallard was sent to reinforce Maximilian II Emanuel's and Marshal Marsin's Franco-Bavarian army on the Danube, which was under threat from the Duke of Marlborough's and Prince Eugene's allied army. Tallard set out on 1 July from Strasbourg, but although the six day siege of Villingen proved abortive, (abandoned on 22 July), the French Marshal was able to bring 34,000 men through the Black Forest, reaching Ulm on 5 August.

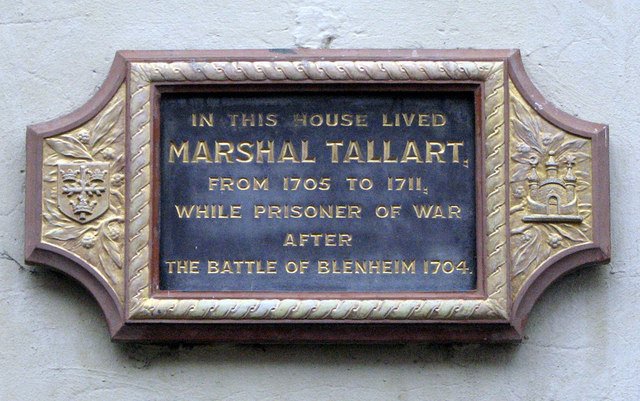
Plaque on Newdigate House

Tallard was placed in overall command of the combined Franco-Bavarian army, but the subsequent Battle of Blenheim on 13 August 1704 resulted in complete destruction of his forces. Decisively beaten, he was captured and taken back to England and housed on parole in Chatsworth, Derbyshire and Newdigate House Nottingham. The writer Daniel Defoe reported that his small, but beautiful parterre, after the French fashion was one of the beauties of Nottingham.

During his stay in Britain, he is credited with introducing celery to English cuisine.

== Later life ==
On his release in 1711 he returned to France. Despite the calamity of Blenheim, Louis appeared to bear the Marshal no ill will. Tallard was made a duke in 1712 and became a Peer of France in 1715. In King Louis XIV's testament, Tallard was appointed to the Council of Regency but the duc d'Orléans had the testament nullified. He was elected president of the Académie des Sciences in 1724 and, in 1726, he became a French minister of state. He died in 1728.

== Family ==
He married Marie-Catherine de Grolée de Viriville-La Tivolière and had one son;

1. Marie Joseph d'Hostun de La Baume-Tallard, Duke of Hostun, Duke of Tallart, (b.1683 - ?) he married Marie Isabelle de Rohan, daughter of Hercule Mériadec, Duke of Rohan-Rohan and Anne Geneviève de Lévis, daughter of Madame de Ventadour. The couple had no children; Marie Isabelle was the Governess to the children of Louis XV from 1735-1754.
