= Anne Geneviève de Lévis =

Anne Geneviève
- Duchess of Rohan-Rohan; Princess of Soubise; Princess of Turenne
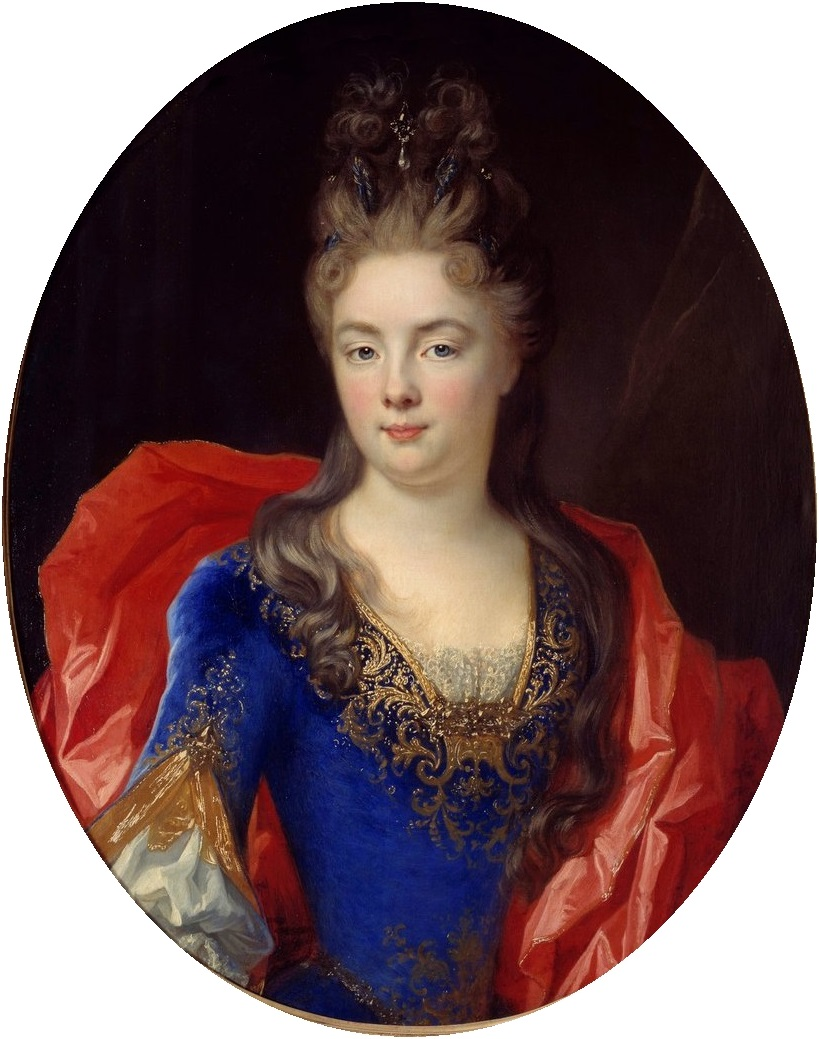
- Anne Geneviève by Nicolas de Largillière
- Born: February 1673
- Died: 20 March 1727 (aged 54); Rue de Paradis, Paris, France
- Burial: 23 March 1727; Église de La Merci, Paris
- Spouse: Hercule Mériadec de Rohan; Louis Charles de La Tour d'Auvergne
- Issue Detail: Louise Françoise, Duchess of La Meilleraye; Charlotte Armande, Abbess of Jouarre; Jules, Prince of Soubise; Marie Isabelle, Duchess of Tallard; Louise, Princess of Guéméné
- Anne Geneviève de Lévis
- House: House of Lévis (by birth); House of Rohan (by marriage); House of La Tour d'Auvergne (by marriage)
- Father: Louis Charles de Lévis
- Mother: Charlotte de La Motte Houdancourt

Anne Geneviève de Lévis (February 1673 – 20 March 1727) was a French noblewoman. She was Princess of Turenne by her first marriage and Duchess of Rohan-Rohan, Princess of Soubise by her second marriage. Anne Geneviève was the only child of Madame de Ventadour, governess of the young Louis XV. She married twice and had children with her second husband. She died in Paris aged 54.

== Biography ==
Anne Geneviève was the only child of Louis Charles de Lévis and his wife Charlotte de La Motte Houdancourt. Her parents had married in 1671 in Paris. Her father was the Duke of Ventadour and governor of the Limousin (1647–1717).

While unmarried, she was styled as Mademoiselle de Ventadour.

As she had no siblings, her father made her his heiress. He died in 1717 and she succeeded to his lands which passed to the House of Rohan. The Dukedom of Ventadour however was extinct.

In 1689, according to the memoirs of the marquis de Dangeau, Anne Geneviève was a proposed bride for Jacques Henri de Durfort (1670-1697), the son of Jacques Henri de Durfort (1625-1704) and Marguerite Félice de Lévis - the latter was Anne Geneviève's own paternal aunt making the proposed groom her first cousin. The marriage never materialised as Anne Geneviève's mother as well as grandmother Louise de Prie opposed the union.

She married twice; firstly to Louis Charles de La Tour d'Auvergne, styled the prince de Turenne and son and heir of Godefroy Maurice de La Tour d'Auvergne and one of the famous Mazarinettes, Marie Anne Mancini. The couple married in Paris on 16 February 1691. As the House of La Tour d'Auvergne ranked as Foreign princes at Versailles, this entitled them to the style of Highness. As such, Anne Geneviève took on this style.

As part of her dowry, she was given the Lordship of Roberval which went to the House of La Tour d'Auvergne.

The couple had no children as Louis was called to take part in the Battle of Steenkerque in 1692 and died having been injured. The young Princess of Turenne was a widow at the age of nineteen.

Secondly, she married into the House of Rohan. She married again on 15 February 1694 to Hercule Mériadec de Rohan, son of François de Rohan, Prince of Soubise and Anne Julie de Rohan, one time mistress of Louis XIV. As the Princes of the House of Rohan also held the rank of Foreign princes, Anne Geneviève was able to keep her style of Her Highness.

Her second marriage produced five children, three of which would have progeny. She lost her only son Jules to smallpox in 1724 as well as her daughter in law Anne Julie de Melun.

Her grandson, Charles, Prince of Soubise was born in 1710 and after the death of his parents, was raised by his grandfather Hercule Mériadec. Charles was later a great friend of Louis XV and the great-grandfather of the murdered Duke of Enghien through his eldest daughter Charlotte. Her second daughter Charlotte Armande was the Abbess of Jouarre. Charlotte Armande succeeded her aunt Anne Marguerite de Rohan as abbess in 1721.

She died in Paris on the Rue de Paradis. over the night of Friday 20/21 March 1727 She was buried on the 23rd at the Église de La Merci in the capital. Her husband married again in 1732 to Marie Sophie de Courcillon. Hercule Mériadec died in 1749.

== Issue ==
1. Louise Françoise de Rohan (4 January 1695 – 27 July 1755) married Guy Jules Paul de La Porte, Duke de La Meilleraye, grandson of Armand Charles de La Porte, Duke de La Meilleraye and Hortense Mancini; had issue and were great-grand parents of Louise d'Aumont, Duchess de Mazarin et de La Meilleraye, as such the current Prince of Monaco is a descendant of Anne Geneviève;
2. Charlotte Armande de Rohan, Abbess of Jouarre (19 January 1696 – 2 March 1733) never married and one son;
3. Jules François Louis de Rohan, Prince of Soubise (16 January 1697 – 6 May 1724) married Anne Julie de Melun, daughter of Louis de Melun and Élisabeth Thérèse de Lorraine, and had issue; died of Smallpox;
4. Marie Isabelle Gabrielle Angélique de Rohan (17 January 1699 – 15 January 1754) married Marie Joseph d'Hostun de La Baume, Duke of Hostun, Duke of Tallard (son of Camille d'Hostun), no issue; was the Governess of the Children of France;
5. Louise Gabrielle Julie de Rohan (11 August 1704 – Aft 12 March 1741) married Hercule Mériadec de Rohan, Prince of Guéméné, and had issue including the Prince of Guéméné.

== Ancestry ==
Ancestors of Anne Geneviève de Lévis

8. Anne de Lévis, Duke of Ventadour
4. Charles de Lévis, Duke of Ventadour
9. Marguerite de Montmorency
2. Louis Charles de Lévis, Duke of Ventadour
10. Jean François de La Guiche
5. Marie de La Guiche
11. Suzanne aux Epaules
1. Anne Geneviève de Lévis
12. Philippe de La Mothe-Houdancourt, Seigneur of La Mothe-Houdancourt
6. Philippe de La Mothe-Houdancourt, Duke of Cardona
13. Louise Charles du Plessis-Picquet
3. Charlotte de La Motte Houdancourt
14. Louis de Prie, Marquis of Toucy
7. Louise de Prie
15. Françoise de Saint-Gelais
