= Marie Sophie de Courcillon =

Marie Sophie
- Princess of Rohan; Duchess of Pecquigny
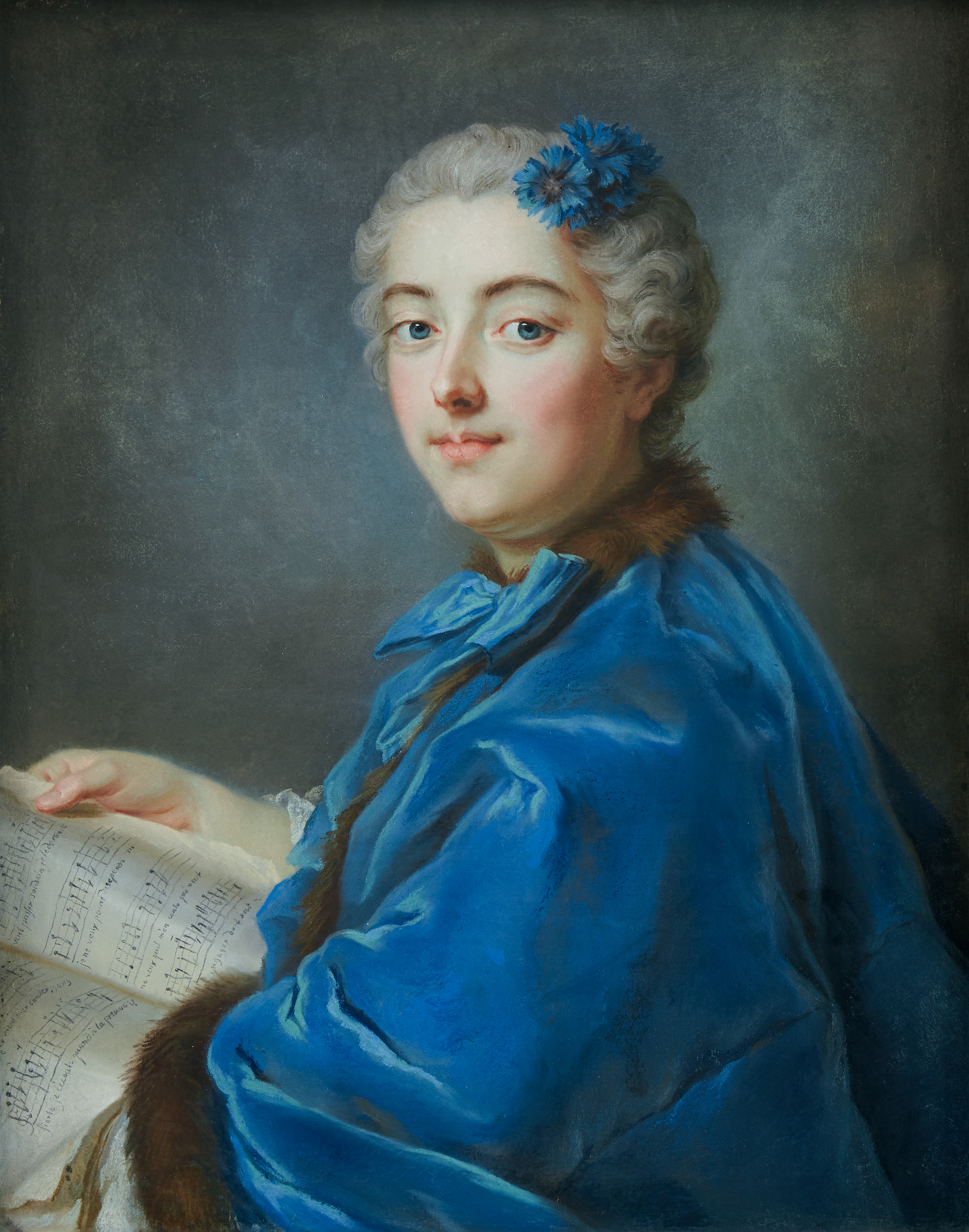
- Marie Sophie by Gustaf Lundberg c. 1740
- Born: 6 August 1713; France
- Died: 4 April 1756 (aged 42); Paris, France
- Burial: Église de La Merci, Paris
- Spouse: Hercule Mériadec de Rohan; Charles François d'Albert d'Ailly
Names
- Marie Sophie de Courcillon
- Father: Philippe Egon de Corcillon
- Mother: Françoise de Pompadour

Marie Sophie de Courcillon (6 August 1713 – 4 April 1756) was a French salonnière, Duchess of Rohan-Rohan and Princess of Soubise by marriage. She was the granddaughter of Philippe de Courcillon, better known as the marquis de Dangeau. She was praised for being a cultured woman for the age and held a fashionable salon at the Hôtel de Soubise in Paris. She was painted by Nattier.

== Biography ==
Marie Sophie was the only child of Philippe Egon de Courcillon (1684–1709) styled as the marquis de Courcillon and his wife Françoise de Pompadour, Duchess of La Valette. Her paternal grandfather was Philippe de Courcillon, the famous marquis de Dangeau and memoir writer of the court of Louis XIV.

Through her paternal grandmother, Countess Sophia Marie Wilhelmine of Löwenstein-Wertheim-Rochefort, she was a cousin of the ruling Princes of Löwenstein-Wertheim-Rochefort, originally a county of the Holy Roman Empire. Another first cousin was Ernest Leopold, Landgrave of Hesse-Rotenburg.

Her first cousins included Charles Philippe d'Albert de Luynes, Duke of Luynes; she was a second cousin Charles Louis d'Albert de Luynes another famous memoir writer of the court of Louis XV.

Mademoiselle de Courcillon was married twice. Firstly to Charles François d'Albert d'Ailly, son of Louis Auguste d'Albert de Luynes and Marie Anne Romaine de Beaumanoir. The couple married on 17 January 1729. She was thus known as the Duchess of Pecquigny.

The couple had a daughter who died young and little information exists. Soon after, Louis Auguste himself died and Marie Sophie was a widow at the age of 17.

Her second husband was Hercule Mériadec de Rohan, Duke of Rohan-Rohan, son of François de Rohan, Prince de Soubise and the beautiful Anne de Rohan-Chabot. Hercule Mériadec was a widower, his first wife Anne Geneviève de Lévis dying in 1727. The couple were married in Paris on 2 September 1732.

The duke of Rohan-Rohan was a member of the House of Rohan and had the prestigious rank of Foreign Princes at Versailles. This entitled Marie Sophie, styled as the "Princess of Rohan" (Madame la princesse de Rohan) the style of Highness.

The bride was 44 years younger than the groom; Marie Sophie was closer to her daughter-in-law the Princess of Guéméné (1704–1780).

To celebrate the union, her husband commissioned Germain Boffrand to redecorate the interior of the Hôtel de Soubise, the Parisian townhouse of the Rohan's. She kept a fashionable salon at the hôtel.

In 1737, it was she who presented Anne Marie Louise de La Tour d'Auvergne to the court at Versailles. Anne Marie Louise was wife of Charles de Rohan, Prince of Soubise—grandson of Hercule Mériadec and his heir.

Her husband died in 1749 in Paris. She was the mistress of Duke de Richelieu, who lost his last wife, born Élisabeth Sophie de Lorraine in 1740. She died in Paris at the age of 42.

With her, the Courcillon family died out. She was buried on 7 April 1756 at the Église de La Merci in Paris, the traditional burial place of the Soubise line of the House of Rohan in the presence of her late husband's grandchildren and the Archbishop of Bordeaux, the Cardinal de Rohan.

== Ancestry ==
Ancestors of Marie Sophie de Courcillon

8. Louis de Courcillon
4. Philippe de Courcillon
9. Charlotte des Noues
2. Philippe Egon de Courcillon
10. Ferdinand Carolus, Count of Löwenstein-Wertheim-Rochefort
5. Princess Sophia of Löwenstein-Wertheim-Rochefort
11. Landgravine Anna Maria of Fürstenberg
1. Marie Sophie de Courcillon
3. Françoise de Pompadour, Duchess of La Valette
