= Armand Gaston Maximilien de Rohan =

French politician and Cardinal

His Eminence Armand de Rohan
- Cardinal, Bishop of Strasbourg
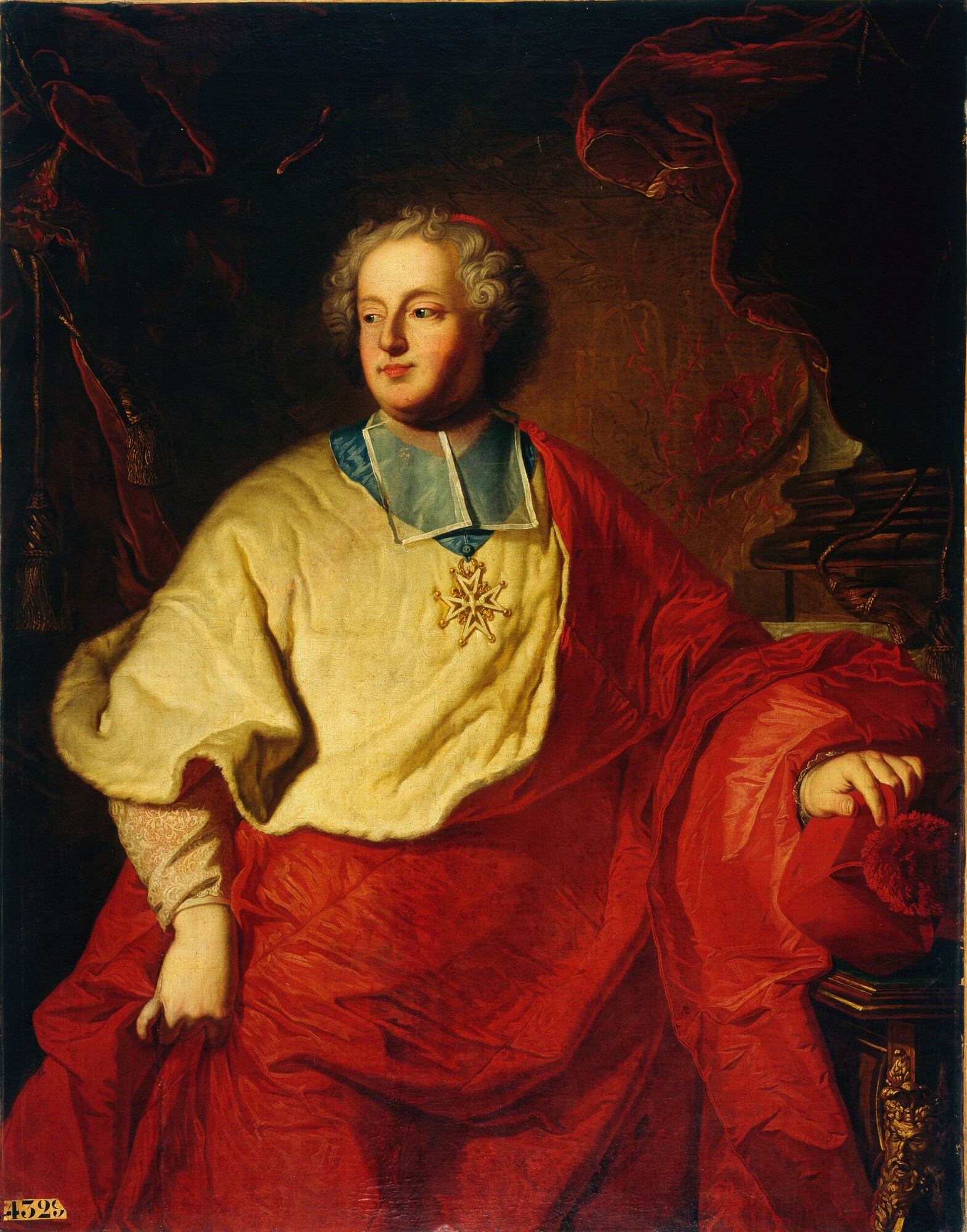
- Church: Roman Catholic Church
- Diocese: Strasbourg
- Installed: 9 April 1704
- Term ended: 19 July 1749
- Predecessor: Wilhelm Egon von Fürstenberg
- Successor: Cardinal de Soubise
- Other post: Cardinal-priest of Santissima Trinità al Monte Pincio
- Previous post: Coadjutor Bishop of Strasbourg 1701-1704 Titular Bishop of Tiberias 1701-1704

Orders
- Consecration: 26 June 1701 by Wilhelm Egon von Fürstenberg
- Created cardinal: 18 May 1712 by Pope Clement XI
- Rank: Cardinal-priest

Personal details
- Born: 24 June 1674 Paris, France
- Died: 19 July 1749 (aged 75) Paris, France

Armand de Rohan (Armand Gaston Maximilien; 26 June 1674 – 19 July 1749) was a French churchman and politician. He became Bishop of Strasbourg in 1704, Cardinal in 1712 then Grand Almoner of France in 1713 and member of the regency council in 1722.

He constructed the Hôtel de Rohan next to the present day Hôtel de Soubise in which his father lived, employing his father's architect, Pierre-Alexis Delamair. The prince de Rohan was elected a member of the Académie des Inscriptions in 1701 and of the Académie française in 1703. He was made a commander of the Saint-Esprit in 1713.

He gave last rites (confession, viaticum, and unction) to king Louis XIV.

== Family tree ==
Ancestors of Armand Gaston Maximilien de Rohan

16. Louis V de Rohan, Seigneur de Guéméné
8. Louis VI de Rohan, Prince of Guéméné
17. Marguerite de Laval
4. Hercule de Rohan, Duke of Montbazon
18. François de Rohan, Seigneur de Gié
9. Éléonore de Rohan
19. Catherine de Silly, Countess of Rochefort
2. François de Rohan, Prince of Soubise
20. Charles de Bretagne-Avaugour, Count of Vertus
10. Claude de Bretagne, Count of Vertus,
21. Philippine de Saint-Amadour, Vicomtesse of Guiguen
5. Marie de Bretagne d'Avaugour
22. Guillaume Fouquet, Marquis of La Varenne
11. Catherine Fouquet de La Varenne
23. Catherine Foussard de La Foussardière
1. Armand de Rohan
24. Léonor Chabot, Seigneur of Jarnac
12. Charles Chabot
25. Marguerite de Durfort
6. Henri Chabot, Duke of Rohan
26. Michel de Lur-Saluces
13. Henriette de Lur-Saluces
27. Marie Raguier d'Esternay
3. Anne de Rohan-Chabot, Princess of Soubise
28. René de Rohan, Viscount of Rohan
14. Henri de Rohan, Duke of Rohan
29. Catherine de Parthenay, Dame of Soubise
7. Marguerite de Rohan
30. Maximilien de Béthune, Duke of Sully
15. Marguerite de Béthune, Mademoiselle de Sully
31. Rachel de Cochefilet

== See also ==
- Palais Rohan

== Bibliography ==
- Claude Muller, Le siècle des Rohan : une dynastie de cardinaux en Alsace au XVIII|e, La Nuée Bleue, Strasbourg, 2006, 446 p. ISBN 2-7165-0652-3

Catholic Church titles
Preceded by Wilhelm Egon von Fürstenberg	Bishop of Strasbourg; 1704-1749	Succeeded by Armand de Rohan-Soubise
