= Couziers =

- Commune
- Location of Couziers
- Location within France Location within Centre-Val de Loire
- Coordinates: 47°09′35″N 0°04′59″E
- Country: France
- Region: Centre-Val de Loire
- Department: Indre-et-Loire
- Arrondissement: Chinon
- Canton: Chinon

Government
  - Mayor (2020–2026): Martine Lincoln
- Area^{1}: 12.05 km^{2} (4.65 sq mi)
- Highest elevation: 115 m (377 ft)
- Lowest elevation: 29 m (95 ft)
- Population (2023): 121
  - Density: 10.0/km^{2} (26.0/sq mi)
- Time zone: UTC+01:00 (CET)
  - Summer (DST): UTC+02:00 (CEST)
- INSEE/Postal code: 37088 /37500
- ^{1} French Land Register data, which excludes lakes, ponds, glaciers > 1 km^{2} (0.386 sq mi or 247 acres) and river estuaries.

Couziers (French pronunciation: [kuzje]) is a commune in the Indre-et-Loire department in central France.

== Population ==
Historical population
Year	Pop.	±% p.a.
1968	127	—
1975	120	−0.81%
1982	100	−2.57%
1990	103	+0.37%
1999	102	−0.11%
2007	105	+0.36%
2012	123	+3.22%
2017	112	−1.86%
2023	121	+1.30%
Source: INSEE

== See also ==
- Communes of the Indre-et-Loire department
