= Duke of Rohan-Rohan =

== Duke of Rohan-Rohan ==
Picture	Name	Father	Birth	Marriage	Became Duke	Ceased to be Duke	Death	Spouse
	Hercule Mériadec, Duke of Rohan-Rohan	François, Prince of Soubise	8 May 1669	15 February 1694; 2 September 1732	14 December 1714; Dukedom created	26 January 1749		Anne Geneviève de Lévis; Marie Sophie de Courcillon
	Jules, Prince of Soubise	Hercule Mériadec, Duke of Rohan-Rohan	16 January 1697	16 September 1714	24 August 1712 grand father's death	6 May 1724		Anne Julie de Melun
	Charles, Prince of Soubise	Jules, Prince of Soubise	16 July 1715	23 December 1745; 29 December 1734; 6 November 1741	6 May 1724	4 July 1787 death		Anne Marie Louise de La Tour d'Auvergne; Anne Therese of Savoy; Victoria of Hesse-Rotenburg
Picture	Name	Father	Birth	Marriage	Became Duke	Ceased to be Duke	Death	Spouse
