= Princess Anna Theresa of Savoy =

Anne Thérèse
- Princess of Soubise
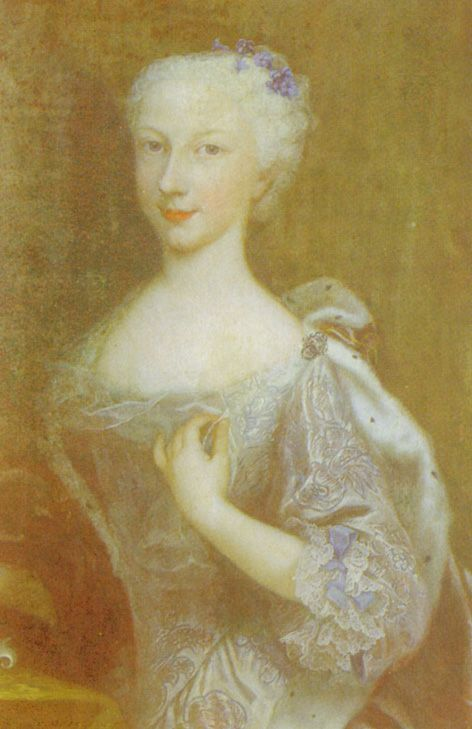
- Born: 1 November 1717; Hôtel de Soissons, Paris, France
- Died: 5 April 1745 (aged 27); Hôtel de Soubise, Paris, France
- Spouse: Charles de Rohan, Prince of Soubise (m. 1741)
- Issue Detail: Victoire, Duchess of Montbazon
Names
- Italian: Anna Teresa di Savoia; French: Anne Thérèse de Savoie
- House: Savoy-Carignano (by birth)
- Father: Victor Amadeus of Savoy, Prince of Carignano
- Mother: Maria Vittoria Francesca of Savoy

Anne Thérèse of Savoy (1 November 1717 – 5 April 1745) was a Savoyard princess born in Paris, France. She was the second wife of Charles de Rohan, Prince de Soubise, a military leader and friend of Louis XV, whom she was also his first half-cousin, sharing the same grandfather Victor Amadeus II of Sardinia.

== Biography ==
Born at the Parisian Hôtel de Soissons, she was a member of a cadet branch of the House of Savoy. Her father was the Prince di Carignano.

Through her mother, she was a granddaughter of the then king Victor Amadeus of Sicily. Her mother was Maria Vittoria Francesca, legittimata di Savoia, Marchesa di Susa, a legitimised daughter of Victor Amadeus II and his maîtresse-en-titre, Jeanne Baptiste d'Albert de Luynes.

She grew up in Paris, their parents fleeing the court of Savoy due to embarrassingly large debts. Their parents arrived in Paris during the regency of Philippe d'Orléans (1715–1723), regent of the Kingdom for the infant Louis XV.

Her husband to be was Charles de Rohan, the widower of Anne Marie Louise de La Tour d'Auvergne, a granddaughter of Marie Mancini. As head of the cadet branch of the House of Rohan, Charles bore the titles Prince de Soubise and Duke of Rohan-Rohan. He became a Marshal of France in 1758, and served as a minister to Louis XV and Louis XVI. Orphaned at the age of 9, he was a notorious libertine.

The couple married in the original (vieux) donjon of the château de Rohan in the town of Saverne on 6 November 1741. Presiding over the ceremony was the bridegroom's brother, Armand de Rohan, bishop of Strasbourg. Anne Thérèse had a step-daughter, Charlotte de Rohan, future wife of Louis Joseph de Bourbon, prince de Condé and grandmother of Louis Antoine Henri de Bourbon, Duke of Enghien, an émigré whose seizure and execution by personal order of Napoleon would shock Europe in 1804.

Anne Thérèse died in childbirth at the Hôtel de Soubise. In December 1745, her widowed husband married again; this time to Landgravine Anna Viktoria of Hesse-Rotenburg.

== Issue ==
Name	Portrait	Lifespan	Notes
Victoire Armande Josèphe de Rohan; Duchess de Montbazon		28 December 1743 – 20 September 1807	Born at the Hôtel de Soubise; married Henri de Rohan, Duke de Montbazon and had issue; was the governess of Madame Royale and Monsieur le Dauphin, children of Louis XVI and Marie Antoinette;

== Ancestry ==
Ancestors of Princess Anna Theresa of Savoy

8. Thomas Francis, Prince of Carignano
4. Emmanuel Philibert, Prince of Carignano
9. Marie, Countess of Soissons
2. Victor Amadeus I, Prince of Carignano
10. Borso d'Este
5. Maria Angelica Caterina d'Este
11. Ippolita d'Este
1. Anne Thérèse of Savoy
12. Charles Emmanuel II, Duke of Savoy
6. Victor Amadeus II of Sardinia
13. Marie Jeanne Baptiste of Savoy
3. Maria Vittoria, Marquise of Susa
14. Louis Charles d'Albert, Duke of Luynes
7. Jeanne Baptiste d'Albert de Luynes
15. Anne de Rohan
