= Louis Charles de Lévis =

French nobleman and Duke of Ventadour

Louis Charles
- Duke of Ventadour
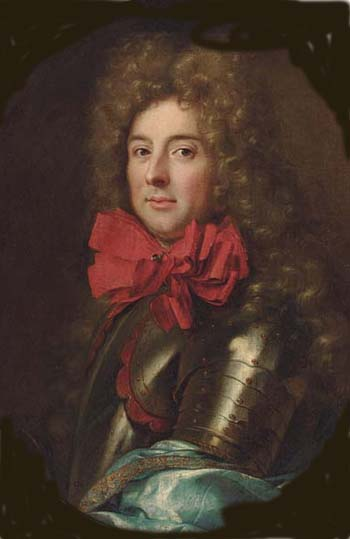
- Full name: Louis Charles de Lévis
- Born: 1647
- Died: 18 September 1717 (aged 69–70)
- Spouse: Charlotte de La Motte Houdancourt
- Issue Detail: Anne Geneviève, Duchess of Rohan-Rohan
- Father: Charles de Lévis
- Mother: Marie de La Guiche

Louis Charles de Lévis (1647 – 18 September 1717) was a French nobleman and Duke of Ventadour. His wife was the governess of the infant Louis XV and his only child Anne Geneviève made two prestigious marriages into contemporary nobility.

== Biography ==
The eldest of three children, his younger sister Marguerite Félice de Lévis (1648–1717) married Jacques Henri de Durfort de Duras and was the sister in law of the Maréchal de Lorges.

On his father's side, he was a relative of the wealthy Montmorency family. He married Charlotte de La Motte Houdancourt in Paris on 14 March 1671. She was the daughter of Philippe de La Mothe-Houdancourt and Louise de Prie.

The Duke was generally considered "horrific" — very ugly, physically deformed, and sexually debauched — yet the privileges of being a duchess compensated for the unfortunate match, e.g. le tabouret: In a letter to her daughter, Madame de Sévigné described an incident that took place at St. Germain during an audience with the Queen.

"… a lot of duchesses came in, including the beautiful and charming Duchess of Ventadour. There was a bit of a delay before they brought her the sacred stool. I turned to the Grand Master and I said, 'Oh, just give it to her. It certainly cost her enough,' and he agreed."

He and his wife had a daughter. Louis Charles died in 1717 during the Regency of Philippe d'Orléans.

His wife was a lady in waiting to Duchess of Orléans and guardian of the infant Louis XV.

== Issue ==
Anne Geneviève de Lévis, "Mademoiselle de Ventadour", Princess of Turenne, Duchess of Rohan-Rohan, Princess of Maubuisson, Princess of Soubise (February 1673 – 20 March 1727)

1. Married Louis Charles de La Tour d'Auvergne, Prince of Turenne in 1692 (son of Godefroy Maurice de La Tour d'Auvergne and Marie Anne Mancini) had no issue;
2. Married Hercule Mériadec de Rohan, Duke of Rohan-Rohan in 1694, son of François de Rohan and Anne de Rohan-Chabot, had issue.

== Ancestry ==
Ancestors of Louis Charles de Lévis

16. Gilbert de Lévis, Count of Ventadour
8. Gilbert de Lévis, Duke of Ventadour
17. Suzanne de Laire, Dame of La Motte-de-Grigny
4. Anne de Lévis, Duke of Ventadour
18. Anne de Montmorency, Duke of Montmorency
9. Catherine de Montmorency
19. Madeleine de Savoie
2. Charles de Lévis, Duke of Ventadour
20. Anne de Montmorency, Duke of Montmorency =18
10. Henri de Montmorency, Duke of Montmorency
21. Madeleine de Savoie =19
5. Marguerite de Montmorency
22. Robert IV de La Marck, Duke of Bouillon
11. Antoinette de La Marck
23. Françoise de Brézé, Countess of Maulevrier
1. Louis Charles de Lévis
24. Gabriel de La Guiche, Seigneur of Chaumont
12. Claude de La Guiche
25. Anne Soreau, Dame of Saint-Geran
6. Jean François de La Guiche
26. François d'Isserpent, Seigneur of Chitain
13. Suzanne d'Isserpent
27. Jacqueline de Chaugy, Dame of Lalière
3. Marie de La Guiche
28. Nicolas Aux Epaules, Seigneur of Sainte-Marie-du-Mont
14. Henri Robert Aux Epaules, Seigneur of Sainte-Marie-du-Mont
29. Jeanne Françoise de Monchy
7. Suzanne Aux Epaules
30. Nicolas de Bours, Seigneur of Gennes
15. Jeanne de Bours, Dame of Gennes
31. Antoinette de Chepoy
