= Henri Chabot =

French nobleman, Duke of Rohan

Henri de Chabot
- Born: 1616
- Died: 1655 (aged 38–39)
- Other name: Henri Chabot
- Citizenship: French
- Occupation: Duke of Rohan
- Spouse: Marguerite de Rohan
- Children: 6
- Parents: Charles Chabot (father); Henriette de Lur-Saluces (mother)

Henri Chabot (English: /ʃæˈboʊ/ sha-BOH, French: [ɑ̃ʁi ʃabo]; 1616 – 27 February 1655) was a French nobleman and Duke of Rohan (first by marriage and then in his own right). His wife was the heiress Marguerite de Rohan, daughter of Henri, Duke of Rohan. He is also known as Henri de Chabot.

== Biography ==
Henri was the son of Charles de Chabot, Seigneur de Saint-Gelais and Henriette de Lur-Saluces. He was the Seigneur of Saint-Aulaye. His great-grandfather was Guy I de Chabot, a member of old Poitevin nobility, Baron of Jarnac, whose unexpected success in a 1547 duel passed into the French language as the "coup de Jarnac".

On 6 June 1645, Henri married Marguerite de Rohan, sole heiress of the Duke of Rohan and member of the powerful House of Rohan which claimed descent from the old Dukes of Brittany. The couple had six children, three of whom would have further children.

== Issue ==
- X de Rohan-Chabot
- Marguerite Gabrielle Charlotte de Rohan-Chabot (d.17 June 1720) - married Malo de Coëtquen, Marquis de Coëtquen and had issue;
- Anne Julie de Rohan-Chabot (1648 – 4 February 1709), Princess of Soubise - married Prince François de Rohan-Soubise and had issue; was mistress of Louis XIV;
- Gilone de Rohan-Chabot - (?) died in infancy;
- Louis de Rohan-Chabot, Duke of Rohan, Prince of Léon (3 November 1652 – 17 August 1727) - married Marie Elisabeth du Bec-Crespin de Grimaldi and had issue;
- Jeanne Pelagie de Rohan-Chabot (d.18 August 1698) - married Alexandre Guillaume de Melun, Prince of Epinoy and had issue; was grandmother of Anne Julie de Melun, Princess of Soubise (wife of Jules de Rohan).
