= Charlotte de Rohan =

- Princess of Condé
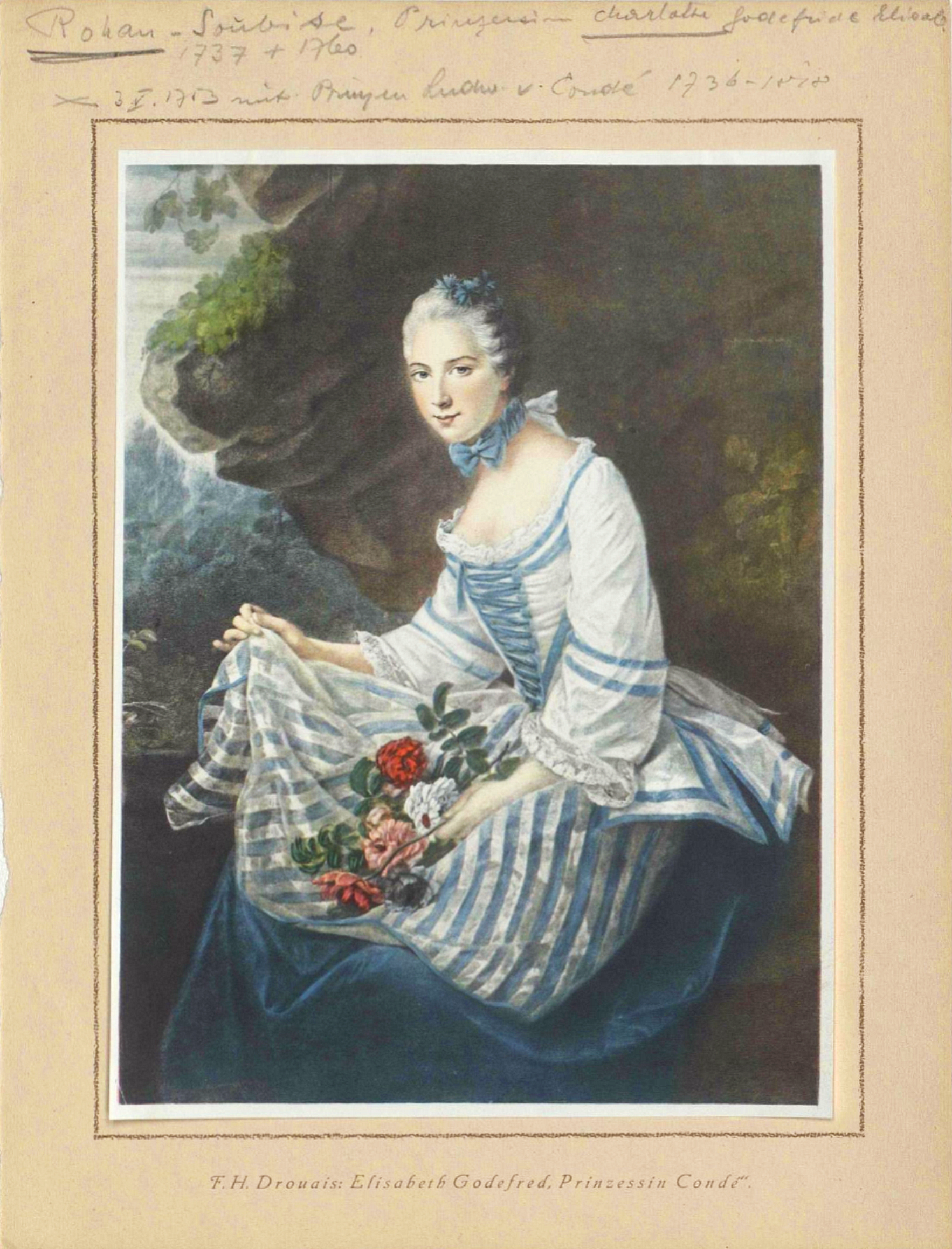
- Madame la Princesse de Condé in a portrait by François-Hubert Drouais
- Born: 7 October 1737; Hôtel de Soubise, Paris, France
- Died: 4 March 1760 (aged 22); Hôtel de Condé, Paris, France
- Burial: Carmel du faubourg Saint-Jacques, Paris, France
- Spouse: Louis Joseph, Prince of Condé (m. 1753)
- Issue Detail: Louis Henri, Prince of Condé; Louise Adélaïde, Abbess of Remiremont
Names
- Charlotte Godefride Élisabeth de Rohan
- Father: Charles de Rohan
- Mother: Anne Marie Louise de La Tour d'Auvergne
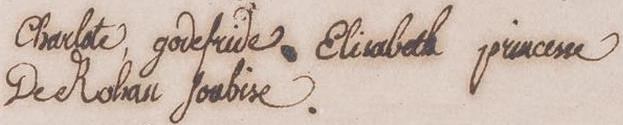
- Signature

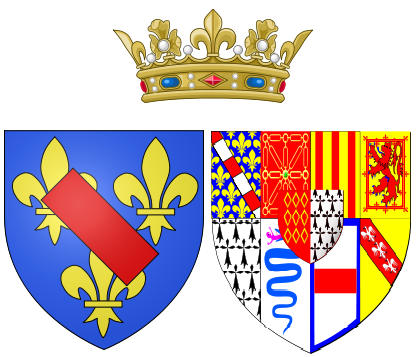

Charlotte de Rohan (Charlotte-Godefride-Élisabeth de Rohan-Soubise; 7 October 1737 – 4 March 1760) was a French aristocrat who married into the House of Condé, a cadet branch of the ruling House of Bourbon, during the ancien régime. She was Princess of Condé by her marriage. She has no known descendants today as her grandson, the last Prince of Condé, died without children, and her daughter, the Abbess of Remiremont, remained childless. Charlotte was praised for being a cultured and attractive princess of her age.

== Early life ==
Charlotte-Godefride-Élisabeth de Rohan-Soubise was born on 7 October 1737 in Paris. Her parents were Charles de Rohan, Prince of Soubise, who was a close friend of Louis XV, and Anne-Marie-Louise de La Tour d'Auvergne, a granddaughter of Marie-Anne Mancini, one of the famous Mazarinettes. Through Marie-Anne Mancini, Charlotte was a cousin of both Prince Eugene of Savoy and Louis-Joseph de Bourbon, two famous generals of the reign of Louis XIV. Anne-Marie-Louise was also the great-great-granddaughter of Madame de Ventadour, the governess of Louis XV as a small child.

Charlotte was born at the hôtel de Soubise in Paris, the residence of the Rohan family in the fashionable Marais. She had a younger half-sister, Victoire-Armande-Josèphe de Rohan, who would later become the governess of the children of Louis XVI and Marie Antoinette, and who was also a cousin of the Queen's loyal friend, the Princess of Lamballe. As the House of Rohan claimed descent from the Dukes of Brittany, Charlotte and her family were accorded the rank of princes étrangers at court with the corresponding style of Highness.

In 1739, she was created Marchioness de Gordes and Countess of Moncha, both of which she received from her mother upon her death. In 1745, she was made Viscountess of Guignen in her own right. In her dowry, she was given the Lordship of Annonay, which she passed onto the Bourbons.

== Princess of Condé ==
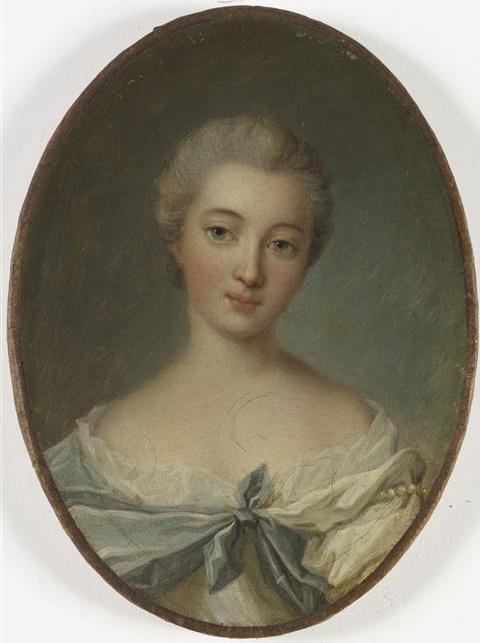
Charlotte de Rohan in a portrait miniature by Jean-Marie Ribou

Charlotte married Louis V Joseph, Prince of Condé, in a ceremony at the Palace of Versailles on 3 May 1753. Charlotte's father reportedly gave a dowry of 20 million livres. Louis-Joseph had been Prince of Condé since 1740 when, at the age of four, he lost his father, the previous Prince of Condé. His father, who used the title of Duke of Bourbon, had been the chief minister of Louis XV and had been instrumental in arranging the young King's marriage to the Polish princess Marie Leszczyńska. He was forty-eight at the time of his death.

Louis-Joseph's mother, the German princess Caroline of Hesse-Rheinfels-Rotenburg, died the next year in 1741 at the age of twenty-six. As a result, Louis-Joseph was an orphan and had been raised by his uncle the Count of Clermont. The new princesse de Condé was among the most important women at court, ranking behind Marie Leszczyńska and her eight daughters and the Duchess of Orléans and her daughter, Bathilde d'Orléans, who would later become her daughter-in-law.

Louis-Joseph possessed the rank of prince du sang at court with the corresponding style of Serene Highness, a style Charlotte assumed when she became Princess of Condé.

The couple had three children: a girl in 1755, a son and heir in 1756, and another daughter in 1758. Charlotte lived at the hôtel de Condé in Paris, the seat of the House of Condé.

== Death ==
It was at the hôtel de Condé that Charlotte died after a 'long illness' as reported by the Duke of Luynes. She was just twenty-two years old. She was buried at the couvent des Carmélites du faubourg Saint-Jacques. The official time for mourning for Charlotte began on 11 March.

Her husband went on to marry, in 1798, Maria Caterina Brignole, his lover and widow of Honoré III, Prince of Monaco.

== Children ==
1. Marie de Bourbon, Mademoiselle de Bourbon (16 February 1755 – 22 June 1759); died in childhood.
2. Louis-Henri, Prince of Condé (13 April 1756 – 30 August 1830); married Bathilde d'Orléans and had issue.
3. Louise-Adélaïde de Bourbon (5 October 1757 – 10 March 1824); died unmarried and had no issue.
