= Anne Marie Louise de La Tour d'Auvergne =

Anne Marie Louise
- Princess of Soubise
- Born: 1 August 1722; Hôtel de Bouillon, Paris, France
- Died: 19 September 1739 (aged 17); Hôtel de Soubise, Paris, France
- Burial: 29 September 1739; Église de La Merci, Paris
- Spouse: Charles de Rohan
- Issue Detail: Charlotte, Princess of Condé
Names
- Anne Marie Louise de La Tour d'Auvergne
- House: La Tour d'Auvergne
- Father: Emmanuel Théodose de La Tour d'Auvergne
- Mother: Anne Marie Christiane de Simiane

Anne Marie Louise de La Tour d'Auvergne (1 August 1722 – 19 September 1739) was a French noblewoman and the wife of Charles de Rohan. She was Marchioness of Gordes and Countess of Moncha in her own right as well as Princess of Soubise by marriage. She died aged seventeen in childbirth.

== Biography ==
Born at the Hôtel de Bouillon to Emmanuel Théodose de La Tour d'Auvergne, Duke of Bouillon and his third wife Anne Marie Christiane de Simiane, she was the couple's only child. Her mother died 8 August 1722, seven days after giving birth to Anne Marie.

Her father was a son of Godefroy Maurice de La Tour d'Auvergne, Duke of Bouillon and Marie Anne Mancini, the latter was a niece of Cardinal Mazarin and a famous salon hostess in her day.

Styled as Mademoiselle de Bouillon, she had been promised to Charles de Rohan since the age of eleven. The peerage was confiscated in 1789. He was seven years older than she and was the eldest son of Jules de Rohan, Prince of Soubise and Anne Julie de Melun.

In 1737, she was presented at court by Marie Sophie de Courcillon. Present at her presentation was the Duchess of Tallard, her husband’s great aunt and the Governess of the Children of France.

The couple were finally wed on 29 December 1734. She was just twelve years old. The couple had one child born in Paris in 1737 and baptised Charlotte Élisabeth Godefride. She was presented at court by her husband's relation, the Princess of Rohan. She was the Marchioness of Gordes and Countess of Moncha, both titles she passed onto her daughter at her death. Anne Marie Louise was the heiress of her maternal family, the Simianes who were from Provence and had been hereditary Counts of Moncha, the line ending with Anne Marie's mother.

Anne Marie Louise died in Paris at the Hôtel de Soubise at the age of seventeen having given birth to a son who was given the title comte de Saint-Pol; he died in 1742. Her husband went on to marry twice; secondly to Anne Thérèse de Savoie and then to Victoria of Hesse-Rotenburg.

She was buried at the Église de La Merci in Paris on 29 September 1739; the Église de La Merci was the traditional burial place of the Soubise line of the House of Rohan.

== Issue ==
- Charlotte Élisabeth Godefride de Rohan (7 October 1737 – 4 March 1760); married Louis Joseph, Prince of Condé and had issue. Duchess of Bourbon and Princess of Condé by marriage.
- Count of Saint Pol (September 1739 – May 1742); son who was not baptised: Anne Marie Louise died giving birth to him.

== Ancestry ==
Ancestors of Anne Marie Louise de La Tour d'Auvergne

8. Frédéric Maurice de La Tour d'Auvergne, Duke of Bouillon
4. Godefroy Maurice de La Tour d'Auvergne, Duke of Bouillon
9. Countess Eleonora van den Bergh
2. Emmanuel Théodose de La Tour d'Auvergne, Duke of Bouillon
10. Michele Lorenzo Mancini
5. Marie Anne Mancini
11. Girolama Mazzarini
1. Anne Marie Louise de La Tour d'Auvergne
12. Edmé Claude de Simiane, Count of Moncha
6. François Louis Claude Edmé de Simiane, Count of Moncha
13. Anne de Lignéville
3. Anne Marie Christiane de Simiane
14. François de Simiane, Marquis de Gordes
7. Anne Thérèse de Simiane
15. Anne d'Escoubleau
