= Élisabeth Thérèse of Lorraine, Princess of Epinoy =

Élisabeth of Lorraine
- Princess of Epinoy
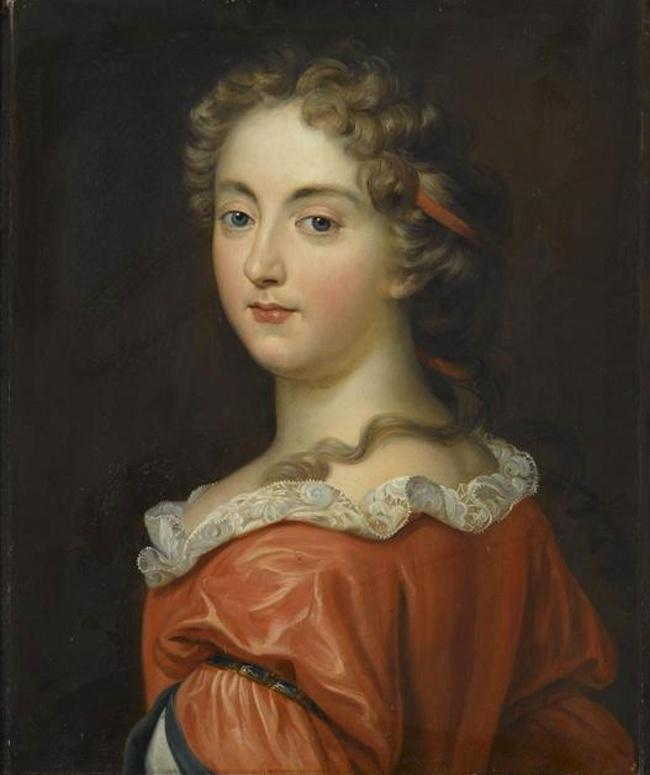
- Portrait after Etienne Achille Demahis
- Born: 4 May 1664; France
- Died: 7 March 1748 (aged 83); Hôtel de Mayenne, Paris, France
- Spouse: Louis de Melun, prince of Epinoy
- Issue Detail: Louis, Duke of Joyeuse; Anne Julie, Princess of Soubise
Names
- Élisabeth Thérèse de Lorraine
- House: Lorraine
- Father: François Marie de Lorraine
- Mother: Anne of Lorraine

Élisabeth of Lorraine (Élisabeth Thérèse; 5 April 1664 – 7 March 1748) was a French noblewoman and the Princess of Epinoy by marriage. She is often styled as the princesse de Lillebonne. She was the mother of Louis de Melun, Duke of Joyeuse and of Anne Julie de Melun, princesse de Soubise.

== Biography ==
A member of a cadet branch of the House of Guise, her father François Marie of Lorraine, Prince of Lillebonne was the youngest son of Charles II de Lorraine, Duke of Elbeuf and Catherine Henriette de Bourbon, a natural daughter of Henry IV of France and Gabrielle d'Estrées. Her mother, Anne of Lorraine (1639-1720), was her father's distant cousin and was the only daughter of Charles IV of Lorraine and his secret wife Béatrice de Cusance. The fifth of her parents' nine children, she was the only one of her siblings to marry or have children. She was styled Mademoiselle de Commercy at the French royal court, the princedom of Commercy being a subsidiary domain of the House of Lorraine.

She was a lady in waiting to Marie Anne de Bourbon, Princess of Conti (1666–1739), a legitimised daughter of Louis XIV.

She and her sister were said, by Saint-Simon, to be spies for Madame de Maintenon. While in the circle of the Grand Dauphin, she became close to his other half sister Louise Françoise de Bourbon known as Madame la Duchesse. She was also close to her uncle Charles Henri, Prince of Vaudémont and to Louis Joseph, Duke of Vendôme.

In 1721, at the death of her great-aunt, Marguerite Louise d'Orléans, Grand Duchess of Tuscany, Élisabeth Thérèse was designated her heiress, despite Marguerite Louise having allegedly promised that she would make her children her heirs.

She lost both her children in 1724: Louis, having secretly married Marie Anne de Bourbon (1697–1741), disappeared while at a ball at the Château de Chantilly in July. Anne Julie had died earlier from smallpox, leaving five young children.

She and her husband died on 7 March 1748 at the Hôtel de Mayenne. She was aged eighty-three.

Through her daughter, she is an ancestor of the present Duke of Montbazon of the House of Rohan.

== Title ==
Élisabeth Thérèse was the Duchess of Luxembourg-Saint-Pôl in her own right. She bought the duchy from Marie d'Orléans in 1705, and in 1724 she transferred it to her son, who died shortly after. It was later given to her daughter who passed it to her son Charles de Rohan.

== Marriage and issue ==
On 7 October 1691, Mademoiselle de Commercy married Louis de Melun, Prince of Epinoy and Duke of Joyeuse, who was nine years younger than his bride). The couple had two children, one son born in 1694 and a daughter born in 1698. Only the latter would have issue.

- Louis de Melun, Duke of Joyeuse (October 1694 – 31 July 1724) married first to Armande de La Tour d'Auvergne, no issue; married secondly to Marie Anne de Bourbon (1697–1741), no issue;
- Anne Julie de Melun (1698 – 18 May 1724) married Jules de Rohan, Prince of Soubise and had issue; was grandmother of Charlotte de Rohan, wife of Louis Joseph, Prince of Condé and.Victoire de Rohan.

== Ancestry ==
Ancestors of Élisabeth Thérèse of Lorraine, Princess of Epinoy

16. René de Lorraine, Marquis of Elbeuf
8. Charles de Lorraine, Duke of Elbeuf
17. Louise de Rieux
4. Charles de Lorraine, Duke of Elbeuf
18. Léonor Chabot, count of Charny
9. Marguerite de Chabot
19. Françoise de Longwy
2. François Marie de Lorraine, Prince de Lillebonne
20. Antoine de Bourbon, King of Navarre
10. Henry IV of France
21. Jeanne III of Navarre
5. Catherine Henriette de Bourbon, Légitimée de France
22. Antoine d'Estrées
11. Gabrielle d'Estrées
23. Françoise Babou de La Bourdaisière
1. Élisabeth Thérèse of Lorraine
24. Charles III, Duke of Lorraine
12. Francis II, Duke of Lorraine
25. Claude of Valois
6. Charles IV, Duke of Lorraine
26. Paul of Salm-Brandenburg
13. Christina of Salm
27. Marie Le Veneur de Tillières
3. Anne de Lorraine
28. Evandelin-Simon de Cusance
14. Claude-François de Cusance, Count of Champlitte
29. Béatrice de Vergy
7. Béatrice de Cusance
30. Jean de Witthem
15. Ernestine van Witthem
31. Maria Margaretha van Merode
