= Princess of Soubise =

Within the French nobility, "Princess of Soubise" was the title given to the wife of the Prince of Soubise. The title was established in 1667 when the sirerie of Soubise, Charente-Maritime was elevated to a principality.

The title was held by seven women, from Anne de Rohan-Chabot (1638-1709) to Viktoria of Hesse-Rheinfels-Rotenburg (1728-1792), with the title being extinguished upon the death of Charles (1715-1787).

Picture	Name	Father	Birth	Marriage	Became Princess	Ceased to be Princess	Death	Husband
	Anne de Rohan-Chabot	Henri Chabot (Chabot)	1638	17 April 1663	March 1667; Soubise raised to a principality	4 February 1709		François de Rohan, Prince of Soubise
	Anne Geneviève de Lévis	Louis Charles de Lévis, Duke of Ventadour (Lévis)	February 1673	15 February 1694	24 August 1712 husband's de facto accession	20 March 1727		Hercule Mériadec, Prince of Soubise, Duke of Rohan-Rohan
	Marie Sophie de Courcillon	Philippe Egon, Marquis of Courcillon (Courcillon)	6 August 1713	2 September 1732		26 January 1749 husband's death	4 April 1756	Hercule Mériadec, Prince of Soubise, Duke of Rohan-Rohan
	Anne Julie de Melun	Louis de Melun, Prince of Epinoy (Melun)	1698	16 September 1714		6 May 1724 husband's death	18 May 1724	Jules de Rohan, Prince of Soubise
	Anne Marie Louise de La Tour d'Auvergne	Emmanuel Théodose, Duke of Bouillon (La Tour d'Auvergne)	1 August 1722	29 December 1734		19 September 1739		Charles de Rohan, Prince of Soubise
	Princess Anne Thérèse of Savoy-Carignan	Victor Amadeus I, Prince of Carignan (Savoy)	1 November 1717	6 November 1741		5 April 1745		Charles de Rohan, Prince of Soubise
	Princess Viktoria of Hesse-Rheinfels-Rotenburg	Joseph, Hereditary Prince of Hesse-Rotenburg (Hesse)	25 February 1728	23 December 1745		4 July 1787 husband's death	1 July 1792	Charles de Rohan, Prince of Soubise

== See also ==
- Prince of Soubise
