= Hercule, Duke of Montbazon =

Duke of Montbazon (1568–1654)

Hercule de Rohan
- Duke of Montbazon
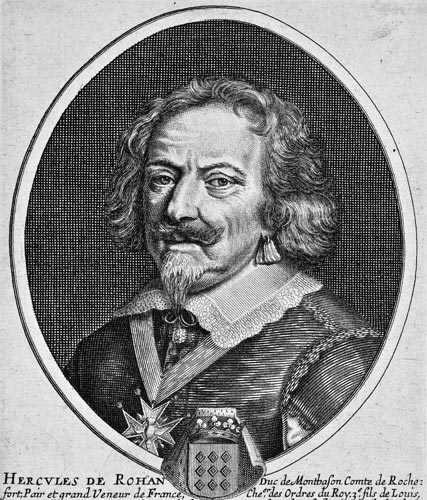
- Engraving by Pierre Daret (1610-1675)
- Born: 27 August 1568
- Died: 16 October 1654 (aged 86); Château de Couziers, France
- Buried: Rochefort-en-Yvelines, France
- Noble family: House of Rohan
- Spouses: Marie de Bretagne d'Avaugour; Madeleine de Lenoncourt
- Issue Detail: Louis, Prince of Guéméné; Marie, Duchess of Chevreuse; François, Prince of Soubise; Anne, Duchess of Luynes
- Father: Louis de Rohan
- Mother: Eléanore de Rohan

Hercule de Rohan (27 August 1568 – 16 October 1654) was a member of the princely House of Rohan. The second Duke of Montbazon, he is an ancestor of the present Princes of Guéméné. His daughter was the famous Frondeur the duchesse de Chevreuse. He was a Peer of France.

== Biography ==
Born the seventh of fourteen children of Louis de Rohan, prince de Guéméné and his wife Eléonore de Rohan, he was given the title of Count of Rochefort-en-Yvelines prior to becoming the Duke of Montbazon in 1589 at the death of his brother. He married twice; firstly to Madeleine de Lenoncourt, daughter of Henri de Lenoncourt, third of the name, and his wife Françoise de Laval, sister of the maréchal de Bois-Dauphin. Madeleine was the widow of his elder brother, Louis VII de Rohan-Guéméné. The couple were married on 24 October 1594 and had two children.

His first son Louis, was the Prince of Guéméné and thus the head of the surviving main line of the House of Rohan; his eldest daughter, Marie was later a woman of great personal charm who placed herself at the center of many of the intrigues of the first half of the 17th century in France. She married Charles d'Albert, Duke of Luynes, a favourite of King Louis XIII, and had issue.

Hercule's first wife Madeleine died in 1602. In 1628, he married Marie de Bretagne d'Avaugour, daughter of Claude de Bretagne, Count of Vertus and Catherine Fouquet de La Varenne.

His second wife was hailed as one of the most beautiful and most notorious women of her time. Hercule and Marie had three children, of whom two, François and Anne, would have progeny. François founded the Soubise line of the Rohan's and married his cousin Anne de Rohan-Chabot (later mistress of Louis XIV) and Anne, his youngest child married Louis Charles d'Albert de Luynes, her nephew by her older sister Marie.

Hercule served Henri III and his successor Henri IV against the Catholic League. He was lieutenant-general of Brittany and then later, the governor of Nantes; he became the latter in 1598. Henri IV made him governor of Paris and the Ile-de-France. He was also the master of the hounds.

Hercule was riding in the carriage with Henri IV when the king was assassinated by François Ravaillac on 14 May 1610. Hercule himself was wounded in the attack. Hercule commanded the funeral procession for Henri's heart. He died at the Château de Couziers eighty-six years old. He was buried at Rochefort-en-Yvelines in France, in local church's chapel called Chapel of princes.

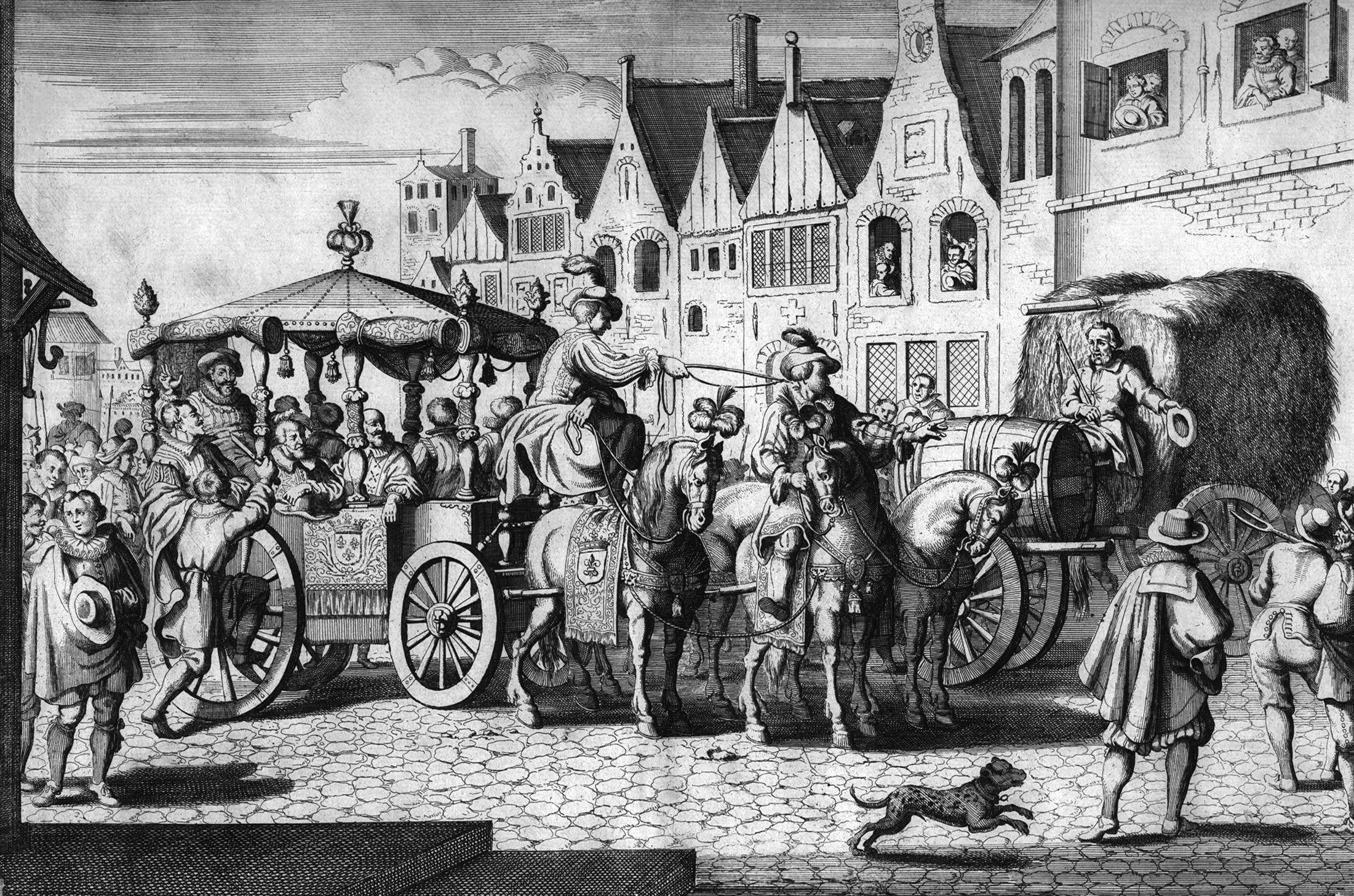
Assassination of Henry IV, engraving by Gaspar Bouttats

== Issue ==
Issue with first wife:

- Louis VIII, Prince of Guéméné, (5 August 1598 – 18 February 1667) married Anne de Rohan, heiress of Guéméné; present Princes of Guéméné descend from this line;
- Marie Aimée de Rohan, Mademoiselle de Montbazon (December 1600 – 12 August 1679) married Charles d'Albert de Luynes and had issue; married again to Claude de Lorraine, Duke of Chevreuse

Issue with second wife:

- Marie Eléonore de Rohan (1630 – 8 April 1682) died without issue;
- François de Rohan, Prince of Soubise (1630 – 24 August 1712) married Cathérine Lyonne and had no issue; married again to Anne de Rohan-Chabot, Princess of Soubise, and had issue; founder of the Soubise line of the House of Rohan;
- Anne de Rohan (1644 – 29 October 1684) married Louis Charles d'Albert de Luynes, mother of Jeanne Baptiste d'Albert de Luynes, mistress of Victor Amadeus II of Sardinia;
