= Anne de Rohan-Chabot =

French noblewoman (1648–1709)

- Princess of Soubise
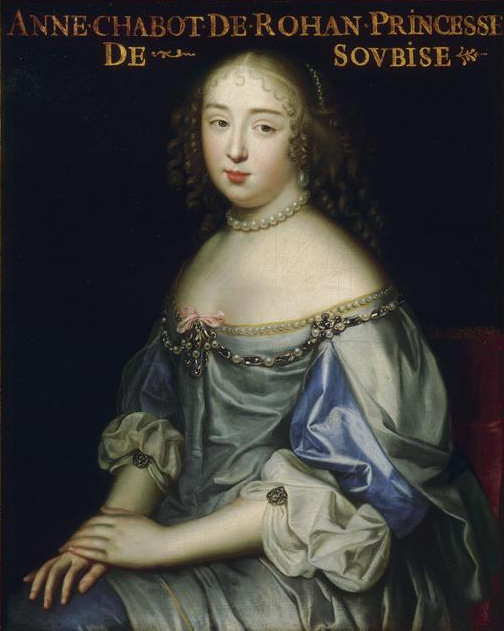
- Born: 1648
- Died: 4 February 1709 (aged 60–61); Hôtel de Soubise, Paris, France
- Spouse: François de Rohan
- Issue Detail: Hercule Mériadec, Duke of Rohan-Rohan; Armand, Cardinal de Soubise
Names
- Anne Julie de Rohan-Chabot
- House: Rohan
- Father: Henri Chabot
- Mother: Marguerite de Rohan

Anne Julie de Rohan-Chabot, Princess of Soubise (French: [an də ʁɔɑ̃ ʃabo]; 1648 – 4 February 1709) was a French noble. A member of the House of Rohan, she was wife of the Prince of Soubise. It was she who brought the lordship of Soubise into the junior line of the House of Rohan. She was for some time the mistress of Louis XIV. She was sometimes called Madame de Frontenay due to being the Dame of Frontenay.

== Biography ==
Born to Henri Chabot and his wife Marguerite de Rohan, she was the third of five children. Her parents' marriage had caused a scandal as Marguerite was a Foreign Princess as a member of the House of Rohan. This had obliged Louis XIV to issue a decree that she was able to marry Henri and still hold her high rank at court.

Her family were allowed to bear the name of Rohan-Chabot, the Rohans being her maternal family.

Her younger sister Jeanne Pelagie de Rohan-Chabot married the Prince of Epinoy, who was the paternal grandfather of Louis de Melun, Duke of Joyeuse, and Anne Julie de Melun - a future Princess of Soubise.

On 17 April 1663, at not more than fifteen years old, Anne married Lieutenant-General François de Rohan. François was a widower and the younger son of Hercule de Rohan, Duke of Montbazon, and his wife Marie de Bretagne d'Avaugour. His older half sister was Marie de Rohan, Duchess of Chevreuse, a key figure in the Fronde (also known as the Lorraine War) an event which had a profound influence on the spirit of the era. She was presented at court in 1665.

Anne was the Dame of Soubise in her own right. As such, at the time of her marriage she passed the title onto her husband. The couple styled themselves as the Prince and Princess of Soubise after March 1667 based on letters patent which raised the title of Soubise to a principality. Anne was also the Dame of Frontenay in her own right.

She received an above-average education for the time. Although only a teenager, she was reportedly devoted to her husband. Her physical features, including red hair, pale skin, and almond eyes, were considered especially beautiful by her contemporaries. Known as la Belle Florice, she maintained her beauty by keeping to a strict diet of chicken and salad, fruit, dairy products, and water with wine sometimes added.

Anne became Louis XIV's mistress in 1669 when he was staying at the Château de Chambord where Anne was also present. At the time, Louis' affections were split between Louise de La Vallière and her future successor Madame de Montespan. Some time later Anne gave birth to her second son, Hercule Mériadec de Rohan (future Prince of Soubise yet styled at birth as the Duke of Rohan-Rohan).

In January 1674 Anne became a Lady-in-waiting to Queen Marie Thérèse and five months later she gave birth to another son Armand Gaston Maximilien de Rohan. It was by then common knowledge that the King and Anne were lovers and it was commonly said that her son was really from Louis XIV and not Monsieur de Soubise although he acknowledged the baby as his son. Although nothing was proved, Louis XIV did allot a large sum of money to the compliant husband, "in consideration of his services." In the portraits of the time, the similarity between the king and Armand is obvious. Her husband quickly became wealthy.

The couple's affair ended in 1675 having been on and off for some six years. At the same time the relationship between Madame de Montespan and the King also came to an end.

She persuaded her husband to purchase the Hôtel de Guise from the trustees of the late Duchess of Guise. He bought the property on 27 March 1700 and renamed it the Hôtel de Soubise. She died there of a cold on 4 February 1709.

== Issue ==
- Anne Marguerite de Rohan, Abbess of Jouarre (5 August 1664 – 26 June 1721) no issue;
- Louis de Rohan, Prince of Rohan (11 March 1666 – 5 November 1689) no issue;
- Constance Émilie de Rohan (1667 – ?) married Don José Rodrigo da Camara, 2nd Count of Ribeira Grande (Portuguese nobleman) and had issue;
- Hercule Mériadec de Rohan, Prince of Maubuisson, Duke of Rohan-Rohan (8 May 1669 – 26 January 1749) married Anne Geneviève de Lévis, had issue; married Marie Sophie de Courcillon, no issue;
- Alexandre Mériadec de Rohan (19 July 1670 – 9 March 1687) no issue;
- Henri Louis de Rohan, Chevalier de Rohan (4 January 1672 – 30 July 1693) no issue;
- Armand Gaston Maximilien de Rohan, Cardinal de Soubise (26 June 1674 – 19 July 1749) Grand Almoner of France, suspected issue of Louis XIV, never married;
- Sophronie-Pélagie de Rohan (2 July 1678 – ?) married Don Alphonso Francisco de Vasconcellos, had issue;
- Éléonore Marie de Rohan, Abbess in Origny (25 August 1679 – 2 November 1753) no issue;
- Maximilien Gaston de Rohan (1680 – 23 May 1706) died in the Battle of Ramillies, no issue;
- Frédéric Paul Malo de Rohan (1682) no issue.

== Ancestry ==
Ancestors of Anne de Rohan-Chabot

8. Léonor Chabot
4. Charles Chabot
9. Marguerite de Durfort
2. Henri Chabot, Duke of Rohan
10. Michel de Lur-Saluces
5. Henriette de Lur-Saluces
11. Marie Raguier d'Esternay
1. Anne de Rohan-Chabot
12. René II, Viscount of Rohan
6. Henri de Rohan, Duke of Rohan
13. Catherine de Parthenay-L'Archeveque
3. Marguerite de Rohan, Duchess of Rohan, Princess of Léon
14. Maximilien de Béthune, Duke of Sully
7. Marguerite de Béthune, Mademoiselle de Sully
15. Rachel de Cochefilet
