= Anne Julie de Melun =

Undergoverness to the children of France

Anne Julie
- Princess of Soubise
- Full name: Anne Julie Adélaïde de Melun
- Born: 1698; France
- Died: 18 May 1724 (aged 25–26); Hôtel de Soubise, Paris, France
- Noble family: Melun (by birth); Rohan (by marriage)
- Spouse: Jules, Prince of Soubise (m. 1714; died 1724)
- Issue Detail: Charles, Prince of Soubise; Armand, Cardinal de Soubise; Marie Louise, Countess of Marsan
- Father: Louis de Melun
- Mother: Élisabeth Thérèse de Lorraine

Anne Julie de Melun (Anne Julie Adélaïde; 1698 – 18 May 1724) was a French court office holder. She served as deputy Governess of the Children of France.

== Biography ==
Born in 1698, she was baptised with the names Anne Julie Adélaïde and was known as Anne Julie. Born as the second of two children to Louis de Melun, Prince d'Epinoy, and his wife Élisabeth Thérèse de Lorraine, princesse de Lillebonne, and thus member of House of Melun. Her brother Louis de Melun disappeared in 1724, two months after her death.

She was the Lady of Boubers in her own right. The peerage was confiscated in 1789.

At the age of roughly fifteen, she married Jules, Prince of Soubise. The couple were wed in Paris on 16 September 1714. Her husband was a member of the Princely House of Rohan and with the marriage, Anne Julie took on the style of Her Highness.

She and her husband were second cousins. Anne Julie was an under governess to the children of France working with Madame de Ventadour, her husband's maternal grandmother.

The couple had five children in all, among them Charles de Rohan, Duke of Rohan-Rohan the famous general of Louis XV as well as Madame de Marsan. She and her husband died in Paris of smallpox. Her eldest son Charles succeeded as Prince of Soubise. Her brother's disappearance, led to the Principality of Epinoy (previously enjoyed by Anne Julie's father) was given to her son, Charles.

She died of smallpox in her twenties.

== Issue ==
- Charles de Rohan, Prince of Soubise, Duke of Rohan-Rohan (16 July 1715–4 July 1787) married Princess Anne Marie Louise de La Tour d'Auvergne (1722–1739) and had issue; married again to Princess Anna Teresa of Savoy (1717–1745) and had issue; married Princess Anna Viktoria of Hessen-Rheinfels-Rotenburg (1728–1792) no issue;
- François Armand Auguste de Rohan, Cardinal de Soubise, Prince of Tournon (1 December 1717–28 Juin 1758)
- Marie Louise Geneviève de Rohan (7 January 1720–4 March 1803) married Prince Gaston Jean Baptiste of Lorraine, Count of Marsan, no issue;
- François Auguste de Rohan, Count of Tournon (16 September 1721–6 August 1736) never married;
- René de Rohan, Abbot of Luxeuil (26 July 1723–7 February 1743) never married.

== Ancestry ==
Ancestors of Anne Julie de Melun

8. Guillaume de Melun, Prince of Epinoy
4. Alexandre Guillaume de Melun, Prince of Epinoy
9. Princesse Ernestine d'Arenberg
2.Louis de Melun, Prince of Epinoy
10. Henri Chabot, Duke of Rohan
5. Jeanne Pélagie de Rohan-Chabot, Lady of Montlieu
11. Marguerite de Rohan
1. Anne Julie de Melun
12. Charles II, Duke of Elbeuf
6. François Marie de Lorraine, Prince of Lillebonne
13. Catherine Henriette de Bourbon, Légitimée de France
3. Élisabeth Thérèse de Lorraine, Princess of Lillebonne
14. Charles IV, Duke of Lorraine
7. Anne de Lorraine
15. Béatrix de Cusance
