= Duke of Ventadour =

Coat of arms of the Duke of Ventadour

Duke of Ventadour (Fr.: duc de Ventadour) was a noble title in the peerage of France granted to Gilbert de Lévis de Ventadour by Henry IV of France in 1589. It is named after the Château de Ventadour.

== List of dukes of Ventadour, 1589—1717 ==
From	To	Duke of Ventadour	Relationship to predecessor
1589	1591	Gilbert de Lévis de Ventadour (d. 1591)	First Duke of Ventadour
1591	1622	Anne de Lévis de Ventadour (1569-1622)	Son of Gilbert de Lévis de Ventadour
1622	1651	Henri de Lévis de Ventadour (1596-1651)	Son of Anne de Lévis de Ventadour
1651	???	Charles de Lévis de Ventadour	Brother of Henri de Lévis de Ventadour
???	1717	Louis Charles de Lévis (1647-1717)	Son of Charles de Lévis de Ventadour

The title became extinct in 1717 when Louis Charles de Lévis died without a male heir.
