= John Walkinshaw =

John Walkinshaw, 3rd of Barrowfield (c.1671 – 1731) was a member of the Lowland Scottish gentry and the father of Clementina Walkinshaw, the mistress of Prince Charles Edward Stuart, who in 1745 attempted to regain the throne of Scotland on behalf of his father.

== Biography ==
Walkinshaw was the son of John Walkinshaw, 2nd of Barrowfield and Camlachie, and of Episcopalian background. He was a wealthy Glasgow merchant and established the textile quarters of Calton. A fervent Jacobite however, he fought in the 1715 rising and at the Battle of Sheriffmuir during which he was captured and imprisoned at Stirling Castle, but managed to escape and fled to the continent in exile. He married Katherine Paterson (born c.1683), daughter of Sir Hugh Paterson, 1st Baronet, with whom he had 10 daughters. Walkinshaw was with Chevalier Wogan when in 1719 he saved Clementina Sobieska on her way to wed King James. As a token of her gratitude, the Polish princess became the godmother of his newly born and aptly named daughter in Rome. He was eventually pardoned by the British government and returned to Glasgow, where he died in 1731.
