= Clan Paterson =

Lowland Scottish clan

- Motto: Huc Tendimus Omnes (We all strive for this)

Profile
- District: Bannockburn, Stirling
- Clan Paterson no longer has a chief, and is an armigerous clan
- Historic seat: Bannockburn House

Clan Paterson (Scottish Gaelic: MacPhadraig) is a Lowland Scottish clan. The clan is officially recognized as such by the Lord Lyon King of Arms; however, as the clan does not currently have a chief it is considered an Armigerous clan.

== History ==
=== Origins ===
The name Paterson in Scottish Gaelic is MacPhadraig, which could be a shortened form of MacGille Phadraig which means son of the devotee of Saint Patrick. This suggests that the ancestor may have been a churchman as the Celtic church allowed priests to marry. Or it could mean that the ancestor was a "layman" who was part of the ecclesiastical hierarchy.

In around the end of the 13th century the Patersons had settled on the shores of Loch Fyne with name becoming widespread in the Scottish Lowlands. As of 1994 it was amongst the twenty most common surnames in the Lowlands.

=== 15th and 16th centuries ===
A gentleman named William Paterson witnessed a charter in 1446 in Aberdeen. In 1563 James Paterson was sheriff-depute of Inverness in the Scottish Highlands. He later became Provost of Inverness.

=== 17th and 18th centuries ===
William Paterson was a founder of the Bank of England, but he is better-remembered as being the architect of the disastrous Darien scheme. The scheme was an attempt to establish a Scottish colony at the isthmus of Darien in Central America.

A celebrated episode of the Paterson family was during the Jacobite rising of 1745 when Sir Hugh Paterson, 2nd Baronet (of Bannockburn) entertained Prince Charles Edward Stuart in January 1746. Sir Hugh’s niece, Clementina, became Prince Charlie's mistress and bore him a daughter, Charlotte Stuart, Duchess of Albany. Bannockburn House still stands today as it was when Bonnie Prince Charlie visited it.

== Highland Patersons ==
The Scottish surname Paterson is also considered as a sept of the Clan MacLaren and Clan Farquharson who were based in the Scottish Highlands.

== See also ==
- Scottish clan
