= Hugh Paterson =

Hugh Paterson may refer to:

- Sir Hugh Paterson, 2nd Baronet (c. 1685–1777), Scottish Jacobite and member of the Parliament of Great Britain
- Sir Hugh Paterson, 1st Baronet (c. 1659–1701), Scottish baronet and landowner
