= Bannockburn House =

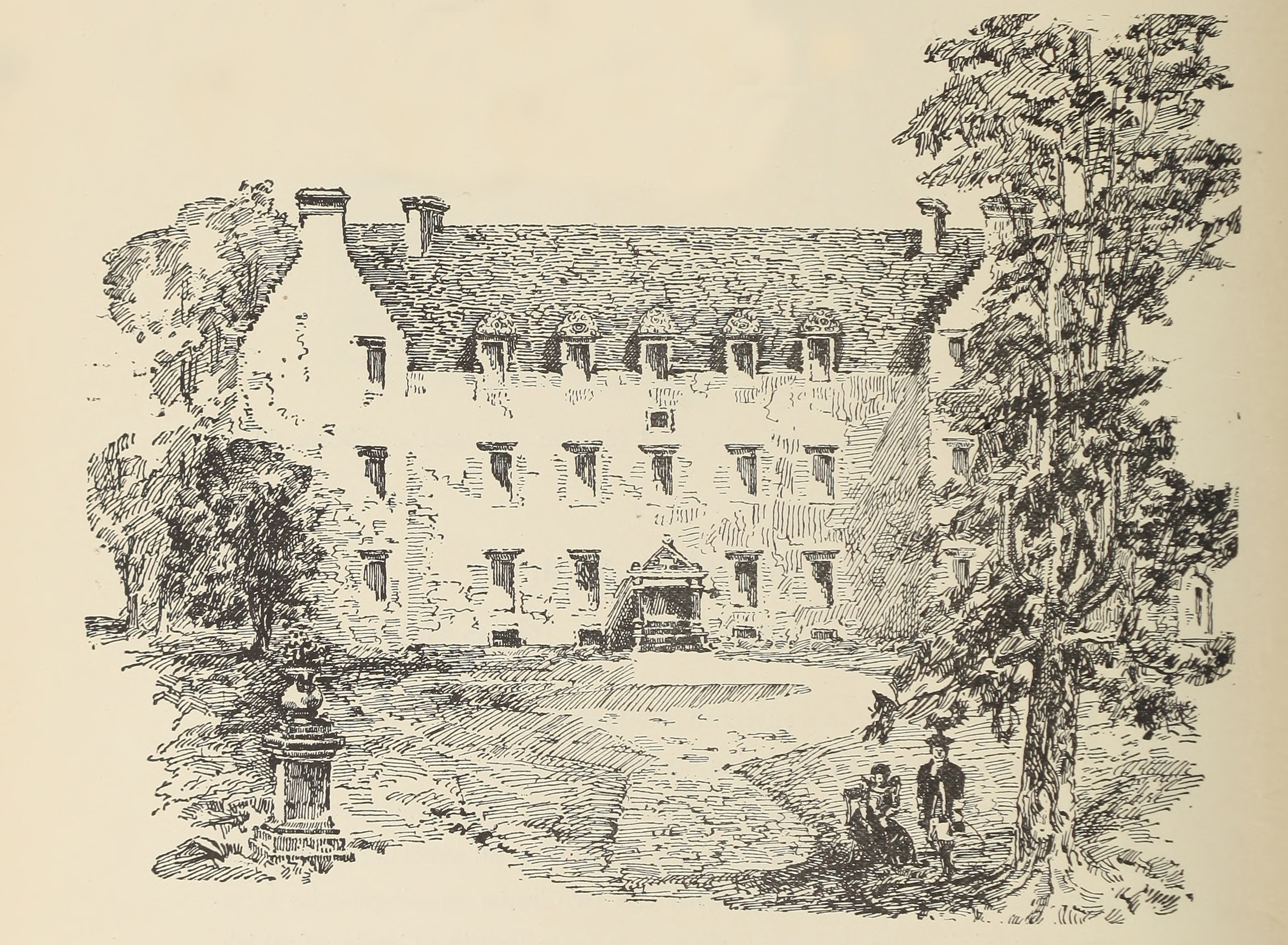
- Old Bannockburn Mansion
- Interactive map of the Bannockburn House area

General information
- Type: Country house
- Location: Bannockburn, Stirlingshire
- Location within Stirling
- 56.0778°N 3.9153°W
- Nearest city: Stirling

History
- Built for: Hugh Paterson
- Rebuilt: 1675

Listed Building – Category A

Bannockburn House is a late 17th century country house located in Bannockburn in Stirling, Scotland. Bannockburn House is located within the Battle of Sauchieburn Historic Battlefield and is north of Bannockburn Historic Battlefield. Bannockburn House is of cultural significance due to its association with medieval battles, Jacobite history, and ties to the tartan weaving industry. Bannockburn House is considered a property of historical significance in the town of Bannockburn and is a Category A listed building.

== History ==
Bannockburn House was built around 1675 and likely incorporated elements of an earlier house located on the same site. In 1562, the lands of Bannockburn were granted to Robert Drummond of Carnock and his wife Marjorie Elphinstone. Drummond took over an existing coal mine and a made a contract to supply coal to the burgesses of Stirling. The lands and the house "Drummonds-Hall" were subsequently acquired by the Rollo family, and then the Patersons.

The present house was most likely commissioned by Sir Hugh Paterson in 1675, whose son and grandson were made baronets. Hugh Paterson, the builder of the present house, was a lawyer for Margaret Home, Countess of Moray and her son the 5th Earl of Moray. Paterson became Keeper of the Signet when Moray was Secretary of State for Scotland in the 1680s.

Hugh Paterson had coal mines near Bannockburn, managed by William Rob, known as the "coal-grieve". Rob was dismissed for fraud and in 1677 made two attempts to sabotage the works in revenge. The Privy Council ordered the Earl of Mar and Lord Elphinstone to investigate.

A significant portion of the surviving interior dates to the 17th century, though some interior elements date to the early 18th century. Significant remodelling and expansion was undertaken around 1884 by Waller and sons.

In 1746, prior to the Battle of Culloden, Hugh Paterson, grandson of the builder of the house, entertained Charles Edward Stuart in Bannockburn House, where he met the Baronet's niece, Clementina Walkinshaw, who would later become his lover and mother of his child. When the house passed to his daughter, Mary Paterson, in 1787, she sold the property to William Ramsey of Barnton and Sauchie. The house stayed in the Ramsey Family until it came to Sir James Ramsey Gibson-Maitland, who sold it to Alexander Wilson in 1883. Alexander was a member of the famous Bannockburn weaving family of Wilson. Alexander made many additions and changes to the house, including a new porch entrance and extension to the library and office, and above the main doorway a recess to accommodate a coat of arms which now is empty.

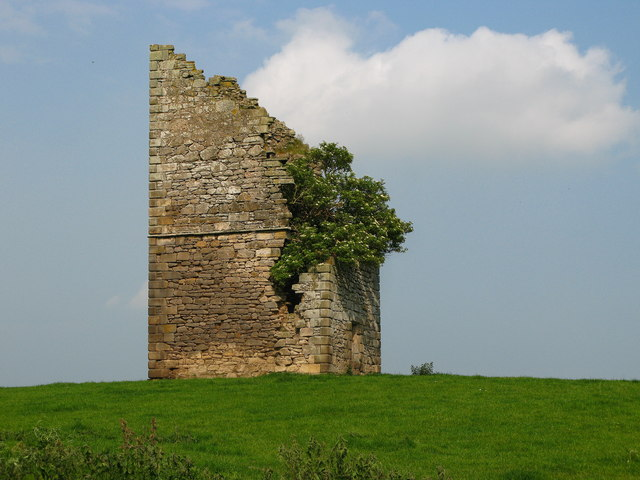
Bannockburn House Dovecote

In 1910 Bannockburn House was sold to the Sheriff Substitute of Stirling at the time, James Mitchell. In 1962 Mitchell's daughter sold the house, after living in it for 32 years. She sold the house to the multi-property owning millionaire A.E Pickard. The house was formerly owned by Peter Drake. It was placed on the market for sale in February 2016. A local charitable Community Trust was formed to try and purchase the house for the community and for the people of Scotland. Their aim is to safeguard the property for future generations. It was announced in April 2017 that the Trust had secured an exclusive right to buy the property and were actively fundraising to raise the required funds. This was achieved in November 2017 with a mixture of public money and grants.

In January 2025, it was announced that work was underway on repairing the roof, which had suffered water damage that was putting the ornate plasterwork ceiling at risk. The work, which was described as "vital to save the historic fabric of the building", involves documenting and examining every piece of material that needs to be removed or replaced. The repairs are being undertaken by a local firm, Old Plean Roofing.

== Archaeology ==
=== 2017 ===
In 2017 Historic Environment Scotland scanned the exterior of Bannockburn House to construct a set of floorplans for the house. A scan of the ground-level interior was also carried out.

=== 2018 ===
In August 2018 a programme of metal detecting and test pitting was undertaken on the grounds with the goal of confirming the possible presence of the Jacobite army camp that was set up prior to the Siege at Stirling and the Battle of Falkirk in January 1746. Metal detecting and excavation was led by Dr Murray Cook with the assistance of a team of local volunteers and support of the Bannockburn House Trust. Six one metre by one metre test pits were excavated across the grounds. Three of the test pits revealed a total of two pits and four postholes. 74 iron artefacts were found, most of which were unidentifiable due to their poor state of preservation. Additionally, seven copper alloy coins and buttons and one lead pistol bullet were found. The excavations did not reveal any evidence of occupation prior to the 19th century.

=== 2019 excavations ===
In July 2019 an evaluation of the grounds of Bannockburn were undertaken as part of a wider programme of works related to the development of a Conservation Plan and Masterplan for the house and grounds. The evaluations were undertaken by Addyman Archaeology. A total of three trenches were excavated. Trench 1 and Trench 2 were excavated in the field along the eastern boundary of the estate where research indicated that the remains of a trackway associated with coal mining nearby. Trench 3 was excavated within the remains of a walled garden to investigate the location of the former central path.

Trench 1 revealed a kerbed and cambered metal trackway that ran along the eastern boundary of the estate. Trench 1 also crossed a drainage ditch associated with a former rockery. Trench 2 revealed a less well preserved portion of the trackway as well as a later surface likely a later iteration of the trackway. Both portions of track were constructed on top of a layer of midden material. In the midden part of the neck and strap handle of a green glazed redware dating to the 16th or 17th century was found. The size and condition of the piece of pottery indicate that it likely had not travelled far, suggesting the possibility of an earlier settlement in the area.

Trench 3 revealed the remains of a narrow, cinder-topped path that was roughly in live with the path shown in the first edition of the ordnance survey map.

=== 2019 geophysical investigation ===
A geophysical investigation consisting of an electrical resistance survey and gradiometric survey was undertaken in the field just east of the walled garden was in autumn of 2019. This geophysical investigation was part of a programme of assessments that were undertaken prior to the installation of poly tunnels and the planting of shelter belts and orchards on the grounds. The data from the resistance survey revealed widespread low-resistance responses in the southern part of the field. This likely corresponds to a pond or an open water channel that led from the rockery in the walled garden and then drained into the field. A low, circular earthwork was also visible in the southern part of the survey area, and at center of the earthwork is strong magnetic response and low resistance anomaly. It is uncertain indicated the presence of a mine capping/entrance or an accumulation of modern materials.

Another area of high resistance anomalies were detected in the southern part of the field that suggested the potential presence of structural remains (though it is possible that this anomaly is a result of a natural feature). alongside the boundary of the field a strong strong magnetic response and high resistance was recorded. It is uncertain what the cause of the magnetic anomaly is, but there is a clear southern limit of the anomalies and it may be the result of midden deposits that were used as infill to level the ground.

Another area of high resistance with defined boundaries was recorded in the northern part of the fields, which might suggest the presence of structural remains, anthropogenic activity, or natural features.

=== 2021 ===
In 2021 a partial excavation was undertaken to understand the extent and use of a potential 19th century midden that was identified during water supply works that occurred in 2019. A total of six trenches were excavated; three south of the pipeline that was laid in 2019, and three north of the pipeline. The Trenches were excavated to a maximum depth of 1 metre deep when possible. The trenches revealed that the midden had a defined boundary to the south. This boundary was bounded by a vertical semicircular rock exposure. This feature may be the remains of a coal working site or an exploratory pit that was later repurposed into a midden heap. The rock outcrop was not found north of the pipeline, so it was not possible to determine the extent of the midden deposits to the north. The artefacts that were found in the midden included a variety of utilitarian and decorative items, including decorative pottery, fragments of bottle glass, and metal objects dating to between 1802 and 1910. Additionally, the midden deposit included a large amount of coal ash (likely from the hearths of the House), building rubble, slate shingles, and deposits of tarry material (likely building material waste from when the house was extended and renovated in the Victorian period)

=== March 2023 ===
In March 2023 a walkover survey was carried out on the grounds of Bannockburn to identify any previously unidentified features. Previously identified features, including one of the gardens and evidence of agriculture and coal mining were recorded. Two previously unidentified features were recorded. The first was a linear feature that, on map or lidar, appeared to be a field boundary. When examined on the ground the it was determined that the feature consisted of a ditch or channel that measures approximately 65 metres long, 3 metres wide, and one metre deep. One side of the ditch has a steep, higher bank on one side and a smaller ditch beyond the lower side. No evidence of stone walling on the sides of the ditch was found. The feature has been cut by the construction of the A91 road and was terminated by a field wall at its northwest end. There is no evidence that it continues past the field wall into the adjacent field. This feature is possibly the remains of a ha-ha.

The second feature that was revealed during the May 2023 walkover was a turf embankment, which can be traced on the ground. The embankment extends from a post-and-wire fence and extends 9.8 metres north-northeast, then continues in north-northwest for an additional 7.4 metres. A section was exposed at the point where the embankment turns and sketches were made. The embankment was made of a turf-covered stone foundation made of local cut freestone. Lidar showed a series of rig and furrow, which wasn't visible on the ground. The embankment is likely a part of the arable landscape that predates the formation of the later garden features.

=== July 2023 ===
On 10 July 2023 a trial excavated was undertaken in anticipation of the creation of a car park. Six trenches were excavated (approximately five percent of the area of the car park). No significant archaeological remains or deposits were revealed.

== Filming location ==
The house and estate have been used as a filming location for Susan Hill's Ghost Story, an adaptation of her novel, The Small Hand, shown on Channel 5 on Boxing Day 2019. The film stars Douglas Henshall and Louise Lombard.
