= Clementina (novel) =

1901 novel by A. E. W. Mason

- First edition
- Author: A. E. W. Mason
- Language: English
- Genre: Historical adventure romance
- Publisher: Methuen
- Publication date: 1901
- Publication place: UK
- Media type: Print

Clementina is a 1901 historical adventure romance novel by A. E. W. Mason. It is a fictionalised account of the rescue in 1719 of Maria Clementina Sobieska, later mother of Charles Edward Stuart ("Bonnie Prince Charlie"), from her imprisonment at the hands of Charles VI, Holy Roman Emperor prior to her marriage to James Stuart, Jacobite claimant to the British and Irish thrones.

The book was initially serialised in The Sphere from 6 April to 28 September 1901, with illustrations by Bernard Partridge.

== Plot ==
Having unsuccessfully attempted to gain the British and Irish thrones during the Jacobite rising of 1715, James Stuart decides to marry, and sends Charles Wogan, an Irish soldier of fortune, on an extended search to locate a suitable wife. Wogan selects for him the Polish princess Clementina Sobieska, but while she is on her way across Europe to join James at Bologna, she is kidnapped and held prisoner at Innsbruck by the Holy Roman Emperor Charles VI, with the approval of the Protestant King George I of Great Britain (who wishes to prevent James from establishing a Catholic dynasty).

Wogan persuades James to allow him undertake a daring rescue mission, and with the help of three of his closest friends, Gaydon, Misset and O'Toole, he succeeds in releasing Clementina in the face of significant resistance from soldiers and espionage agents loyal to the emperor. In peril of their lives, the party travel with all speed across enemy territory, aiming to reach the safety of Venetian territory before pursuers can catch up with them. The pressures of the chase bring Wogan and Clementina together and they fall in love. The pair have to decide whether to flee together into permanent exile, or whether they should continue to Bologna. Pressed by Clementina to make the final decision, Wogan remains loyal to James Stuart, and gives up his love.

What neither know, however, is that James has already taken a mistress in Bologna, Maria Vittoria de Caprara, and that his interest in Clementina has waned. When Maria Vittoria learns that Clementina is once again on her way and that the marriage cannot be avoided, she insists that James travels to Spain in order to avoid what she sees as his humiliating wait in Bologna.

On her arrival in Bologna, Clementina is surprised that James is not present, and when he fails to return from Spain she threatens to refuse to go through with the marriage. Wogan is dispatched to Rome to bring Maria Vittoria back, the two women quickly become friends, and Clementina consents to be married. As James is still in Spain, Wogan stands in for the groom at the altar, and James is married by proxy to Clementina.

In an epilogue, the author recounts that husband and wife were never well matched, and that Clementina ultimately sought the sanctuary of a convent. Wogan is appointed governor of La Mancha in Spain, and remains a lifelong bachelor, never again meddling with matters of the heart.

== Principal characters ==
- James Stuart, the Chevalier de St. George, Jacobite claimant to the British and Irish thrones
- Charles Wogan, Irish soldier of fortune and aide to James Stuart
- Dick Gaydon, friend of Wogan
- Jack Misset, friend of Wogan
- Lucius O'Toole, friend of Wogan
- Clementina Sobieska, Polish princess and James Stuart's intended bride
- Maria Vittoria de Caprara, mistress of James Stuart

== Background ==
The novel is a fictionalised account of a true historical rescue mission, and Wogan, Gaydon, Misset and O'Toole are all based on real people. Before the real-life husband and wife separated, Maria Clementina bore James two sons, Charles Edward Stuart ("Bonnie Prince Charlie") and Henry Benedict Cardinal Stuart (Jacobite Duke of York). The idea for the novel was suggested to Mason by his friend Andrew Lang who had been working on the historical material, including a surviving account by Charles Wogan himself. The romance between Wogan and Clementina is fictional.

== Literary significance and criticism ==
The book was received favourably, and its popularity made it one of Mason's best known early historical romances, although Mason's biographer Roger Lancelyn Green argued that neither the spiritual battle between duty and desire nor the pure adventure were quite enough to carry the story in their own right. According to Green, when the author returned to the genre more than thirty years later in Fire Over England he had progressed far from this earlier work and was able to succeed with the "higher type of historical fiction" that can be dimly glimpsed here.

A 1901 review in The Globe called the book one of Mason's best romances, written in the true spirit of adventure, exhaling the atmosphere of the times, and holding the attention throughout. Noting the story's historical foundations, the reviewer considered that the average reader might not consider the love element to be quite sympathetic, but will have to admit that the tale is eminently well told.

== Bibliography ==
- Green, Roger Lancelyn (1952). A. E. W. Mason. London: Max Parrish.
