= Paterson baronets =

Extinct baronetcy in the Baronetage of Nova Scotia

There have been two baronetcies created for people with the surname Paterson, both in the Baronetage of Nova Scotia.

The first creation, of Bannockburn in the county of Stirling, was for Hugh Paterson on 16 March 1686. The second baronet sat in the House of Commons for Stirlingshire and was attainted in 1716, when the title was forfeit.

The second creation, of Eccles in the county of Berwick, was for William Paterson on 9 July 1687. The third baronet sat in the House of Commons for Berwickshire. On his death in 1782 the title became dormant.

== Paterson, of Bannockburn (1686) ==
- Sir Hugh Paterson, 1st Baronet (died 21 December 1702)
- Sir Hugh Paterson, 2nd Baronet (c. 1685 – 23 March 1777)

== Paterson, of Eccles (1687) ==
- Sir William Paterson, 1st Baronet (c. 1630 – 29 September 1709)
- Sir John Paterson, 2nd Baronet (11 April 1673 – 14 December 1759)
- Sir John Paterson, 3rd Baronet (c. 1730 – 14 January 1782)

== See also ==
- Sir Philip Anstruther-Paterson, 3rd Baronet
