= Sir Hugh Paterson, 1st Baronet =

Scottish baronet and landowner

Sir Hugh Paterson
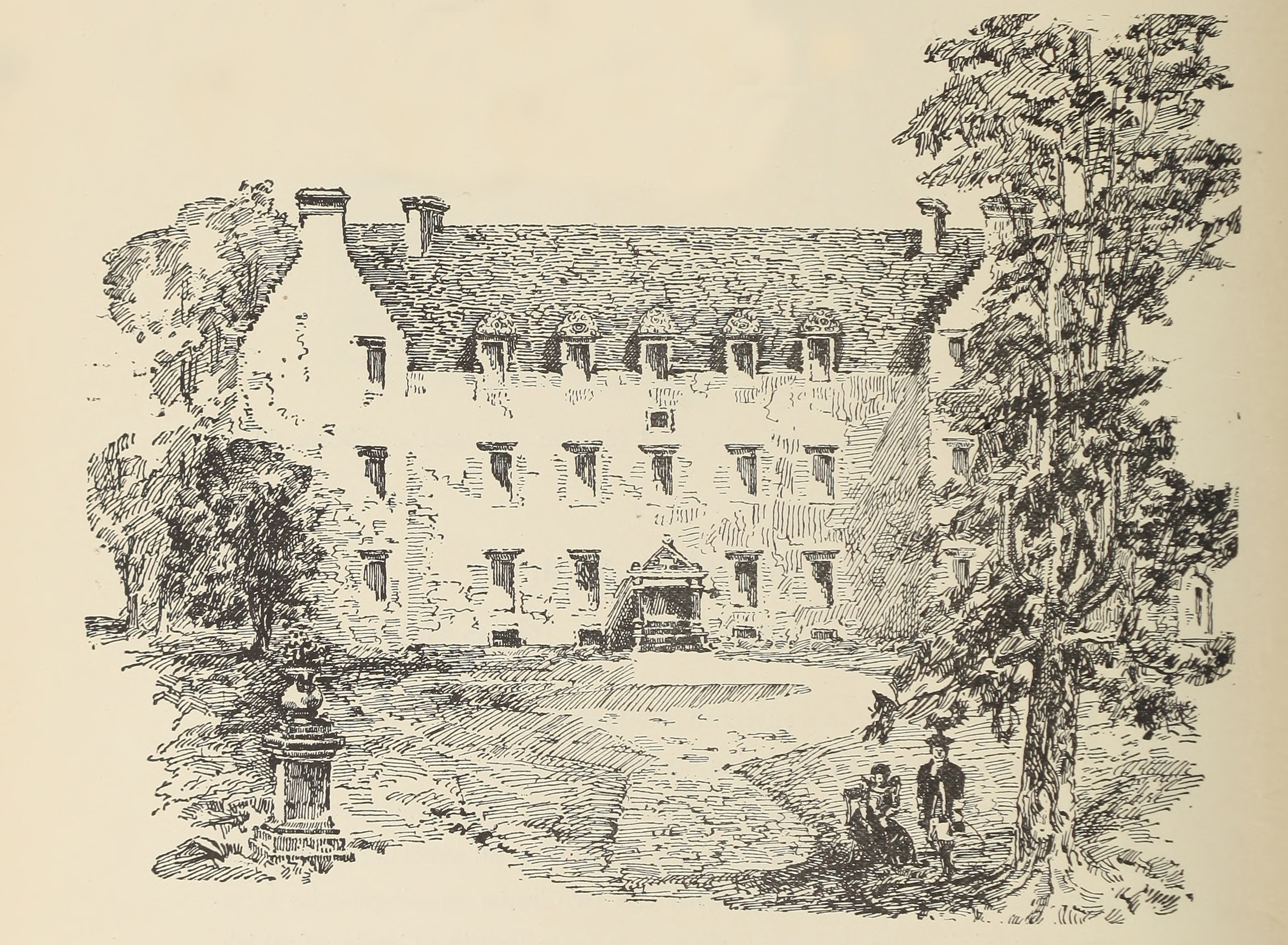
- Bannockburn House
- Born: 1659; Dunglass, Dunbartonshire, Scotland
- Died: 21 December 1701 (aged 41–42); Bannockburn, Stirlingshire, Scotland
- Known for: Baronet of Bannockburn
- Spouse: Barbara Ruthven (born 1663)

Sir Hugh Paterson, 1st Baronet of Bannockburn (c. 1659 – 1701), was a Scottish baronet and landowner.

== Life ==
He was born circa 1659, the son of the lawyer and writer to the signet Hugh Paterson (died October 1696) and his wife Elizabeth Kerr, a daughter of Thomas Kerr of Ferniehirst. His father, Hugh Paterson, became Keeper of the Signet when the Earl of Moray was Secretary of State for Scotland in the 1680s.

Hugh Paterson's father acquired the Bannockburn estate from Andrew Rollo, 11th Laird of Duncrub and 3rd Lord Rollo. Paterson built much of the current house, and it is little changed since his time. Hugh Paterson, the son, worked for his father as a lawyer and qualified as a writer in 1682.

The Patersons were staunch Royalists and James VII gave Hugh the title of Baronet of Bannockburn.

Hugh Paterson died on 21 December 1701. His assets included sixteenth part shares of two ships.

His son, the Second Baronet attainted his Baronetcy by being an open and fierce Jacobite, but he lived on at Bannockburn House.

In a brief stay at Bannockburn House, Charles Edward Stuart met the 2nd Baronet's niece, Clementina Walkinshaw, who would eventually be the Young Prince's lover and mother of his daughter.

== Family ==
He married Barbara Ruthven (c.1663–1695), daughter of Sir William Ruthven of Dunglass and Katherine Douglas, daughter of the 1st Marquess of Douglas. His son and successor, Sir Hugh Paterson, 2nd Baronet married Jane Erskine, daughter of the Earl of Mar and sister of James Erskine, Lord Grange bringing both Hugh and Jane into contact with James' notorious wife, Rachel Chiesley, Lady Grange. His daughter Katherine married John Walkinshaw, and was the mother of Clementina Walkinshaw, who became Prince Charles Edward Stuart's mistress.

== See also ==
- Paterson baronets, of Bannockburn
- Clan Paterson

Baronetage of Nova Scotia
| New creation | Baronet (of Bannockburn); 1686–1702 | Succeeded by Hugh Paterson |
