= Charlotte Stuart, Duchess of Albany =

Only child of Bonnie Prince Charlie

Charlotte Stuart
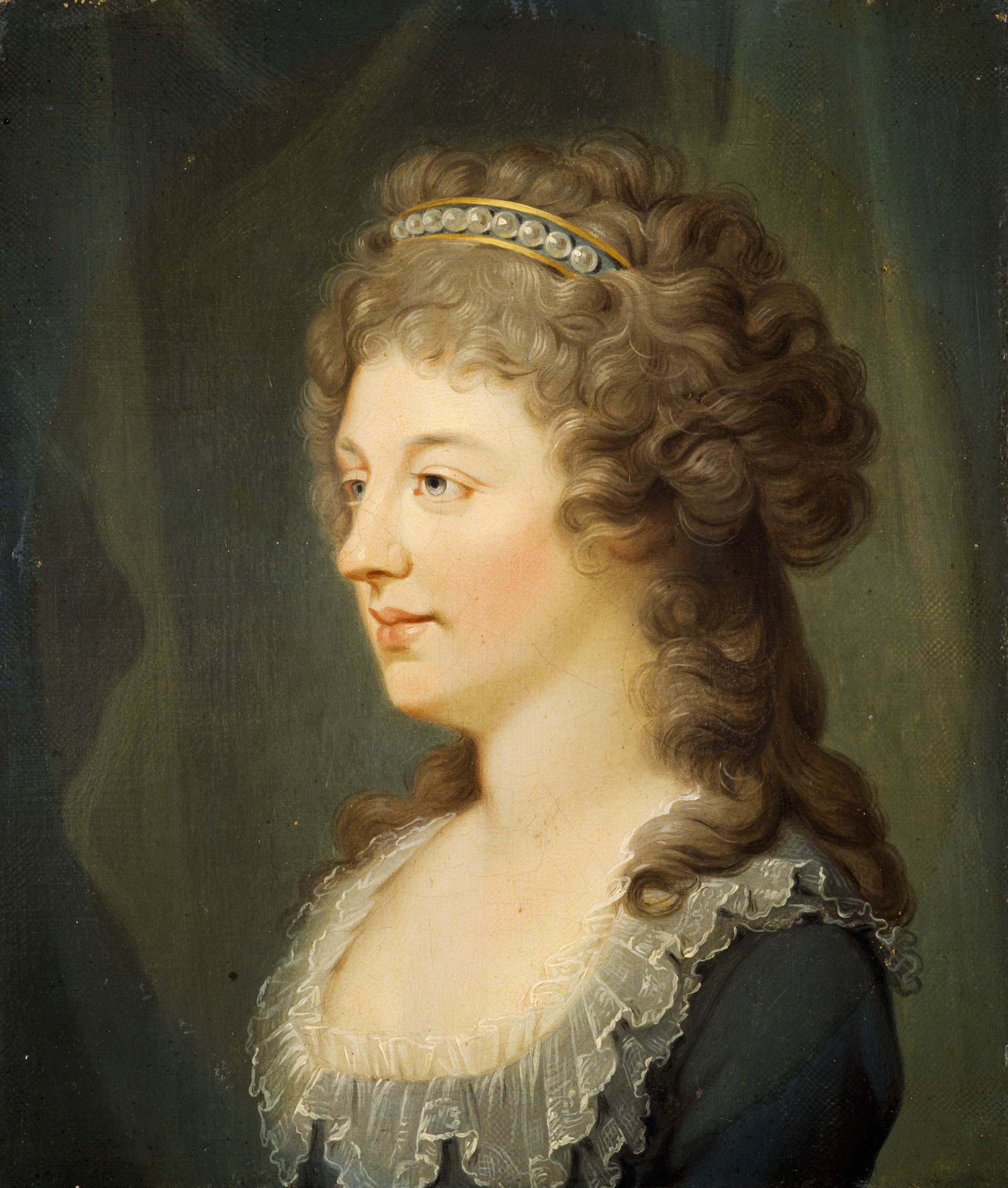
- Born: 29 October 1753; Liège
- Died: 17 November 1789 (aged 36); Palazzo Vizzani Sanguinetti, Bologna
- Title: Duchess of Albany
- Partner: Ferdinand Maximilien Mériadec de Rohan
- Children: At least 3, including Charles Edward Stuart, Count Roehenstart
- Parents: Charles Edward Stuart; Clementina Walkinshaw

Charlotte Stuart, styled Duchess of Albany (29 October 1753 – 17 November 1789) was the illegitimate daughter of the Jacobite pretender Charles Edward Stuart ("Bonnie Prince Charlie" or the "Young Pretender") and his only child to survive infancy.

Charlotte's mother was Clementina Walkinshaw, who was mistress to Charles Edward from 1752 until 1760. After years of abuse, Clementina left him, taking Charlotte with her. Charlotte spent most of her life in French convents, estranged from a father who refused to make any provision for her. Unable to marry, she herself became a mistress with illegitimate children, taking Ferdinand de Rohan, Archbishop of Bordeaux, as her lover.

She was finally reconciled with her father in 1784, when he legitimised her and created her Duchess of Albany in the Jacobite peerage. She left her children with her mother, and became her father's carer and companion in the last years of his life, before dying less than two years after him. Her offspring was raised in anonymity; however, as Prince Charles Stuart's only grandchildren, they have been the subject of Jacobite interest since their lineage was uncovered in the 20th century.

== Royal parentage ==
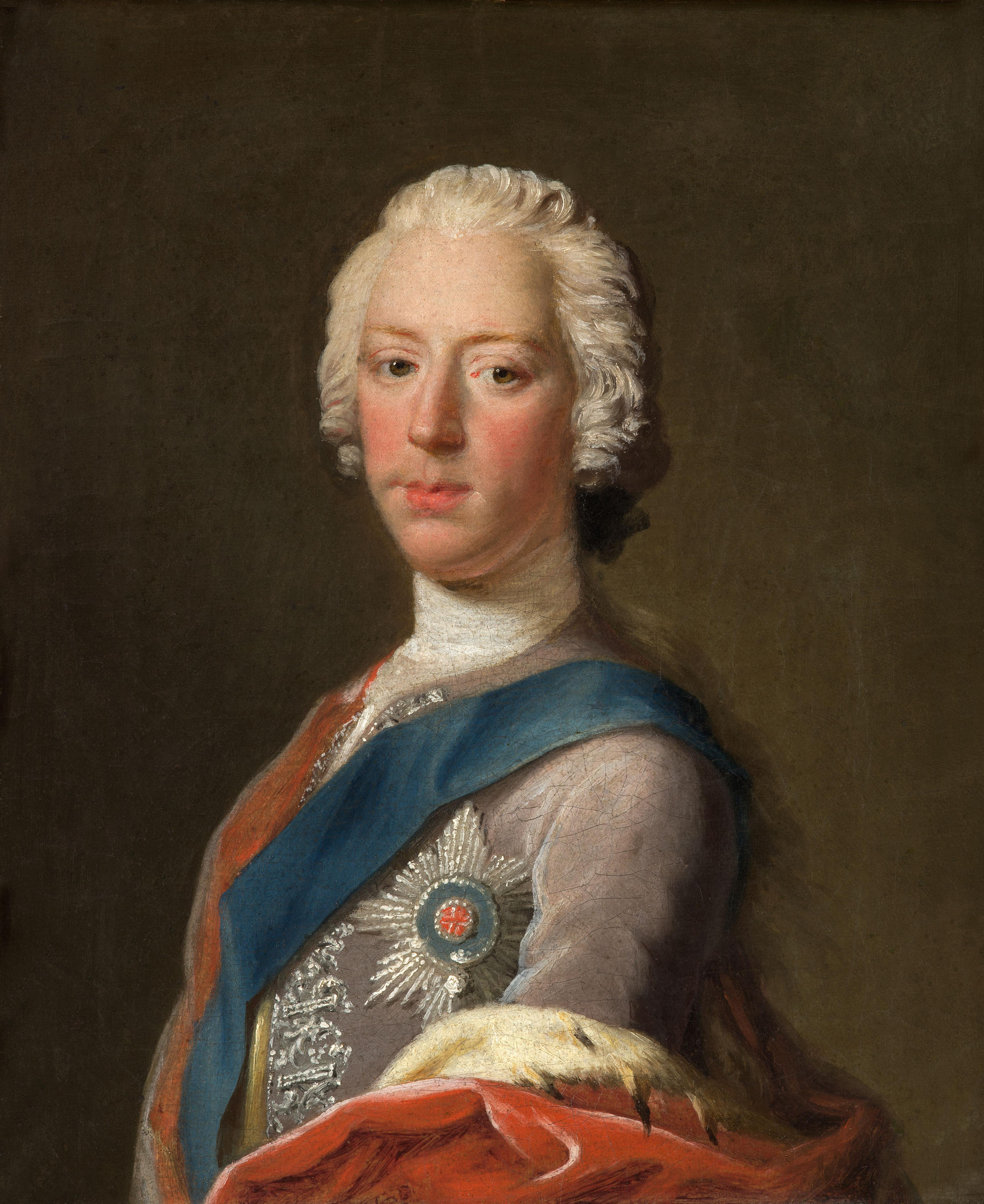
Prince Charles Edward Stuart (portrait by Allan Ramsay, c. 1745)

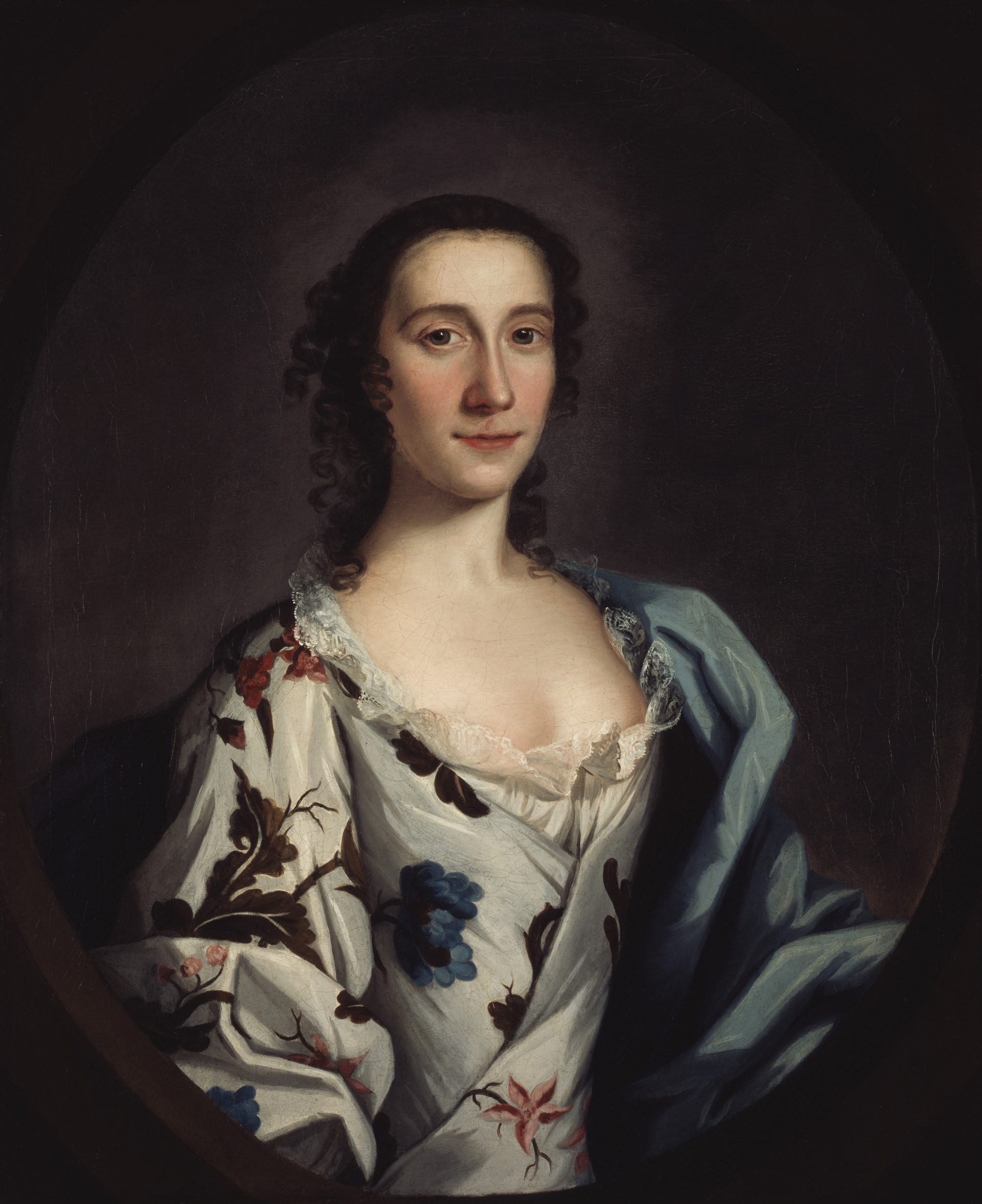
Clementina Walkinshaw (unknown artist, c. 1760)

Charlotte Stuart was born on 29 October 1753 in Liège to Charles and his mistress, Clementina Walkinshaw. Charles and Clementina had met during the Jacobite rising of 1745, when he came to Scotland from France in an attempt to regain by force the thrones of England, Scotland and Ireland, which had been lost by his grandfather, James II of England (and VII of Scotland) in 1689. Clementina was the youngest of the ten daughters of John Walkinshaw of Barrowhill. The Walkinshaws owned the lands of Barrowfield and Camlachie, and her father had become a wealthy Glasgow merchant (founding the textile village of Calton). However, he was also an Episcopalian Protestant and a Jacobite who had fought for the Prince's father in the rising of 1715, been captured at the Battle of Sheriffmuir, before escaping from Stirling Castle and fleeing to continental Europe. In 1717, he had been pardoned by the British government and returned to Glasgow, where his youngest daughter was born probably at Camlachie. However, Clementina was largely educated on the Continent and later converted to Roman Catholicism. In 1746, she was living at the home of her uncle Sir Hugh Paterson at Bannockburn, near Stirling. The Prince came to Sir Hugh's home in early January 1746, where he first met Clementina, and he returned later that month to be nursed by her from what appears to have been a cold. Since she was living under her uncle's protection, it is not thought the two were lovers at the time.

After the defeat of the Prince's rebellion at the Battle of Culloden in April 1746, Charles fled Scotland for France. In the following years, he had a scandalous affair with his 22-year-old first cousin Louise de Montbazon, who was married to his close friend and whom he deserted when she became pregnant, and then with the Princess of Talmont, who was in her forties. In 1752, he heard that Clementina was at Dunkirk and in some financial difficulties and so he sent 50 louis d'or to help her and then dispatched Sir Henry Goring to entreat her to come to Ghent and to live with him as his mistress. Goring, who described Clementina as a "bad woman", complained of being used as "no better than a pimp" and soon left Charles's employ. However, by November 1752, Clementina was living with Charles and would remain as his mistress for the following eight years. The couple moved to Liège where Charlotte, their only child, was born on 29 October 1753 and baptised into the Roman Catholic faith at the church of Notre Dame-des-Fonts in Liège.

== Separation from father (1760–1783) ==
The relationship between the prince and Charlotte's mother was disastrous. Charles was already a disillusioned, angry alcoholic when they began living together, and he became violent towards and insanely possessive of Clementina, treating her as a "submissive whipping post". Often away from home on "jaunts", he seldom referred to his daughter, and when he did, it was as "ye cheild". During a temporary move to Paris, the Prince's lieutenants record ugly public arguments between the two and that his drunkenness and temper were damaging his reputation. By 1760, they were in Basel, and Clementina had had enough of Charles's intoxication and their nomadic lifestyle. She contacted his staunchly Roman Catholic father, James Stuart, and expressed a desire to secure a Catholic education for Charlotte, and to retire to a convent. James agreed to pay her an annuity of 10,000 livres and, in July 1760, there is evidence to suggest he aided her escape from the watchful Charles, with the seven-year-old Charlotte, to the convent of the Nuns of the Visitation in Paris. She left a letter for Charles expressing her devotion to him but complaining she had to flee in fear of her life. A furious Charles circulated descriptions of them both, but it was to no avail.

=== Appeals from France ===
For the next twelve years, Clementina and Charlotte continued to live in various French convents, supported by the 10,000-livre pension granted by James Stuart. Charles never forgave Clementina for depriving him of "ye cheild", and stubbornly refused to pay anything for their support. On 1 January 1766 James died, but Charles, now considering himself de jure Charles III of Scotland, England and Ireland, still refused to make any provision for the two, forcing Clementina, now styling herself Countess Alberstroff, to appeal to his brother Cardinal Henry Stuart for assistance. Henry gave them an allowance of 5,000 livres, but in return extracted a statement from Clementina that she had never been married to Charles—a statement she later tried to retract.

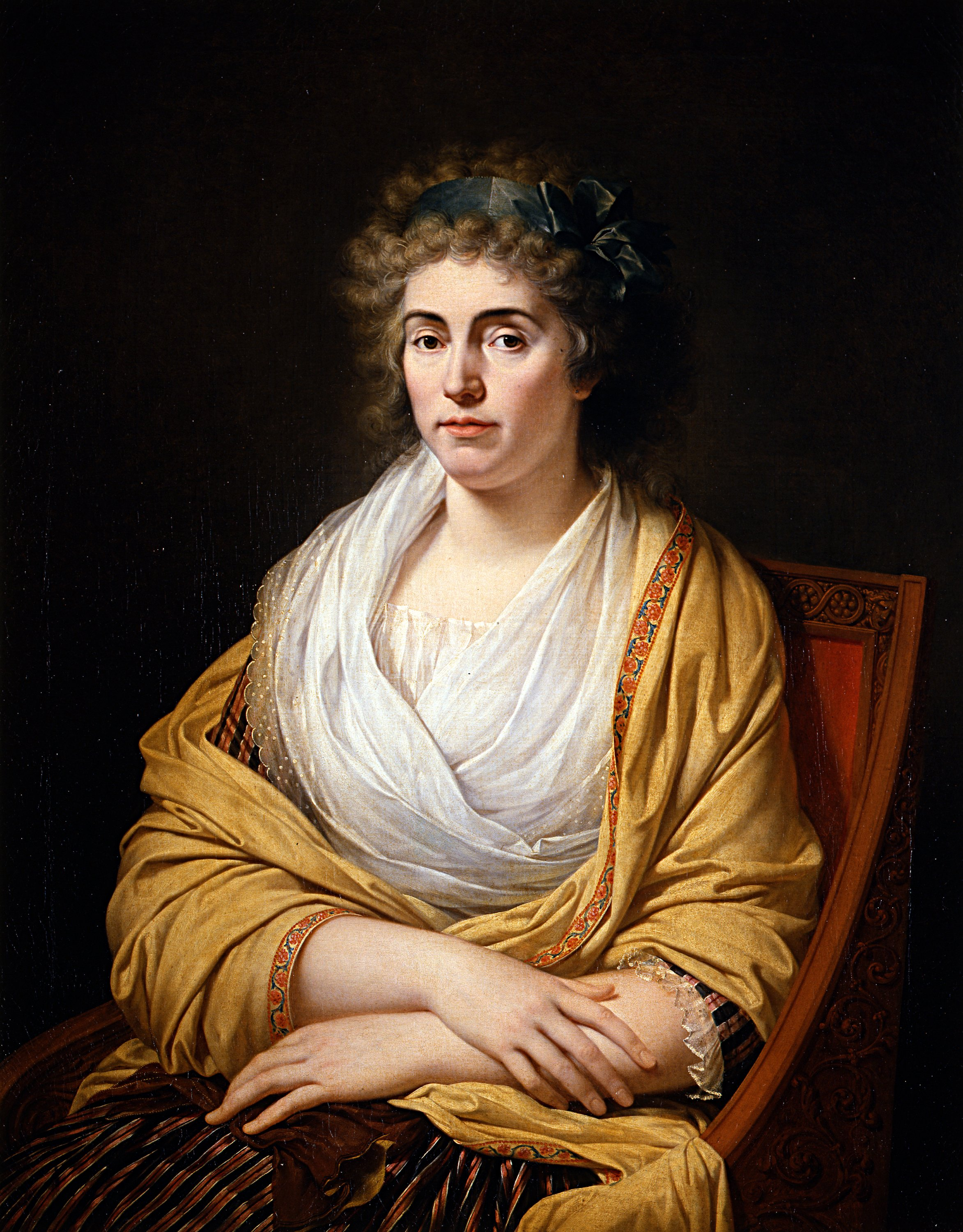
Louise of Stolberg-Gedern, Charles's wife. She was only months older than his daughter Charlotte.

In 1772, the Prince, then aged fifty-one, married the nineteen-year-old Princess Louise of Stolberg-Gedern, who was only a year older than Charlotte. Charlotte, now in penury, had consistently been writing to her father for some time, and she now desperately entreated him to legitimise her, provide support and bring her to Rome before an heir could be born. In April 1772, Charlotte wrote a touching, yet pleading, letter to "mon Auguste Papa" which was sent via Principal Gordon of the Scots College in Rome. Charles relented and offered to bring Charlotte to Rome—he was now resident in the Palazzo Muti, the residence of the Stuarts-in-exile—but only on condition she would leave her mother behind in France. This she loyally refused to do, and Charles, in fury, broke off all discussions.

=== Mistress of an Archbishop ===
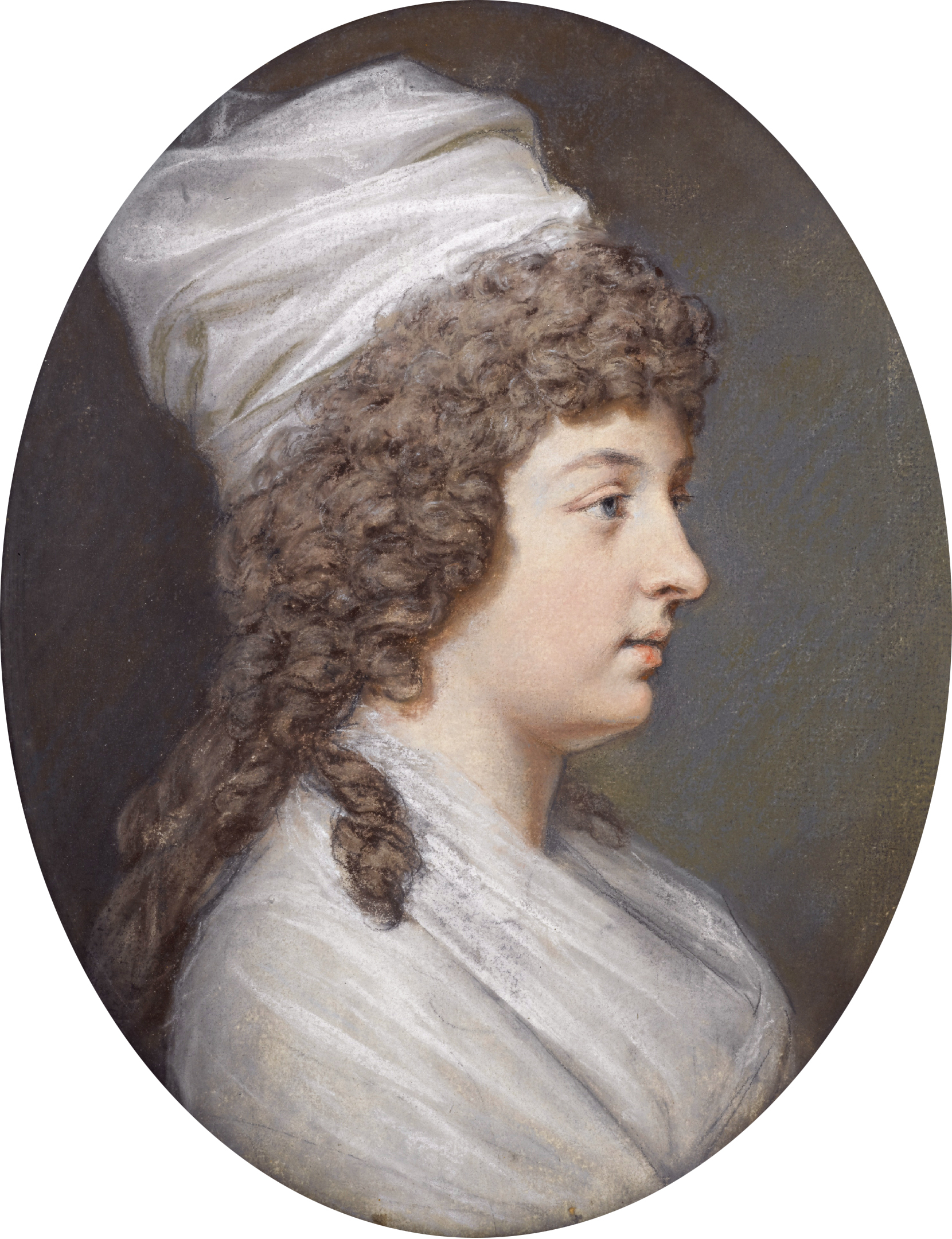
A painting of Charlotte by Hugh Douglas Hamilton (c. 1788)

Towards the end of 1772, Clementina and Charlotte unexpectedly arrived in Rome to press their desperate cause in person. However, the Prince reacted angrily, refusing even to see them, forcing their helpless return to France, from where Charlotte's pleading letters continued. Three years later, Charlotte, now in her twenty-second year was in poor health. She was apparently suffering from a liver ailment shared by the Stuarts and decided her only option was to marry as soon as possible. Charles, however, refused to give permission either for her to marry or to take the veil, and she was left awaiting his royal pleasure.

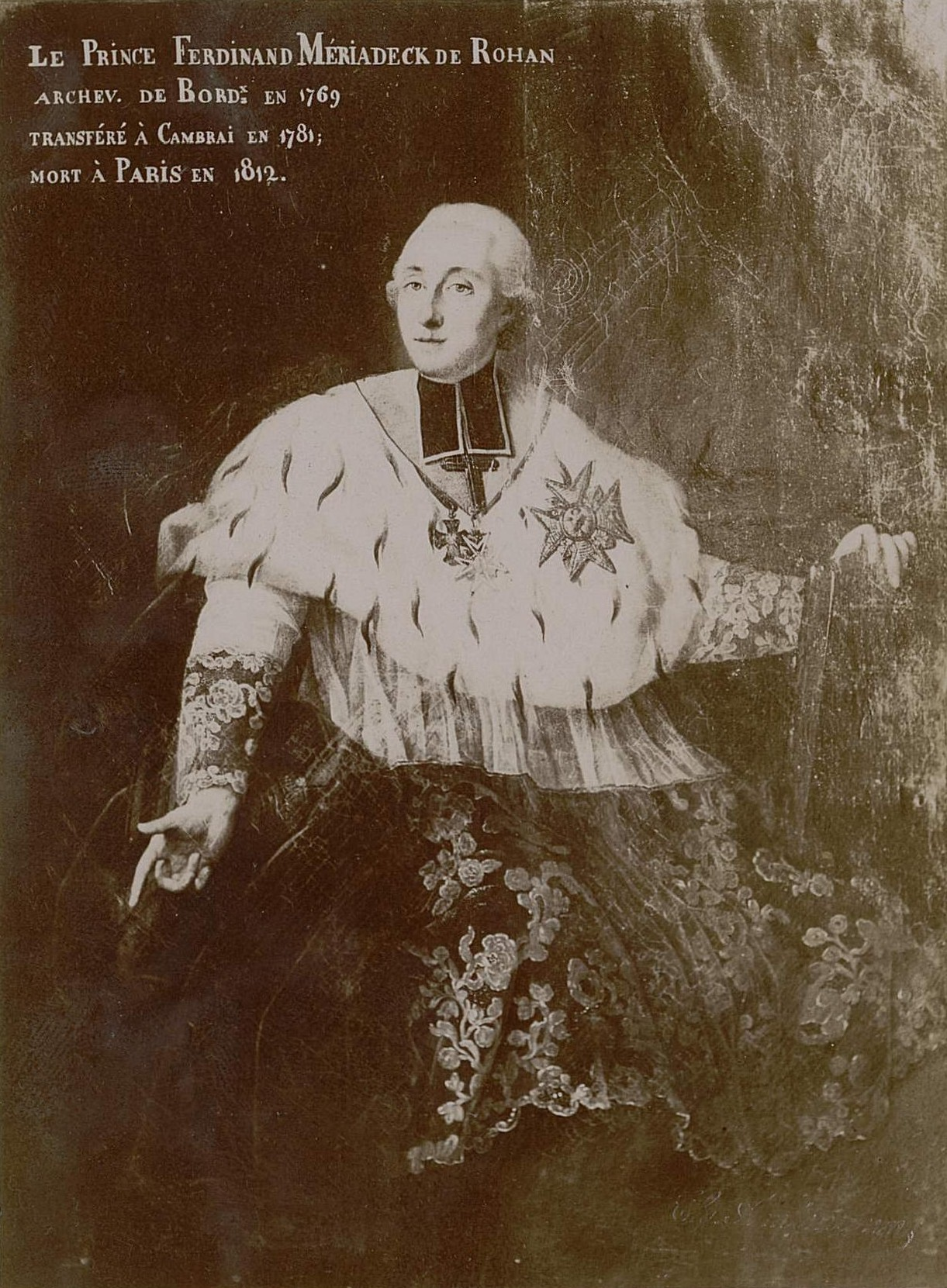
Ferdinand-Maximilien-Mériadec de Rohan (1738–1812), Archbishop of Bordeaux in 1769

Lacking legitimacy or permission, Charlotte was unable to marry. Therefore she sought a protector and provider. Probably unbeknown to Charles, she became the mistress of Ferdinand Maximilien Mériadec de Rohan, Archbishop of Bordeaux and Cambrai. Ferdinand de Rohan—related by blood to the house of Stuart as well as Bourbon and Lorraine—was also unable to marry legitimately, having entered the Church as a younger son of a noble house. By him, she had at least three children: two daughters, Charlotte Maximilienne Amélie and Marie Victoire or Victoire Adélaïde, and finally a son, Charles Edward. Her children were kept secret and remained largely unknown until the 20th century. When Charlotte eventually left France for Florence, she entrusted her children, and she was only just recovering from her son's birth, to the care of her mother, and it appears that few, and certainly not her father, knew of their existence.

== Reconciliation with her father ==
Only after his childless marriage to Louise was over, and Charles had fallen seriously ill, did he take an interest in Charlotte. She was now thirty and she had not seen her father since she was seven. On 23 March 1783, he altered his will to make her his heir and, a week later, signed an act of legitimisation. This act, recognising her as his natural daughter and entitling her to succeed to his private estate, was sent to Louis XVI of France. Henry Stuart, however, contested the legitimisation as being irregular and confusing to the succession. Louis XVI eventually did confirm the act and register it with the Parlement of Paris, but not until 6 September 1787.

In July 1784, having granted his wife Louise a legal separation, Charles wrote to his daughter calling her "ma chère fille". In his letter, he summoned Charlotte to Florence, where he was now resident. She arrived in Florence on 5 October 1784. In November, he installed her in the Palazzo Guadagni as Duchess of Albany, styling her "Her Royal Highness". Nevertheless, being illegitimate at birth, Charlotte still had no right of succession to the Stuart claim to the British throne. However, by this stage, the claims were of little value. European rulers had long since ceased to take Charles seriously. Even Pope Pius VI was refusing to recognise his royal title, and the famous Casanova had wittily called him the "pretender-in-vain". He was reduced to styling himself the Count d'Albany.

That a Stuart restoration was now less than unlikely did not prevent the Prince presenting Charlotte as the next generation of the cause. On 30 November 1784, Charles held a 'State' banquet for Charlotte and invested her with the Order of the Thistle. He had medals struck for her, bearing the figure of Hope, the map of England, and the Stuart arms with legends such as "Spes Tamen Est Una" ("there is one hope"). He also had her idealised in art; the Scottish artist Gavin Hamilton was commissioned to draw her in chalk in the neo-classical style, whilst Hugh Douglas Hamilton painted a flattering portrait in a tiara.

=== Companion to her father ===
When Charlotte arrived to live with her father in 1784, he was an ailing alcoholic. She found his physical state disgusting, and he was suffering from mental degeneration and using a litter for travel. He did, however, introduce Charlotte into society, allowing her to wear his mother's famous Sobieska jewellery. She continually, and unsuccessfully, sought gifts of jewels or money from her close-fisted father; but this was probably largely out of a concern for the welfare of her mother and children. Within a month of arriving at Florence, she did manage to persuade her father to provide at last for Clementina. By this time, Charlotte was also in poor health, suffering from an ailment that would result in her death from "obstruction of the liver" just two years after her father. Indeed, shortly after she arrived in Florence, a protruding growth forced her to have clothes altered. The biographer Douglas reports that around this time, a visitor described her as:

a tall, robust woman of a very dark complexion and a coarse-grained skin, with more of a masculine boldness than feminine modesty or elegancy, but easy and unassuming in her manners, amply possessed of... volubility of tongue and... spirit of coquetry.

Charlotte sorely missed her mother (whom she vainly hoped Charles would allow to come to Rome) and her children, writing to her mother as many as 100 times in a single year; she also feared that Rohan would take another lover; all this is revealed in her dispirited letters home, as she awaited Charles's death. She was successful in helping to organise her father's social life, as well as in persuading him to reduce his drinking in his final years. When staying for a short visit in Pisa with her father, she made a separate visit to her uncle Henry Stuart who was at Perugia. There she was successful in arranging a reconciliation between Henry and Charles.

=== Final months and death ===
In December 1785, she enlisted the help of Henry Stuart to get Charles back to the Palazzo Muti in Rome. On arrival in Rome with her father, the Pope welcomed Charlotte as the "Duchess of Albany". In Rome, Charlotte remained her father's carer and companion, and did her best to make his life bearable until he died of a stroke two years later on 30 January 1788. Her sacrifice for him was considerable—she was torn between an evident affection for her father in Rome and her mother and children left behind in Paris. On her father's death, the French court awarded her a pension of 20,000 livres. Charlotte inherited much of her father's property, including his Florentine residence, furniture and ornaments, although many of the Sobieski family jewels passed to Henry Stuart. She subsequently sold the Florentine palace and much of the possessions.

Charlotte would spend much of her final months in the company of Henry Stuart. She also became godmother to Countess Mary Norton, a member of her court. Charlotte also wrote to her mother about her worsening health, noting that she had a swelling and pain when breathing. She made several trips to improve her health at spa towns, including at Nocera in Umbria and at Bologna where she sought medical treatment. Charlotte was to survive her father by only twenty-two months and never saw her children again. On 9 October 1789, while staying in Bologna at the Palazzo Vizzani Sanguinetti, the home of her friend the Marchesa Giulia Lambertini-Bovio, a relative of Pope Benedict XIV, she died there, aged 36, of liver cancer. In her will, written just three days before her death, Charlotte left her mother a sum of 50,000 livres and an annuity of a further 15,000. Her physical possessions, jewels and other personal property passed to Henry. However, it was two years before Henry Stuart, her executor, and now considered by Jacobites to be King Henry IX, would release the money. Indeed, he only agreed to do this when Clementina signed a "quittance" renouncing, on behalf of herself and her descendants, any further claim on the estate. Charlotte was buried in the Church of San Biagio, near where she died, as she had requested in her will. When the church was pulled down by the French in 1797, Charlotte's remains were believed to have been moved to the Oratorio della Santissima Trinità in 1801; however, this was not verified. When it closed in 1961, her monument, and possibly her remains, were also moved to the nearby Chiesa della Santissima Trinità but again it is not known for certain where her remains lie.

== Legacy ==
For many years, Charlotte's children remained unknown to history, and it was believed that the direct line of James II and Mary of Modena ended with the death of Henry in 1807. However, in the 1950s, research by the historians Alasdair and Hetty Tayler revealed the existence of two daughters and a son. The historian George Sherburn then discovered the letters from Charlotte to her mother from which he wrote his biography of Charles Edward.

=== Children ===
It appears that Clementina lived on in Fribourg, Switzerland, until her death in 1802 and that it was she who reared Charlotte's children in deliberate anonymity. Their identities were concealed by a variety of aliases and ruses and were not even being mentioned in Charlotte's detailed will, which makes reference only to Clementina and to Charlotte's desire that Clementina might be able to provide for "her necessitous relations". The reason that the children remained secret can be explained by the fact that the relationship between Archbishop Ferdinand de Rohan and Charlotte, who had been forbidden to marry, was highly illicit and would have been scandalous. The girls, arguably Victoire Adélaïde (born between 1781 and spring 1783) and Charlotte Maximilienne Amélie (born 1780), were thought to have been placed in the care of Thomas Coutts, the London banker, and a distant relative of the Walkinshaws. They remained in anonymity and were believed to have been simply absorbed into English society.

Charlotte's son Charles Edward (born in Paris in 1784) followed a different path. Calling himself Count Roehenstart (Rohan+Stuart), he was educated by his father's family in Germany and became an officer in the Russian army and a general in the Austrian service. He travelled widely by visiting India, America, and the West Indies before he came to England and Scotland. He told such tall tales of his origins and adventures that few believed his claims to royal descent. Indeed, it was not until the 20th century that the historian George Sherburn established that he was indeed who he had claimed to be.He died in Scotland in 1854 as the result of a coach accident near Stirling Castle and was buried at Dunkeld Cathedral, where his grave can still be seen. He married twice but had no issue.

It was generally believed that Charlotte's daughters also died without issue, but Peter Pininski believed that Charlotte's daughter, (Marie) Victoire Adélaïde, had issue. Pininski's 2002 book suggested that Jules-Hercule, Prince de Guéméné and Duke of Montbazon, the elder brother of Ferdinand de Rohan (and aide-de-camp to Henry Stuart in 1745) recognised Charlotte's offspring as his own, which gave her status in that tight family, and he claimed that in 1793, at the outbreak of the French Revolution, Marie Victoire de Rohan went to relatives in Poland and there met and married Paul Anthony Louis Bertrand de Nikorowicz, a Polish nobleman and son of a banker. They had a son, Antime, and she later died in Vienna in 1836. Antime was the father of Charles and a daughter, Julia-Thérèse, who married Count Leonard Pininski and became Peter Pininski's great-great-grandmother. Pininski's evidence for his thesis has been described as "often indirect, if not elliptical". The Rohans were a large family, and it is easy to confuse its many members. A former chairman of the Royal Stuart Society, however, stated that Pininski's evidence seemed "genuine", and the peerage editor Hugh Massingberd described it as "painstakingly researched ... proof to surely the most sceptical pedant's satisfaction".

Pininski's hypothesis is challenged by the genealogist Marie-Louise Backhurst in three articles in 2013, 2021 and 2023. Backhurst provides evidence that Charlotte's second daughter, who was always called Victoire Adélaïde, was married firstly at St Roch, Paris, in November 1804 to a military doctor, Pierre Joseph Marie de St Ursin, in the service of Napoleon. The marriage record has Victoire Adélaïde Roehenstart, daughter of Maximilien and his wife, Clementine Ruthven, the same parental record as her brother Charles. By St Ursin, she was the mother of Theodore Marie de St Ursin, who was born in Paris on 29 June 1809 and was resident in Paris in 1832. He had entered the seminary of St Sulpice at Issy in 1828 and been ordained a deacon there that year, but died a deacon, aged 29, at Castres, Tarn, on 6 August 1838. In 1823, his mother had married again, to the naval officer Corbet James d'Auvergne, brother of the adopted son of the Duke of Bouillon, and she eventually died at Nice in March 1871.

Backhurst has concluded that Madame Nikorowicz was actually Marie Victoire de Rohan, Mademoiselle de Thorigny (born June 1779), and more likely to have been the illegitimate daughter of Jules Hercule Mériadec, Prince de Rohan, brother of Ferdinand and thus a first cousin to Victoire Adélaïde and without the Stuart descent. Pininski had earlier argued that Backhurst's interpretation had been based on a destroyed document that was "reconstituted" seventy years later and that no document confirmed the birth of Marie Victoire's son.

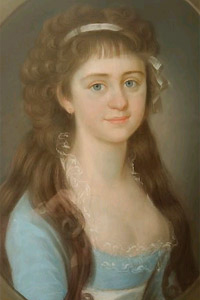
Marie Victoire de Thorigny, Madame Nikorowicz—perhaps Charlotte's daughter

Since then, Pininski has responded to Backhurst latest articles in a 2024 paper, in which he argues that every piece of evidence concerning Charlotte's three children is circumstantial, as their parentage is either false or not given in primary sources.

Pininski mentions that Charlotte's correspondence with her mother indicates the existence of a fourth child, Marie Aglaë, who has not been accounted for (and perhaps died young). He explains this by remarking that the idea Charlotte only had three children as indicated by her letters to her mother might be incorrect, since it could be that the children were not always together.

Furthermore, while he accepts that Marie Victoire and Victoire Adélaïde were probably different people, he rejects the possibility that the former might have been a natural daughter of Jules de Rohan. Pininski asserts that the two women were most likely siblings, both daughters of Charlotte Stuart and Ferdinand de Rohan. He maintains that the parentage of Madame Nikorowicz given in the baptismal record as Jules Hercule and Marie Grosset (the daughter of his secretary) seems to be fabricated, and refers to the refusal of the Abbé Barnabé of Veigné (near Tours) to baptise Charlotte's son, called Auguste Maximilian or Charles Edward, as a child of Jules as evidence.

According to Pininski, Jules Hercule was not known to have been unfaithful to his wife and would have been unlikely to sire Marie Victoire, as by 1779 he was 53 years old. Neither would he have had reason to recognize the child of "so humble a mother", nor grant her the prestigious style of "Demoiselle de Thorigny". Pininski also notes that when Marie Grosset was paid off by Jules de Rohan in 1782 for "services rendered" there was no mention of such a daughter. He argues that had she really been Jules's daughter the usual procedure would have been to register her with the French court, but he did not do that as it could have potentially revealed his younger brother's secret affair with Charlotte. Instead, he suggests that Jules Hercule might have been motivated by family loyalty to provide status to Charlotte and Ferdinand's illegitimate offspring.

Pininski states that the Nikorowicz clan seem to have had close ties to the Stuarts (through the Radiziwiłłs and even the House of Sobieski), but not to the House of Rohan. He speculates that Marie Victoire's marriage to Paul Nikorowicz may have been arranged by Ferdinand de Rohan through Charlotte's family connections. Furthermore, Charles Edward de Roehenstart ever only made one explicit reference to a sibling, when he was in financial difficulties in New York in 1813 and asked his one of his sisters for money. Pininski claims this could only have been Madame Nikorowicz (by then a rich widow), as Charlotte Maximilienne had died in childbirth in 1806, and, as pointed by Backhurst herself, Victoire Adélaïde had few resources of her own as the wife of a French military doctor imprisoned by the Russians.

Pininski observes that throughout her life Marie Victoire never mentioned her mother and that the only hint to her parentage comes from the family arms attributed to Madame Nikorowicz on an official genealogy provided by her great-grandson to the Habsburg court in the 1890s. He notes that her arms have "no similarity to those of Rohan, but instead display the Stuarts' fess on a gold shield, with only two minor modifications" comparable to the Stuart-based arms Charles Edward designed for himself.

Pininski concludes that Charlotte may have had four surviving children instead of three, and that perhaps they were divided in two sets of pairs. He points out that several facts of Marie Victoire's life indicate a close connection to Charles Edward, as they seem to have frequented the same Central and Eastern European emigré and ultraroyalist circles, and there are obscure references in his personal documents to de Roehenstart's Polish heirs. On the other hand, Charlotte Maximilienne and Victoire Adélaïde remained in France and both seem to have married middle-class men.

=== In Jacobite folklore ===
Charlotte Stuart's story did not take long to enter into the Jacobite folklore. The Scots poet, Robert Burns (1759–1796), a near contemporary, wrote a number of works celebrating the tragic romanticism of the Jacobite cause. Amongst them was The Bonnie Lass of Albanie, a lament to Charlotte Stuart that was probably written at the time of her death. Indeed, evidence from an unpublished collection of letters from Burns to Robert Ainslie reveals the poet's fascination with Charlotte in that he considered naming one of his own illegitimate children, Charlotte, after her. Burns wrote:

This lovely maid's of royal blood,
That ruled Albion's kingdoms three;
But Oh, Alas! for her bonnie face,
They hae wrang'd the lass of Albany.

== Sources ==
- Douglas, Hugh (2004) "Walkinshaw, Clementine, styled countess of Albestroff (c.1720–1802)", Oxford Dictionary of National Biography, Oxford University Press, doi:10.1093/ref:odnb/28523, retrieved 2007-12-14 (subscription required)
- Douglas, Hugh (1975). Charles Edward Stuart. London: Hale. ISBN 978-0709148159.
- Kybett, Susan Maclean (1988). Bonnie Prince Charlie: A Biography. London: Unwin. ISBN 978-0044403876.
- Magnusson, Magnus, Scotland: The Story of a Nation London, 2000 HarperCollins ISBN 0-00-653191-1
- McLynn, Frank (1988). Charles Edward Stuart: A Tragedy in Many Acts. London: Routledge. ISBN 979-8646825446.
- Pininski, Peter, The Stuarts' Last Secret Tuckwell Press, 2001 ISBN 1-86232-199-X
- Pininski, Peter (2010). Bonnie Prince Charlie. A Life. Amberley. ISBN 978-1-84868-194-1.
- Pittock, Murray G. H. (September 2004; online edn, May 2006) "Charles Edward (1720–1788)", Oxford Dictionary of National Biography, Oxford University Press, doi:10.1093/ref:odnb/5145, retrieved 2007-12-14 (subscription required)
- Sherburn, George (1960). Roehenstart: A Late Stuart Pretender. Being an Account of the Life of Charles Edward August Maximilien Stuart Baron Korff Count Roenenstart. Chicago: University of Chicago.
- Uilleam Stiùbhart, Domhnall, The cursed fruits of Charlie's loins? in The Scotsman 15 April 2005 (The Scotsman.com)
