= Charles Edward Stuart, Count Roehenstart =

Jacobite pretender

Charles Edward Augustus Maximilian Stuart, Baron Korff, Count Roehenstart (c. May 1784 – 28 October 1854) was the natural son of Prince Ferdinand of Rohan (1738–1813), Roman Catholic Archbishop of Cambrai, by Charlotte Stuart, Duchess of Albany, herself the natural daughter of Charles Edward Stuart, the "Young Pretender". She was legitimised after the birth of her children, and Roehenstart was later a passive Jacobite pretender to the British throne.

The name of "Roehenstart" given to him in infancy combined the names of both of his parents, Rohan and Stuart, while failing to proclaim their identity, which at the time would have been a cause for scandal.

Although he retired from military service as a lieutenant colonel, he is sometimes called "General" Charles Edward Stuart, and this title appears on his gravestone at Dunkeld.

== Life ==
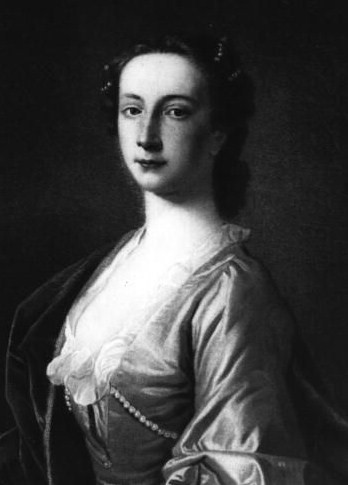
Roehenstart's grandmother, Clementina Walkinshaw, c. 1760

Roehenstart was baptised into the Roman Catholic faith on 13 May 1784 at the parish church of Saint-Merry in the rue de Saint Martin, Paris, when he was described as a son of Maximilian Roehenstart and of Clementine Ruthven. He was named Charles Edward after his royal grandfather. The letters of Roehenstart's mother to her own mother, Clementina Walkinshaw, provide evidence that this was one of her children, at least two daughters (but perhaps up to four) and one son, all fathered by Ferdinand de Rohan. The daughters were Charlotte Maximilienne Amélie, born during the summer of 1780, Victoire Adélaïde, born between 1781 and spring 1783, and possibly Marie Victoire, who was baptised at the Château de Couzières on 19 June 1779, as well as Marie Aglaë, who may be identical with one of her sisters or whose fate is otherwise unknown. The pregnancy with Roehenstart delayed Charlotte's plans to join her father in Florence, he having been kept in ignorance of all three children.

On 23 March 1783, the ailing Prince Charles Edward legitimised Charlotte, created her Duchess of Albany in the Jacobite Peerage, and made her heiress to some of his private property, but not his claim to the throne. She travelled to join him soon after the birth of Roehenstart, leaving her children behind in the care of her own mother, herself taking on the responsibility for nursing her father until his death on 31 January 1788. Less than two years later, on 17 November 1789, Charlotte herself died of cancer in Bologna.

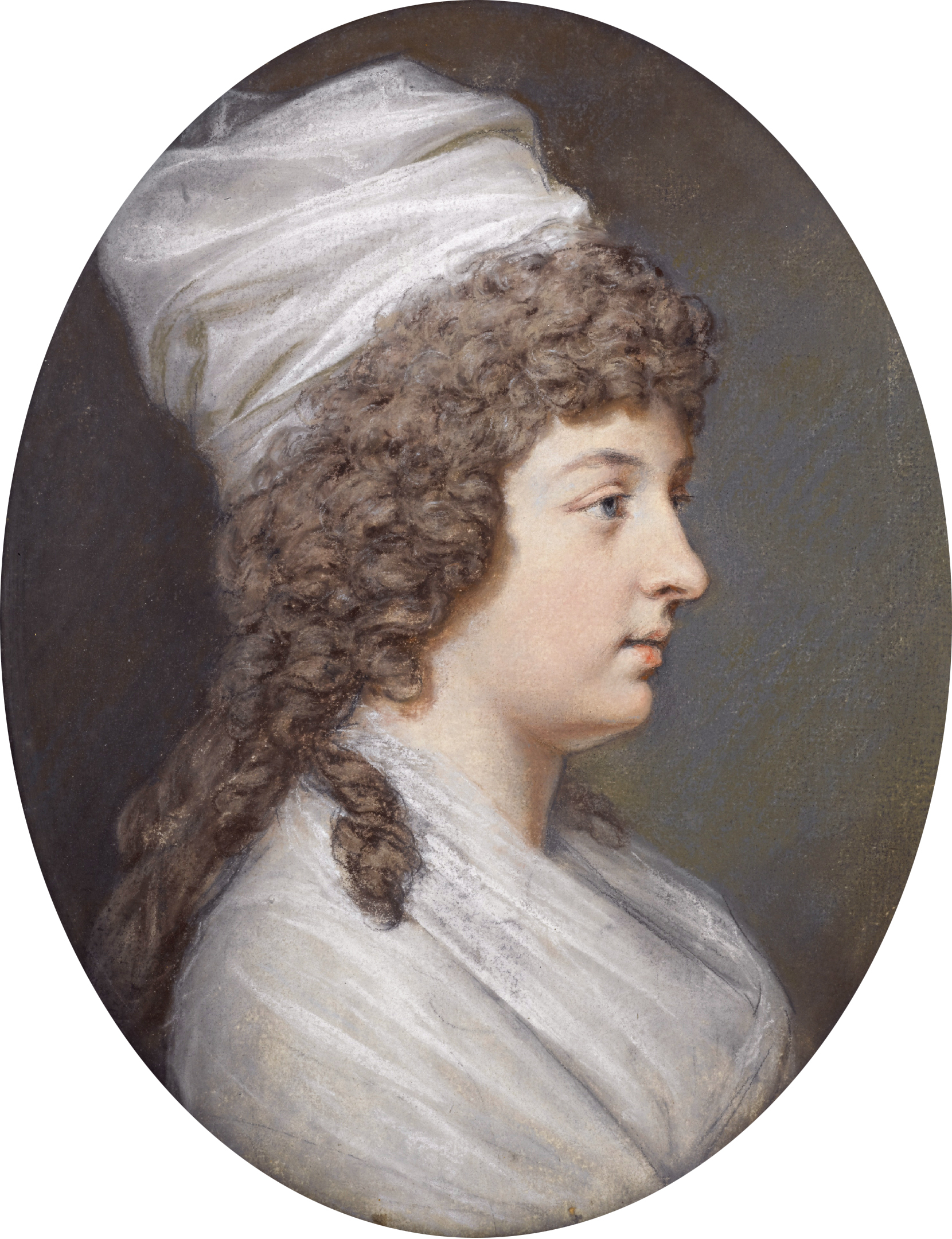
Roehenstart's mother, Charlotte Stuart

Roehenstart's grandmother Clementina Walkinshaw lived until 1802, in her later years taking up residence in Switzerland, and Roehenstart was raised in the reformed faith. During the years of the French Revolution, his father paid for his education in Germany. A substantial fortune should have come to Roehenstart from his grandmother, much of which on the recommendation of Thomas Coutts had been invested in London with Turnbull, Forbes & Co., but the firm had gone bankrupt in August 1802. Most of the remainder of his fortune, one hundred thousand roubles, was invested with a Russian banker named Sofniev.

In later life, Roehenstart stated that in 1800 he had been commissioned as an artillery officer of the Imperial Russian Army and had been promoted by 1803. On 8 August 1804, in Paris, he signed his name as a witness at the marriage of his sister Charlotte de Roehenstart to Jean-Louis de la Morlière. By 1806, he was no longer in the army, having resigned his commission as a lieutenant colonel, and had taken service in the household of Duke Alexander of Württemberg, who was Tsar Alexander I's Governor of White Ruthenia. In Saint Petersburg, Roehenstart was presented to the Tsarina, who was impressed by him. In 1811, he was offered the hand of an heiress, Marianna Hurko, but made the mistake of falling in love with her sister, Evelina, who was promised elsewhere. Unhappily, at about the same time Roehenstart's banker Sofniev failed, and Roehenstart was advised that he would recover only about five thousand roubles from the disaster. To the distress and anger of the Württembergs, he fled Russia, sailing from Kronstadt and arriving in London by November 1811. From there, he set sail for North America, in pursuit of John Forbes, a partner in Turnbull, Forbes & Co. who after the firm's failure had absconded to the United States with money Roehenstart believed to be rightfully his. He lived in Philadelphia from 1811 to 1813. He remained in America until 1814.

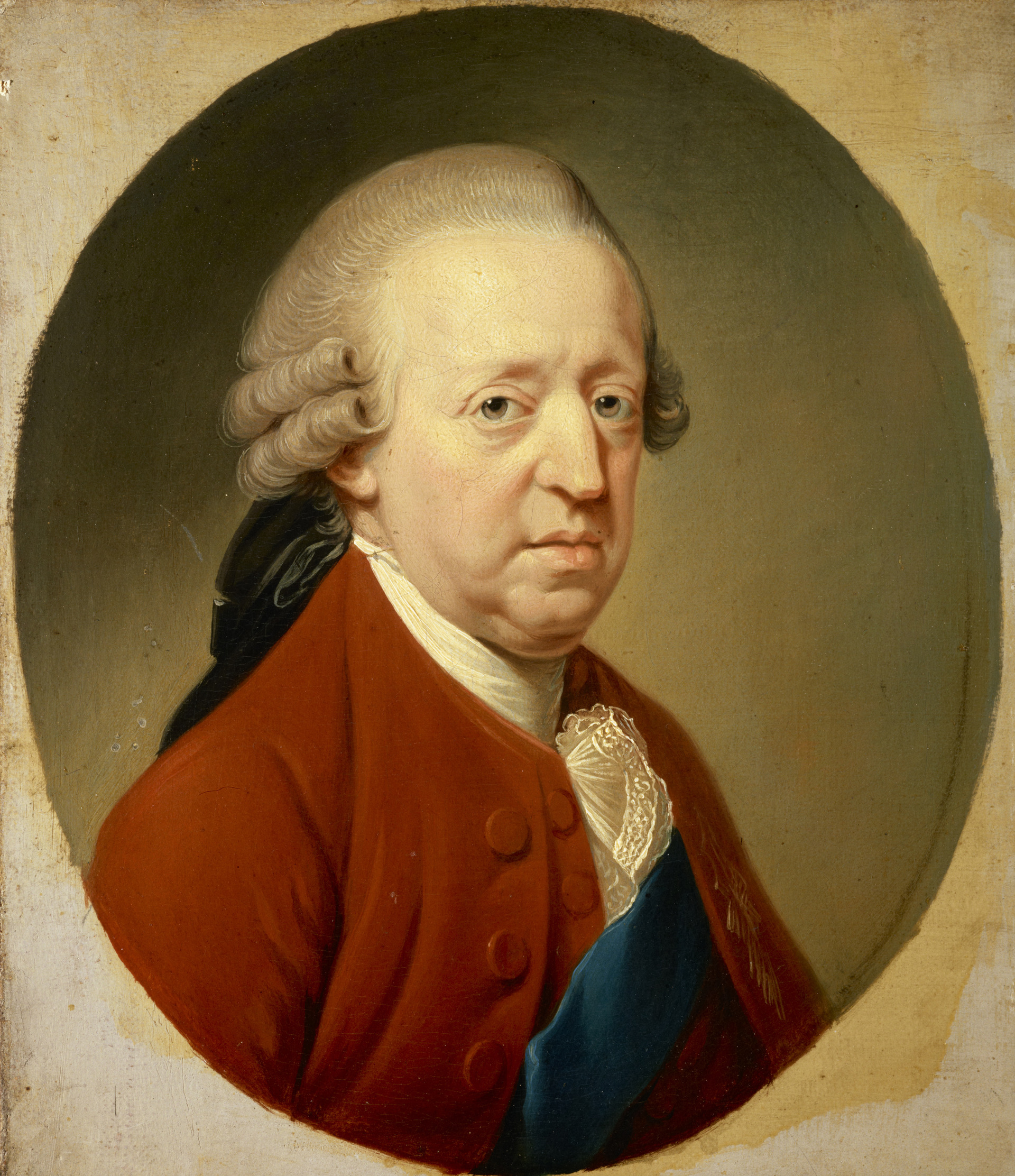
Roehenstart's grandfather, Charles Edward Stuart

In 1822, Forbes was living in Demerara, British Guiana, and successfully defended a claim made against him based on his firm's bankruptcy in 1802.

In 1816, after the conclusion of the Napoleonic Wars, Roehenstart went to Scotland and again to England, unsuccessfully renewing the Stuarts' pursuit of their old claim on the dowry of Queen Mary Beatrice of Modena, his great-great-grandmother.

In about 1820, Roehenstart married Maria Antonietta Sofia Barberini, the daughter of an exile said to be an Italian nobleman. She died the next year and on 20 July 1821 was buried under the name of "Countess Roehenstart" at Marylebone, London, her age at death being stated as thirty. On 13 December 1826, at St Pancras, London, he married secondly Louisa Constance Bouchier Smith, an Englishwoman possessing a modest fortune, the daughter of Joseph Bouchier Smith, sometime lord of the manor of Kidlington in Oxfordshire, who had recently died. Louisa Constance lived until 20 October 1853, dying at Paris, but there were no children of either marriage.

Following his second marriage, Roehenstart returned to continental Europe and spent much of the next twenty-five years travelling, usually without his wife, but they were settled permanently in his native Paris. In later life, Roehenstart spoke openly of his royal descent, but he became so boastful of his origins and adventures that few believed him.

In 1853, Roehenstart lost his wife, and in 1854 he revisited Scotland. While there he was fatally injured in a road accident, while travelling in a carriage which overturned. He was buried in the graveyard of Dunkeld Cathedral. His friends provided a modest headstone, with the inscription "Sacred to the memory of General Charles Edward Stuart Count Roehenstart who died at Dunkeld on the 28th October 1854 Sic transit gloria mundi".

In the twentieth century Roehenstart's papers came into the hands of the American scholar George Sherburn, who produced a comprehensive account of him from them.

== Claims to the throne ==
In order to lay a claim of his own to the British throne, Roehenstart maintained consistently that his grandfather Prince Charles Edward had married his grandmother, Clementina Walkinshaw, and also that his mother the Duchess of Albany had married a Swedish nobleman named Maximilian Roehenstart. The first is unlikely, although not an impossibility, but it lacks evidence; nothing has come to light to support the second claim, apart from Maximilian Roehenstart being named as Roehenstart's father when he was baptized in Paris; but there is no Swedish noble family named Roehenstart. On the contrary, Charlotte's relationship with Rohan is well evidenced.

Although he laid claim to the Jacobite succession, Roehenstart made no practical attempt to regain the throne of his Stuart ancestors. He did seek to maintain links with leading Scots and at the time of his death was returning from a visit to the Duke of Atholl at Blair Castle in Perthshire.

== See also ==
- Alternative successions to the English and British Crown

== Bibliography ==
- Helen Agnes Henrietta Tayler, Prince Charlie's Daughter: Being the Life and Letters of Charlotte of Albany (London: Batchworth Press, 1950)
- George Sherburn, Roehenstart: A Late Stuart Pretender: Being an Account of the Life of Charles Edward August Maximilien Stuart, Baron Korff, Count Roehenstart (Chicago: University of Chicago Press, 1960)
- Peter Pininski, The Stuarts' Last Secret: The Missing Heirs of Bonnie Prince Charlie (East Linton, Scotland: Tuckwell Press, 2002)
- Peter Pininski, Bonnie Prince Charlie: A Life (Amberley Publishing, 2010, ASIN B01FJ19KFK)
