= Clementina Walkinshaw =

Mistress of Bonnie Prince Charlie

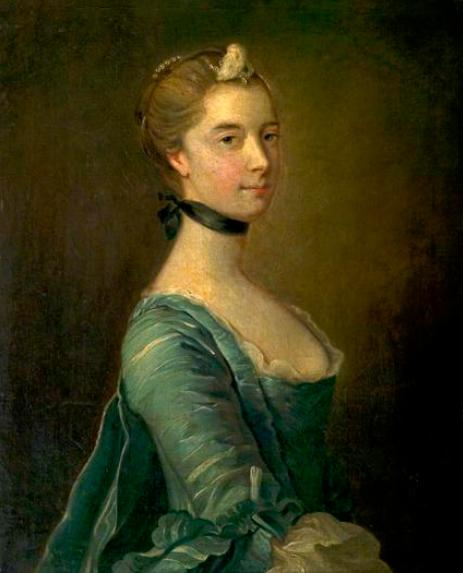
- Portrait by Allan Ramsay
- Born: 1720
- Died: 27 November 1802 (aged 81–82); Switzerland
- Known for: Mistress of Charles Edward Stuart
- Title: Countess of Albestroff
- Children: Charlotte Stuart, Duchess of Albany
- Parent(s): John Walkinshaw; Katherine Paterson

Clementina Maria Sophia Walkinshaw (1720 – 27 November 1802) was the mistress of the Jacobite claimant Charles Edward Stuart.

Born into a respectable Scottish family, Clementina began to live with the Prince in November 1752 and remained his mistress for eight years. Their child Charlotte was born in 1753. In 1760, the Prince's father, James Francis Edward Stuart, helped her escape with her daughter to a convent and began to support her. After his death in 1766 she had an allowance from Charles's brother Henry, Cardinal Duke of York. Charlotte's father legitimised her in 1783, and the next year she joined him in Florence and looked after him until his death. Charlotte died unmarried in 1789, leaving Clementina 50,000 livres and an annuity, but Henry insisted on Clementina signing a "quittance" renouncing any further claim.

Clementina Walkinshaw brought up her grandchildren (sired by Charlotte's lover, archbishop Ferdinand de Rohan) and lived until 1802, in her later years taking up residence in Switzerland.

== Childhood ==
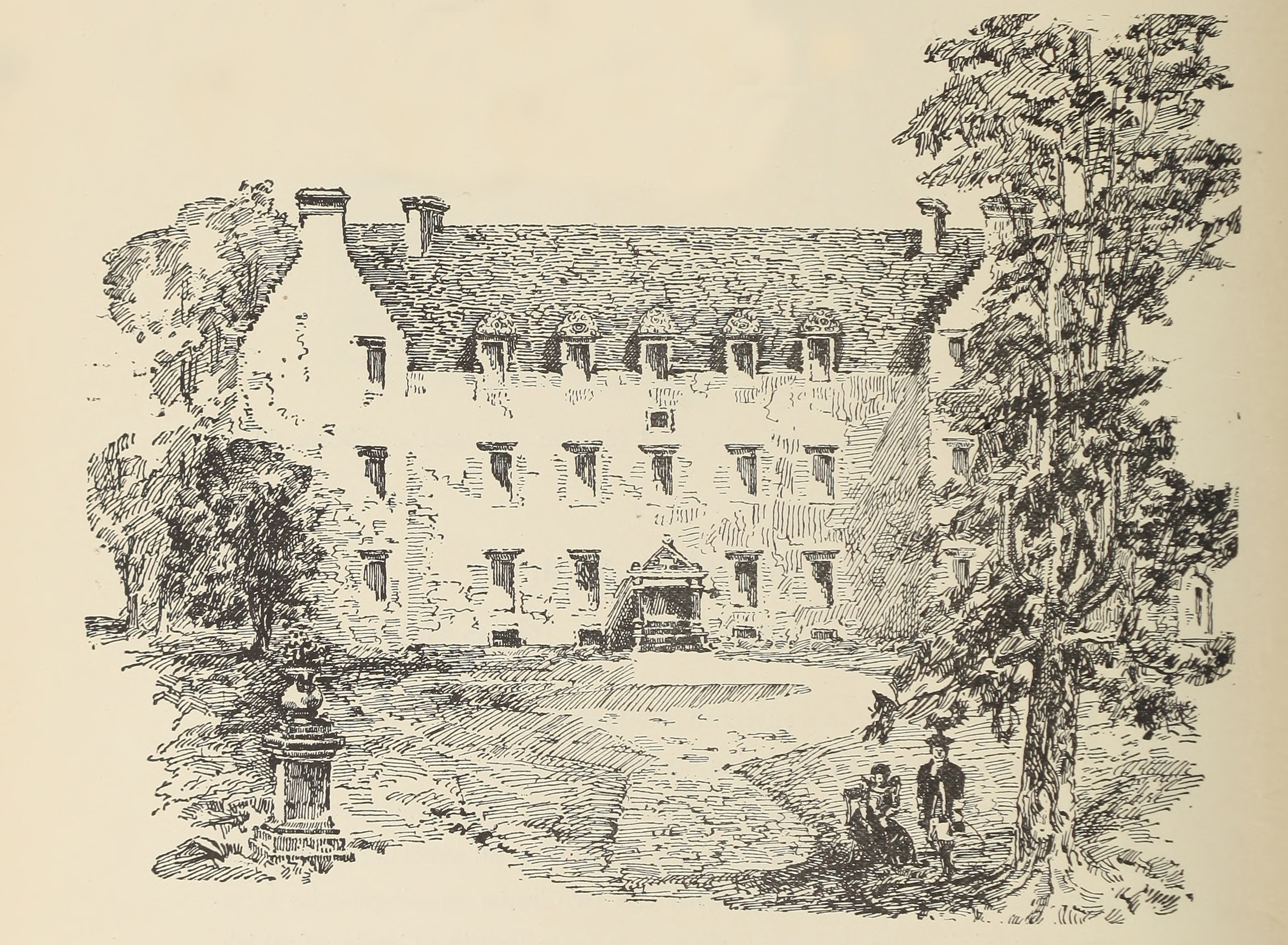
Bannockburn House, Stirlingshire, the seat of Clementina's uncle, where she was in residence by 1745

Clementina was the youngest of ten daughters of John Walkinshaw of Barrowfield and his wife Katherine Paterson, daughter of Sir Hugh Paterson, 1st Baronet. She grew up in Rome, possibly born thence, and as such would have known Charles from a young age; indeed, she was said to have been the goddaughter of his mother Clementina Sobieska. The Walkinshaws were Lanarkshire gentry who owned the lands of Barrowfield and Camlachie, and her father had become a wealthy Glasgow merchant. However, he was a committed Jacobite who had fought for James Francis Edward Stuart in the rising of 1715, and had been captured at the Battle of Sheriffmuir, before escaping from Stirling Castle and fleeing to Europe. Clementina was educated on the Continent, and later converted to Roman Catholicism. In 1746, she was living at the home of her uncle Sir Hugh Paterson at Bannockburn near Stirling.

== Relationship with Prince Charles Stuart ==
After the defeat of the Prince's rebellion at Culloden in April 1746, Charles fled Scotland for France. In 1752, he heard that Clementina, whom he had already met with her uncle, was at Dunkirk and in some financial difficulties, so he sent 50 louis d'ors to help her and then dispatched Sir Henry Goring to entreat her to come to Ghent and live with him as his mistress. Goring, who described Clementina as a "bad woman", complained of being used as "no better than a pimp", and shortly afterwards left Charles's employ. However, by November 1752, Clementina was living with Charles, and was to remain as his mistress for the following eight years. The couple moved to Liège where Charlotte, their only child, was born on 29 October 1753 and baptised into the Roman Catholic faith at the church of Sainte Marie-des-Fonts. Some contemporary accounts of British agents cite the birth of a baby boy and a second child.

The relationship between the Prince and Clementina was disastrous. Charles was already a disillusioned, angry alcoholic when they began living together, and he became violent towards Clementina and insanely possessive of her, treating her as a "submissive whipping post". Often away from home on jaunts, he seldom referred to his daughter, and when he did, it was as "ye cheild". During a temporary move to Paris, the Prince's lieutenants record ugly public arguments between the two, and that his drunkenness and temper was damaging his reputation. By 1760, they were in Basel, and Clementina had had enough of his intoxication and their nomadic lifestyle. She contacted Charles's staunchly Roman Catholic father James Stuart ('the Old Pretender') and expressed a desire to secure a Catholic education for Charlotte and to retire to a convent. James agreed to pay her an annuity of 10,000 livres and, in July 1760, there is evidence to suggest he aided her escape from the watchful Charles, with the seven-year-old Charlotte, to the convent of the Nuns of the Visitation in Paris. She left a letter for Charles expressing her devotion to him but complaining she had to flee in fear of her life. A furious Charles circulated descriptions of them both, but it was to no avail.

== Life with her daughter ==
For the next twelve years, Clementina and Charlotte continued to live in various French convents, supported by the 10,000 livre pension granted by James Stuart. Charles never forgave Clementina for depriving him of "ye cheild", and stubbornly refused to pay anything for their support. On 1 January 1766 James died, but Charles, now considering himself de jure Charles III of Scotland, England and Ireland, still refused to make any provision for the two, forcing Clementina, now styling herself as the Countess of Albestroff, to appeal to his brother Cardinal Henry Stuart for assistance. Henry gave them an allowance of 5,000 livres, but in return extracted a statement from Clementina that she had never been married to Charles – a statement she later tried to retract. This lower amount forced them to find cheaper lodgings in the convent of Notre Dame at Meaux-en-Brie.

Towards the end of 1772, Clementina and Charlotte unexpectedly arrived in Rome to press their desperate cause in person. The trip had pushed Clementina further into debt. The Prince reacted angrily to their arrival, refusing even to see them, forcing their helpless return to France, from where Charlotte's pleading letters continued.

== Later life ==
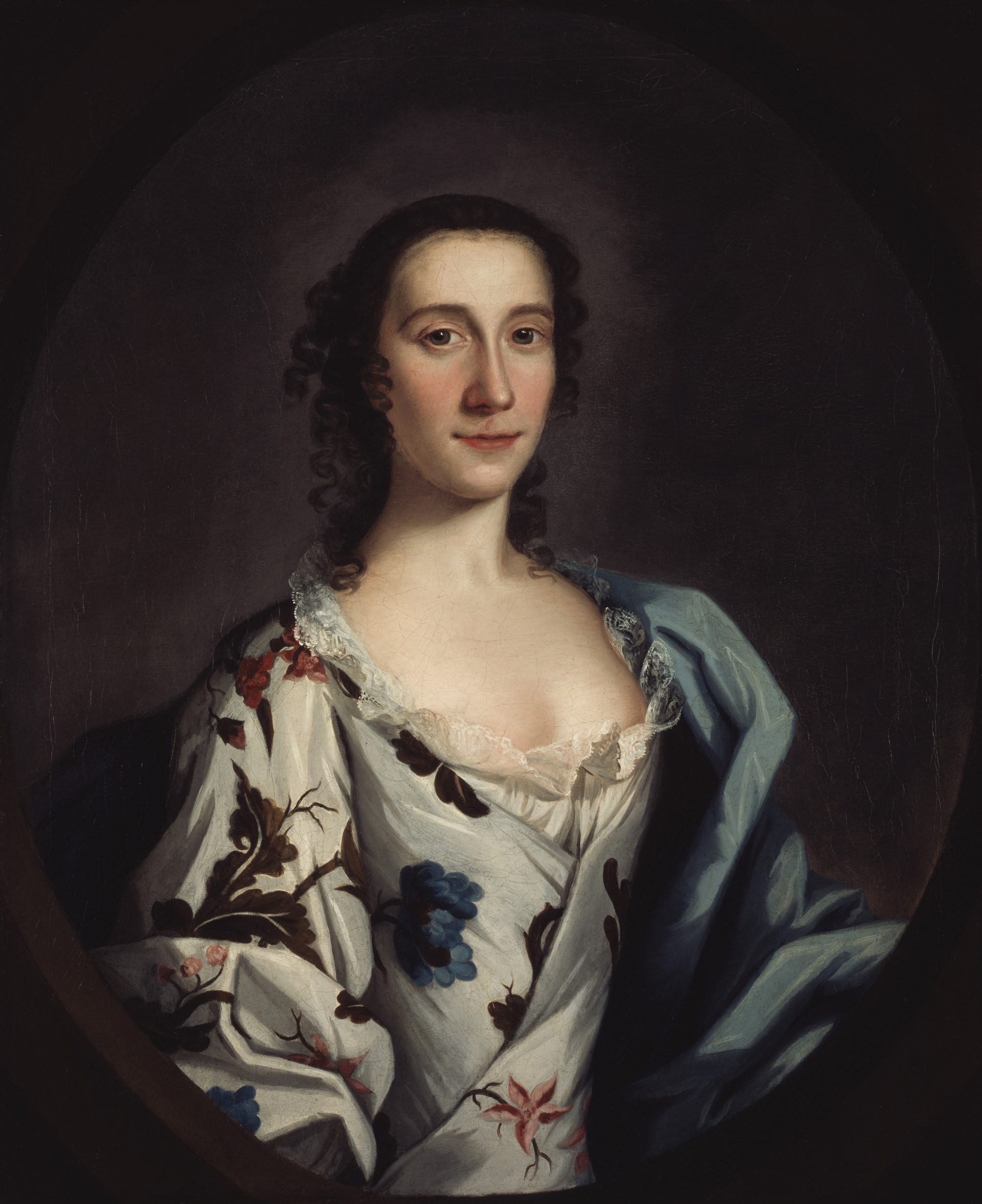
Portrait by an unknown artist, c.1740–1745, National Galleries of Scotland

In 1783, Charlotte, Clementina’s daughter, finally became legitimised and was allowed to see her father. Charlotte, in need of money for her and Clementina, settled with her father in Florence as his caretaker. Charlotte left Clementina her children to take care of while Charlotte was in Florence.

On 17 November 1789, Charlotte died unmarried at age 36 of liver cancer at Palazzo Vizzani Sanguinetti, a Renaissance palace located in Bologna. In Charlotte’s will, written three days before her death, stated that Clementina would be left 50,000 livres and an annuity of 15,000. However, Cardinal Henry Stuart would ‘release’ the money; he had only agreed to do so if Clementina would sign an quittance, renouncing any former claim upon the estate for both her and her descendants.

Clementina Walkinshaw looked after her illegitimate grandchildren and lived until 1802, in her later years taking up residence in Switzerland and bringing up her grandson Roehenstart in the reformed faith. During the years of the French Revolution, his father paid for his education in Germany. On her death, she left him a substantial fortune.

== In culture ==
She is a minor character in the novel Redgauntlet (1824) by Sir Walter Scott.

Scottish singer-songwriter Brian McNeill composed the song "How the Foreign Winds Do Blaw" on his tenth studio album The Baltic tae Byzantium about Walkinshaw.

== Notes ==
=== Sources ===
- Kybett, Susan Maclean (1988). Bonnie Prince Charlie:An Autobiography. London: Unwin. ISBN 0-04-440387-9.
