= Pompeo Vizzani =

Italian historian (1540-1607)

Pompeo Vizzani (24 June 1540 - 8 August 1607) was an Italian historian, narrating chronicles of his native Bologna.

Born to a non-senatorial family of Bologna, his brothers were Camillo (1542-1566) and Giasone (1538-1618) Vizzani. His initial history of Bologna (ending in 1530) in ten volumes was published in 1602. Two further volumes were published in 1608 about the history until 1599.
