= Palazzo Vizzani Lambertini Sanguinetti =

Coordinates: 44.48975023382999°N 11.35053030790462°E

The Palazzo Vizzani Lambertini Sanguinetti, sometimes known merely as Palazzo Vizzani, is a Renaissance palace located on Via Santo Stefano #43 in the center of Bologna, region of Emilia-Romagna, Italy. Presently the palace houses the faculty of Foreign Languages and Literature of the University of Bologna.

== History ==
The building was erected between 1559 and 1566 using designs of Bartolomeo Trianchini, and commissioned by Elisabetta Bianchini, widow of Camillo Vizzani, a member of the senatorial Vizzani family. The facade has a portico fronted by doric columns surmounted with an elegant frieze. The interiors were decorated with frescoes depicting classic mythology by Orazio Samacchini, allegories of the feats of Lorenzo Sabbatini, and a series of the Life of Cyrus by Pellegrino Tibaldi, and the about the Charity of Alexander the Great by Tommaso Laureti.

In the house would live the prominent Bolognese historian, Pompeo Vizzani. The palace once held numerous movable paintings and artworks, and a large library. In the library were kept numerous instruments and maps that served the meetings of the literary and scientific society, the Accademia degli Oziosi, which was founded by Pompeo. In 1691, bereft of Vizzani heirs, the palace became property of Senator Francesco Ratta, and in 1726 of marchesa Elisabetta Bentivoglio, and in 1732, of Cardinal Lambertini, the future Pope Benedict XIV. The Lambertini family expanded the palace, utilizing Carlo Lodi and Felice Giani, to paint further frescoes.

The palace had a number of owners in the 19th-century after the death of Giovanni Lambertini ni 1806. It was owned by the Ranuzzi family (1882) and the aristocrat Lodovico Sanguinetti (1893).
