= George Sherburn =

American scholar (1884–1962)

George Wiley Sherburn (1884 – November 28 1962) was an American scholar of eighteenth-century English literature. He was a specialist of Alexander Pope. He was an English professor at Harvard University and chairman of the Harvard English Department from 1945 to 1947.
