= Charles Wogan =

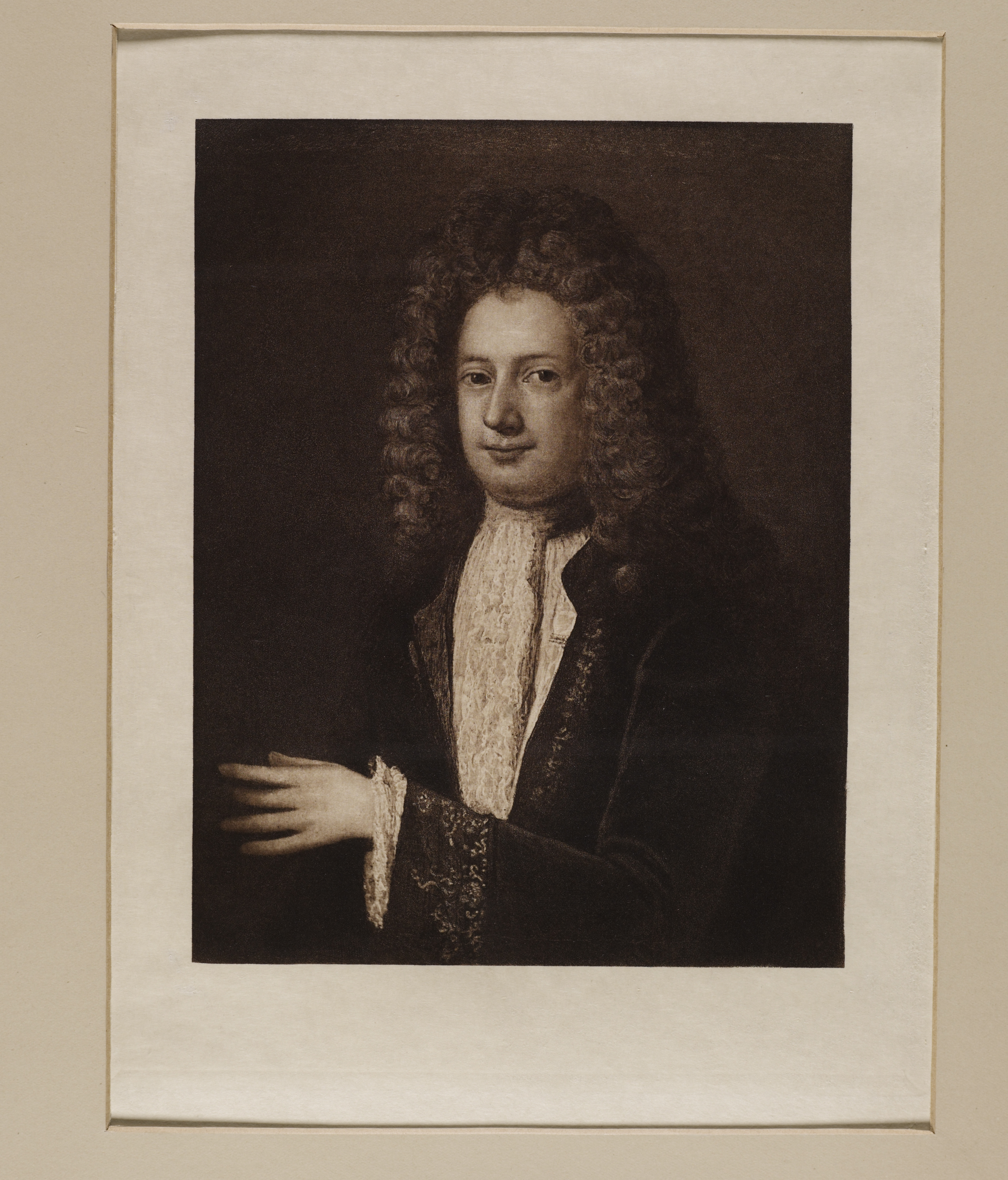
Charles Wogan, engraving from a Jacobite broadside

Charles Wogan (1684–1754) was an Irish Jacobite soldier and agent, also known as the Chevalier Wogan.

== Early life ==
Wogan was brought up in County Kildare, but the family details are unclear. The Oxford Dictionary of National Biography states that he was the eldest son of Patrick Wogan and his first wife, Mary Dempsey, and grandson of Nicholas Wogan of Rathcoffey Castle; while the Dictionary of Irish Biography states that he was the second son of William Wogan and his wife Anne Gaydon. As William Wogan had died in or before 1672, he is unlikely to have been Charles Wogan's father (see Hugh A. Law, op. cit.). Cruickshanks and Erskine-Hill comment on two "Nicholas Wogans (one the eldest son of Wogan of Rathcoffee and the other his cousin, the brother of Sir Charles Wogan ...)".

== Jacobite soldier ==
At the time of the 1715 Jacobite rebellion, Charles Wogan was involved in the organisation of the rising in Northern England in support of James Stuart, the Stuart claimant to the thrones of Great Britain and Ireland. With him was a NIcholas Wogan, who was probably a cousin and not Charles Wogan's brother (who was aged only 15 at the time).

Charles Wogan served as aide de camp to Thomas Forster, commander of that insurgency. A leading member of Forster's force was Colonel Henry Oxburgh. The Jacobites surrendered to General Charles Wills at Preston on 14 November.

In the following April the grand jury of Westminster found a true bill against Wogan, and his trial for high treason was appointed to take place in Westminster Hall on 5 May 1716. At midnight on the eve of the trial Wogan took part in the successful escape from Newgate prison planned by William Mackintosh of Borlum. He was one of the seven (out of the fifteen) who made good their escape, and for whose recapture a reward of £500 was offered. Nicholas did not manage to escape. As reported in The Political State of Great Britain vol XI (1716), p 554, and the London Evening Post, 1-4 June 1728, he was found guilty of treason but reprieved, because of his treatment of a Hanoverian officer who was mortally wounded at Preston, and eventually pardoned in 1728.

== Adventurer in France ==
Charles Wogan succeeded in getting to France, where he took service with James Stuart and, for a time, managed a clandestine operation in Lyon, France, for the secure transmission of Jacobite correspondence. In November 1717, Wogan was commissioned to tour the minor courts in Central Europe in search of a suitable bride for James Stuart. His efforts turned up a serious candidate in the form of Maria Clementina Sobieska, granddaughter of the famous John Sobieski. Clementina, on her way to join James Stuart at Bologna, was arrested by the order of the emperor (to whom the goodwill of the British government was of paramount importance) at Innsbruck, whence Wogan, with three kinsmen, Richard Gaydon, Captain Missett, Captain Luke O'Toole, Misset's pregnant wife, and her French maidservant released her in a romantic manner and escaped through the Alps to Bologna (27 April-3 May 1719). For this exploit the pope, Clement XI, conferred upon Wogan the title of Roman senator (13 June 1719). James rewarded Wogan with a baronetcy and the rank of colonel in James' forces (effectively an honorific rank).

== In the Spanish service ==
Wogan then took service as a colonel in the Spanish army (a rank for which James Stuart had lobbied the King of Spain). In 1732 he distinguished himself as the commander of the infantry component in the covering force protecting a convoy resupplying the fort of Santa Cruz, the key to Oran, then held by the Spanish and besieged by the Moors under the Bey Bigotillos. Wogan was wounded in the action and repatriated to Spain. His failure to obtain any recognition for his service during the siege of Oran led to his decision to retire from active service in 1735. In 1744 he was made corregidor (civil governor) of the San Clemente district of La Mancha, Spain.

The following year Wogan received a letter from Charles Edward Stuart, the Young Pretender, seeking Wogan's assistance for the Prince's projected invasion of Scotland (the 1745 Jacobite rising). Wogan went to the Spanish Court where he obtained financial and material support. He was promoted to the rank of brigadier-general and commanded a contingent of Irish officers in the Spanish service who were sent to France to take ship for Scotland in order to join the Prince. In 1746 the Chevalier Wogan was with Henry, Cardinal Duke of York at Dunkirk, in the hope of being able to join Charles Edward.

The collapse of the rising meant that Wogan never arrived in Scotland. He was recalled to Spain where he resumed his post of corregidor at San Clemente.

== Last years and death ==
Wogan stepped down from the position of corregidor of San Clemente a few years after his return to Spain in 1746 and was posted to the staff of the garrison of Barcelona in 1750. He died there in 1754.

== Correspondence ==
In 1732 Wogan sent to Jonathan Swift a parcel of his writings with a view to their publication. Swift wrote him in return a letter deploring that he did not see his way to get Wogan published: "Dublin booksellers", he says, "have not the least notion of paying for copy." On 27 February 1733 Wogan despatched to Swift, in his capacity as the "mentor and champion of the Irish nation," a long collection of grievances and a cask of Spanish wine, which Swift acknowledged in another letter.

In correspondence with Swift, Wogan claimed an early friendship with Alexander Pope (1688-1744) and the Irish poet, Thomas Parnell (1679-1718). In detail, Wogan and Swift shared a 'retreat' in Windsor Forest for two or three summers (during that time, Wogan, as he stated, helped Pope dress fashionably, and took him to Will's Coffee House); and Wogan was a friend and neighbour of Parnell, probably while Parnell was resident in London, from 1711 or 1712.
