= Maria Clementina Sobieska =

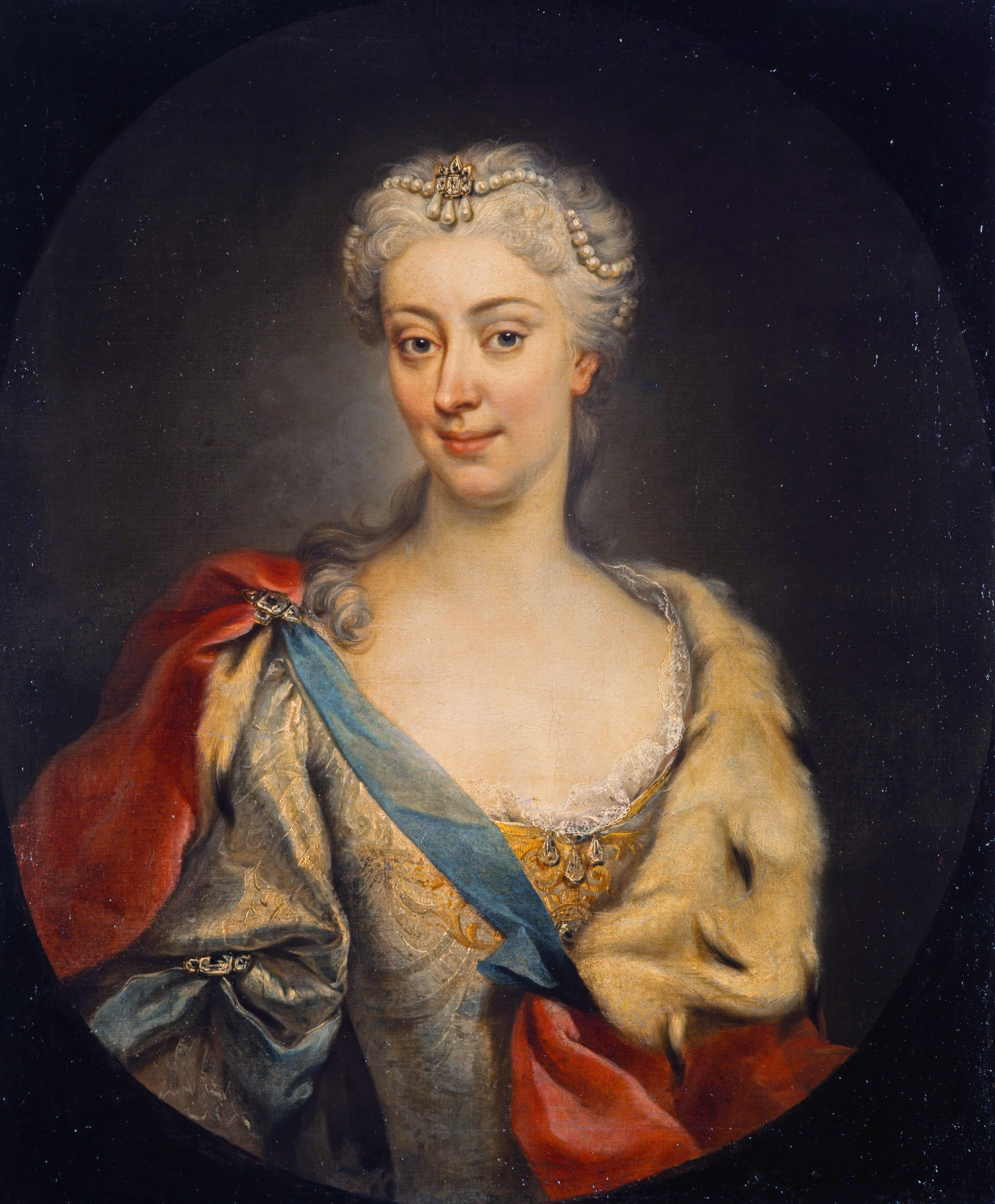
- Martin van Meytens (after), Maria Clementina Sobieska, 1727/28, Scottish National Gallery

Consort of the Jacobite pretender
- Pretence: 3 September 1719 – 18 January 1735
- Born: 18 July 1702; Oława, Duchy of Oława (Habsburg monarchy)
- Died: 18 January 1735 (aged 32); Palazzo Muti, Rome, Papal States
- Burial: St. Peter's Basilica, Rome, Italy
- Spouse: James Francis Edward Stuart (m. 1719)
- Issue: Charles Edward Stuart; Henry Benedict Stuart
Names
- English: Maria Clementina Sobieska; Polish: Maria Klementyna Sobieska
- House: Sobieski
- Father: Jakub Ludwik Sobieski
- Mother: Hedwig Elisabeth of Neuburg
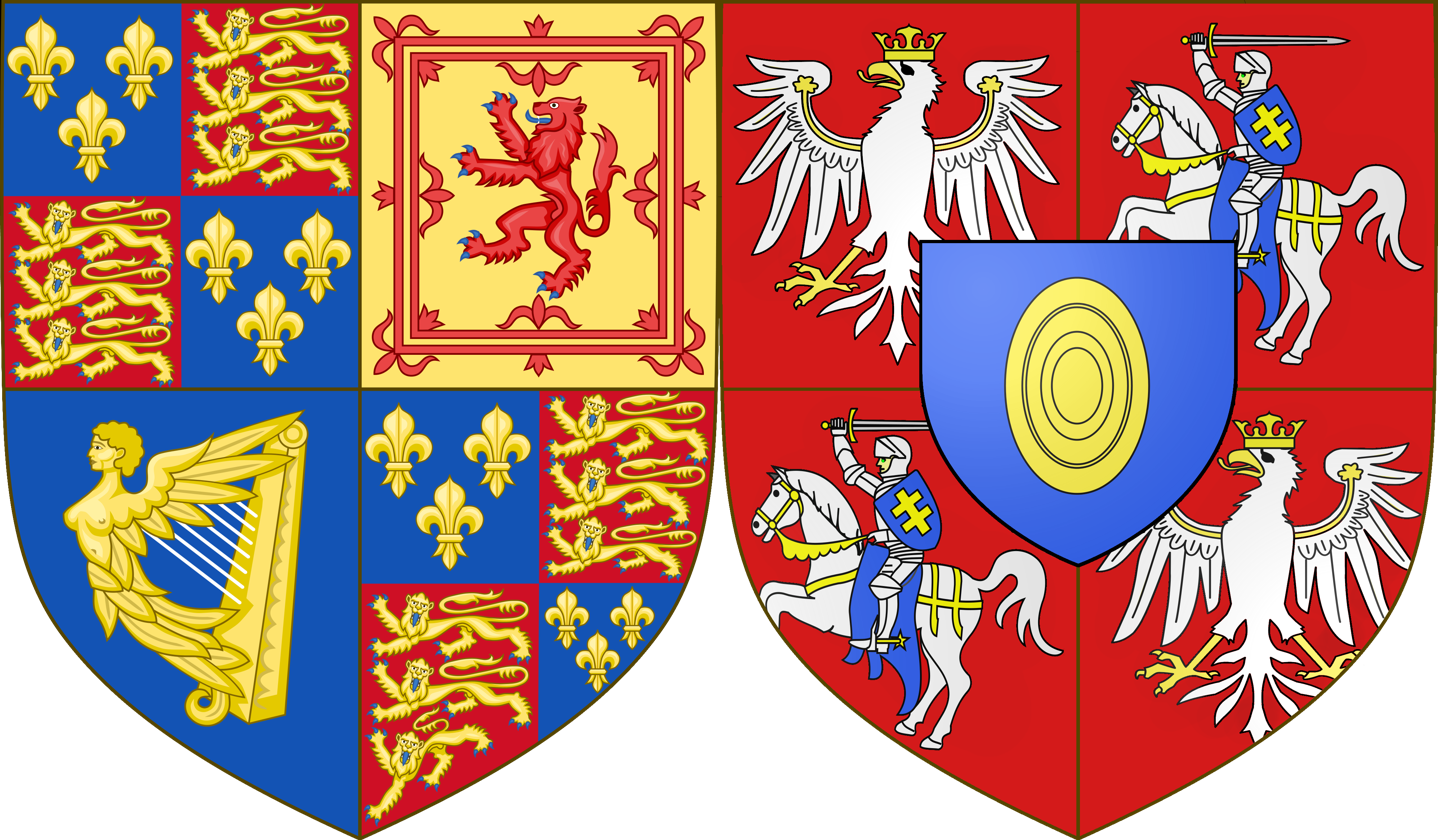
- Coat of arms of Maria Clementina Sobieska

Maria Clementina Sobieska (Polish: Maria Klementyna Sobieska; 18 July 1702 – 18 January 1735) was titular queen of England, Scotland, and Ireland by marriage to James Francis Edward Stuart, a Jacobite claimant to the thrones of the British Isles. A granddaughter of the Polish king John III Sobieski, she was the mother of Charles Edward Stuart ("Bonnie Prince Charlie") and of Henry Benedict Cardinal Stuart (Jacobite Duke of York, later Jacobite claimant).

== Biography ==
=== Early life ===
Maria Clementina Sobieska was born on 18 July 1702 in Oława, Silesia. Her parents were Prince Jakub Ludwik Sobieski, Duke of Oława, the eldest son of the Polish King John III Sobieski, and Countess Palatine Hedwig Elisabeth of Neuburg. At her baptism, she was given the names Maria Klementyna Ludwika Franciszka Dorota Teresa Konstantyna Józefa Amalia. The birth of Maria Clementina was a disappointment to her parents, who had been expecting a male heir, as Maria Clementina was the couple’s fourth daughter. Moreover, less than a year earlier, on November 3, 1700, their one-year-old son, Prince Jan Józef, had died. The princely couple never had another male heir. In 1704, another daughter was born, but she died on the day of her birth. Maria Klementyna remained the youngest daughter and became the family’s favorite, especially of her father, Jakub Ludwik. John III Sobieski was famous for his victorious Battle of Vienna against the Ottoman Turks on 12 September 1683.

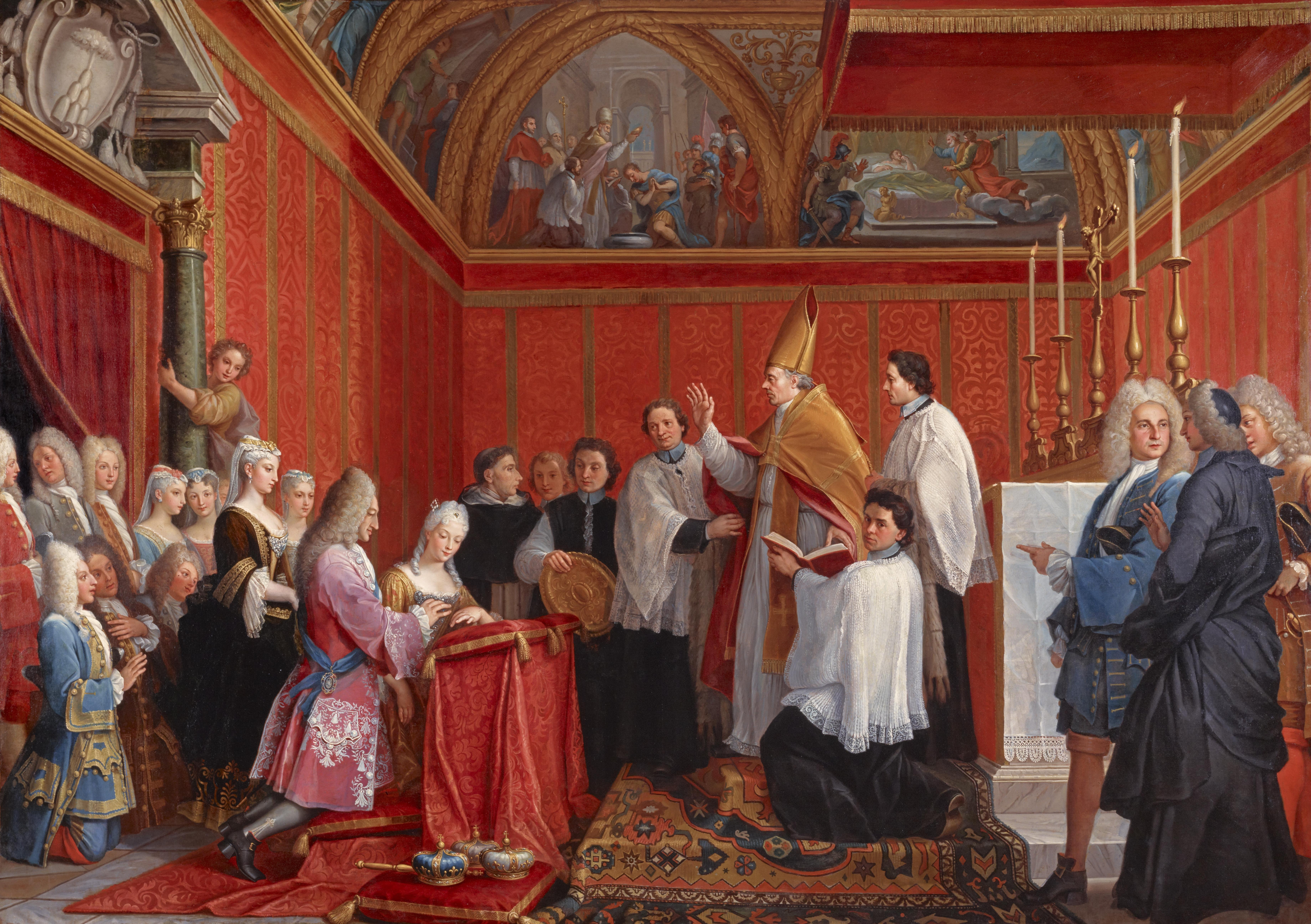
The Solemnisation of the Marriage of James III and Maria Clementina Sobieska by Agostino Masucci

=== Marriage ===
Being one of Europe's wealthiest heiresses from inheriting vast estates in Poland from her paternal grandfather, she was betrothed to James, Prince of Wales, the exiled son of James II and VII. King George I of Great Britain was opposed to the marriage because he feared that the union might produce heirs to James Francis Edward's claim to his thrones. To placate him, Charles VI, Holy Roman Emperor (Maria Clementina's own maternal first cousin) had her arrested while on her way to Italy to marry James Francis Edward. She was confined in Innsbruck Castle but eventually the guards were deceived and, with the help of Charles Wogan, Maria Clementina escaped to Bologna, where, for safety from further intrusions, she was married by proxy to James, who was in Spain at that time. Maria Clementina's father approved her escape, declaring that, as she became engaged to James Francis Edward, she ought to "follow his fortune and his cause".

Maria Clementina and Prince James were formally married on 3 September 1719 in the chapel of the episcopal palace of Montefiascone, Italy, in the Cathedral of Santa Margherita. Following their marriage, James and Maria Clementina were invited to reside in Rome at the special request of Pope Clement XI, who acknowledged them as the king and queen of England, Scotland and Ireland.

=== Titular queen ===
The Pope provided them with a papal guard of troops and gave them the Palazzo Muti in the Piazza dei Santi Apostoli in Rome to live in, as well as a country villa at Albano. The Holy See also provided them with an annual allowance of 12,000 crowns out of the papal treasury. Popes Clement XI and Innocent XIII considered James and Maria Clementina, both Catholics, the rightful king and queen of England, Scotland and Ireland.

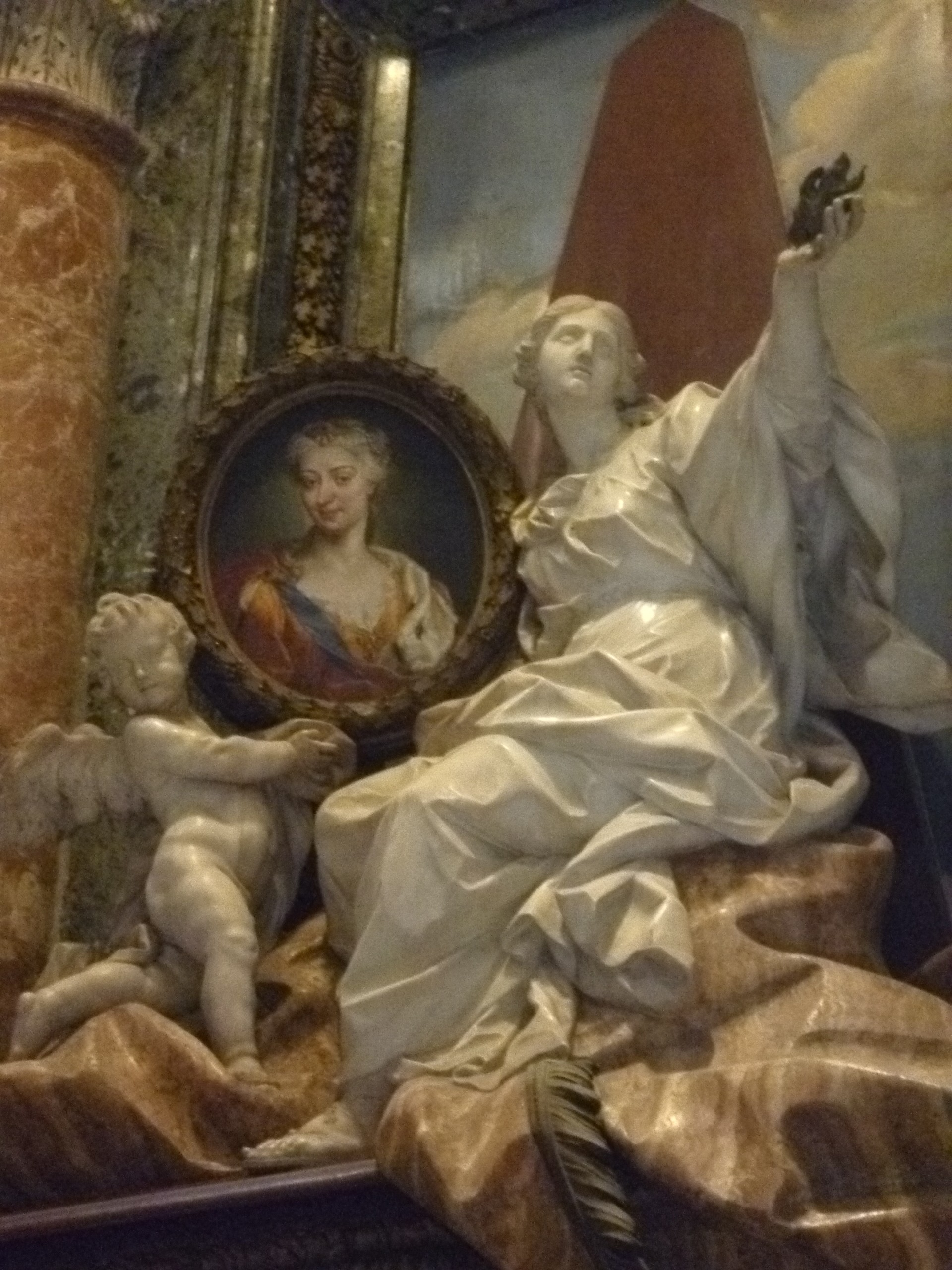
Memorial in St. Peter's, Rome

The married life of James and Maria Clementina proved turbulent and unhappy. Reportedly, James initially had a favourable impression of her because of her beauty, while she disliked him because of his lack of it, as well as his passive nature. She befriended her son's governess, a Mrs Sheldon, who became her confidant and favourite. On the other hand, she disliked the influence of James's favourite John Hay of Cromlix and his wife Marjorie and reportedly suspected James of having an affair with the latter.

In 1725, soon after their second child's birth, James dismissed Sheldon and, against Maria Clementina's wishes, appointed James Murray as the guardian of their sons. She then left him and took up residence in the convent of Santa Cecilia in Trastevere, in Rome, with her favourite Sheldon and the rest of her personal retinue.

Maria Clementina accused her husband of adultery, while James claimed it was sinful for her to leave him and their children. On the advice of Cardinal Alberoni, who claimed it was her only chance to gain support against her husband, Maria Clementina claimed that James wished to give his son a Protestant education. This claim secured her the support of the Pope as well as the Kingdom of Spain against James and the sympathy of the public when she demanded that James remove the Earl of Dunbar and the Hays from his court and reinstate Sheldon in her position. In April 1726, James granted her sons permission to visit her. The whole affair was seen as a scandal in Europe and reported about by anti-Jacobite agents in Rome. In May 1727, through the mediation of the duke of Liria, James removed the Hay couple from his court, and in January 1728, Maria Clementina and James were reconciled at Bologna.

In practice, however, Maria Clementina and James lived the rest of their marriage separated: James preferred to reside in Albano, while Maria Clementina lived in Rome at the Palazzo Muti. She was prone to depression, spending much of her time praying and undertaking religious fasting and other Catholic ascetic rituals, which is thought to have played a role in the fact that she never conceived again. Her sexual relations with James soon discontinued; they seldom dined together, and though they were officially reconciled, she preferred to avoid him outside formal occasions. Maria Clementina did perform the ceremonial functions she had as Jacobite queen: in June 1729, for example, she granted an audience to Montesquieu. Her favourite, Mrs Sheldon, did not officially reside at the Jacobite court, but was provided with a residence close to it, and remained a confidante. Maria Clementina's relations with her younger son was not close, as he was his father's favourite, but she was close to their elder son Charles, who was his mother's favourite. During an illness of Charles in 1732, for example, Maria Clementina tended to him despite the fact that he fell ill in Albano, which meant she could not avoid meeting James.

=== Death ===
Her health was weakened by her ascetic lifestyle and deteriorated as the years went by. Maria Clementina died at the early age of 32 on 18 January 1735. Her doctor named the cause of death as 'scorbutic disease', more commonly known as scurvy. She was interred with full royal honours in St. Peter's Basilica in Rome. Pope Clement XII ordered that she have a state burial. Pope Benedict XIV commissioned architect Filippo Barigioni to design a monument for her memory, Pietro Bracci sculpted a statue for it, and it was erected 1742 in the Basilica.

== Issue ==
Maria Clementina and James Francis Edward had two sons:

- Charles Edward Louis Philip John Casimir Stuart (31 December 1720 – 31 January 1788), aka "Bonnie Prince Charlie", married Louise of Stolberg-Gedern and had no issue; had affair with his cousin Marie Louise de La Tour d'Auvergne and had issue; had issue with his mistress Clementina Walkinshaw;
- Henry Benedict Maria Clement Thomas Francis Xavier Stuart (11 March 1725 – 13 July 1807), later known as the Cardinal Duke of York.

== Ancestry ==
Ancestors of Maria Clementina Sobieska

8. Jakub Sobieski
4. John III Sobieski
9. Zofia Teofila Sobieska
2. James Louis Sobieski
10. Henri Albert de La Grange d'Arquien
5. Marie Casimire Louise de La Grange d'Arquien
11. Françoise de La Châtre
1. Maria Clementina Sobieski
12. Wolfgang William, Count Palatine of Neuburg
6. Philip William, Elector Palatine
13. Magdalene of Bavaria
3. Hedwig Elisabeth of Neuburg
14. George II, Landgrave of Hesse-Darmstadt
7. Elisabeth Amalie of Hesse-Darmstadt
15. Sophia Eleonore of Saxony

== Gallery ==
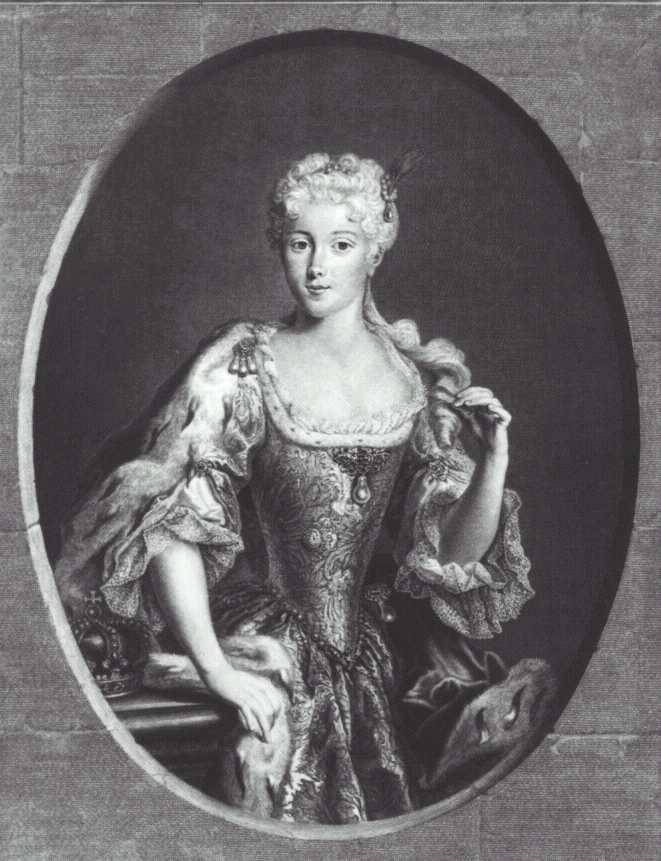
Maria Clementina by Pierre Imbert Drevet.

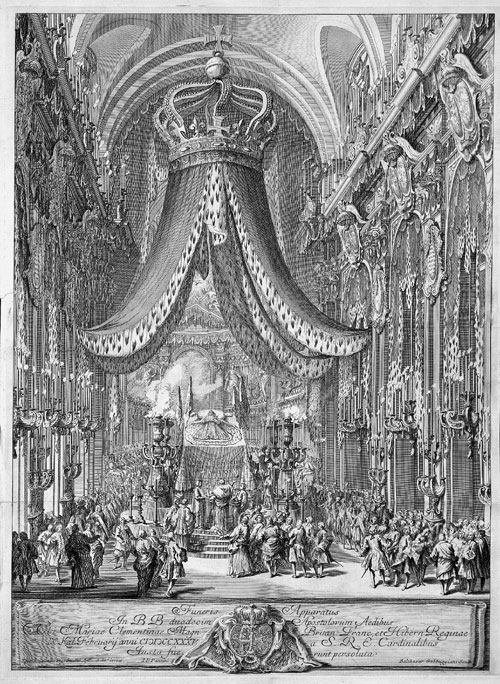
"Pompe funebre" for Maria Clementina at Rome.

Maria Clementina's Tomb by Barigioni and Bracci in St Peter's Basilica, Rome.

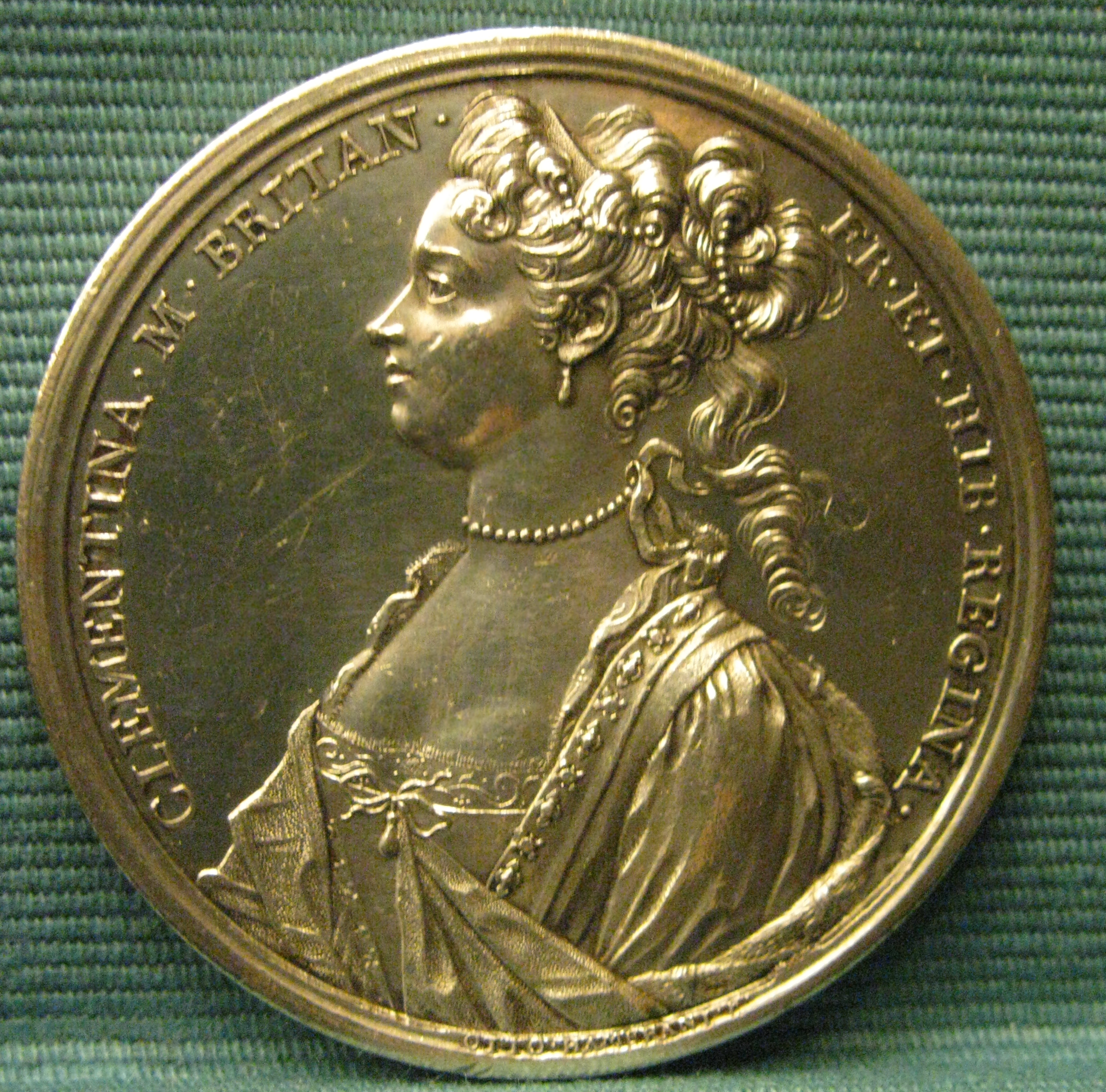
Medal commemorating Maria Clementina from 1719

== In fiction ==
A fictionalised re-telling of Maria Clementina's rescue from Innsbruck in 1719 forms the plot of A. E. W. Mason's 1901 novel Clementina.

Titles in pretence
Vacant Title last held by Mary of Modena	— TITULAR — Queen consort of England, Scotland, and Ireland; 1719–1735; Reason for succession failure: Glorious Revolution	Vacant Title next held by Louise of Stolberg-Gedern
