= Sir Hugh Paterson, 2nd Baronet =

Scottish Jacobite and Member of the Parliament of Great Britain

Hugh Paterson
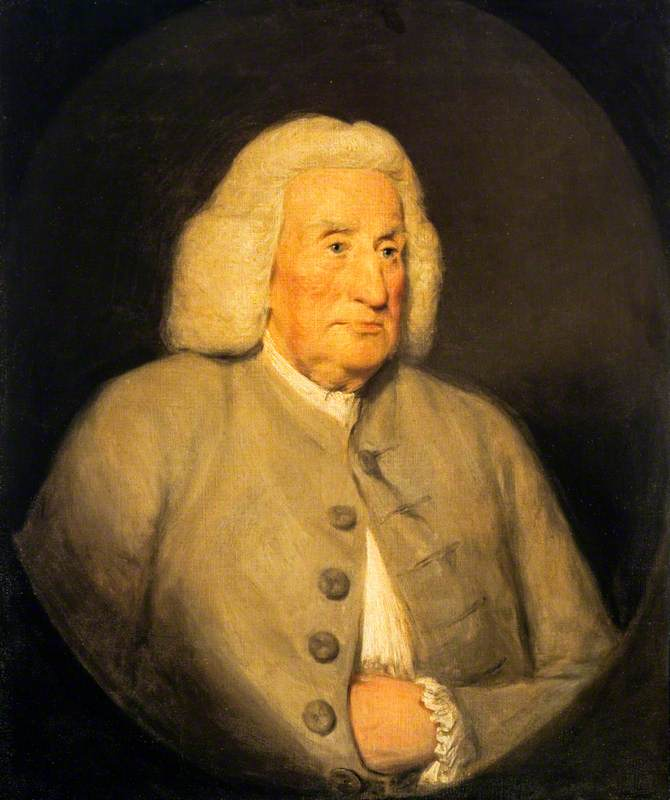
- Portrait by John Thomas Seton, 1776

Member of Parliament for Stirlingshire
- In office 1710–1715
- Preceded by: Henry Cunningham
- Succeeded by: Mungo Haldane

Personal details
- Born: 1685 Bannockburn, Stirlingshire, Scotland
- Died: 23 March 1777 (aged 91–92) Bannockburn, Scotland
- Spouse: Lady Jean Erskine
- Children: Henry Paterson (b. 1712), Mary Paterson (b. 1714)
- Occupation: MP
- Known for: Baronet of Bannockburn, Jacobite

Sir Hugh Paterson, 2nd Baronet (circa 1685 – 23 March 1777) was a Scottish Jacobite and Member of the Parliament of Great Britain.

The son of Sir Hugh Paterson, 1st Baronet by his wife Barbara, daughter of Sir William Ruthven of Dunglass and Katherine, daughter of William Douglas, 1st Marquess of Douglas, he succeeded his father as second Baronet, of Bannockburn, on 21 December 1702. From 1710 to 1715 he was Member of Parliament for Stirlingshire.

On 21 February 1712, he married Lady Jean Erskine, daughter of Charles Erskine, Earl of Mar. They had a son Henry, who predeceased his father.

In 1716, Paterson was attainted and his baronetcy forfeit, because, as a Jacobite, he had participated in the Jacobite Rising of 1715. His niece, Clementina Walkinshaw, later became the mistress of Prince Charles Edward Stuart.

Parliament of Great Britain
Preceded by Henry Cunningham	Member of Parliament for Stirlingshire; 1710–1715	Succeeded by Mungo Haldane
Baronetage of Nova Scotia
Preceded by Hugh Paterson	Baronet (of Bannockburn); 1702–1715	Forfeit
