= Ferdinand Maximilien Mériadec de Rohan =

French Catholic prelate (1738–1813)

- Archbishop Emeritus of Cambrai
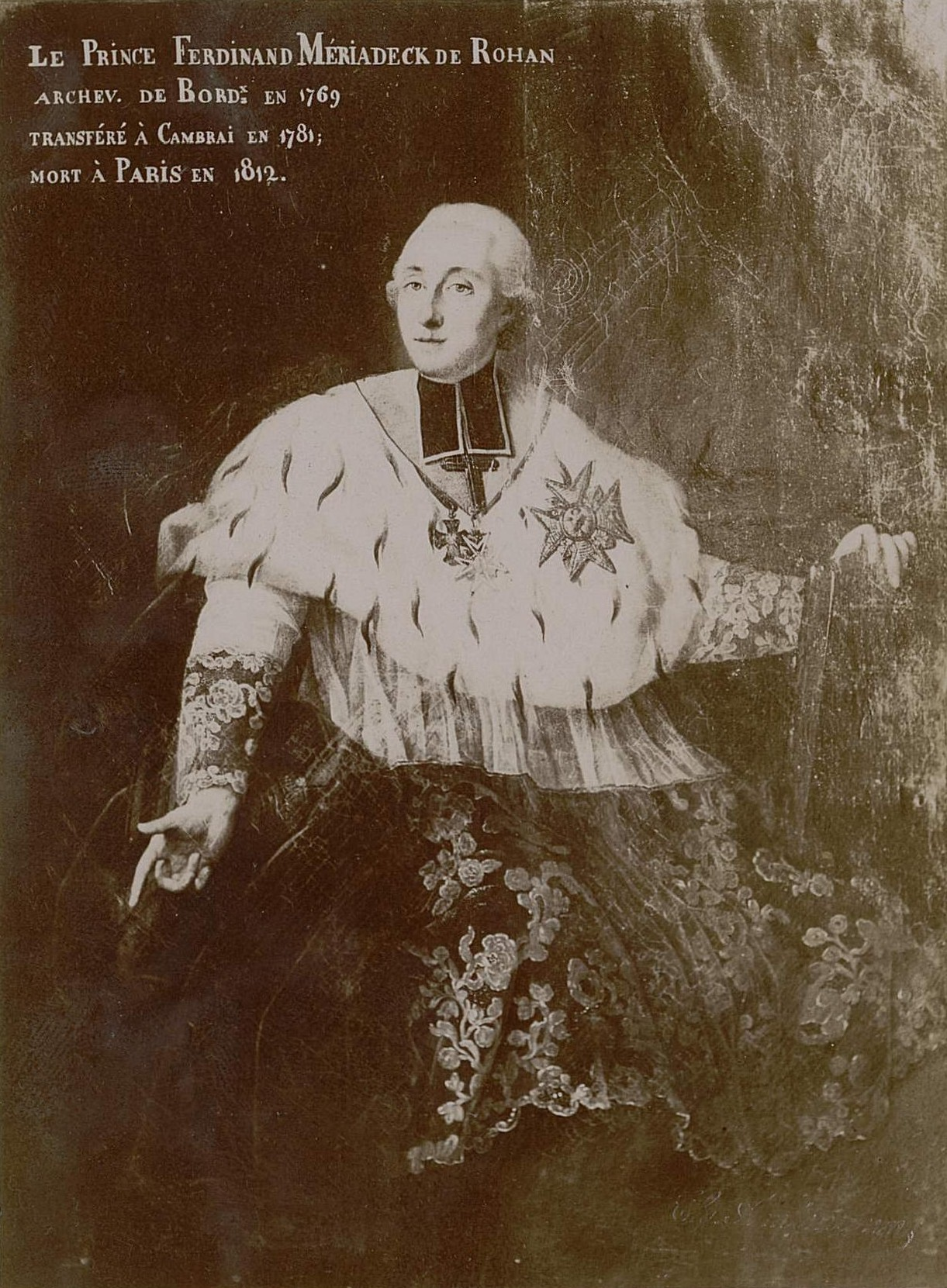
- Church: Roman Catholic
- Archdiocese: Cambrai
- Elected: 28 January 1781
- Term ended: 23 November 1801
- Predecessor: Henri-Marie-Bernardin de Ceilhes de Rosset de Fleury
- Successor: Louis Belmas
- Previous post: Archbishop of Bordeaux (1769–81)

Orders
- Consecration: 8 April 1770 by Louis-René de Rohan

Personal details
- Born: 7 November 1738 Paris, France
- Died: 31 October 1813 (aged 74)
- Parents: Hercule Mériadec, Prince of Guéméné; Louise de Rohan

Ferdinand Maximilien Mériadec de Rohan (7 November 1738 – 31 October 1813) was a French Catholic Prelate who was Archbishop of Bordeaux and then Archbishop of Cambrai.

== Early life ==
He was the son of Hercule Meriadec de Rohan, prince de Guéméné and Louise-Gabrielle Julie de Rohan; brother of Cardinal de Rohan, and Jules, prince de Guéméné. Mériadec was a chaplain of the Empress Joséphine de Beauharnais. He served as prior and doctor of the Sorbonne and provost of the church of Strasbourg.

== Episcopate ==
He was nominated Archbishop of Bordeaux by King Louis XV on 26 December 1769, and his bulls were granted by Pope Clement XIV in the Consistory of 29 January 1770. He was consecrated a bishop in the church of the Sorbonne on 8 April 1770 by his brother Louis, the coadjutor Archbishop of Strasbourg, assisted by the Bishops of Poitiers and Vabres. He was installed in Bordeaux by procurator. He made his solemn entry into Bordeaux on 5 May 1771. He was nominated Archbishop of Cambrai by King Louis XVI on 28 January 1781, and received his bulls from Pope Pius VI dated 2 April 1781.

== Private life ==
His mistress was Charlotte Stuart, Duchess of Albany, illegitimate daughter of Prince Charles Edward Stuart, with whom he had at least three children, including Charles Edward Stuart, Count Roehenstart. Lacking legitimacy or permission, Charlotte was unable to marry. Thus, she otherwise sought a protector and provider. Probably unbeknownst to her father, Prince Charles Edward Stuart ("Bonnie Prince Charlie"), she became the mistress of Mériadec – related by blood to the house of Stuart as well as Bourbon and Lorraine – who was also unable to marry legitimately, having entered the Church as a younger son of a noble house. By him, she had the following issue: two daughters, Victoire Adélaïde (born between 1781 and spring 1783), and Charlotte (born during summer 1780), and finally a son, Charles Edward. Possibly, there were also two other girls, Marie Victoire (born June 1779), and Marie Aglaë, who is either identical with one of her sisters or has not been accounted for. Her children were kept secret, and remained largely unknown until the 20th century. When Charlotte eventually left France for Florence shortly after her son's birth, she entrusted the children into the care of her mother, Clementina Walkinshaw, and it appears that few, and certainly not her father, knew of their existence.

His sister-in-law, Marie Louise de La Tour d'Auvergne, was a first cousin of Prince Charles Edward Stuart and became his mistress. They had a short-lived son together, Charles Godefroi Sophie Jules Marie de Rohan, but Charles left her for Clementina Walkinshaw, with whom he had Charlotte.

He died in Paris in 1813.

== Ancestry ==
Ancestors of Ferdinand Maximilien Mériadec de Rohan

16. Louis VII, Prince of Guéméné
8. Charles II, Prince of Guéméné
17. Anne de Rohan
4. Charles de Rohan, Prince of Guéméné
18. Henri de Schomberg
9. Jeanne Armande de Schomberg
19. Anne de La Guiche
2. Hercule Mériadec de Rohan, Prince of Guéméné
20. André de Cochefilet, Seigneur of Vauceslas
10. Charles de Cochefilet, Count of Vauvineux
21. Élisabeth de L'Aubespine, Lady of Vauvineux
5. Charlotte Élisabeth de Cochefilet
22. Robert Aubéry, Marquis of Vatan
11. Françoise Angélique Aubéry
23. Claude de Prestreval
1. Ferdinand Maximilien Mériadec de Rohan
24. Hercule de Rohan, Duke of Montbazon
12. François de Rohan, Prince of Soubise
25. Marie de Bretagne d'Avaugour
6. Hercule Mériadec de Rohan, Duke of Rohan-Rohan
26. Henri Chabot, Duke of Rohan
13. Anne de Rohan-Chabot, Princess of Soubise
27. Marguerite de Rohan, Duchess of Rohan
3. Louise Gabrielle Julie de Rohan
28. Charles de Lévis, Duke of Ventadour
14. Louis Charles de Lévis, Duke of Ventadour
29. Marie de La Guiche
7. Anne Geneviève de Lévis
30. Philippe de La Mothe-Houdancourt, Duke of Cardona
15. Charlotte de La Motte Houdancourt
31. Louise de Prie

== Sources ==
- Bongie, Laurence (1986). The Love of a Prince – Bonnie Prince Charlie in France, 1744–1748. Vancouver: University of British Columbia Press. ISBN 978-0774802581.
- Fisquet, Honore (1864). La France pontificale (Gallia Christiana): Cambrai (in French). Paris: Étienne Repos. pp. 359–368.
