= Charles Alain, Prince of Guémené =

French Nobel

Charles Alain de Rohan
- Prince of Guéméné, Duke of Bouillon
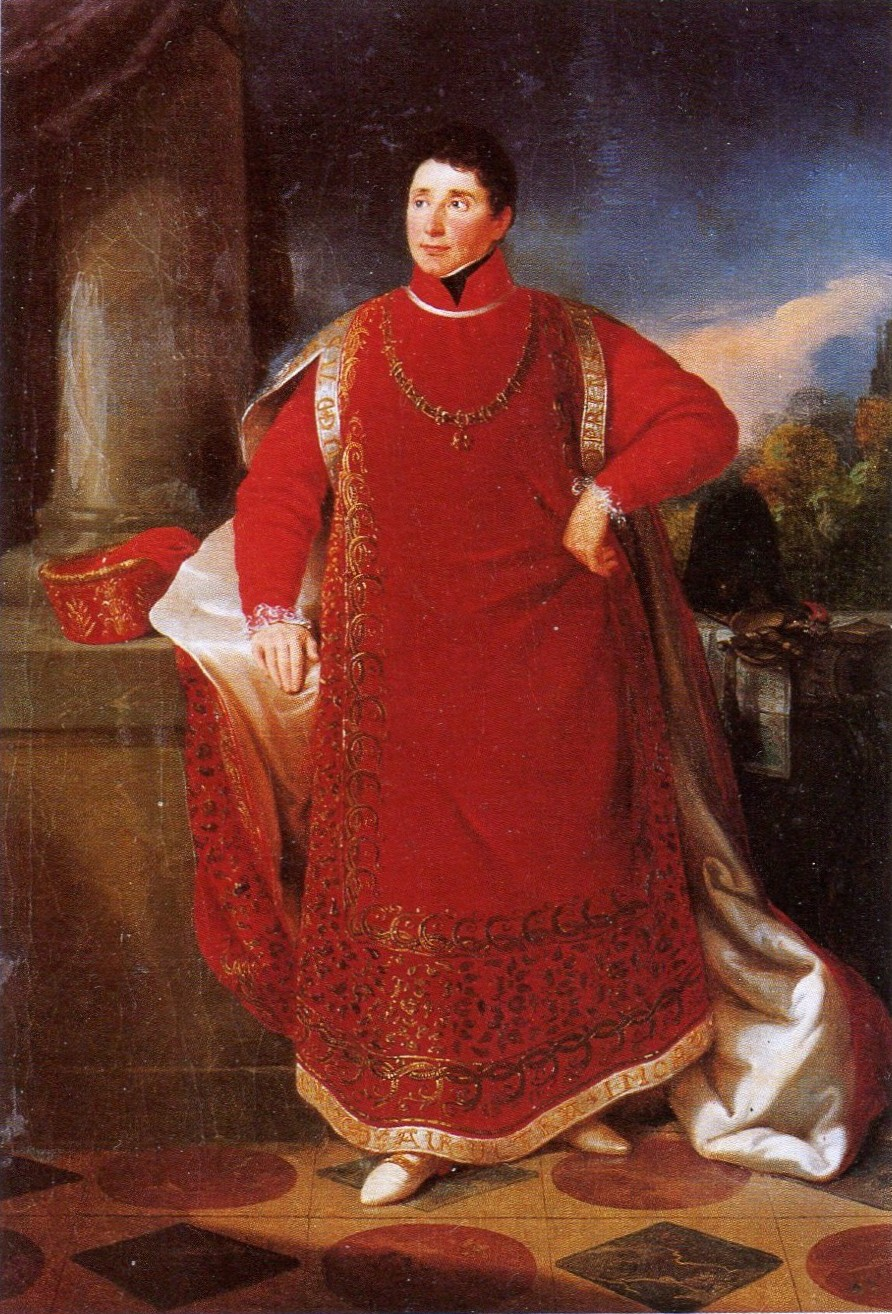
- Portrait by Alexander Clarot, 1841
- Full name: Charles Alain Gabriel de Rohan
- Born: 18 January 1764; Versailles, France
- Died: 24 April 1836 (aged 72); Sychrov Castle, Austrian Empire
- Noble family: Rohan
- Spouse: Louise Aglaé de Conflans d'Armentiere
- Issue Detail: Berthe, Duchess of Rohan
- Father: Henri Louis, Prince of Guéméné
- Mother: Victoire de Rohan

Charles Alain de Rohan (Charles Alain Gabriel; 18 January 1764 – 24 April 1836) was a French nobleman and Prince of Guéméné. He died without any surviving descendants as his daughter died without children.

== Biography ==
Born on 18 January 1764 at the Palace of Versailles, he was baptised the same day. He was the son of Henri Louis de Rohan and his distant cousin Victoire de Rohan. His mother was governess to the children of Marie Antoinette and Louis XVI; she was succeeded by Madame de Polignac. After his parents became disgraced with his fathers debts, the family moved from Versailles and had to sell their famous townhouse, the Parisian Hôtel de Rohan-Guémené.

He married Louise Aglaé de Conflans d'Armentieres at the Église Saint-Sulpice in Paris on 29 May 1781 and had one daughter, Berthe, who would later marry her uncle the Duke of Bouillon. Berthe would have no children and as such, Charles Alain has no known descendants.

His cousins included the Prince of Condé, son of Charlotte de Rohan, sister of Victoire; the Abbess of Remiremont was also his cousin.

He emigrated from France in 1791 and resided in Austria where he joined the army and was promoted to Field Marshal. He entered the service of Leopold II, Holy Roman Emperor.

At the death of his distant cousin Jacques Léopold de La Tour d'Auvergne the Duke of Bouillon in 1802, Charles Alain was the nearest relative in the family since his grandmother Marie Louise de La Tour d'Auvergne was Jacques Léopold's aunt.

He purchased the Sychrov Castle in Bohemia (today in the Czech Republic) where he died in 1836. The castle was the home of the Rohan family until 1945.

== Issue ==
- Berthe de Rohan (4 May 1782 – 22 February 1841) married her uncle Louis Victor Meriadec de Rohan-Guéméné and had no issue.

== Ancestry ==
Ancestors of Charles Alain, Prince of Guémené

8. Hercule Mériadec, Prince of Guéméné
4. Jules, Prince of Guéméné
9. Louise de Rohan
2. Henri Louis, Prince of Guéméné
10. Charles Godefroy de La Tour d'Auvergne
5. Marie Louise de La Tour d'Auvergne
11. Maria Karolina Sobieska
1. Charles Alain Gabriel de Rohan
12. Jules, Prince of Soubise
6. Charles, Prince of Soubise
13. Anne Julie de Melun
3. Victoire de Rohan
14. Victor Amadeus, Prince of Carignan
7. Anne Therese of Savoy
15. Marie Victoire de Savoie, Légitimée de Savoie
