= Henri Louis, Prince of Guéméné =

Prince of Guéméné

Henri Louis de Rohan
- Prince of Guéméné
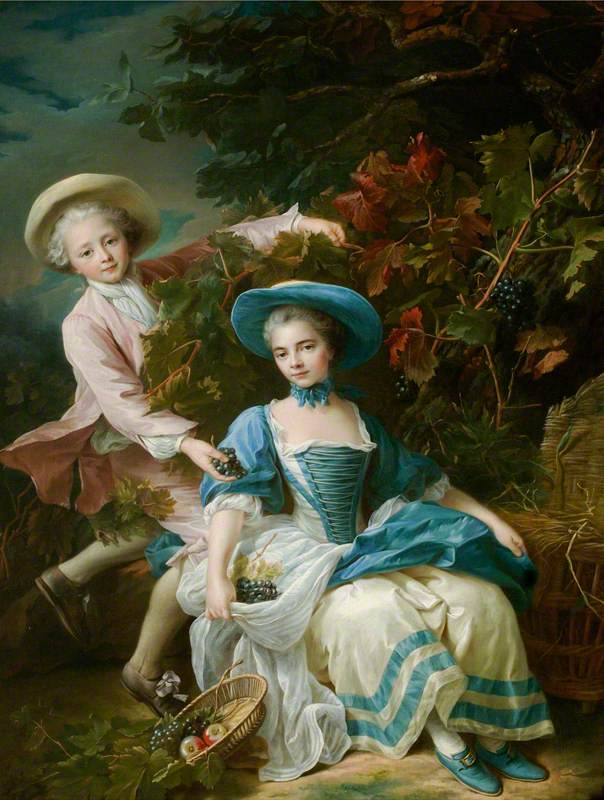
- The Prince de Guémenée and Victoire de Rohan, dressed as grape harvesters, in 1757, by François-Hubert Drouais.
- Full name: Henri Louis Marie de Rohan
- Born: 30 August 1745; Paris, France
- Died: 24 April 1809 (aged 63); Prague, Bohemia, Holy Roman Empire
- Noble family: Rohan
- Spouse: Victoire de Rohan
- Issue Detail: Charles Alain, Prince of Guéméné; Marie Louise Joséphine Princess of Rochefort; Louis Victor, Duke of Bouillon
- Father: Jules, Prince of Guéméné
- Mother: Marie Louise de La Tour d'Auvergne

Henri Louis de Rohan, Prince of Guéméné (Henri Louis Marie; 30 August 1745 – 24 April 1809), was a French courtier and the penultimate Grand Chamberlain of France.

== Biography ==
Henri Louis was born in Paris, a member of the House of Rohan, which claimed ancestry relating to the Dukes of Brittany. He was the only son of the family's main branch chief, Jules Hercule Mériadec de Rohan, Prince of Guéméné, whereas his mother Marie Louise Henriette Jeanne de La Tour d'Auvergne (daughter of Charles Godefroy de La Tour d'Auvergne) had an illegitimate child with her lover, Charles Edward Stuart.

On 15 January 1761, he married his second cousin, Victoire Armande Josèphe de Rohan, daughter of Charles de Rohan, Prince de Soubise and Princess Anna Theresa of Savoy. The couple had five children, four of whom survived into adult age. The family owned the Hôtel de Rohan-Guémené on the Place des Vosges.

In 1775 Henri Louis was appointed Grand Chamberlain of France by Louis XVI, inasmuch as his uncle Godefroy Charles Henri de La Tour d'Auvergne, duke of Bouillon gave up that charge. The Princess of Guéméné also inherited a charge; she was appointed Governess of the Children of France.

From the 1780s on Henri Louis and his family was involved in personal and political scandals. In 1782, Henri Louis's mistress, Countess Thérèse-Lucy de Dillon, the first wife of Arthur Dillon and a friend of his wife, succumbed to tuberculosis at age 30; in the same year the Prince declared bankruptcy, with a debt of 33 million livres. He and Victoire abdicated their charges at the court and left Versailles. Their properties were sold, including the Hôtel de Rohan-Guéméné and their mansion at Montreuil.

At the death of his father-in-law, he was the legal heir to the title Prince of Soubise.

During the French Revolution, Henri Louis and his father, wife and children fled to Habsburg monarchy, where he died in Prague in 1809, at the age 63 years (later in 1820 his family bought Sychrov Castle, where they established residence).

== Issue ==
- Charlotte Victoire Joséphe Henriette de Rohan (17 November 1761 - 15 December 1771), died aged ten
- Charles Alain Gabriel de Rohan, Duke of Montbazon, Rohan and Guéméné; Prince of Guéméné (Versailles, 18 January 1764 - Paris, 24 April 1836); married in 1781:
  - Louise Aglae de Conflans d'Armentieres (1763–1819); had issue.
- Marie Louise Joséphine de Rohan (13 April 1765 - Paris, 21 September 1839); married in 1780:
  - A cousin Charles Louis Gaspard de Rohan, Duke of Montbazon (1765–1843) and had issue.
- Louis Victor Meriadec de Rohan, Duke of Rohan and Bouillon (Paris, 20 July 1766 - Czech Republic, 10 December 1846) married in 1800:
  - A niece Berthe de Rohan (1782–1841); had no issue.
- Jules Armand Louis de Rohan (Versailles, 20 October 1768 - Czech republic, 13 January 1836); married in 1800:
  - Princess Wilhelmine Catherine Frédérique Biron von Kurland, Duchess of Sagan (1781–1839); had no issue.

== Ancestry ==
Ancestors of Henri Louis, Prince of Guéméné

16. Charles II de Rohan, Prince de Guéméné
8. Charles III de Rohan, Prince de Guéméné
17. Jeanne Armande de Schomberg
4. Hercule Mériadec de Rohan, Prince de Guéméné
18. Charles de Cochefilet, Count of Vauvineux
9. Charlotte Elizabeth de Cochefilet
19. -
2. Jules Hercule Mériadec de Rohan, Prince of Guéméné
20. François de Rohan, Prince de Soubise
10. Hercule Mériadec de Rohan, Prince of Soubise
21. Anne Julie de Rohan, Princess de Soubise
5. Louise Gabrielle Julie de Rohan-Soubise
22. Louis Charles de Lévis, Duke of Ventadour
11. Anne Geneviève de Lévis
23. Charlotte Éleonore de La Mothe-Houdancourt
1. Henri Louis Marie de Rohan
24. Godefroy Maurice de La Tour d'Auvergne, Duke of Bouillon
12. Emmanuel Theodose de La Tour d'Auvergne, Duke of Bouillon
25. Marie Anne Mancini
6. Charles Godefroy de La Tour d'Auvergne, Duke of Bouillon
26. Charles Belgique Hollande de La Trémoille, Duke of Thouars
13. Marie Armande Victoire de La Trémoille
27. Madeleine de Qréquy
3. Marie Louise Henriette Jeanne de La Tour d'Auvergne
28. Jan III Sobieski king of Poland
14. Jakub Ludwik Sobieski
29. Marie Casimire Louise de la Grange d'Arquien
7. Maria Karolina Sobieska
30. Philipp Wilhelm von Neuburg, Elector Palatine
15. Hedwig Elisabeth of Neuburg
31. Elisabeth Amalie von Hesse-Darmstadt
