= Charlotte Louise de Rohan-Guéméné =

Princess of Masserano (1722–1786)

- Mademoiselle de Rohan
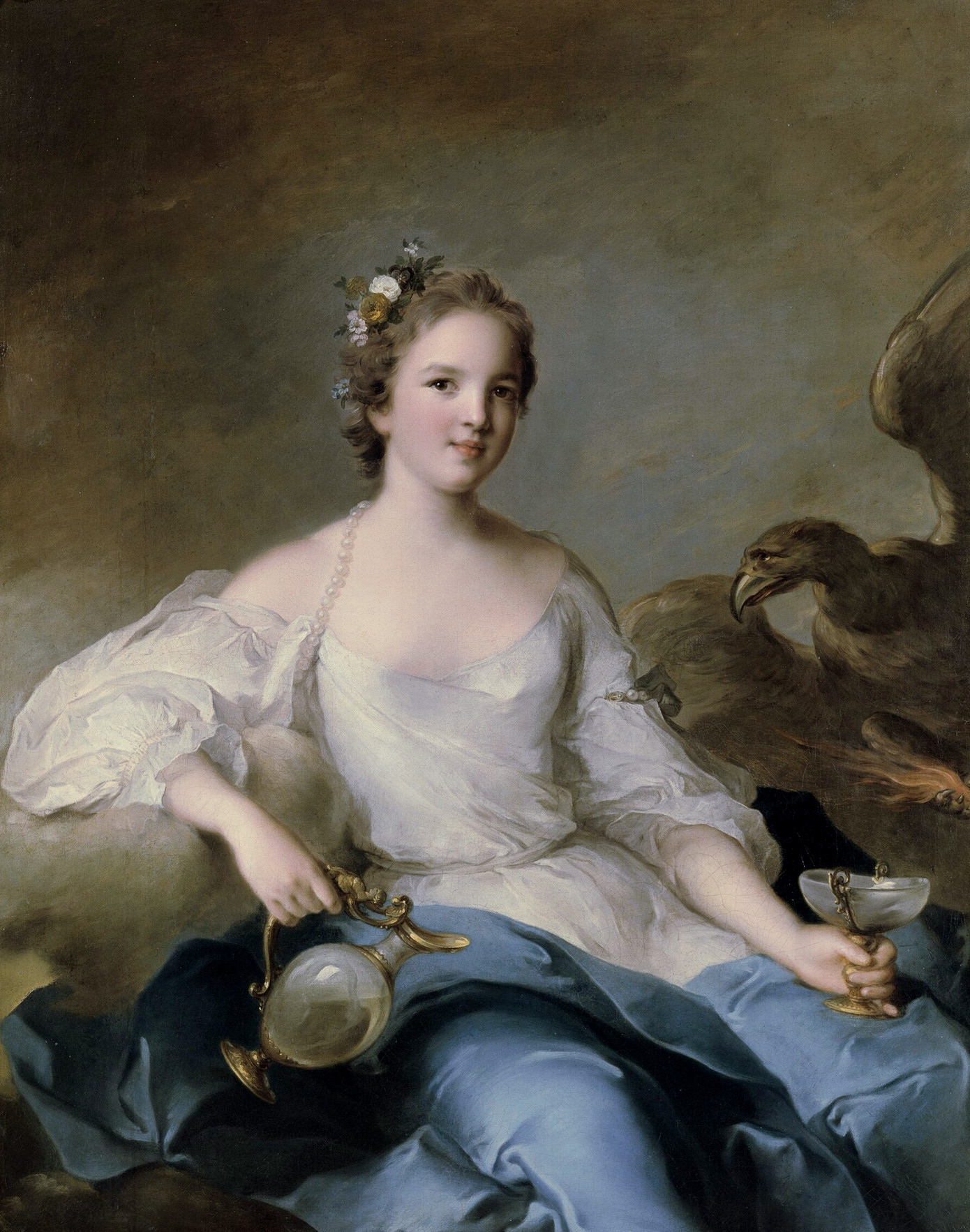
- Portrait by Jean-Marc Nattier, c. 1738
- Born: 12 February 1722; Paris, France
- Died: 3 October 1786 (aged 64); Madrid, Spain
- Noble family: Rohan
- Spouse: Victor Philip Ferrero Fieschi, Prince of Masserano (m. 1737; died 1777)
- Issue: Carlo Sebastiano Ferrero-Fieschi, 7th Prince of Masserano
- Father: Hercule Mériadec, Prince of Guéméné
- Mother: Louise de Rohan

Charlotte Louise de Rohan-Guéméné (12 February 1722 – 3 October 1786) was a French noblewoman who belonged to the House of Rohan. By marriage to Victor Philip Ferrero Fieschi, she was titled Princess of Masserano and Marquis of Crevacuore.

== Early life ==
Charlotte Louise de Rohan-Guéméné was born in the city of Paris, France on 12 February 1722. She was the eldest and first-born daughter of Hercule Mériadec, Prince of Guéméné, and his wife; Louise de Rohan.

=== Marriage ===
On 24 October 1737, her mother, Louise presented Charlotte to Louis XV and his Queen; Marie Leszczyńska at the Palace of Fontainebleau. In the span of two days, Charlotte was sent to be wed to the Italian Prince of Masserano; Victor Philip Ferrero Fieschi. The union resulted in the birth of 3 children, one of which survived.

=== Issue ===
- Still-born daughter
- Still-born son
- Carlo Sebastiano Ferrero-Fieschi, 7th Prince of Masserano (19 January 1760 – 7 August 1826)

=== Death ===
Upon the news that her husband had been pronounced dead, Charlotte was deemed as a widow, and stripped of her title as Princess of Masserano. On 3 October 1786, Charlotte died in Madrid, Spain.

== Titles, honors, coat of arms ==
- 12 February 1722 – 24 October 1737 Mademoiselle de Rohan
- 24 October 1737 – 26 October 1777 Princess of Masserano and Marquis of Crevacuore
- 26 October 1777 – 3 October 1787 Dowager Princess of Masserano and Marquis of Crevacuore
