= Duchy of Montbazon =

Area around Montbazon, near Tours, France

The Duchy of Montbazon is the area around Montbazon, near Tours, in France. During the Ancien Régime, Montbazon became a seigneurie held by the House of Rohan in the fifteenth century; was elevated to a comté in 1557, and raised to the level of a duchy in 1588.

== List of lords of Guéméné, ca. 1430—1557 ==
From	To	Lord of Guéméné
	1438	Charles I de Rohan (d. 1438)
1438	1457	Louis I de Rohan (d. 1457)
1457	14??	Louis II de Rohan (d. 1508)
14??	1498	Louis III de Rohan (d. 1498)
1498	1527	Louis IV de Rohan (d. 1527)
1527	1557	Louis V de Rohan (d. 1557)

== List of counts of Montbazon, 1557—1611 ==
From	To	Count of Montbazon
1557	1611	Louis VI de Rohan (1540–1611)

== List of dukes of Montbazon, 1588—present ==
From	To	Duke of Montbazon
1588	1589	Louis VII de Rohan (1562–1589)
1589	1654	Hercule, Duke of Montbazon (1568–1654)
1654	1667	Louis VIII de Rohan (1598–1667)
1667	1699	Charles II de Rohan (1633–1699)
1699	1727	Charles III, Prince of Guéméné (1655–1727)
1727	1757	Hercule Mériadec, Prince of Guéméné (1688–1757)
1757	1800	Jules, Prince of Guéméné (1726–1800)
1800	1809	Henri Louis, Prince of Guéméné (1745–1809)
1809	1836	Charles Alain, Prince of Guéméné (1764–1836)
1836	1846	Louis IX Victor Meriadec de Rohan (1766–1846)
1846	1892	Camille Philippe Joseph Idesbald de Rohan-Rochefort (1800–1892)
1892	1914	Alain I Benjamin Arthur de Rohan-Rochefort (1853–1914)
1914	1976	Alain II Anton Joseph de Rohan-Rochefort (1893–1976)
1976	2008	Charles V Alain Albert de Rohan-Rochefort (1934–2008)
2008	2019	Albert Marie de Rohan-Rochefort (1936–2019)
2019		Charles VI Raoul de Rohan (1954-)
