= Hercule Mériadec de Rohan =

Hercule Mériadec de Rohan may refer to:

- Hercule Mériadec, Duke of Rohan-Rohan (1669–1749), son of François, Prince of Soubise and Anne de Rohan-Chabot
- Hercule Mériadec, Prince of Guéméné (1688–1757), son of Charles III, Prince of Guéméné and Charlotte Élisabeth de Cochefilet
