= Jules de Rohan =

Jules de Rohan is the name of:

- Jules, Prince of Soubise (1697–1724), son of Hercule Mériadec, Duke of Rohan-Rohan and Anne Geneviève de Lévis
- Jules, Prince of Guéméné (1726–1800), son of Hercule Mériadec, Prince of Guéméné and Louise de Rohan
