= Prince of Guémené =

Prince of Guémené is a title of French nobility associated with the fiefdom of Guémené-sur-Scorff in Brittany and held within the House of Rohan. The fiefdom was bought on 26 May 1377, for 3,400 sous d'or by Jean de Rohan, Viscount of Rohan. From his second marriage to Jeanne de Navarre (daughter of Philip III of Navarre) the couple had two children; the eldest Alain became the Viscount of Rohan. That branch became extinct in 1527. The younger child, Charles, was given the fiefdom of Guémené.

Charles was the founder of the Guémené line of the House of Rohan. From this line, stem the Princes of Soubise (founded by François de Rohan) and the Princes of Rochefort (descended from Charles, Prince of Rochefort, son of Charles de Rohan).

The present male line descendants live in Austria, and the family fled France due to the French Revolution.

== Lords of Guémené ==
- Jean de Rohan
- Charles de Rohan (1375–1438)
- Louis Ier (d. 1457)
- Louis II (d. 1508)
- Louis III (d. 1498)
- Louis IV(d. 1527)
- Louis V (1513–1557)
- Louis VI (1540–1611)

== Princes of Guémené ==
- Louis VI (1540–1611)

married Éléonore de Rohan;
After the creation of the Lordship of Montbazon to a Duchy-Peerage, the principality of Guémené was traditionally given to the heir of the Duke. However, most Dukes went by their princely title in later years

- Louis VII (1562–1589), son of the above (1st Duke of Montbazon)
- Hercule (1568–1654), brother of the above; married Madeleine de Lenoncourt;
- Louis VIII de Rohan (1598-1667), son of the above; married his cousin Anne de Rohan-Guéméné;
- Charles II (1633–1699) son of the above; married Jeanne Armande de Schomberg, daughter of Henri de Schomberg;
- Charles III de Rohan (1655–1727) son of the above; married firstly to Marie Anne d'Albert, then Charlotte Elizabeth de Cochefilet;
- François Armand (1682–1717) son of the above;

married Louise Julie de La Tour d'Auvergne, daughter of Godefroy Maurice de La Tour d'Auvergne and Marie Anne Mancini;

- Hercule Mériadec (1688–1757) brother of the above; married Louise Gabrielle Julie de Rohan, daughter of Hercule Mériadec, Duke of Rohan-Rohan and Anne Geneviève de Lévis;
- Jules (1726–1800) son of the above; married Marie Louise de La Tour d'Auvergne, daughter of Charles Godefroy de La Tour d'Auvergne and Maria Karolina Sobieska;
- Henri Louis (1745-1809) married Victoire de Rohan, daughter of Charles de Rohan, Prince of Soubise and Princess Anne Therese of Savoy;
- Charles Alain Gabriel (1764–1836) son of the above;
- Louis Victor Meriadec (1766–1846) brother of the above;
- Camille Philippe Joseph (1800–1892) nephew of the above;
- Alain Benjamin Arthur (1853–1914) great nephew of the above;
- Alain Anton Joseph (1893–1976) son of the above;
- Karl Alain Albert (1934–2008) nephew of the above.
- Albert Maria (1936–2019) brother of the above.
- Charles Raoul (1954-) 3rd cousin-once-removed of the above

== Dukes of Bouillon ==
The present Prince of Guémené is also a claimant to the Duchy of Bouillon. In 1816, at the Congress of Vienna, it was decided that the family were the rightful heirs to the duchy which had been the property of the House of La Tour d'Auvergne. Through the marriage of Jules and Marie Louise de La Tour d'Auvergne in 1743, the Princes of Guémené were descendants of the La Tour d'Auvergne family through Marie Louise, whose nephew Jacques de La Tour d'Auvergne (son of her brother the Duke of Bouillon and Mademoiselle de Marsan) was the last Duke of Bouillon.
