= Louis VIII de Rohan =

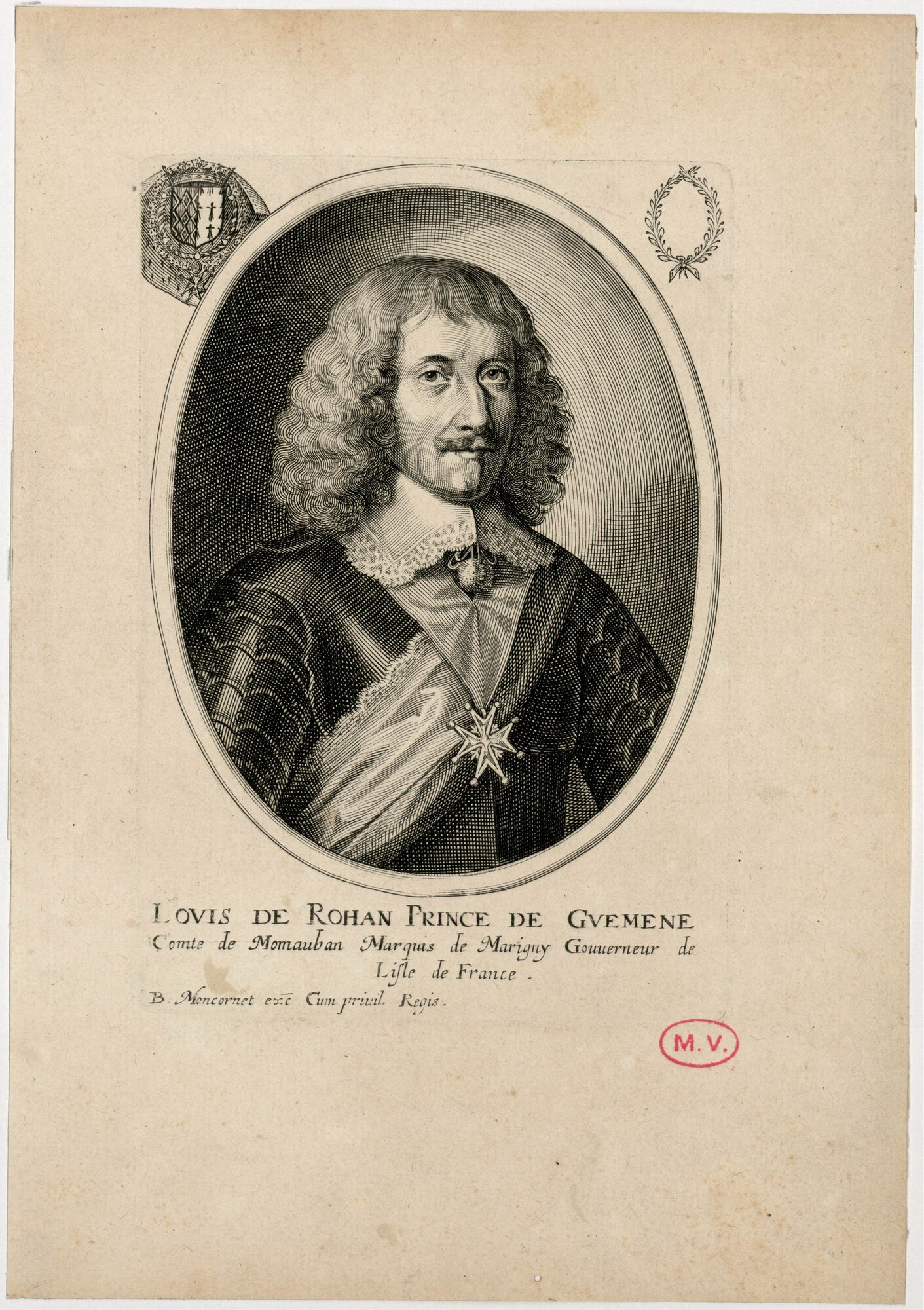
Engraving of Louis VIII de Rohan by Balthasar Moncornet.

Louis VIII de Rohan (August 5, 1598 – Paris, February 18, 1667) was a French aristocrat from the House of Rohan. He was the 3rd Duke of Montbazon, 4th Prince of Guéméné, Baron de Coupvray et du Verger, Comte de Rochefort, Seigneur de Mortiercrolles, etc., and a Pair of France.

== Biography ==
Louis VIII de Rohan was the eldest son of Hercule de Rohan, Duc de Montbazon, and Madeleine de Lenoncourt. On December 31, 1619, he was admitted to the Order of the Holy Spirit as Comte de Rochefort. In 1621, he became governor of Île-de-France, Soissons, Noyon, etc., in survivance of his father. Due to his marriage, he was able to assume the name Prince of Guéméné in 1622.

In 1636, he participated in the campaign in Picardy and, on May 24, 1654, in the coronation of Louis XIV. Upon his father's death on October 16, 1654, he became the 3rd Duke of Montbazon and subsequently Grand Huntsman of France.

=== Marriage and children ===
Louis VIII de Rohan married on February 2, 1619 his cousin Anne de Rohan, 4th Princesse de Guémené in 1622 (died March 14, 1685), heir of Pierre de Rohan, 3rd Prince de Guéméné (died 1622), and Madeleine de Rieux-Châteauneuf.

They had 2 children:

- Charles II de Rohan (died July 3, 1699), 1667 4th Duc de Montbazon, 5th Prince de Guémené, Comte de Montauban, Pair de France; Married in 1653, Jeanne Armande de Schomberg (1633-1706), daughter of Henri de Schomberg, Marshal of France. Had issue.
- Louis de Rohan 1635 - beheaded November 27, 1674 in the Bastille), called the Chevalier de Rohan, Grand Huntsman of France. Executed for a crime lèse-majesté, having taken part in the Conspiracy of Latréaumont.

Louis VIII de Rohan died in February 1667 and was buried in the Trinitarian Church he founded in Coupvray. Anne de Rohan died on March 14, 1685 and was buried in the Church of the Congregation of the Feuillants in Paris.

== Sources ==
- Christophe Levantal, Ducs et pairs et duchés-pairies laïques à l'époque moderne (1519-1790), Paris, Maisoneuve et Larose, 1996, p. 765
- Detlev Schwennicke, Europäische Stammtafeln, Band 10, 1986, Tafel 17.
- François-Alexandre Aubert de La Chenaye-Desbois, Dictionnaire de la noblesse, 3rd edition, Volume 17, 1872, pp 508.
- Louis Moréri, Le grand dictionnaire historique, Volume 9, 1759, p. 304
