= Hercule Mériadec, Prince of Guéméné =

Hercule Mériadec
- Duc de Montbazon, Prince de Guéméné
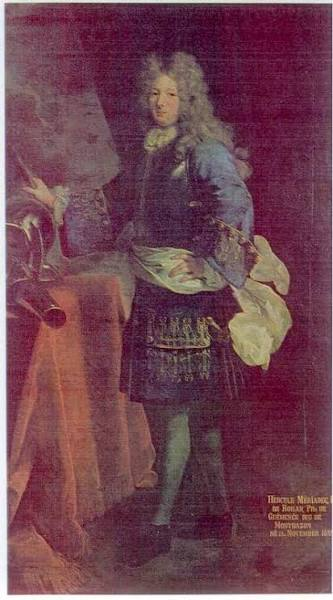
- Hercule Mériadec, Prince of Guéméné (1688 – 1757)
- Born: 13 November 1688
- Died: 21 December 1757 (aged 69); Sainte Maure, France
- Spouse: Louise-Gabrielle de Rohan-Soubise
- Issue Detail: Charlotte Louise, Princess of Masserano; Généviève, Abbess of Marquette; Jules, Duc de Montbazon; Louis Armand, Prince de Montauban; Louis René, Cardinal de Rohan; Ferdinand, Archbishop of Cambrai
Names
- Hercule Mériadec de Rohan
- House: Rohan
- Father: Charles de Rohan, 5th Duc de Montbazon
- Mother: Charlotte Élisabeth de Cochefilet

Hercule Mériadec de Rohan (13 November 1688 – 21 December 1757) was a prince étranger and the sixth Duke of Montbazon in France, "Prince de Guéméne" being the title he bore prior to inheriting the dukedom.

== Lineage ==
Born to Charles de Rohan and his wife, Charlotte Élisabeth de Cochefilet, he was the couple’s third child and second son. Until the death of his paternal grandfather, Charles, 4th Duc de Montbazon in 1699, he was fifth in line of succession to the dukedom and not expected to inherit it: Ahead of him were his father Charles, then styled Prince de Guéméné (1655-1727), his eldest brother François-Armand, Prince de Montbazon (1682-1717), François-Armand's son Charles-Jules de Rohan (1700-1703) and another older brother, Louis-Charles-Casimir, Comte de Rochefort (1686-1749). After Charles-Jules died as a child, Louis-Charles-Casimir forfeited his claim to a secular inheritance by joining the Order of the Holy Cross, whereupon Hercule Mériadec became Comte de Rochefort. His father was the fifth Duc de Montbazon, but succession to that title remained uncertain until François-Armand died without living children at the age of 35 in 1717, leaving Hercule-Mériadec to become Prince de Guéméné, the title usually borne by the heir apparent.

== Biography ==
Only when his father died in October 1727 did he succeed to the Montbazon ducal peerage and become head of the House of Rohan, which enjoyed the high rank of princes étrangers at the court of Louis XVI.

While serving in the Gendarmes de la Garde, he held the position of standard-bearer of the company.

Hercule Mériadec's siblings included Louis Constantin de Rohan, Bishop of Strasbourg, and Armand Jules de Rohan-Guéméné, Archbishop of Rheims, who crowned Louis XV king.

He married his second cousin, Louise Gabrielle Julie de Rohan-Soubise (1704–1780), youngest daughter of Hercule Mériadec, Duc de Rohan-Rohan and Prince de Soubise (1669-1749), head of the younger (Soubise) branch of the House of Rohan. Her mother was Anne Geneviève de Lévis, daughter of Louis Charles de Lévis, Duc de Ventadour.

His wife presented their daughter, Charlotte Louise, to Louis XV and the queen, Marie Leszczyńska, during the Honneurs de la Cour on 26 October 1737 at Fontainebleau, two days before her marriage.

Hercule-Mériadec died at Sainte-Maure aged sixty nine and was succeeded by his son, Jules. His two youngest sons were cardinals and only one of his daughters had issue (Charlotte Louise). His descendants in male line are settled in Austria.

== Issue ==
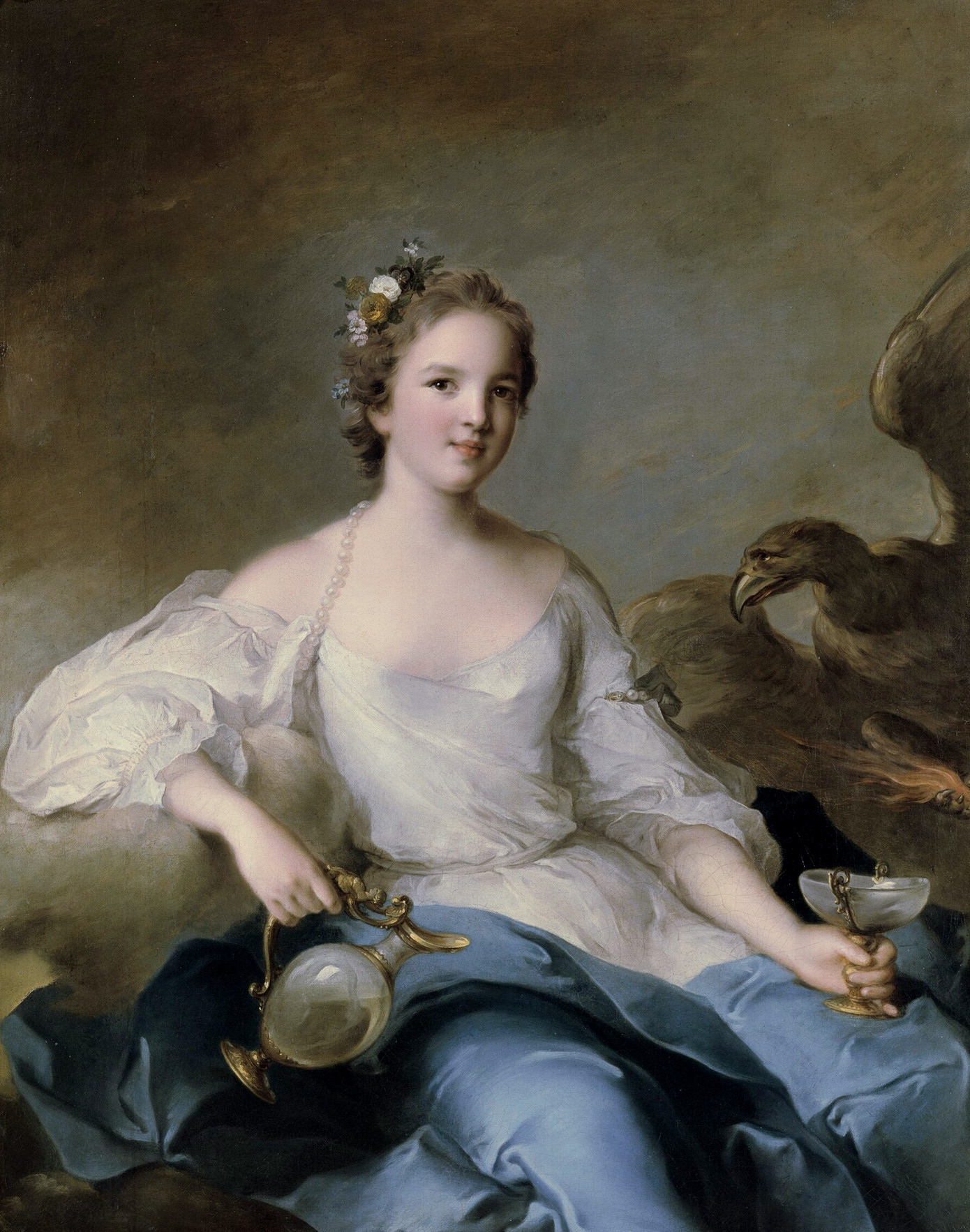
Hercule-Mériadec's eldest daughter, Charlotte Louise by Nattier, 1738

- Charlotte de Rohan, Mademoiselle de Rohan, later Mademoiselle de Guéméné (12 March 1722 – October 1786) married Victor Philip Ferrero Fieschi, Prince of Masserano and Spanish ambassador in London, and had issue;
- Généviève de Rohan, Abbess of Marquette (18 November 1724 – 1766) never married;
- Jules de Rohan, Duc de Montbazon (25 March 1726 – 10 December 1800) married Marie Louise de La Tour d'Auvergne, daughter of Charles Godefroy, sovereign Duke of Bouillon; and had issue;
- Marie Louise de Rohan (1728 – 31 May 1737);
- Louis Armand de Rohan, Prince de Montbazon (18 April 1731 – 24 July 1794), guillotined; married Gabrielle Rosalie Le Tonnelier de Breteuil, no issue
- Louis, Cardinal de Rohan (25 September 1734 – 16 February 1803) Prince-Bishop of Strasbourg, no issue;
- Ferdinand de Rohan, Archbishop of Cambrai (7 November 1738 – 30 October 1813), had illegitimate children with Charlotte Stuart, Duchess of Albany, illegitimate daughter of the English pretender, Charles Edward Stuart and Clementina Walkinshaw;
