= Louise de Rohan =

Louise
- Princess of Guéméné
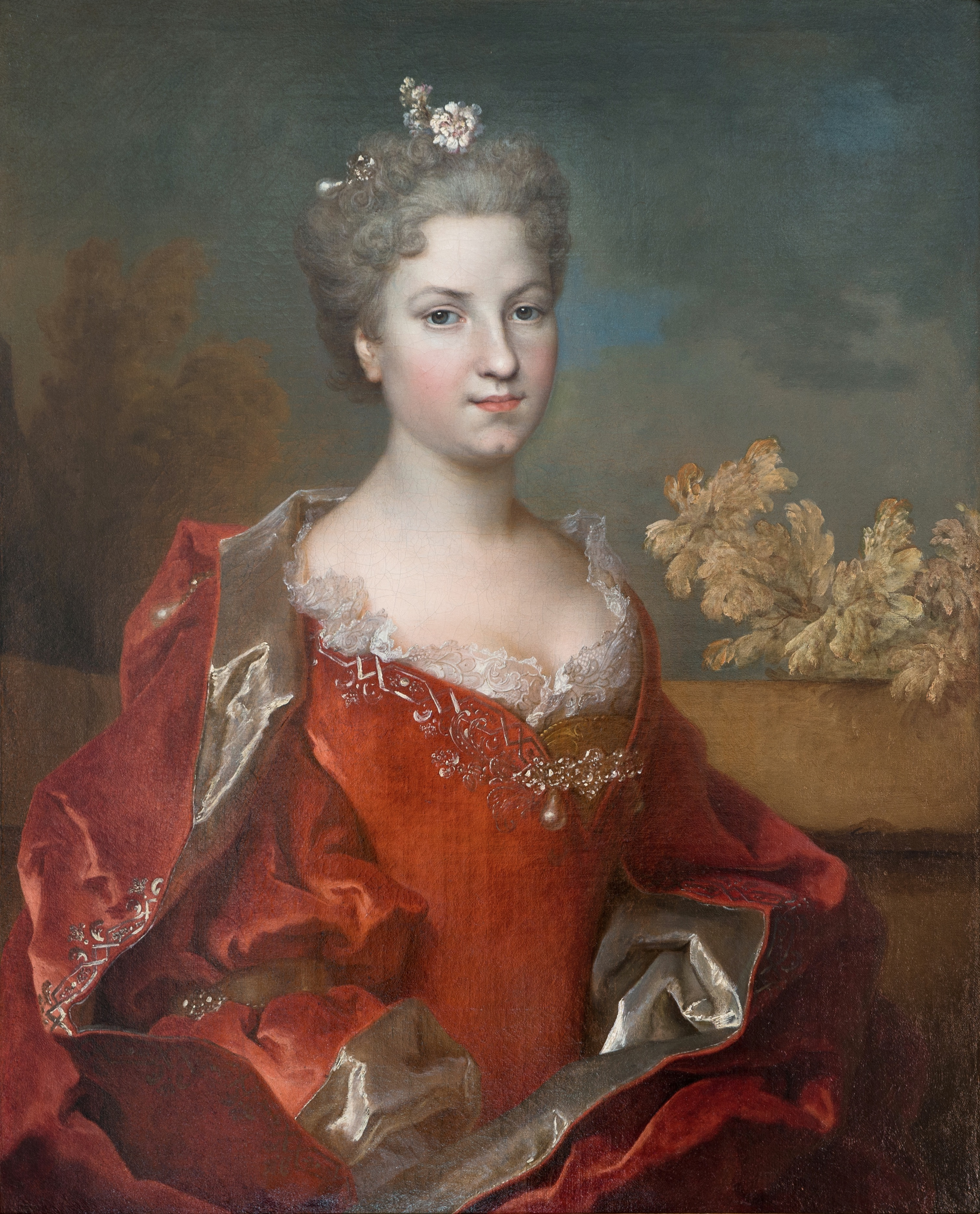
- Born: 11 August 1704; Hôtel de Soubise, Paris, France
- Died: 20 August 1780 (aged 76); Chevilly, Loiret, France
- Spouse: Hercule Mériadec de Rohan
- Issue Detail: Charlotte Louise, Princess of Masserano; Généviève, Abbess of Marquette; Jules, Prince of Guéméné; Louis Armand, Prince of Montbazon; Louis René Édouard, Cardinal de Rohan; Ferdinand, Archbishop of Cambrai
Names
- Louise Gabrielle Julie de Rohan
- House: Rohan
- Father: Hercule Mériadec de Rohan
- Mother: Anne Geneviève de Lévis

Louise de Rohan (Louise Gabrielle Julie; 11 August 1704 – 20 August 1780) was a French noblewoman and Princess of Guéméné by marriage.

== Biography ==
Born in Paris to Hercule Mériadec de Rohan and his wife Anne Geneviève de Lévis, as a member of the House of Rohan, she was entitled to the rank of Princesse étranger with the style of Highness. Her mother was the only child of Madame de Ventadour.

Her siblings included Louise Françoise, Duchess of La Meilleraye (married a grandson of Hortense Mancini and present ancestress of the Prince of Monaco) Jules, Prince of Soubise, Marie Isabelle, Duchess of Tallard, Governess of the Children of France. Her uncle was the Bishop of Strasbourg.

She was baptised with the names Louise Gabrielle Julie on 13 August. She was known as Louise de Rohan. Her uncle was the Bishop of Strasbourg, alleged son of Louis XIV.

Louise de Rohan was engaged to her cousin Hercule Mériadec de Rohan, who was the son and heir of Charles III, Prince of Guéméné and Charlotte Élisabeth de Cochefilet. They were married on 4 August 1718 at Jouarre Abbey where her older sister Charlotte Armande was Abbess.

Louise presented her daughter, Charlotte Louise, to Louis XV and the queen, Marie Leszczyńska on 26 October 1737 at Fontainebleau. Two days later Charlotte Louise married the Italian Prince of Masserano. The Prince of Masserano was the Spanish ambassador in London.

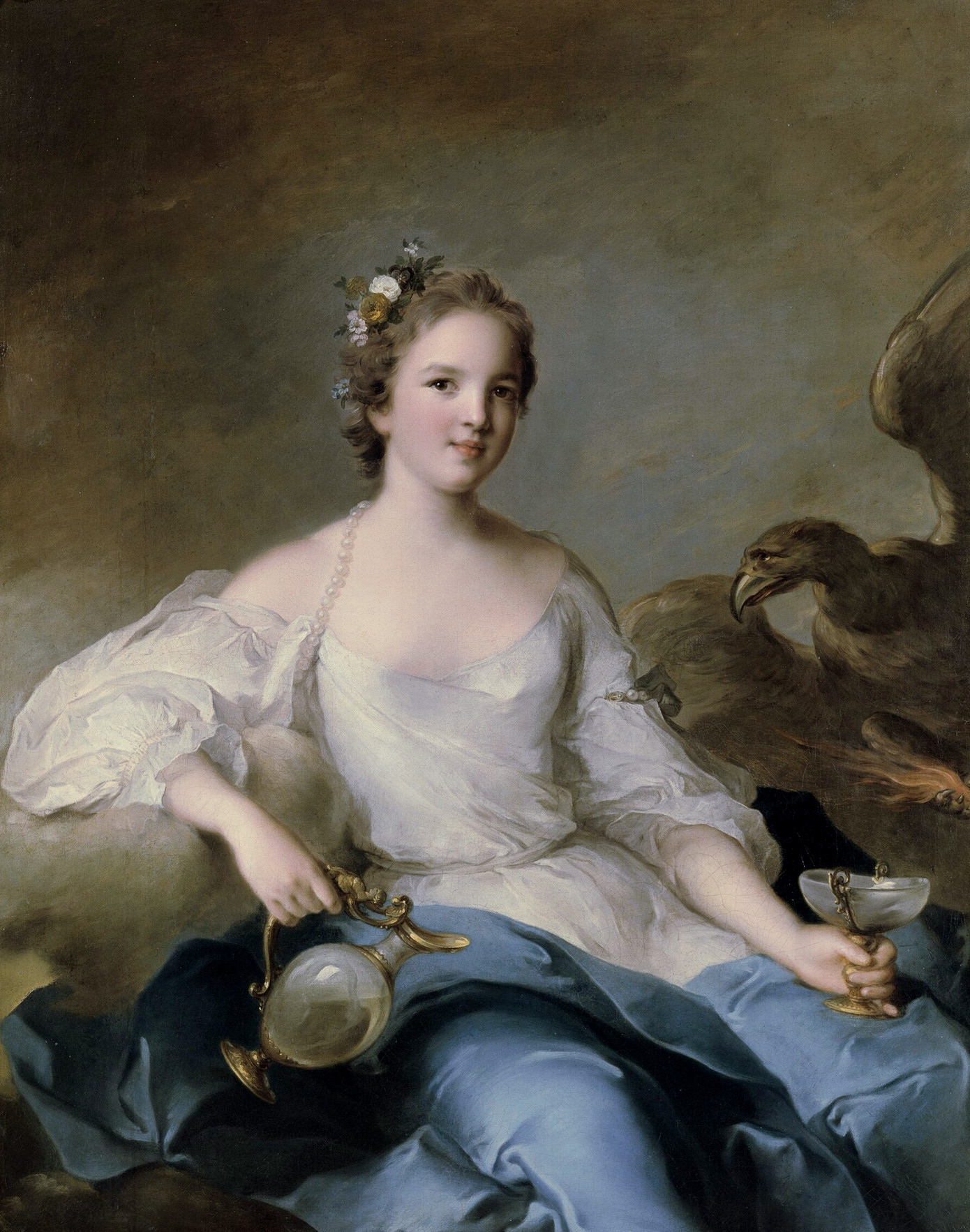
Louise's eldest daughter, Charlotte Louise by Nattier, 1738

She died at Chevilly, Loiret on 20 August 1780.

She owned the Manoir de Launay which she bought in 1747.

== Issue ==
- Charlotte Louise de Rohan (12 March 1722 – October 1786) - married Vittorio Filippo Ferrero-Fieschi (of the Fieschi family), Prince of Masserano, Spanish ambassador, and had issue;
- Geneviève Armande Élisabeth de Rohan, Abbess of Marquette (18 November 1724 – 1766) - never married;
- Jules Hercule Mériadec de Rohan, Prince of Guéméné (25 March 1726 – 10 December 1788) - married Marie Louise de La Tour d'Auvergne (daughter of Charles Godefroy de La Tour d'Auvergne and Maria Karolina Sobieska) and had issue;
- Marie-Louise de Rohan (1728 – 31 May 1737) - died in infancy;
- Louis Armand Constantin de Rohan, Prince de Montbazon (18 April 1731 – 24 July 1794) - married Gabrielle Rosalie Le Tonnelier de Breteuil, daughter of François Victor Le Tonnelier de Breteuil; no issue. Louis Armand was guillotined in the revolution;
- Louis René Édouard de Rohan, Cardinal de Rohan (25 September 1734 – 16 February 1803) - Archbishop of Strasbourg; no issue;
- Ferdinand Maximilien Mériadec de Rohan, Archbishop of Cambrai (7 November 1738 – 30 October 1813) - had illegitimate children with Charlotte Stuart, Duchess of Albany, daughter of Charles Edward Stuart and Clementina Walkinshaw

== Ancestry ==
Ancestors of Louise de Rohan

8. Hercule de Rohan, Duke of Montbazon
4. François de Rohan, Prince of Soubise
9. Marie de Bretagne d'Avaugour
2. Hercule Mériadec de Rohan, Duke of Rohan-Rohan
10. Henri Chabot, Duke of Rohan
5. Anne de Rohan-Chabot, Princess of Soubise
11. Marguerite de Rohan
1. Louise de Rohan
12. Charles de Lévis, Duke of Ventadour
6. Louis Charles de Lévis, Duke of Ventadour
13. Marie de La Guiche
3. Anne Geneviève de Lévis
14. Philippe de La Mothe Houdancourt, Duke of Cardona
7. Charlotte de La Motte Houdancourt
15. Louise de Prie
