= Charles III, Prince of Guéméné =

Charles
- Prince of Guéméné
- Born: 30 September 1655
- Died: 10 October 1727 (aged 72)
- Spouse: Charlotte Élisabeth de Cochefilet; Marie Anne d'Albert
- Issue Detail: François Armand, Prince of Montbazon; Hercule Mériadec, Prince of Guéméné; Charles, Prince of Rochefort; Armand Jules, Archbishop of Reims; Louis Constantin, Archbishop of Strasbourg
Names
- Charles de Rohan
- House: Rohan
- Father: Charles de Rohan
- Mother: Jeanne Armande de Schomberg

Charles de Rohan (30 September 1655 – 10 October 1727) was a French nobleman. His primary title was Duke of Montbazon, and before acceding to that title he was known by his other title, prince de Guéméné. He was the son of Charles de Rohan and Jeanne Armande de Schomberg.

== Biography ==
Born Charles de Rohan, his father was prince de Guéméné and ranked as one of the princes étrangers at the French court, by virtue of the House of Rohans claimed descent from the Dukes of Brittany

His mother was Jeanne Armande de Schomberg. She was a daughter of Henri de Schomberg who was a Marshal of France. He was the eldest of four children.

He married twice, firstly to Marie Anne d'Albert, daughter of Louis Charles, duc de Luynes and Anne de Rohan. Her half sister was Jeanne Baptiste d'Albert de Luynes, mistress of Victor Amadeus II, Duke of Savoy. She was the grand daughter of Marie de Rohan, the famous duchesse de Chevreuse; as such they were second cousins sharing the same great grand parents. The couple were married on 19 February 1678 and had no children. Marie Anne died in 1679 aged just sixteen.

Charles was then wed to Charlotte Élisabeth de Cochefilet (styled Mademoiselle de Vauvineux prior to marriage) on 30 November 1679, just nine months after Marie Anne's death. The couple had fourteen children.

He held the subsidiary titles of Count of Sainte-Maure, of La Haye and of La Nouatre.

He died at the château de Rochefort-en-Beauce aged seventy two. He was succeeded by his son. His third son was the founder of the Rochefort line of the House of Rohan. His male line descendants currently live in Austria, having fled France during the French Revolution.

== Issue ==
- Charlotte de Rohan (20 December 1680 – 20 September 1733) never married, no issue;
- François Armand de Rohan, Prince of Montbazon (4 December 1682 – 26 June 1717) married Louise Julie de La Tour d'Auvergne had a child who lived for three years;
- Hercule Mériadec de Rohan, Prince of Guéméné (13 November 1688 – 21 December 1757) married Louise Gabrielle Julie de Rohan, had issue;
- Charles de Rohan, Prince of Rohan-Montauban, Prince of Rochefort (7 August 1693 – 25 February 1766) married Eléonore Eugénie de Béthisy de Mézières and had issue; grandparents of the Princess of Carignan and Duke of Elbeuf;
- Armand Jules de Rohan (10 February 1695 – 28 August 1762) Archbishop-Duke of Reims, Premier Pair de France, no issue;
- Louis César Constantin de Rohan (24 March 1697 – 11 March 1779) Cardinal, no issue.
