= Sainte-Maure =

Commune in Grand Est, France

- Commune
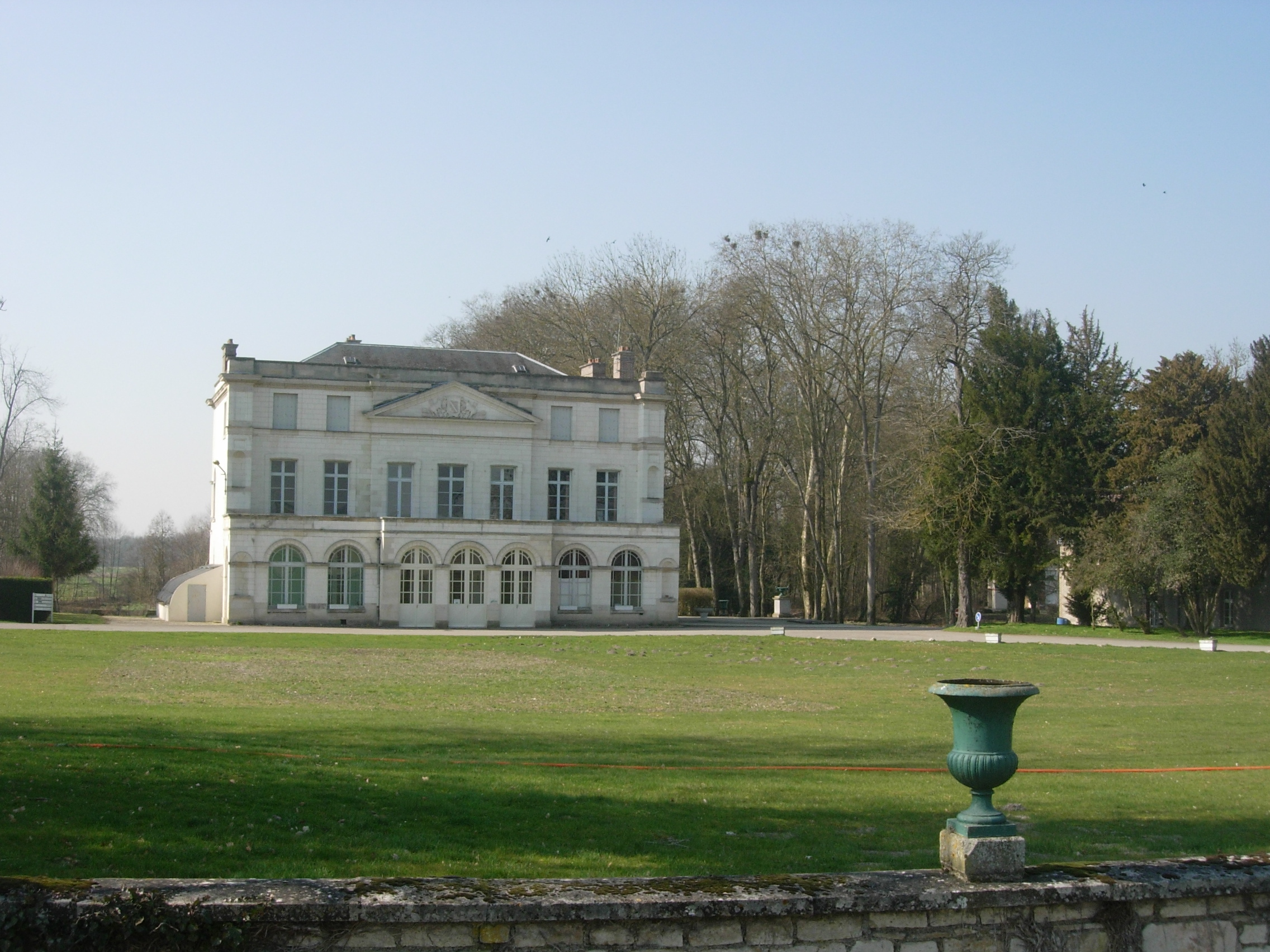
- Chateau

- Coat of arms
- Location of Sainte-Maure
- Location within France Location within Grand Est
- Coordinates: 48°20′43″N 4°03′44″E
- Country: France
- Region: Grand Est
- Department: Aube
- Arrondissement: Troyes
- Canton: Creney-près-Troyes
- Intercommunality: CA Troyes Champagne Métropole

Government
  - Mayor (2020–2026): Denis Pottier
- Area^{1}: 20.92 km^{2} (8.08 sq mi)
- Elevation: 111 m (364 ft)
- Population (2023): 1,801
  - Density: 86.09/km^{2} (223.0/sq mi)
- Time zone: UTC+01:00 (CET)
  - Summer (DST): UTC+02:00 (CEST)
- INSEE/Postal code: 10352 /10150
- ^{1} French Land Register data, which excludes lakes, ponds, glaciers > 1 km^{2} (0.386 sq mi or 247 acres) and river estuaries.

Sainte-Maure (French pronunciation: [sɛ̃t mɔʁ]) is a commune in the Aube department in Grand Est region, France.

== Population ==
Historical population
Year	Pop.	±% p.a.
1968	706	—
1975	1,003	+5.14%
1982	1,178	+2.32%
1990	1,218	+0.42%
1999	1,211	−0.06%
2007	1,473	+2.48%
2012	1,439	−0.47%
2017	1,655	+2.84%
2023	1,801	+1.42%
Source: INSEE

== See also ==
- Communes of the Aube department
