= Jules, Prince of Guéméné =

Jules
- Prince of Guéméné
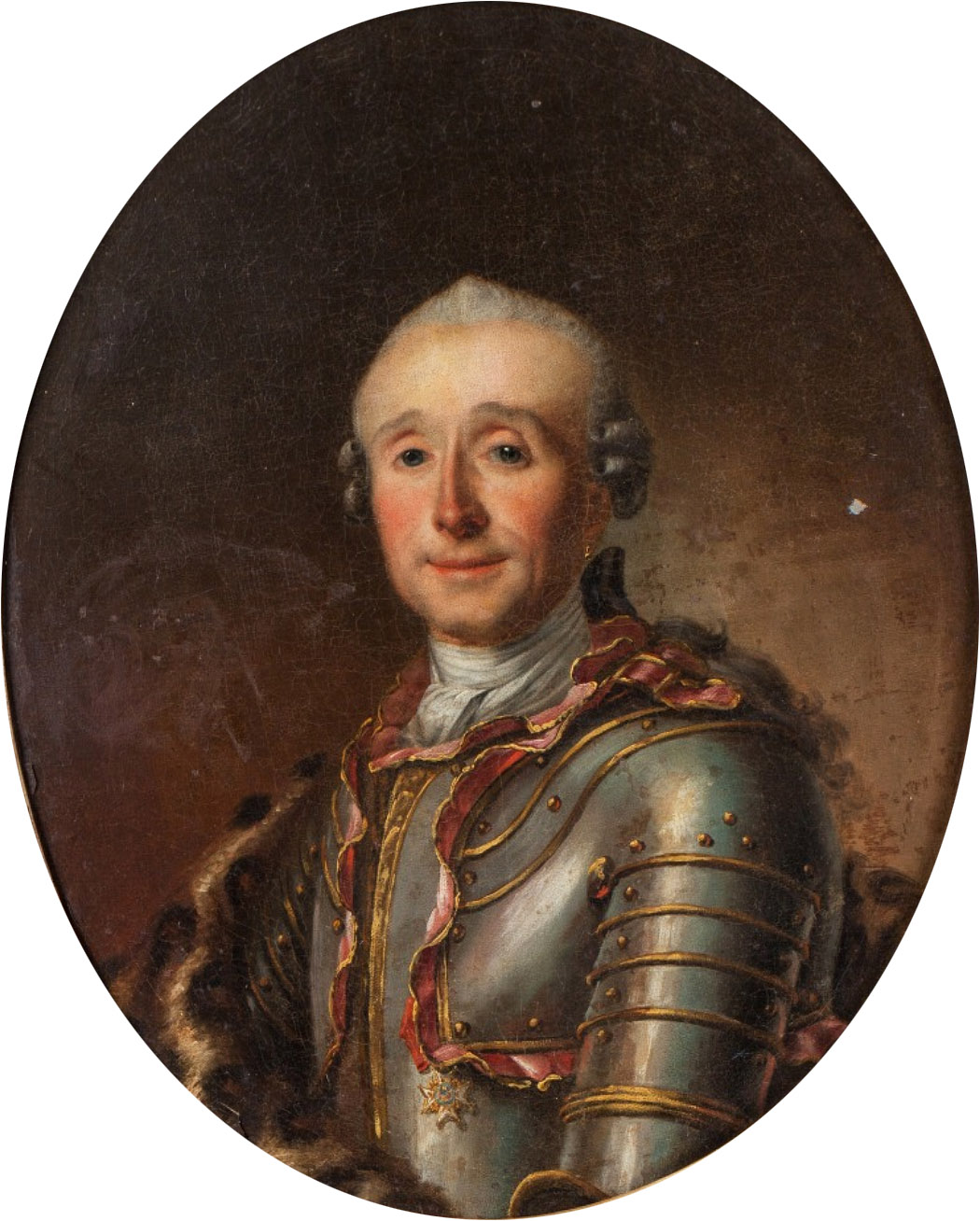
- Born: 25 March 1726; Paris, France
- Died: 10 December 1788 (aged 62); Belgium
- Spouse: Marie Louise de La Tour d'Auvergne
- Issue: Henri Louis, Prince of Guéméné
Names
- Jules Hercule Mériadec de Rohan
- House: Rohan
- Father: Hercule Mériadec, Prince of Guéméné
- Mother: Louise Gabrielle Julie de Rohan

Jules de Rohan (Jules Hercule Mériadec; 25 March 1726 – 10 December 1788) was Prince of Guéméné. Born in Paris, he died in Carlsbourg in the Walloon Region of what is now Belgium (when he died the area was part of France).

== Early life ==
Jules was the oldest son of Hercule Mériadec, Prince of Guéméné (1688–1757) and Louise Gabrielle Julie de Rohan (1704–1741).

His maternal grandparents were Hercule Mériadec de Rohan, Prince of Soubise and Anne Geneviève de Lévis.

== Personal life ==
On 10 February 1743 he married Marie Louise de La Tour d'Auvergne (1725–1793), daughter of Charles Godefroy de La Tour d'Auvergne, Duke of Bouillon and Maria Karolina Sobieska. Together, Jules and Marie Louise had one son:

- Henri Louis de Rohan, Duke of Montbazon, Prince of Guéméné (1745–1809), who married a second cousin, Victoire de Rohan, daughter of Charles de Rohan, Prince of Soubise and Anne Therese of Savoy; she was the sister of the Princess of Condé and posthumous step-daughter of Madame de Soubise.

The Prince of Guéméné died in Belgium in 1788. His son, daughter-in-law, and grandchildren fled to Bohemia before the French Revolution.

== Ancestry ==
Ancestors of Jules, Prince of Guéméné

8. Charles II, Prince of Guéméné
4. Charles de Rohan, Prince of Guéméné
9. Jeanne Armande de Schomberg
2. Hercule Mériadec de Rohan, Prince of Guéméné
10. Charles de Cochefilet, Count of Vauvineux
5. Charlotte Élisabeth de Cochefilet
11. Françoise Angélique Aubéry
1. Jules de Rohan, Prince of Guéméné
12. François de Rohan, Prince of Soubise
6. Hercule Mériadec de Rohan, Duke of Rohan-Rohan
13. Anne de Rohan-Chabot, Princess of Soubise
3. Louise Gabrielle Julie de Rohan
14. Louis Charles de Lévis, Duke of Ventadour
7. Anne Geneviève de Lévis
15. Charlotte de La Motte Houdancourt
