= Marie Louise de La Tour d'Auvergne =

Marie Louise
- Princess of Guéméné
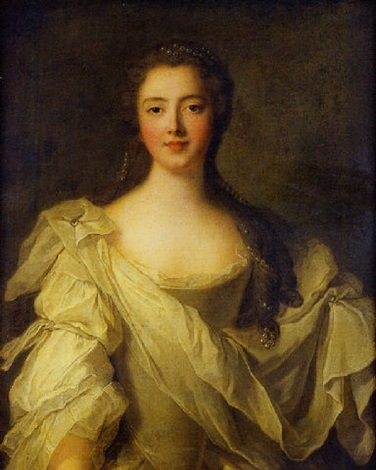
- Born: 15 August 1725; Hotel de Bouillon, Paris, France
- Died: 1781; Paris, France
- Spouse: Jules Hercule Mériadec de Rohan
- Issue Detail: Henri Louis Marie, Prince of Guéméné
Names
- Marie Louise Henriette Jeanne de La Tour d'Auvergne
- Father: Charles Godefroy de La Tour d'Auvergne
- Mother: Maria Karolina Sobieska

Marie Louise de La Tour d'Auvergne (Marie Louise Henriette Jeanne; 15 August 1725 – 24 September 1781) was a French noblewoman and member of the House of La Tour d'Auvergne. She became duchess of Montbazon through her 1743 marriage to Jules de Rohan and was known as princess of Rohan from 1749. Between 1747 and 1748, she conducted an affair with her first cousin, Charles Edward Stuart, next in line in the Jacobite succession.

== Biography ==
=== Ancestry and early life ===
Louise was the first child of Charles Godefroy de La Tour d'Auvergne, Prince of Turenne and his wife, Maria Karolina “Charlotte” Sobieska. Charlotte Sobieska was the granddaughter of King John III Sobieski of Poland (famous as the winner of the Battle of Vienna) and the older sister of Maria Clementina Sobieska, wife of the Jacobite pretender James Francis Edward Stuart. As their family's last members, Charlotte and Clementina were co-heiresses to the vast Sobieski lands and fortune in Poland. Through her mother's aunt, Theresa Kunegunda Sobieska, Louise was also second cousin to Emperor Charles VIII, Maria Antonia, Electress of Saxony, and Empress Maria Josepha. Louise's paternal family, the House of La Tour d'Auvergne, were known as the Bouillons after the duchy of Bouillon where they reigned as sovereigns. Reflecting this, they were considered princes étrangères in France, entitled to be called altesse (“highness”), and female family members had the coveted right of the tabouret (meaning that they could sit on a short stool without a back and armrest in the royal presence).

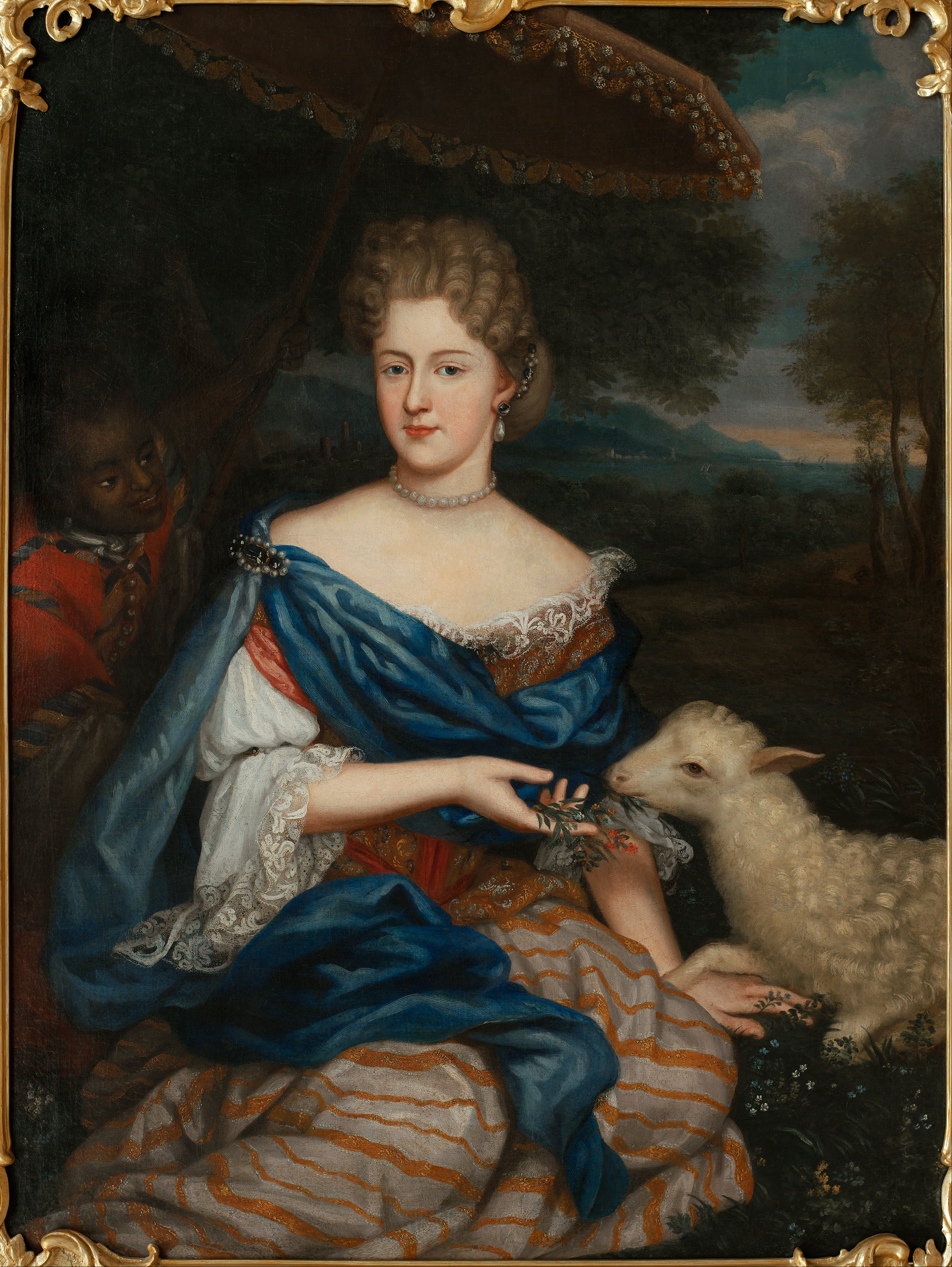
Charlotte Sobieska, Duchess of Bouillon, in 1730.

Charlotte Sobieska had been married to the elder Bouillon brother, Frédéric Maurice Casimir. This was considered a prestigious marriage and a great success for the Bouillons, but the husband died of smallpox within two weeks of the wedding. His father, Emmanuel Théodose de La Tour d'Auvergne, who had arranged the marriage, was unwilling to return Charlotte's dowry to her father (as he needed the money to settle his debts), and convinced her to marry his second son, Charles Godefroy. Charlotte's father, James Louis Sobieski, Prince of Oława, did not consent to the second marriage and was furious over the loss of the dowry; he broke off all communication with his daughter.

The marriage of Louise's parents was strained and often unhappy, although letters by Charlotte from the late 1730s show love and affection for her husband. Charlotte had been promised a quasi-royal position by her in-laws, and was dismayed to be treated like other duchesses at the French court, so she chose to live in social isolation in Paris. Charles Godefroy was known for womanising, heavy drinking, fighting, and gambling, and he accrued heavy debts. Contemporaries nevertheless considered him “a man of honour and integrity”, and he enjoyed King Louis XV's favour and friendship. In 1730, he inherited the titles of grand chamberlain, grand master, and grand squire from his father, as well as the Duchy of Bouillon. The family lived in one of Paris' most luxurious palaces, the Hôtel de Bouillon, and had a country seat, the Château de Navarre.

In the first years of her life, Louise was entrusted to a wet nurse, Madame Bacquet, who was still alive when Louise died in 1781. She was raised in the Chasse-Midi (or Cherche-Midi) convent on the rue de Chasse-Midi in Paris, belonging to the Religieuses bénédictines de Notre-Dame de Consolation (“Benedictine Sisters of Our Lady of Consolation”), one of the most fashionable boarding schools for aristocratic girls. She had a governess, Mademoiselle de Minières, who probably had more influence in her childhood than her mother. She had a younger brother, Godefroy Charles Henri, born in 1728. She was known by the courtesy title mademoiselle d'Auvergne or mademoiselle de Bouillon, or as the princess of Bouillon.

=== Life in Poland and first marriage plans ===
==== Background ====
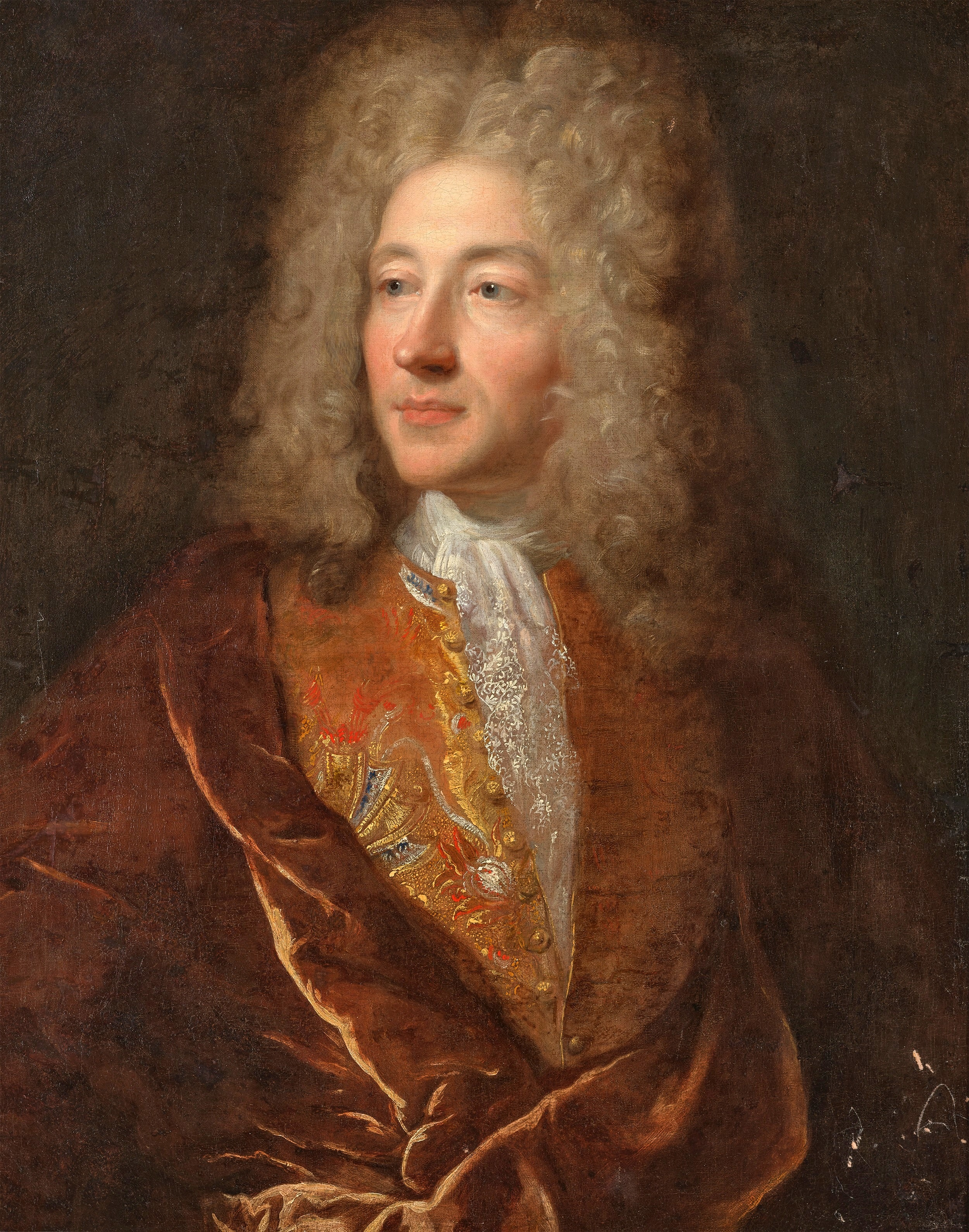
James Louis Sobieski, Louise's maternal grandfather, in 1699.

In September 1735, Louise's mother travelled to Żółkiew in Poland (today Zhovkva, Ukraine) to attempt reconciliation with her father, James Louis Sobieski, Prince of Oława. Following the death of her sister Clementina earlier that year, the Bouillons hoped to secure the Sobieski inheritance to repay their debts. Sobieski refused to see Charlotte but showed interest in his grandchildren, asking why Louise had not come to Poland. He suggested that she could marry Frederick Christian of Saxony, eldest son of King Augustus III of Poland. Charlotte did not want Louise to marry too soon and miss a better match (there were by then numerous proposals for the ten-year-old). She wrote to her husband that Louise was “rich enough and of a good enough house to marry well without leaving” France and begged him not to send Louise to Poland unless the Polish king had clearly committed to an engagement.

It was concluded by the Bouillons that the only way to persuade Sobieski about the inheritance was through Louise, arguing that it would be dishonourable to disinherit the grandchildren for their mother's error. Charlotte, however, still refused to use her daughter as a pawn, especially because now only the second-born son of the Polish king, Francis Xavier of Saxony, was being mentioned as her possible husband. Nevertheless, after Sobieski finally received Charlotte in February 1735, father and daughter became close, and Charlotte asked her husband to send Louise to Poland. Her possible marriage to Francis Xavier became European news.

==== Life in Poland ====
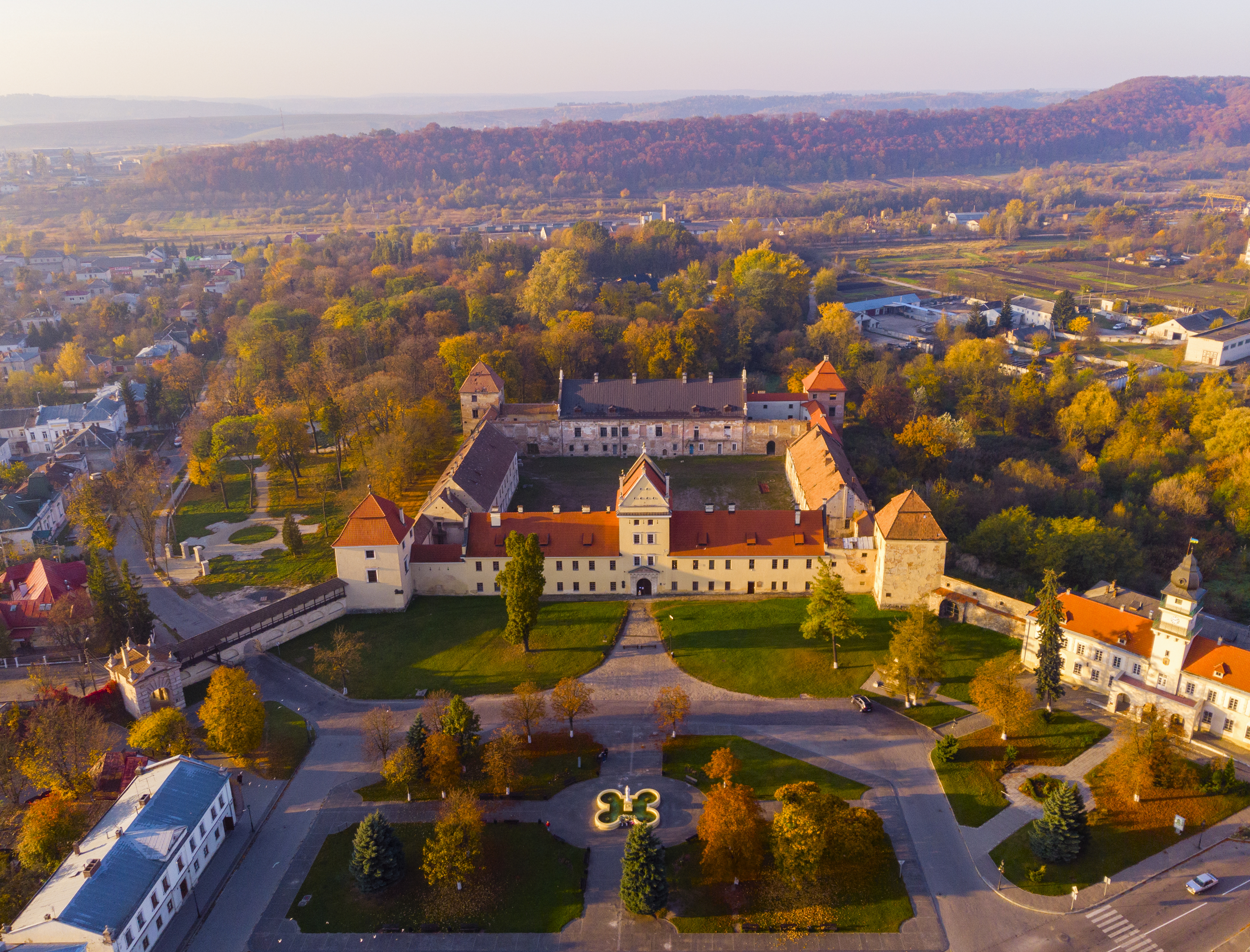
The former Sobieski residence, Zhovkva/Żółkiew Castle, where Louise lived, today.

On 13 June 1736, eleven-year-old Louise started the journey to Poland with her governess, Mademoiselle de Minières, her father's surgeon, Jean Henri Bourgeois, and servants. She was told that she would marry a son of the Polish king. The travel was difficult because of bad roads and storms. While her letters to her father prove Louise's affection for him, she had been alienated from her mother by Charles Godefroy and his advisors. She was received in Żółkiew on 25 August with public honours. Her grandfather was impressed by her and wanted to spend as much time together as possible, but he and Charlotte fought over who would control Louise's marriage.

In October 1736, the Polish royal couple ended marriage negotiations, saying that their six-year-old son was too young. Charlotte called this rejection a “disgrace” and a “shame for our house”. Charles Godefroy, meanwhile, tried to persuade Sobieski to leave his estate directly to Louise, bypassing Charlotte's claim. Augustus III of Poland offered to make Louise his ward and raise her at his court if she was made her grandfather's sole heir. This plan was “very much to [the] taste” of Charles Godefroy but opposed by Charlotte, who feared to create the impression that the Bouillons could not afford to marry their daughter off themselves. However, according to Polish law, Louise could not inherit the Sobieski lands unless she married a Polish prince, and the plan faltered.

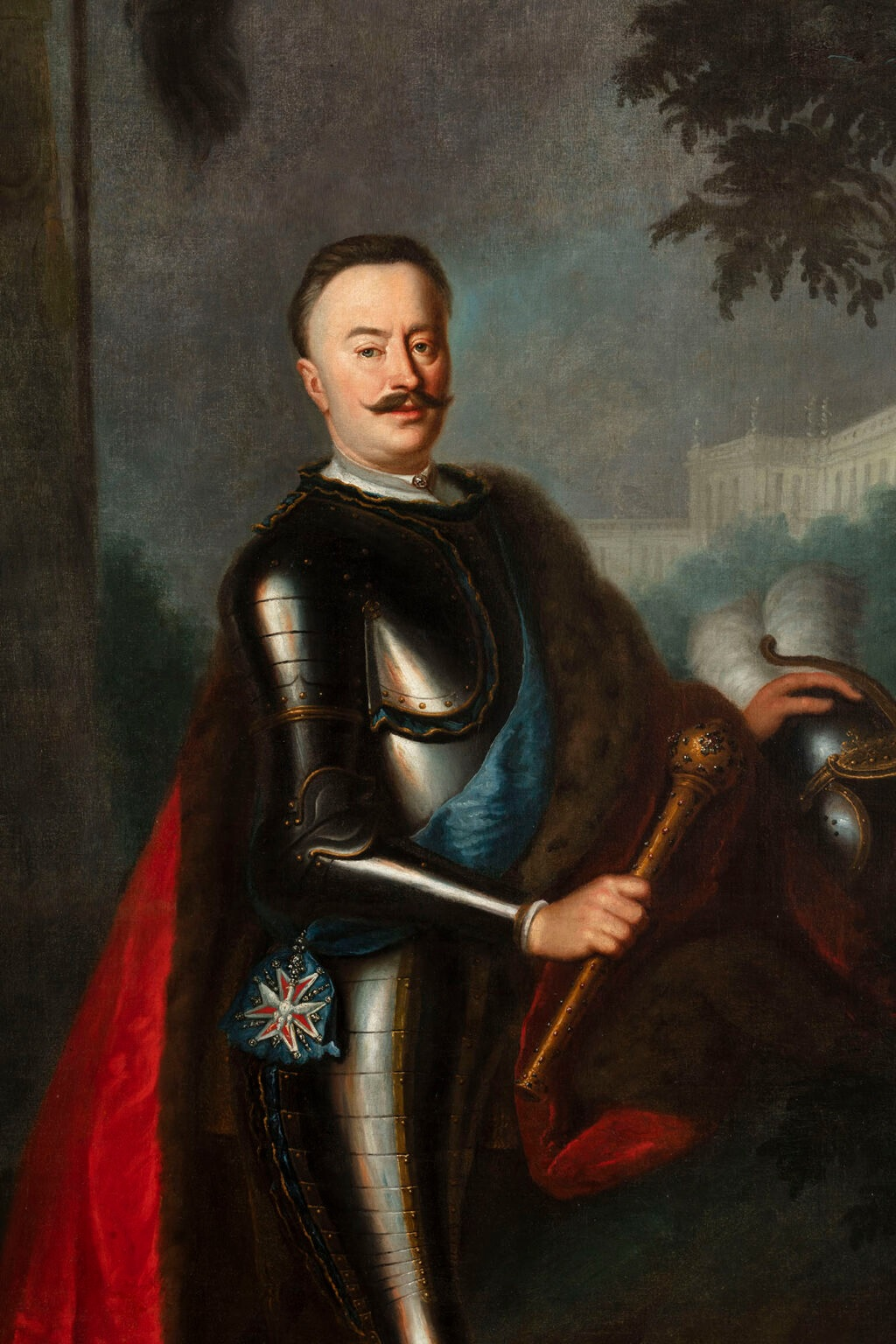
Jan Klemens Branicki, one of Louise's early suitors, on a painting from 1749 or 1750.

Because of their differing financial interests, the marriage of Louise's parents completely broke down. Charles Godefroy offered to give back Charlotte's dowry if she promised never to return to France. He asked his envoy to tell Louise how much he loved and missed her. She herself took her father's side and her relationship with her mother was contentious. Charlotte said that Louise was “so sullen and so ill-bred that she brought [Charlotte] shame”, complaining that “I do all that I can to show her my maternal tenderness and I believe few mothers do as much [as I do]”. She believed that her husband's agents “inspired distrust and disobedience” in Louise towards her.

In April 1737, Charles Godefroy suggested to Sobieski that Louise should marry one of her maternal cousins, the Stuart princes, and instructed his wife to send Louise to France. Sobieski, however, was still negotiating her marriage with Polish nobles and feared humiliation. One candidate was 90-year-old Prince Janusz-Antoni Wiśniowiecki, castellan of Kraków, whose suit Charlotte rejected as he was known for his “debauched” lifestyle. This suggests that Charlotte was trying to spare Louise her own fate of being married to a drunk and adulterous man. Among many other Polish nobles, the most likely suitor was Jan Klemens Branicki, aged 48, one of the most powerful and richest magnates of the country, whom Sobieski and Charlotte hoped would become king. Twelve-year-old Louise was instructed by her father's agent to “obey [her father] like God” and to say “no” in any marriage ceremony, unless “she had seen an order from the hand” of Charles Godefroy. She was also told “how dear she was” to Charles Godefroy and how many tears he shed for her. She was surrounded by violent fights between her father, mother, and grandfather over her, which probably traumatised her for life.

Your orders will be, all my life, law for me. I would more easily suffer death than to stray from your will for a moment. [...] I am still uncertain of what time I will have the happiness of kissing the hand of My dear Papa and of assuring him of the profound respect and full submission of his little daughter.

— Louise de La Tour d'Auvergne, letter to his father (Bongie 1986, 66)

Although Sobieski seems to have genuinely loved his granddaughter, he was prone to violent bouts of rage. Once, he questioned Louise why she had not yet learnt Polish. She replied that it was a difficult language, at which Sobieski became so angry that she started sobbing and fled to her governess. When Louise went to say goodnight to him, Sobieski pushed her away. She could barely sleep and was still distressed the next day. Sobieski declared that he no longer considered Charles Godefroy his son-in-law and consequently Charlotte was his mistress and Louise a bastard. Nevertheless, Louise generally remained a favourite at her grandfather's court, surrounded with celebrations, dancing, and music.

At Charles Godefroy's request, Louis XV asked Augustus II of Poland for a written promise by Sobieski not to marry Louise without her parents' consent. In December 1737, after being assured of the support of the French and Polish kings, Charles Godefroy ordered his daughter to leave Żółkiew immediately, telling her staff not to have “any consideration for her health or for the [cold] season”. He added that whether Charlotte “stays in Poland or goes to China”, he was “totally indifferent” to her fate and he stopped sending her annuity (the interest on her own dowry). The family conflict was ended by James Sobieski's sudden death on 19 December 1737. He left his entire estate to Louise on the condition that she marry Francis Xavier of Saxony, but the king of Poland suppressed the document as he feared that it would upset the Polish nobility. This led to extensive litigation between Sobieski's heirs.

Louise stayed a little longer in Poland due to a marriage proposal from Charles Theodor, Elector of Bavaria, but her mother's negotiations did not succeed. By the time she left Poland, Louise and her mother were completely estranged. Charlotte wrote to her husband, “I send you back your daughter, since you desire it so much, and about whom I do not want to hear from now on”. Louise's biographer Bongie concluded that she detested her mother. They reportedly fought bitterly before her departure. Leaving around mid-May, Louise was back in the Chasse-Midi convent by summer 1738, and she never communicated with her mother again. Charlotte died on 8 May 1740 in Poland, following a long illness.

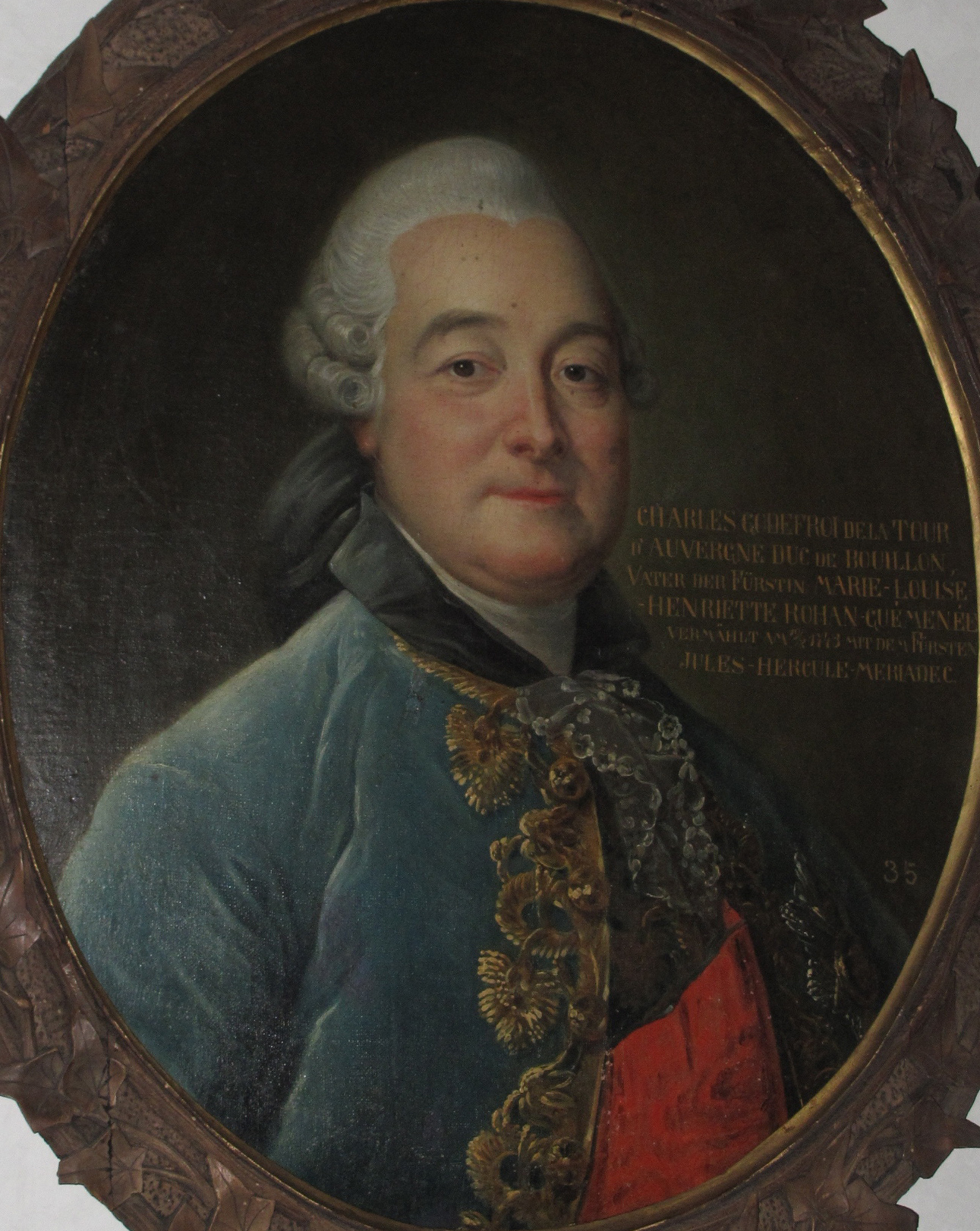
Charles Godefroy de La Tour d'Auvergne, Duke of Bouillon, Louise's father, in 1750.

=== Life at Chasse-Midi and French marriage plans ===
Little is known of Louise's youth and education, but she did have a large staff at the convent, including a valet de chambre, a footman, a maid, a maid of the wardrobe, and a cook. Marriage plans continued. The most likely candidate, preferred by her father, was Louis Marie Léopold de Lorraine-Harcourt, Prince of Guise, aged seventeen. Guise was the brother of Louise's paternal step-grandmother, Louise Henriette Françoise de Lorraine, who probably suggested the idea to Charles Godefroy in 1737 (the two had an affair, Charles Godefroy being a year older than his stepmother). Guise was well-connected at the French court and considered an advantageous match for Louise, but her mother fervently refused the idea as she considered him “debauched”. Nevetheless, her father started marriage negotiations in late 1738. The betrothal had just been agreed when Guise's father suddenly died in April 1739 and he backed out.

In March 1740, Louis XV granted an annuity of 12 000 livres to fourteen-year-old Louise. Her paternal grandfather had held valuable tobacco plantations in his viscounty of Turenne. When the King seized these, he granted the annuity as a compensation to the family. However, in 1738, Louise's father sold the entire viscounty to the French state to settle his gambling debts, thereby losing the annuity. In 1740, he convinced the King that some revenues had not been calculated into the purchase price and Louis XV reinstated the allowance as compensation. The Duke asked that it be paid directly to his daughter, himself being unable to provide a suitable dowry.

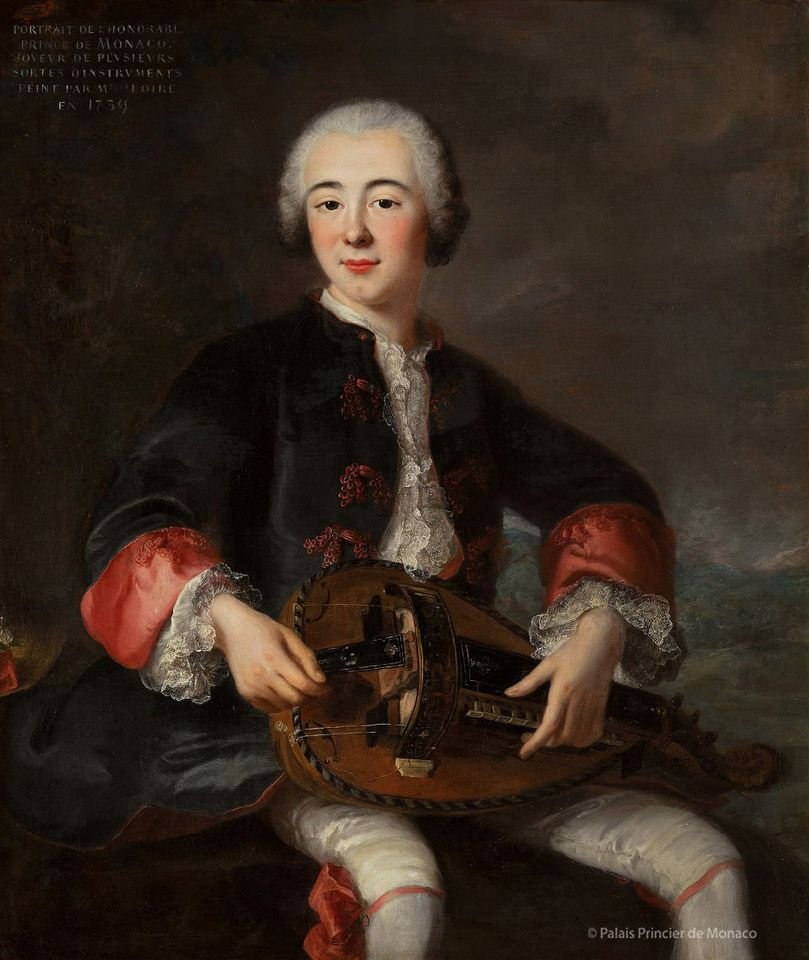
Honoré III of Monaco, Louise's first fiancé, in 1739.

==== Betrothal to Honoré III of Monaco ====
In December 1740, fifteen-year-old Louise's marriage was arranged to the wealthy Honoré III, Prince of Monaco, aged twenty. The engagement, with royal assent, was announced officially on 1 February 1741. The wedding was planned for May or June, as the Hôtel de Bouillon needed to be renovated for the couple's use. Soon afterwards, Louise received an anonymous letter claiming that her fiancé was in love with another woman. Honoré admitted to his father that he was in a relationship with the widowed Madame de Néri, and had only signed the marriage contract reluctantly. On 19 March, the engagement was broken off by Louise's father. Honoré's behaviour caused great scandal in Versailles and everyone pitied Louise. This failed engagement seems to have had a lasting effect on Louise, causing her to fear abandonment.

=== Marriage ===
In February 1743, Charles Godefroy announced Louise's engagement to Jules Hercule Mériadec de Rohan, Prince of Guéméné. Alongside Louise's father, the Rohan-Guéménés were among the most important supporters of the Jacobite pretenders, and the Stuart family therefore fully endorsed the union. On 6 February, Louise was presented at court by her aunt, Marie Hortense Victoire de La Tour d'Auvergne, Madame de La Trémoille, so she could ceremonially take her seat on the tabouret. This had to happen before her marriage to claim the Bouillon's privilege as princes étrangers. It was agreed that for the wedding, the groom would be known as le prince Jules and Louise as la princesse de Rohan, to represent their claim on the title of Jules' maternal grandfather, Hercule Mériadec de Rohan-Soubise. When presented to the king, Jules was titled duke of Montbazon.

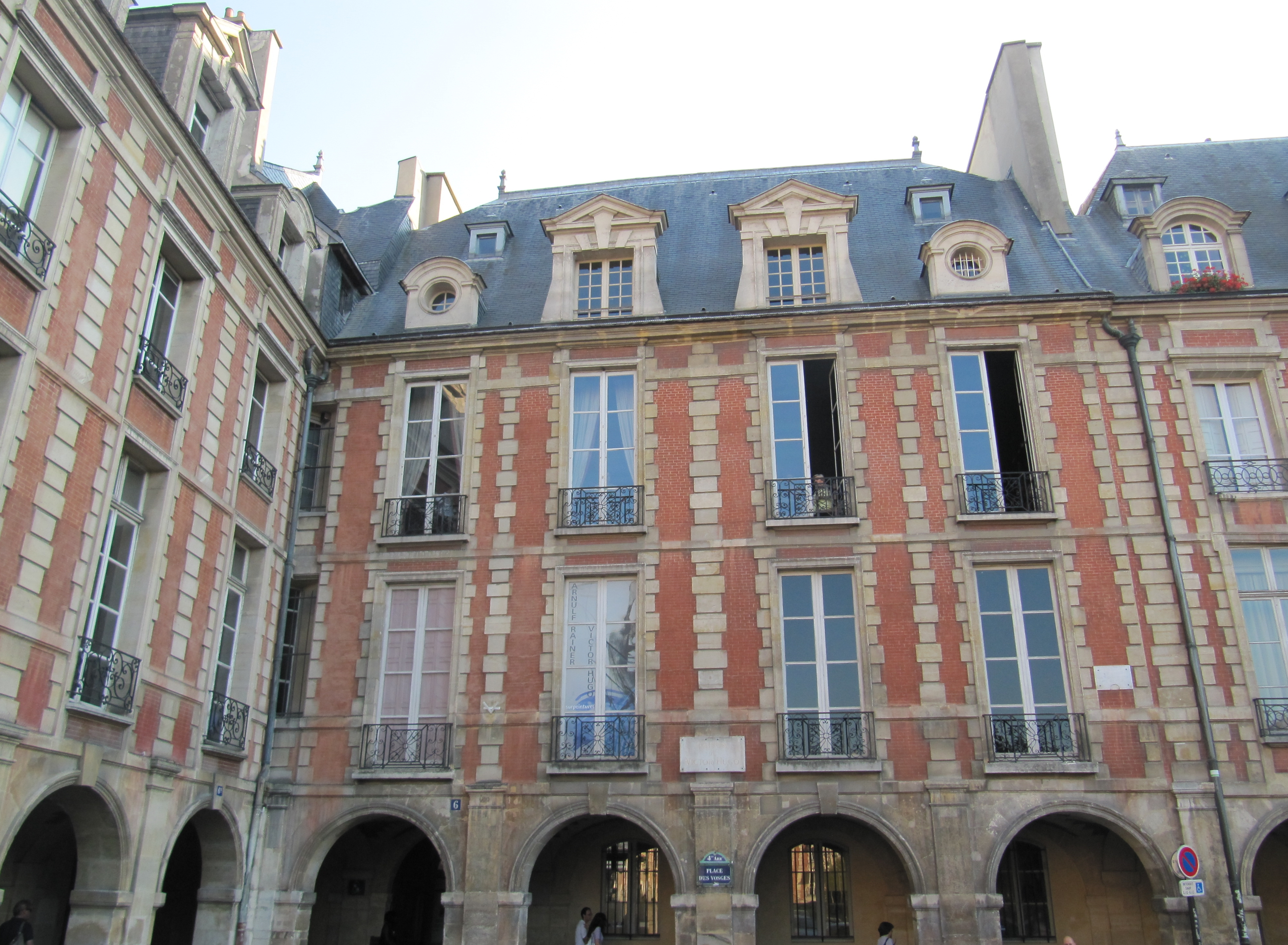
The Maison de Victor Hugo, formerly Hôtel de Guéméné, where Louise spent much of her adult life.

The betrothal took place on 17 February 1741 in the evening, in the Œil-de-Bœuf room of Versailles; Louise was not yet seventeen and Jules almost sixteen. First, the marriage contract was signed by the entire royal family and the couple, then a blessing ceremony was celebrated by the groom's grand-uncle, Armand de Rohan, Cardinal de Soubise. Louise wore a black-and-gold robe de cour with a golden mesh mantle borne by her husband's cousin, Eléonore Louise Constance de Rohan, Mademoiselle de Montauban. The wedding itself took place two days later in the Paris residence of Louise's grand-uncle, Henri Oswald, Cardinal d'Auvergne, who lent them his bed for the wedding night.

Louise's mother-in-law, Louise Gabrielle Julie de Rohan-Soubise, Princess of Guéméné (known as Madame de Guéméné) required the young couple to live at her Paris residence in the Hôtel de Rohan-Guéméné (today Maison de Victor Hugo) on the place Royal (today place des Vosges). On 31 March, Louise presented again at court as the duchess of Montbazon. She gave birth to a son, Henri Louis Marie, on 30 August 1745.

Around 10 November 1746, Louise contracted smallpox. His father immediately travelled to her and they were quarantined together. On 14 November, the family received a sympathy note from Louise's first cousin, Charles Edward Stuart. Louise's quarantine ended on 22 December, and on that day Charles Edward travelled to the Bouillon country seat, the Château de Navarre, to spend Christmas with his relatives. There is no proof of attraction between the two from this time. Despite their clashing financial interests in the Sobieski inheritance, the Stuarts and the Bouillons had always corresponded amicably with each other. Charles Edward was close with his uncle, Louise's father, and spent a lot of time with him whenever he was in France, but it is unknown when the cousins first met or how much they had interacted before 1746.

=== Affair with Charles Edward Stuart ===
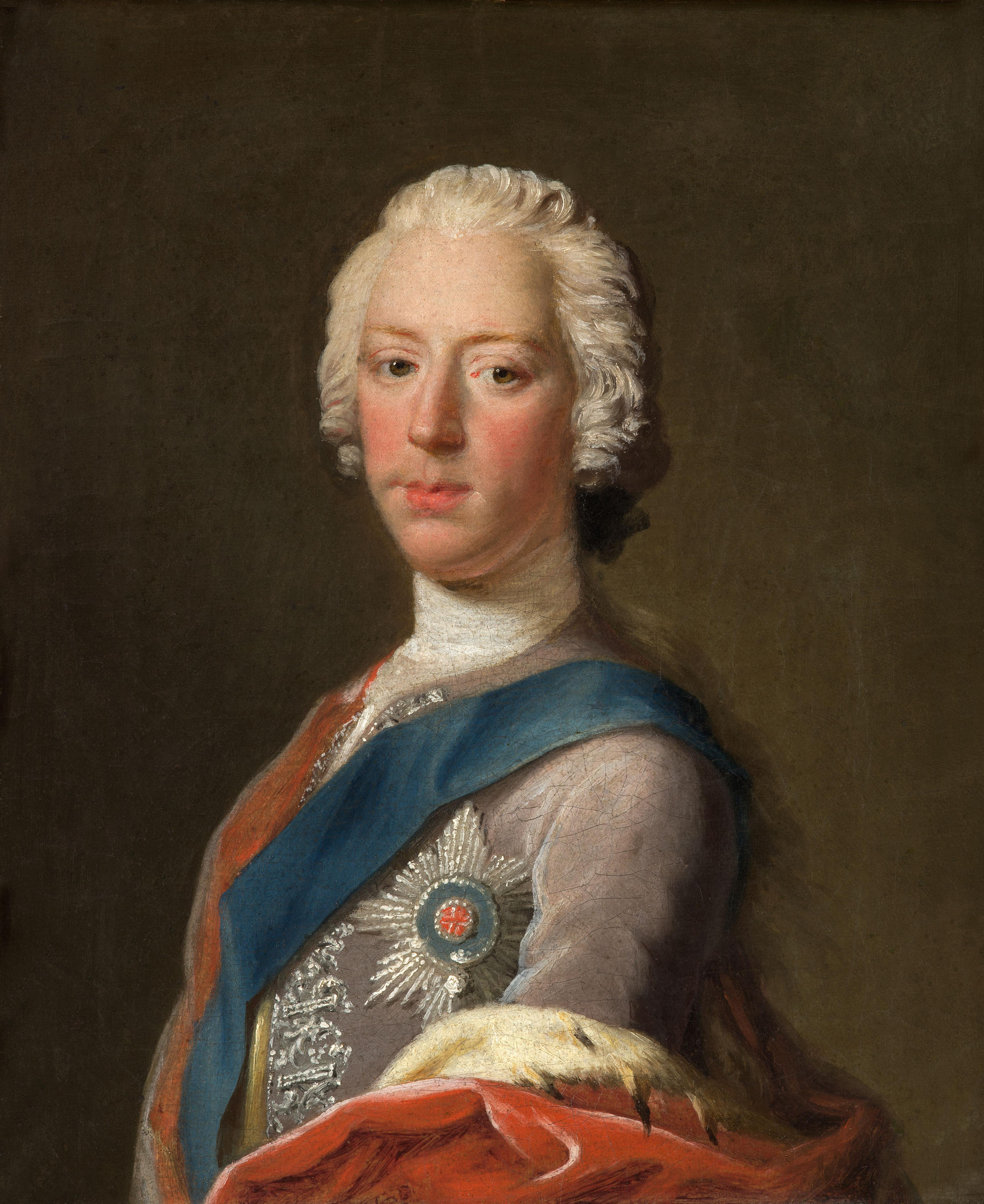
Charles Edward Stuart.

In the summer of 1747, Charles Edward was depressed due to the failure of his previous political plans and conflicts with his father. In July, he moved to the Saint-Ouen country house of Charles de Rohan, Prince of Soubise (who had been married to Louise's aunt, Anne Marie Louise de La Tour d'Auvergne). He became a celebrity among aristocratic women, a diversion while most men were serving in the War of Austrian Succession. On 13 August, he was hosted at dinner by Louise and her mother-in-law, Madame de Guéméné, in their Paris residence. At the end of August, he took a long holiday at the Château de Navarre. The affair between Louise and him probably started there or immediately afterwards in Saint-Ouen. This was the first known intimate relationship of Charles Edward, who had taken a vow of chastity as part of his strict regime of preparation for retaking the British throne.

Little is known about how or exactly where and when the affair started, other than that it happened in a country house (probably either in the Bouillon country seat or Charles Edward's summer residence), probably either in late August or early September 1747. Bongie sees the relationship as an act of rebellion by Charles Edward against his former disciplined and obedient self and his father's authority; at the same time he contemplated marriage to a Protestant princess and hunted illegally on royal grounds. He characterises the affair as “obsessive and insane”, Charles Edward putting aside his previous notions of royal duty and risking the Jacobite cause for Louise. Nevertheless, at first, the two hid their relationship diligently and successfully. Louise was surveilled by her mother-in-law, who tasked servants with watching her. Until late October 1747, the two could meet easily in Charles Edward's Saint-Ouen house, which Louise could visit under pretense of seeing her uncle, and they could spend time together publicly. As a sign of his affection, Charles Edward offered to give up his share of the contested Sobieski inheritance to Louise and her brother. Some time in late October, Louise became pregnant. Charles Edward took great pleasure in the pregnancy, talking to the baby in the womb.

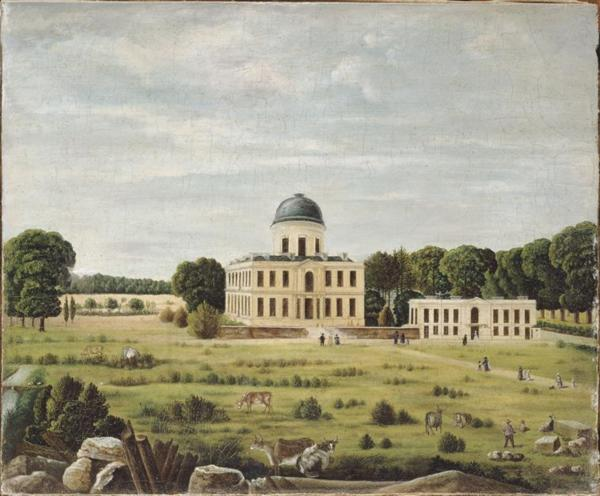
The Château de Navarre in the 19th century.

The measures Charles Edward took to avoid Madame de Guéméné's notice instead drew police attention. On 29 October 1747, the Saint-Denis maréchaussée reported to the lieutenant general of Paris police, Nicolas René Berryer and Jean Frédéric Phélypeaux, Count of Maurepas, secretary of state of the maison du roi, that two or three times a week, a rental carriage approached Charles Edward's Saint Ouen house. This would happen around nine or ten in the evening, or, more often, at five in the morning, and a tall man in a white frock coat would get out and walk down a small road between houses. A local resident had reported the carriage after he tried to approach it and was threatened with a pistol by its passengers. Maurepas created a new secret police division to protect the Jacobite heir from a suspected assassin. On 7 November, the detectives discovered that the carriage took mysterious, heavily armed passengers including the prince's trusted valet, Daniel O'Brien, to a location near the place Royale (Louise's Paris address) through convoluted routes, almost every night. By mid-November, it was ascertained that the trips were made by members of the princely household and surveillance ended.

In December 1747, Louise's husband, Jules de Rohan, returned from the battlefield, causing Charles Edward to become extremely jealous and possessive. Even Louise's continued promises that she only loved him made him more suspicious. He moved closer to her, taking a residence near the Porte Saint-Honoré. The situation escalated quickly: one time, Charles Edward tried to break into Louise's house despite her begging him not to, and was almost caught by servants. He threatened to leave Louise and even create public scandal unless allowed access to Louise's bedroom at any time, telling her, “you must understand that you are agreeable to us only insofar as you yield to our pleasures”. He accused Louise of taking other lovers; she had to swear not to sleep with her husband anymore and to ask an unnamed male acquaintance to visit her less often. Louise wanted to be more careful and occasionally asked Charles Edward to postpone his visit until a safer time, to which he responded with threatening to leave her forever. When Louise herself asked Charles Edward stop his “cruelties”, or she would leave him, he threatened to force his way into her house publicly and cause a scandal, or abandon her and her child.

Draft of a letter from Charles Edward to Louise, December 1747 or January 1748

I swear to you that this will be my last letter and that neither tears nor simpering will do if the slightest repetition [of being denied entry to Louise's bedroom] occurs. [...] I shall come this night [...] and if I meet with the slightest obstacle I swear to take my revenge, and with all suitable commotion. Till tonight at eleven-thirty then, when we shall see each other, or never again!

— Charles Edward Stuart, quotes Bongie 1986, p. 392

Charles Edward received reports on Louise's behaviour from her confidant, Anne-Françoise de Carteret. Carteret (born before 1719) was a poor gentlewoman from a loyal Jacobite family, recommended to the Boullions by the Stuarts in 1740. She served as governess to Louise's youngest aunt, Marie Sophie Charlotte de La Tour d'Auvergne (who was four years younger than her niece), and she seems to have been close to both her and Louise at the Chasse-Midi convent. Charles Edward granted Carteret a pension for life in late December 1747, despite his usual reluctance to financially help Jacobites. He probably expected Carteret to spy on Louise in exchange. In mid-December, Louise's mother-in-law, Madame de Guéméné announced at the dinner table that she was hearing strange noises at night and ordered one of his servants to keep watch; Louise told her lover that she was “more dead than alive” from fear. Charles Edward asked Carteret for a report, thinking that Louise might have lied about the incident to keep him away and conduct another affair instead. Carteret, however, confirmed Louise's version of events and claimed Louise often told her that she loved only Charles Edward.

==== End of the affair ====
In fact, Madame de Guéméné had secretly been aware of her daughter-in-law's affair, and hinted at her knowledge of it in the hopes that Louise would be too scared to continue. As this did not happen, she conspired with Louise's father to end the affair during a time Louise's husband, the Duke of Montbazon would be away from Paris. Rumour was starting to spread and they feared what would happen if Montbazon heard them. While it was accepted that a royal prince could take a married aristocratic woman as his mistress, Charles Edward was only nominally prince of Wales, living in exile. The family worried that either ignoring his wife's public adultery or confronting Charles Edward would tarnish their reputation.

On 22 January 1748, Montbazon left Paris to join the royal court at the Château de Marly. The lovers had been eagerly awaiting his departure so they could see each other more easily. They planned to do so during the night of 23 January. Complaining of a headache, Louise retired to her bedroom early, where she was joined soon by her visiting friend Carteret. Her father Charles Godefroy, who had arrived from Marly, was at the same time having a secret conference with Madame de Guéméné. At ten o'clock, Madame de Guéméné and Charles Godefroy entered her bedroom and instructed Carteret to leave. Madame de Guéméné informed Louise that she had known of her affair for a while and wanted to ensure that it remained a secret. She asked her daughter-in-law to promise never to write to or privately meet Charles Edward again. Louise started crying hysterically, and soon, her mother-in-law and father were crying, too. They invited Carteret back into the room and explained to her what had happened.

Louise's father then dictated a polite, firm letter for Louise to send to Charles Edward, with some additions by her mother-in-law. Louise had to inform her lover that the two parents were aware of their affair and remind him of her previous misgivings during their relationship. She further stated that it was her duty to her elders not to see him again privately or receive personal letters from him, but she asked him to continue his afternoon social calls to prevent suspicion. Charles Edward was incensed by what he saw as meddling in his business and interfering with his royal prerogative to keep mistresses. He sent no reply to Louise.

The break-up letter dictated to Louise by her father

What I foresaw only too clearly has indeed come about. My mother-in-law knows everything of your proceedings and she has just come here, accompanied by my father. They have both spoken to me as friends. I am thus obliged, Your Royal Highness, to advise you of this, and you have long been aware of what I told you. I am required by my duty to them never to see you again nor even to receive your letters. If you will do me the honour of coming to visit from time to time, as I believe you will, so as not to ruin me entirely—it is nearly so already—you will be welcomed as before. Adieu, Your Royal Highness. This is a cruel test of my affection for you which will end only with my life.

— quotes Bongie 1986, p. 384

Five days after the forced break-up, Louise smuggled out a secret, four-page letter to Charles Edward describing what had happened to her and begging him to still love her, think of their child, and wait for happier days together. However, by then, Charles Edward had already asked for a full account of the events of 23 January from Carteret. In a letter from 26 or 27 January, Carteret promised him that Louise still loved him deeply and begged him to save her reputation by occasionally visiting her in public. She also recounted what Louise's father had said about Charles Edward: that he had shown no respect for himself or his cousin and repaid the Bouillons' support with evil. These remarks offended Charles Edward deeply. He was angered at Louise for allowing him to be humiliated by her family. At the same time, his political situation was changing: he was planning to leave France and perhaps marry a Protestant German princess.

Excerpts from Louise's follow-up letter to Charles Edward

It has not been possible to write to you since the other day, for I am being constantly watched. It was very cruel of you to refuse to answer the letter I wrote after my unfortunate experience. I was so agitated that I had not strength enough to hold my pen. May I flatter myself that you will still be pleased to hear from the unhappiest of all creatures? [...] I was made to promise that I would never again write to you but I could not wait any longer. [...] [A]ll the evils I shall be required to endure will be as nothing if you continue to love me. Without that, I shall cease to live. Remember that I carry your child in me and that it is for your sake alone that I suffer such affliction. [...] I spend my days and nights weeping, gazing constantly at your portrait and kissing the lock of hair you gave me...

— quotes Bongie 1986, p. 384–385

Louise, however, was still in love with Charles Edward. Surrounded by servants tasked with surveilling her, she continued trying to make contact and begging him to visit or write. Charles Edward only sent some verbal messages, indicating that he might be willing to receive Louise privately at his own house, thus trying to force her to publicly break with her family. Only then would he consider calling on her publicly to save her reputaiton. He accused her of having other lovers, revealing their affair to many, and showing his letters to her family, and added that his lack of writing or visiting was intended as “punishment”. Louise offered to see him at her Versailles apartment, which Charles Edward rejected; she also gave permission to his former lover to sleep with other women during their forced separation as long as he remained faithful emotionally.

On 11 April, Holy Thursday, Louise planned to see Charles Edward under the guise of visiting her uncle, either in his house or her rented carriage, as he preferred. Madame de Guéméné discovered the plan and forbade Louise to go anywhere without her maid. Charles Edward considered this failure to have been Louise's fault, telling her that she should have acted as an adult and not accepted her mother-in-law's rules. Members of the Rohan family organised social events that Charles Edward could attend to disprove rumours of a conflict between the Stuarts and their French supporters over the affair with Louise, but he refused to do so.

In April 1748, Charles Edward started a new relationship with Marie Anne Louise Jablonowska, Princess of Talmont, who would become his first publicly acknowledged mistress. Forty-seven-year-old Madame de Talmont was the cousin of Queen Marie Leszczyńska, distantly related to both Louise and Charles Edward, and a former mistress of Stanisław Leszczyński, the dethroned Polish king. She was known for her contempt for social conventions and thus the exact opposite of Louise. Louise herself continued to propose meeting again at Saint-Ouen, where their affair had begun, after 20 May, when her mother-in-law would be away; Charles Edward gave him no encouragement. She threatened to poison herself, writing fondly about the last night they had spent together and begged him not to take another mistress. She attended theatre and opera performances to see him at a distance. On 27 April, she begged him to attend the opera the next day and “look at [her] with those eyes [she] adore[d]”; in response, Charles Edward appeared in the royal box with Madame de Talmont. According to her letters, Louise rushed to exit and cried unstoppably for hours, sending messages that in two weeks, she could visit Charles Edward in his house. Her mental health deteriorated week by week as she felt suicidal but feared for her unborn child.

In mid-May, Charles Edward finally agreed to a meeting at his house. On the agreed day, 18 May, however, Madame de Guéméné had spies around Charles Edward's house, so the two met briefly in a carriage. He swore that he would not abandon her, making her ecstatic, but also told her that he did not love her “as much as before” and wanted to have another mistress. In response, Louise wrote to her that she would remain faithful to him forever and asked him to see Madame de Talmont less. However, in the coming days, she received no letter from him; Charles Edward continued complaining that Louise was too immature and dependant, looking for a Protestant bride, and buying gifts for Madame de Talmont. To prove her loyalty and courage, Louise decided to regularly visit Charles Edward at his house, despite the danger that her mother-in-law would find out and confine her at home. Around this time, Madame de Guéméné appears to have staged a violent and public fight between herself and Charles Edward, mistaken by contemporaries for a lovers' quarrel, and diverting attention from the real affair.

=== Later life ===
On 28 July 1748, Louise gave birth to her son by Charles Edward, named Charles Godefroi Sophie Jules Marie and acknowledged as the legitimate child of her husband. Madame de Guéméné informed Charles Edward's father of the birth, but not of the child's true paternity. The birth was unremarked by noble society, which usually followed such events with great interest. Louise kept up polite correspondence with her Stuart family.

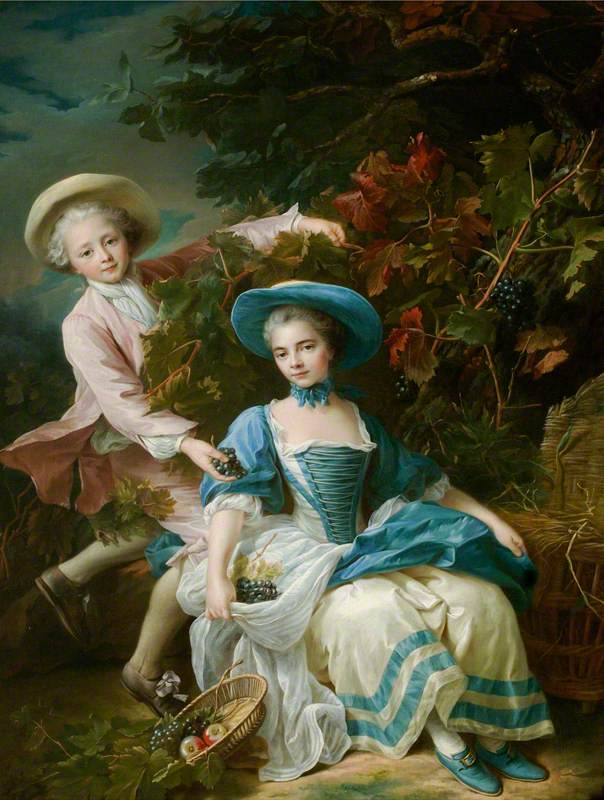
Henri Louis de Rohan, Louise's son, known as the Prince of Guéméné, with his cousin and later wife, Victoire de Rohan, Mademoiselle de Soubise, in 1757, aged twelve.

Little is known of Louise's later life, although she lived for another 33 years. She seems to have lived peacefully and quietly. Her younger son died on 18 January 1749, at the age of five months and 21 days. According to custom, he was not publicly mourned due to his young age, but buried in the Rohan-Guéméné crypt in the convent of the Feuillants (demolished in the 19th century), after a simple service in the family's parish church, the Church of Saint Paul and Saint Louis. It does not appear that Charles Edward was affected by his son's death.

Louise occasionally appeared at the royal court, although less frequently than most women of her rank. After the 1749 death of her husband's maternal grandfather, she was known as the princess of Rohan. Her surviving correspondence shows her to have had a good relationship with her father, her husband, and her mother-in-law. She continued to have a warm and close relationship with her father in particular. She and her husband regularly spent holidays at the Château de Navarre with Louise's father. On 15 January 1761, her only surviving child, sixteen-year-old Henri Louis married his second cousin, Victoire Armande Josèphe de Rohan. Shortly after Louise's death, the couple became infamous for their bankruptcy, having accrued one of the largest debts (33 million livres) of the ancien régime.

Following the 1766 death of Charles Edward's father, Louise and her cousin exchanged formal New Year's greetings and occasional letters on family matters. In May 1772, Charles Edward (nominally Charles III of England) informed Louise of his marriage to Princess Louise of Stolberg-Gedern. In March 1774, he sent her small engraved portraits of himself and his wife.

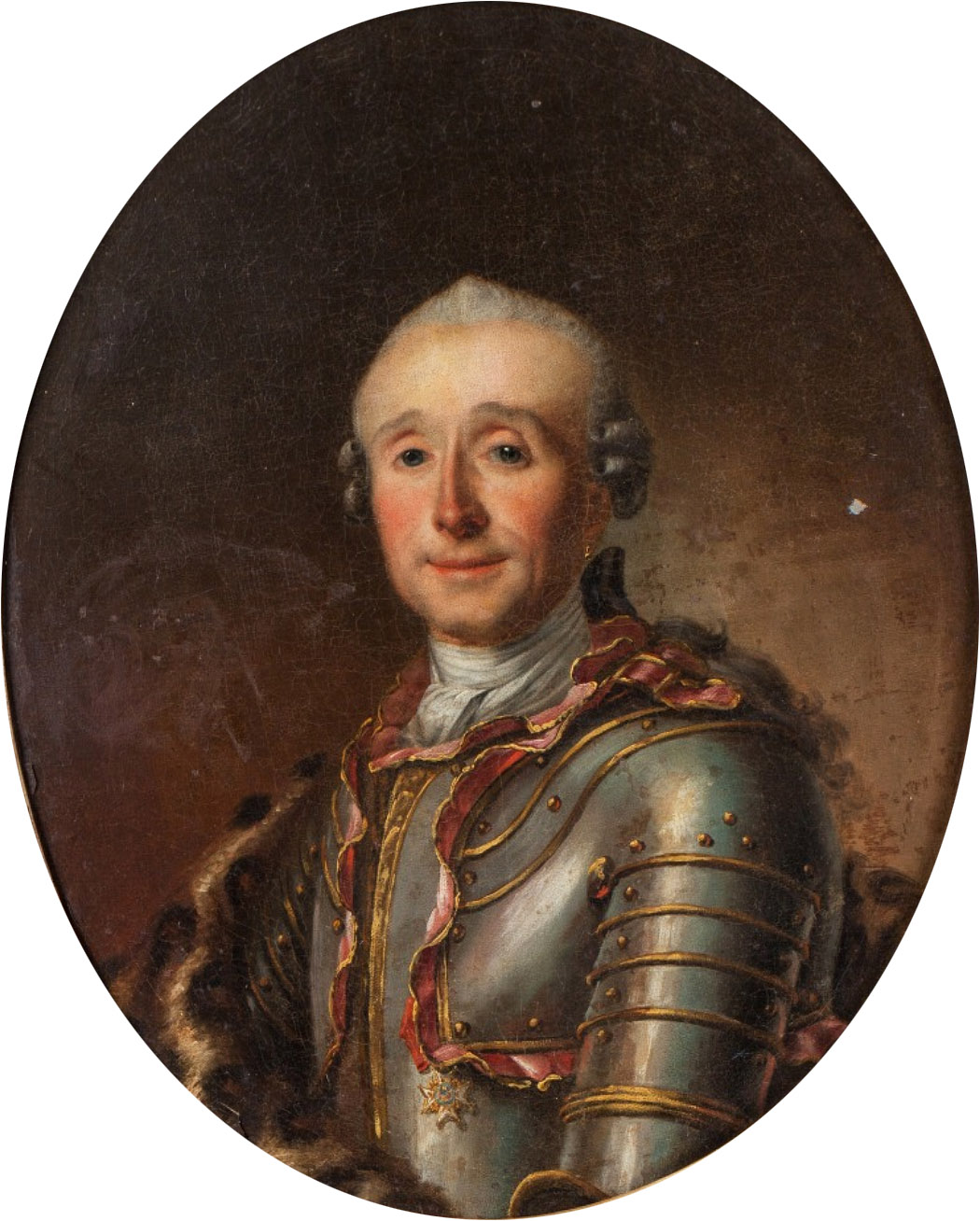
Jules de Rohan, Prince of Rohan, Louise's husband, in 1766.

Louise seems to have spent much of her time with charity work and religious activities. She died on 24 September 1781 (despite a later story that she was beheaded during the revolution). According to her will, she was buried “without any ceremony” in the convent of the Feuillants, next to her infant son. She left 28 000 livres across different parishes as donations to the poor, asking them to pray for her soul, and 60 000 livres to each of her four grandchildren. She promised an additional 90 000 livres to her second eldest grandson if he did not join the clergy, as a way of ensuring the continued existence of the family name. To her brother, she left a box decorated with the portrait of their mother. In addition, she made various bequests of her extensive library and jewel collection, which give the impression that she had a large and trusted group of friends and family around her. An unsigned and undated codicil was amended to the will containing large gifts to various members of the clergy, suggesting that Louise was under the strong influence of a priest in her last days. This codicil was invalid and never carried out.

Her husband died in obscurity on 10 December 1788, in exile on the lands of Louise's brother following his son's disgrace. Her former lover, Charles Edward Stuart had died on 30 January of the same year, in exile in Rome.

It is through Louise that the present princes of Guéméné are pretenders to the Duchy of Bouillon.

== Issue ==
- Henri Louis Marie de Rohan, Duke of Montbazon, Prince of Guéméné (31 August 1745 – 24 April 1809) married Victoire de Rohan and had issue; she was the sister of the Princess of Condé
- Charles Godefroi Sophie Jules Marie de Rohan (28 July 1748 – December 1748) illegitimate child.

== Ancestry ==
Ancestors of Marie Louise de La Tour d'Auvergne

8. Godefroy Maurice de La Tour d'Auvergne
4. Emmanuel Théodose de La Tour d'Auvergne
9. Marie Anne Mancini
2. Charles Godefroy de La Tour d'Auvergne
10. Charles Belgique Hollande de La Trémoille
5. Marie Armande Victoire de La Trémouille
11. Madeleine de Créquy
1. Marie Louise de La Tour d'Auvergne
12. John III Sobieski
6. Jakub Ludwik Sobieski
13. Marie Casimire Louise de La Grange d'Arquien
3. Maria Karolina Sobieska
14. Philipp Wilhelm, Elector Palatine
7. Countess Palatine Hedwig Elisabeth Amelia of Neuburg
15. Landgravine Elisabeth Amalie of Hesse-Darmstadt

== Fiction ==
Louise is a character in the 1992 Diana Gabaldon novel Dragonfly in Amber, and is portrayed by Claire Sermonne in season 2 of the television adaptation, Outlander.

== Bibliography ==
- Bongie, L. L. (1986). The Love of a Prince: Bonnie Prince Charlie in France, 1744–1748. Vancouver: University of British Columbia Press. ISBN 0-7748-0258-8.
- McLynn, Frank (2003). Bonnie Prince Charlie: Charles Edward Stuart. London: Pimlico – via Internet Archive.
