= Prince of Soubise =

Within the French nobility, the title of "Prince of Soubise" was created in 1667 when the sirerie of Soubise, Charente-Maritime was raised to a principality for the cadet branch of the House of Rohan. The first prince was François de Rohan (1630-1712). He was succeeded by three further princes before the male line of Rohan-Soubise became extinct upon the death of the second Duke of Rohan-Rohan, Charles (1715-87).

The Hôtel de Soubise in Paris was owned by the princes, and is now the museum of the French National Archives.

Picture	Name	Father	Birth	Marriage	Became Prince	Ceased to be Prince	Death	Spouse
	François de Rohan, Prince of Soubise	Hercule, Duke of Montbazon (Rohan)	1630	17 April 1663	March 1667; Soubise raised to a principality	24 August 1712		Anne de Rohan-Chabot
	Hercule Mériadec, Duke of Rohan-Rohan	François de Rohan, Prince of Soubise	8 May 1669	15 February 1694; 2 September 1732	24 August 1712 de facto accession	26 January 1749		Anne Geneviève de Lévis; Marie Sophie de Courcillon
	Jules de Rohan, Prince of Soubise	Hercule Mériadec, Duke of Rohan-Rohan	16 January 1697	16 September 1714	24 August 1712 grandfather's death	6 May 1724		Anne Julie de Melun
	Charles de Rohan, Prince of Soubise	Jules de Rohan, Prince of Soubise	16 July 1715	23 December 1745; 29 December 1734; 6 November 1741	6 May 1724	4 July 1787 death		Anne Marie Louise de La Tour d'Auvergne; Princess Anne Thérèse of Savoy-Carignan; Princess Viktoria of Hesse-Rheinfels-Rotenburg
Picture	Name	Father	Birth	Marriage	Became Prince	Ceased to be Prince	Death	Spouse

== See also ==
- Princess of Soubise
