= Charles Jules, Prince of Rochefort =

Charles Jules
- Prince of Rochefort
- Born: 29 August 1729; Paris, France
- Died: 18 May 1811 (aged 81)
- Spouse: Marie Henriette Charlotte d'Orléans-Rothelin
- Issue Detail: Charles Gaspard, Prince of Rochefort; Charlotte Louise, Duchess of Enghien
Names
- Charles Jules Armand de Rohan
- House: House of Rohan
- Father: Charles de Rohan
- Mother: Eléonore Eugénie de Béthisy de Mézières

Charles Jules de Rohan (Charles Jules Armand; 29 August 1729 – 18 May 1811) was a French nobleman and Prince of Rochefort. He was the father of Charlotte Louise de Rohan, secret wife of the executed Duc d'Enghien.

== Biography ==
Born to Charles de Rohan, the Prince of Rochefort, and his wife Eléonore Eugénie de Béthisy de Mézières, he was the second child of four and their eldest son.

His family claimed ancestry from the reigning Dukes of Brittany and at the French court, were allowed the rank of Foreign Prince. This entitled them to the style of Highness and other privileges at court.

Styled as the Prince of Montauban from birth, at the death of his father in February 1766 he became the Prince of Rochefort, which was created a hereditary title in 1728.

He married Marie Henriette Charlotte d'Orléans-Rothelin, daughter of Alexandre d'Orléans, Marquis of Rothelin and Marie-Catherine de Roncherolles. The couple were wed at the Église Saint-Sulpice by contract in Paris on 20 May 1762 and officially on 24 May. The marriage produced five children only one of which went on to have further issue.

His older sister Éléonore married Jean de Merode, son of Jean Philippe de Merode. His younger sister was Madame de Brionne, the famous salon hostess and wife of Louis de Lorraine, Prince of Brionne.

== Issue ==
- Charles Mériadec de Rohan (16 November 1763 – 21 October 1764) died in infancy;
- Charles Louis Gaspard de Rohan, Viscount of Rohan, Prince of Rochefort, Duke of Bouillon (1 November 1765 – 7 March 1843) married Marie Louise Joséphine de Rohan-Montbazon
- Charlotte Louise Dorothée de Rohan (25 October 1767 – 1 May 1841) secretly married Louis Antoine, Duke of Enghien, son of the Duke of Bourbon and his wife; no issue;
- Louis Camille Jules de Rohan (16 April 1770 – executed in Paris, 10 June 1794) known as le prince Jules; never married;
- Clémentine Caroline Henriette de Rohan (26 October 1786 – 7 July 1850) married François Louis de Gaudechart, Marquis de Querrieu.
