= Joseph Louis, Prince of Lorraine-Vaudémont =

Austrian general (1759-1812)

- Vaudémont coat of arms
- Born: 23 June 1759; Paris, France
- Died: 29 March 1812 (aged 52) Szeged, Hungary
- Allegiance: Kingdom of France; Habsburg monarchy Austrian Empire
- Branch: Cavalry
- Rank: General der Kavallerie
- Conflicts: War of the First Coalition; Battle of Jemappes; Battle of Ettlingen; Battle of Neresheim; Battle of Würzburg; Battle of Schliengen; War of the Second Coalition; Battle of Stockach (1799); First Battle of Zurich; Battle of Stockach (1800); Battle of Messkirch; War of the Third Coalition; Battle of Caldiero

Joseph Maria Louis, Prince of Lorraine-Vaudémont (23 June 1759 – 29 March 1812) served as an Austrian general during the French Revolutionary Wars. Born into a noble family in France, he went into exile in 1791 during the French Revolution and offered his services to the Habsburg monarchy. He fought in the Austrian army during the War of the First Coalition, rising in rank from leading a cavalry regiment to commanding a brigade. He led a division during the War of the Second Coalition and the War of the Third Coalition. He died in Hungary in 1812.

== Early life and career ==
Joseph Maria Louis, Prince of Lorraine-Vaudémont was born on 23 June 1759 in Paris, in the Kingdom of France, as the younger son of Louis, Prince of Brionne (1725–1761) by his third wife, Princess Louise of Rohan-Rochefort (1734-1815). By birth, he was member of the House of Guise, cadet line of the House of Lorraine. His older brother was Charles Eugene, Prince of Lambesc (1751–1825) and his sisters were Princess Joséphine of Lorraine (1753–1797) and Princess Anne Charlotte of Lorraine (1755–1786).

In 1778, he married Louise Auguste Elisabeth Marie Colette de Montmorency-Logny (1763-1832), an only daughter of Louis Ernest Gabriel de Montmorency, Prince de Montmorency (1735-1768) and his wife, Margaretha Elisabeth Barbara van Wassenaer (1740-1776). When his father died, his 10-year-old older brother Charles became the head of the family. Sometime after he turned 26-years-old, Charles became the proprietor of the Royal Allemand Dragoon Regiment, a unit recruited from Germans loyal to the French crown. After the outbreak of the French Revolution, Charles, his younger brother Joseph, and the entire Royal Allemand Regiment went into exile. On 1 February 1793, the unit was accepted into Austrian service and in 1798 was named the Lorraine Cuirassier Regiment Nr. 10.

== War of the First Coalition ==
On 7 June 1791, vice president of the Hofkriegsrat Ferdinand Tige announced the appointment of the Prince of Vaudémont as Oberst (colonel) in the Austrian army. Vaudémont was assigned to the Austrian Netherlands under the command of Blasius Columban, Baron von Bender. In February 1792, he was appointed commander of the Coburg Dragoon Regiment Nr. 37. He fought at the Battle of Jemappes on 6 November 1792. At that battle, the regiment was split, with four squadrons assigned to the Center and four squadrons serving with the Reserve. On 8 March 1793, he was promoted to Generalmajor. In early 1795, Vaudémont commanded a heavy cavalry brigade in Gottlieb Friedrich von Schmertzing's division on the lower Rhine River. He transferred to the Army of the Upper Rhine under Dagobert Sigmund von Wurmser.

When Wurmser was sent to northern Italy, the Prince of Vaudémont served under Maximilian Anton Karl, Count Baillet de Latour in the Army of the Upper Rhine as a commander of cuirassiers. During the Rhine campaign of 1796, he led his cavalry at the Battle of Ettlingen on 9 July, the Battle of Neresheim on 11 August, the Battle of Würzburg on 3 September, and the Battle of Schliengen on 24 October. He was promoted Feldmarschall-Leutnant on 1 March 1797 to rank from 20 February 1797. In September 1797, he commanded the Second Meeting of the Imperial and Royal Army camp at Villingen.

== War of the Second Coalition ==
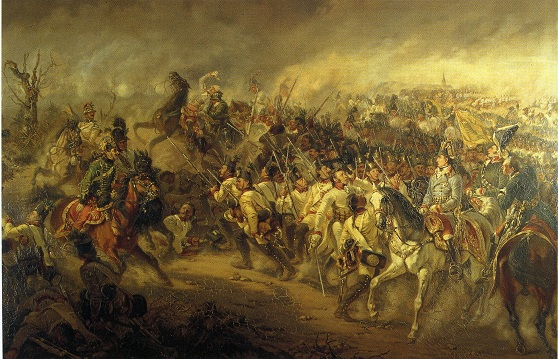
Battle of Stockach, 25 March 1799

In March 1799, the Prince of Vaudémont served in the army of Archduke Charles, Duke of Teschen in Swabia. He commanded a brigade that consisted of the Kaiser Cuirassier Regiment Nr. 1 and the Duke Albert Cuirassier Regiment Nr. 3. He was successful leading his cavalry at the Battle of Stockach on 25 March 1799. He commanded an infantry division at the First Battle of Zurich on 4–7 June 1799. For his good leadership at Zurich, Archduke Charles wrote a letter of commendation to Emperor Francis. At Zurich, Vaudémont's division included two battalions each of the Kaiser Infantry Regiment Nr. 1 and Gemmingen Infantry Regiment Nr. 21, two squadrons of the Waldeck Dragoon Regiment Nr. 7, and one squadron of the Motschlitz Uhlan Regiment Nr. 1.

In the 1800 campaign, Paul Kray commanded the army in Swabia. In the Battles of Stockach and Engen on 3 May 1800, Jean Victor Marie Moreau managed to concentrate 84,000 French troops against 72,000 Austrians. At Engen the main armies fought to a draw, but at Stockach the French massed 20,000 men under Claude Lecourbe against the Prince of Vaudémont's 12,000 Austrians. Lecourbe defeated him and drove the Austrians out of Stockach, capturing its supply base. This event convinced Kray to retreat. Two days later at the Battle of Messkirch the two armies clashed again. Kray posted Vaudémont on his left flank to hold the town of Messkirch supported by strong artillery batteries. A French division led by Joseph Montrichard made a frontal assault but was repulsed. Later, Montrichard's division returned to the attack from the south, together with a second division under Dominique Vandamme that struck from the southeast. Finally, Vaudémont abandoned Messkirch when he was outflanked. Kray withdrew his army to Sigmaringen that night.

== Later career ==
On 7 October 1803, Emperor Francis appointed the Prince of Vaudémont the second inhaber of Kaiser Cuirassier Regiment Nr. 1. In 1805, he commanded a cavalry division in the Army of Italy under Archduke Charles. He fought at the Battle of Caldiero on 29–31 October 1805. His division was made up of the Levenehr Dragoon Regiment Nr. 4 and the Savoy Dragoon Regiment Nr. 5. Each regiment had eight squadrons. He was promoted General der Kavallerie on 22 January 1808. Vaudémont died at Szeged in the Kingdom of Hungary on 29 March 1812.
