= Charles Eugene, Prince of Lambesc =

French prince and general (1751–1825)

Charles Eugène
- Prince of Lambesc; Duke of Elbeuf
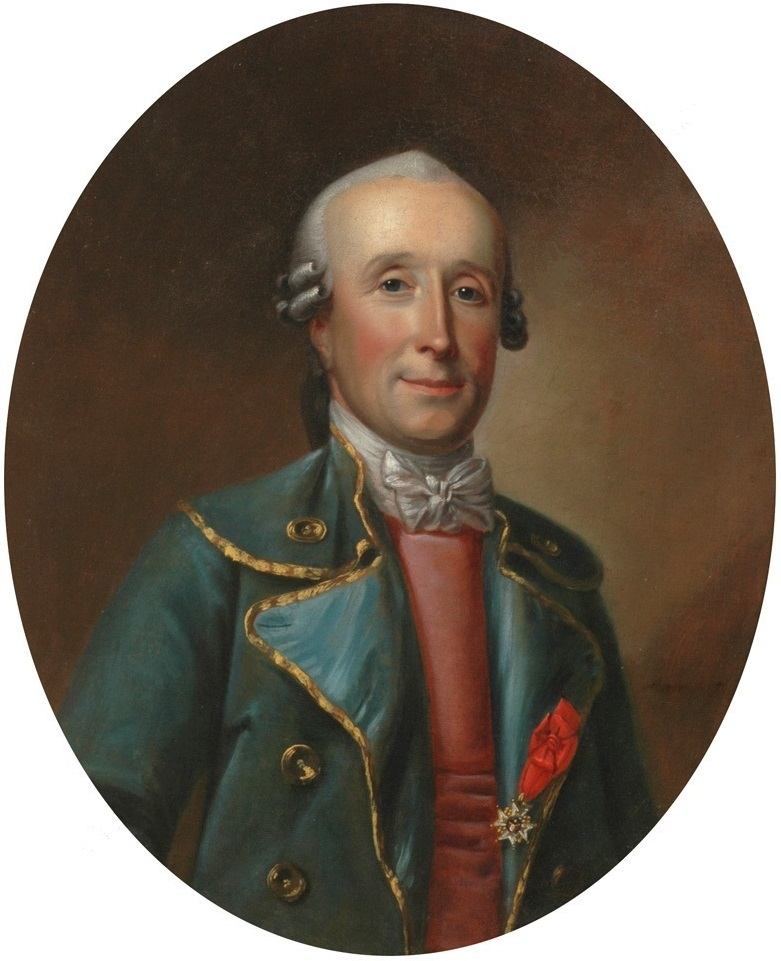
- Born: 25 September 1751; Palace of Versailles, France
- Died: 2 November 1825 (aged 74); Vienna, Austria
Names
- Charles Eugène de Lorraine
- House: House of Lorraine
- Father: Louis de Lorraine
- Mother: Louise-Julie-Constance de Rohan-Rochefort

Military service
- Allegiance: Kingdom of France; Habsburg Monarchy
- Branch/service: Colonel-Proprietor – 5th Chevauxleger Regiment: 20 February 1804 – 10 June 1819
- Years of service: 1788–1815
- Rank: • Grand Equerry for Louis XVI, 1775–1791 • General of Cavalry • Colonel and Proprietor 21st/7th Cuirassier Regiment 22 June 1794 – 21 November 1825 • Captain of the First Arcièren Life Guard: 31 December 1806 – 21 November 1825
- Battles/wars: War of the First Coalition; Battle of Tournai; Battle of Fleurus; Battle of Amberg; Battle of Würzburg; War of the Second Coalition; Battle of Engen

Prince Charles Eugène of Lorraine-Brionne, Duke of Elbeuf (25 September 1751 – 2 November 1825) was the head of and last male member of the House of Guise, the cadet branch of the House of Lorraine which dominated France during the Wars of Religion, remained prominent as princes étrangers at court throughout the ancien régime, and participated in the émigré efforts to restore the Bourbons to the throne. He was an officer in the French and Habsburg militaries during the French Revolutionary and Napoleonic Wars.

== Biography ==
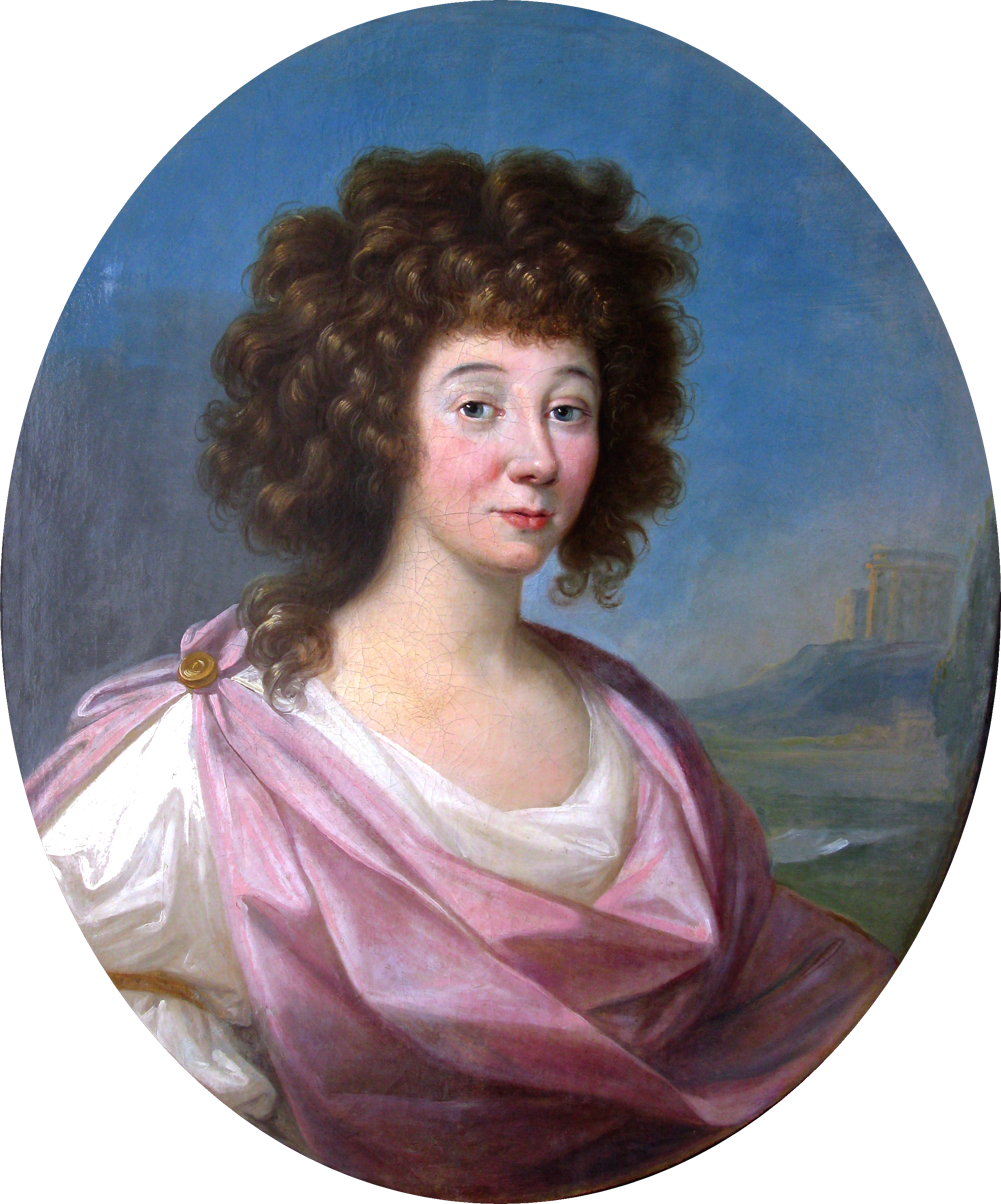
Charles Eugene's first wife, Anna Cetner (Zetzner) by Pietro Labruzzi.

Charles Eugène was born on 25 September 1751 in Versailles, France, to Louis de Lorraine, Prince of Brionne by his third wife, Princess Louise of Rohan-Rochefort. Charles Eugène was a peer of France and Prince of Lorraine, styled as the Prince of Lambesc. One of four children, he had a younger brother, Joseph Louis, Prince of Lorraine-Vaudémont, and two younger sisters, Princess Joséphine of Lorraine and Princess Anne Charlotte of Lorraine. Through Princess Joséphine, who married Victor Amadeus II, Prince of Carignano, Charles Eugène was an uncle of Charles Emmanuel, Prince of Carignano and a great uncle of the future King Charles Albert of Sardinia.

== Marriages ==
He married twice; first to a rich Polish noblewoman, Anna Cetner, whom he wed on 20 May 1803. She was a daughter of Ignacy Cetner, Palatine of Bełz, and Countess Ludwika Potocka. The couple had no issue.

After the death of his first wife, he married again to Victoire de Folliot de Crenneville on 23 Jan 1816. Victoire, the former governess of Empress Marie Louise, was the daughter of French nobleman François Méderic Folliot de Crenneville and Anne Pierrette Charlotte du Poutet. At the time of her marriage to Prince Charles Eugène, Victorie had already been widowed twice: first as Baroness du Poutet and second as Countess von Colloredo-Wallsee. Again, the couple had no children and they divorced in 1817.

== Military career ==
=== French military service ===
The eldest of House of Lothringen-Lambesc served as the King of France's Grand Equerry. Charles Eugène became Colonel and Proprietor (Chief) of the Royal Allemand-Dragoons in 1778 and was promoted to Marshal of the Camp in the French Army on 9 March 1788. He received the Commander's Cross of the Order of Saint Louis.

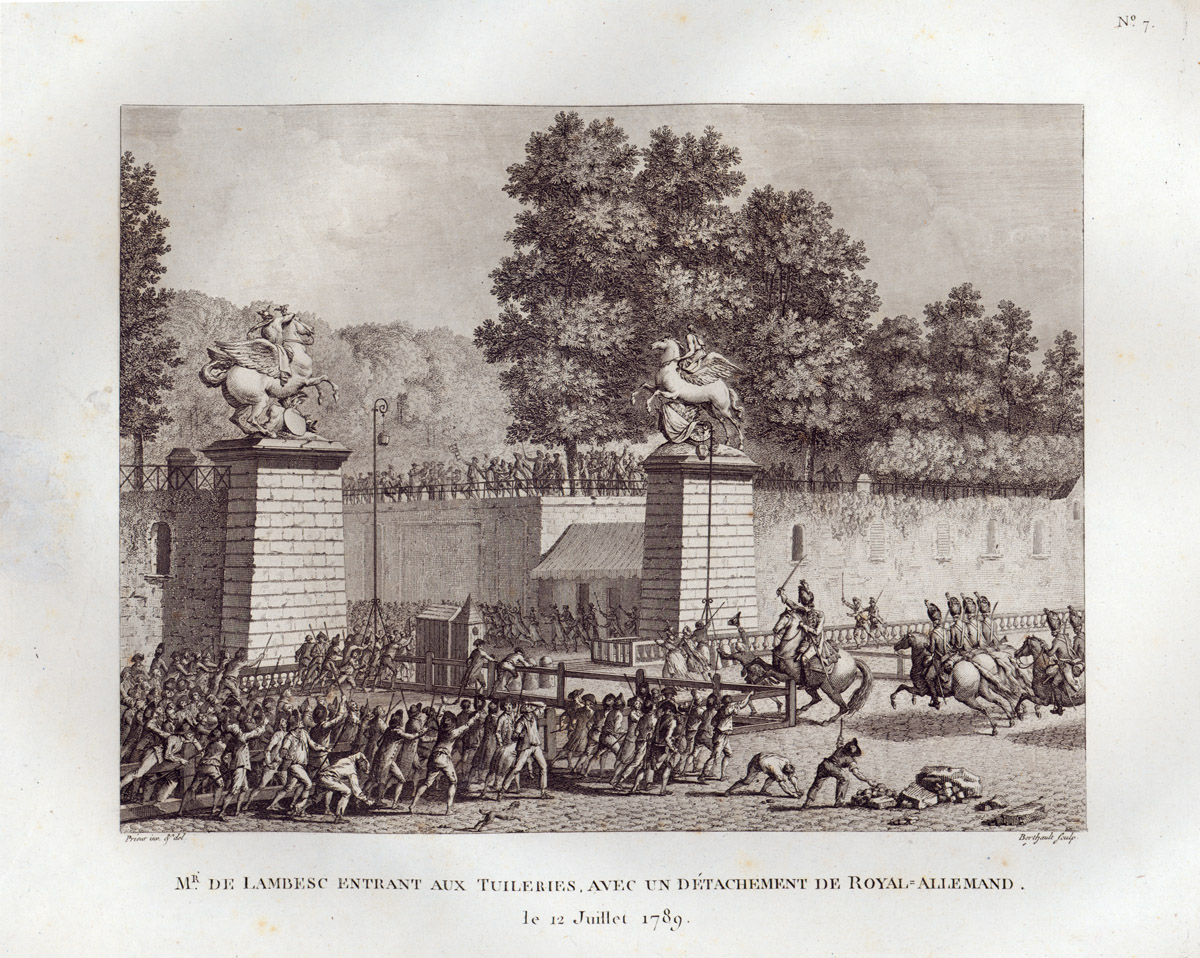
Charles Eugène leading the Allemand Dragoons against the mob, 12 July 1789, Musée de la Révolution française.

In the early days of the French Revolution, Charles Eugène's Allemand Dragoons were an important element in the protection of Louis XVI and his Court. On 12 July 1789, Charles Eugène rode at the head of his dragoons across the Place of Louis XV into the Tuileries Gardens, against a mob that had gathered there and forced the group out of the garden.

In the course of the attack, many were injured, twenty-two protesters died, and Charles Eugène was held popularly responsible, although no charges were filed.

He defended the royal palace in the riot at the Tuileries Gardens in July 1789. Initially, he served in the French army, but at the outset of France's wars with Austria, he picked up the Bourbon cause in Germany.

When hostilities between France and the Habsburgs reached a crisis point in 1791, he left his Allemand Dragoons and followed the Bourbon cause with his younger brother, Joseph Louis, Prince of Lorraine-Vaudémont.

=== Habsburg military service ===
On 18 June 1791, the prince was appointed major general in the Austrian army. In October 1791, he was given command of a brigade composed of the Freikorps (volunteers) "Degelmann" and 37th Dragoon Regiment in Flanders.

On 1 February 1793, his regiment, the 37th Dragoons, was taken into Habsburg service and in 1798, it was united with the 10th Cuirassier Regiment. At the Battle of Tournai on 22 May 1794, he charged the French infantry on the heights of Templeuve with four squadrons (approximately 1,000 men) of the 18th Chevauxleger Regiment "Karaiczay", cutting down 500 men and taking three guns. On 22 June 1794, he was appointed Colonel and Proprietor of the 21st of Cuirassier Regiment in recognition of his actions. In the Battle of Fleurus, on 26 June 1794, he charged with four squadrons of 5th Carabiners Albert to rescue part of Campaign Marshal Prince von Kaunitz's infantry, which had been surrounded by three French cavalry regiments. This unlikely charge against another cavalry force more than five times its size took the French by surprise; the French cavalry scattered, giving Kaunitz time to organize an orderly withdrawal of his own force from the field.

On 4 March 1796, Charles Eugène was promoted to Lieutenant Field Marshal. In 1796 he served in Germany under Field Marshal Dagobert Sigmund von Wurmser in the Army of the Upper Rhine; on 11 May of that year, he was awarded the Commander's Cross of the Military Order of Maria Theresa. He fought with distinction at the Battle of Amberg on 24 August and in the Battle of Würzburg on 2 September, commanding a brigade of cavalry.

In the War of the Second Coalition, the Prince fought in Swabia at the Battle of Engen. After this campaign, the prince was posted to the Habsburg province Galicia, where he was governor general. On 3 December 1806, he was promoted to General of the Cavalry and a few weeks later, captain of the First Arcièren Life Guard.

In Vienna; he was also awarded the Order of the Golden Fleece in 1808.

=== Bourbon Restoration ===
After the restoration of Louis XVIII, prince Charles Eugène was again created a Peer of France. Louis XVIII furthermore created him Duke of Elbeuf and appointed him a Marshal of France. Because of the popular hostility against him in France, relating to the incident in the Tuileries in July 1789, he never exercised these privileges and he died at the age of 74 in Vienna on 21 November 1825. As neither Charles Eugène, nor his younger brother Joseph Louis (who had predeceased him in 1812) had any children, the male line of the old Lorraine lines of Elbœuf, Harcourt, and Armagnac came to an end.

== Honours ==
- Austrian Empire:
  - Commander's Cross of the Military Order of Maria Theresa, 11 May 1796
  - Knight of the Golden Fleece, 1808
- Kingdom of France:
  - Commander's Cross of the Order of Saint Louis, 24 April 1784
  - Knight of the Order of the Holy Spirit, 1 January 1777

== Sources ==
=== Bibliography ===
- (in German) Ebert, Jens-Florian. "Lothringen". Die Österreichischen Generäle 1792–1815. Napoleon Online.DE. Accessed 23 January 2010.
- Smith, Digby. Lothringen-Lambesc. Leopold Kudrna and Digby Smith (compilers). A biographical dictionary of all Austrian Generals in the French Revolutionary and Napoleonic Wars, 1792–1815. The Napoleon Series, Robert Burnham, editor in chief. April 2008 version. Accessed 23 January 2010.
- Spawforth, Antony. Versailles: a biography of a palace. New York: St. Martin's Press, 2008, ISBN 9780312357856
