= Charles, Prince of Rochefort =

Charles
- Prince of Rochefort
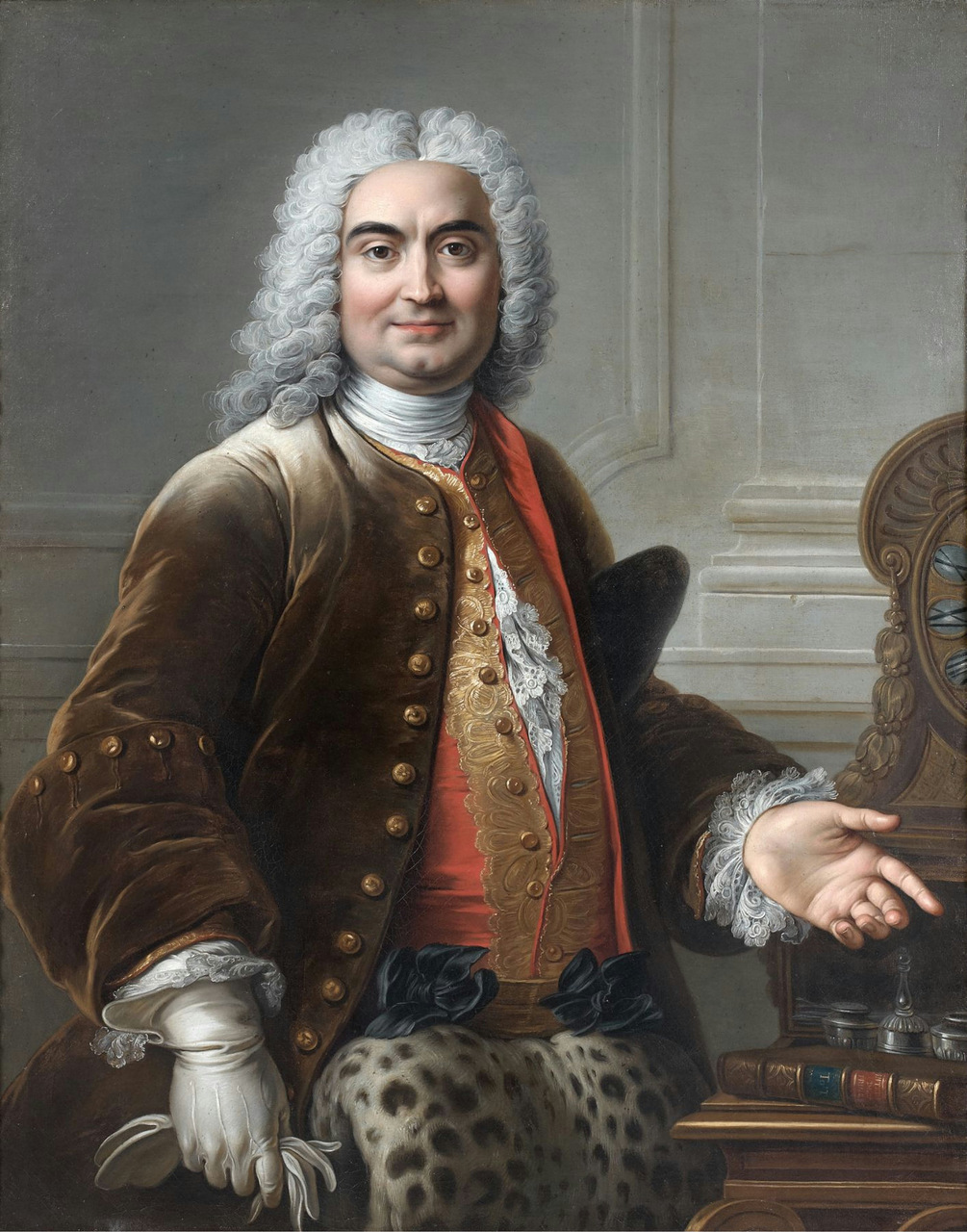
- Born: 7 August 1693; Paris, France
- Died: 25 February 1766 (aged 77)
- Spouse: Eléonore Eugénie de Béthisy de Mézières
- Issue Detail: Éléonore, Marchioness of Westerloo; Charles Jules, Prince of Rochefort; Louise, Princess of Brionne
Names
- Charles de Rohan
- House: Rohan
- Father: Charles de Rohan
- Mother: Charlotte Élisabeth de Cochefilet

Charles de Rohan (7 August 1693 – 25 February 1766) was a Prince of the House of Rohan. He was the founder of the Rochefort line of the Rohans which still continue to live today. He was styled the Prince of Rochefort as well as the Prince of Montauban.

== Biography ==
Born in Paris to the Prince and Princess of Guéméné, he was the couple's fourth child and third son. His older brother Hercule Mériadec, Prince of Guéméné was the senior male line as their older brother François Armand, Prince of Montbazon died without surviving issue to carry on the Guéméné succession.

As he was the younger son, he was given the title of prince de Rochefort, a title which would remain with him till his death. As a member of the House of Rohan he enjoyed the prestigious rank of a Foreign Prince in the early 17th century as the Rohans claimed their ancestry back to the Dukes of Brittany. The title of Prince of Rochefort was created a hereditary title in 1728.

He married Eléonore Eugénie de Béthisy de Mézières, younger daughter of Eugène Marie de Béthisy, Marquis de Mézières, and Eléonore Oglethorpe, like her sisters, a loyal and active Jacobite, who was in turn a daughter of Theophilus Oglethorpe, an English soldier and MP. The couple were married on 23 September 1722 and produced four children.

His eldest son, known as Charles Jules, was the father of Charlotte Louise Dorothée de Rohan, secret wife of Louis Antoine, Duke of Enghien. Charles Jules' son Charles Louis married Marie Louise de Rohan, daughter of Henri Louis, Prince of Guéméné (of the mainline) and Victoire de Rohan (of the middle line). Charles' descendants also claim the Duchy of Bouillon through the marriage of Charles Louis and Marie Louise.

His only daughter, known as Louise, was the wife of the Prince of Brionne, a Prince of Lorraine. Through their daughter Joséphine, who married the Prince of Carignano, the present House of Savoy are direct descendants of Charles and his wife.

Charles died at the age of sixty nine. He was succeeded as head of the Rochefort line by his son, Charles Jules.

== Issue ==
- Éléonore Louise Constance de Rohan, Mademoiselle de Rochefort (15 January 1728 – 1792) married Jean de Merode, son of Jean Philippe de Merode had issue (a daughter who had no further children);
- Charles Jules Armand de Rohan, Prince of Rochefort and of Montauban (29 August 1729 – 18 May 1811) married Marie Henriette Charlotte d'Orléans-Rothelin and had issue;
- Louise Julie Constance de Rohan (28 March 1734 – 20 March 1815) married Louis de Lorraine, Prince of Brionne and had issue;
- Eugène Hercule Camille de Rohan (6 April 1737 – 1816) never married.
