= Victoire de Folliot de Crenneville =

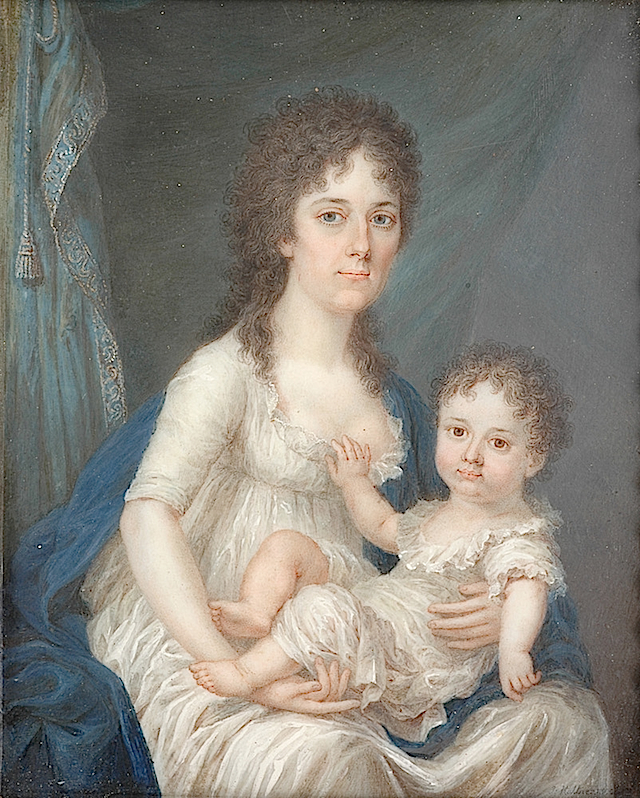
Victoire de Folliot de Crenneville with a baby in her arms

Marie Victoire Pauline Adrienne de Folliot de Crenneville (1766–1845) was an Austrian courtier. She was the royal governess (Aia) of Marie Louise, Empress of the French. She had a great deal of influence over the Austrian affairs of state due to her connections in circa 1792-1806.

== Life ==
She was born to French nobleman François Méderic Folliot de Crenneville (1735-1802) and his wife, Anne Pierrette Charlotte du Poutet (b. 1746). She married three times. First to the French Baron François Charles de Poutet (1743-1790), who was also her cousin. Secondly to the Austrian Count Franz de Paula Karl von Colloredo-Walsee (1736-1806). She married for the third time in 1816 to Charles Eugene, Prince of Lambesc, last surviving member of the House of Guise, cadet branch of the House of Lorraine. She divorced Lambesc in 1817.

She was appointed to the office of Imperial governess to the emperor's eldest daughter Marie Louise, in succession to Countess von Würben und Freudenthal. She was a friend of the State Minister, Thugut, who recommended her to the position. Marie Louise became very devoted to her, and her daughter Victoire de Poutet became the playmate and life long correspondent of Marie Louise from 1799 onward.

Crenneville reportedly aided Colloredo in having minister Schloisnig removed from his position, and getting Thugut in to the cabinet. After the fall of Schloisnig, Colloredo came in a position of power, with state affairs now influenced by "a camarilla of ladies" consisting of the Empress, her mother, and Crenneville, who were referred to by Talleyrand as "the sovereigns of Vienna." The Imperial court and government came to be divided in the view on Napoleon by the Peace Party consisting of Manfredini, Ligne, Thugut and Archduke Charles; and the War Party consisting of Cobenzel, Colloredo, the Empress and Victoire de Folliot de Crenneville. Napoleon referred to her as "the intriguing countess".

When Napoleon attacked and occupied Vienna in 1805, the Emperor and Empress fled to Olmütz with their youngest daughter Leopoldine, while the rest of the imperial children were evacuated to Budapest and then to Galicia under the supervision of Victoire de Folliot de Crenneville. The same year, however, came the fall of Colloredo, and she lost her position in parallel with her spouse. They were both banished to their estates. Marie Louise was allowed to correspond with her after her dismissal.
