= Charlotte Louise de Rohan =

Reputed second wife of Louis Antoine, Duke of Enghien

Charlotte
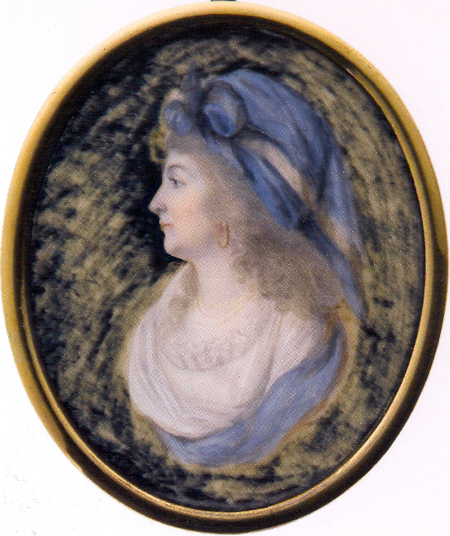
- Charlotte by François-Joseph Desvernois
- Full name: Charlotte Louise Dorothée de Rohan
- Born: 25 October 1767; Paris, France
- Died: 1 May 1841 (aged 73); Paris, France
- Noble family: Rohan
- Spouse: Louis Antoine Henri de Bourbon, Duke of Enghien (m. 1804; died 1804)
- Father: Charles Jules Armand de Rohan
- Mother: Marie Henriette Charlotte d'Orléans-Rothelin

Princess Charlotte Louise Dorothée de Rohan (25 October 1767 – 1 May 1841) is reputed to have been the secret wife of Louis de Bourbon-Condé, Duc d'Enghien, an important prince du sang and émigré during the French Revolution.

== Early life ==
Princess Charlotte de Rohan was born in Paris. Her father was Charles Jules, Prince of Rochefort, a member of the House of Rohan, which held princely rank in France prior to the revolution. Her mother was Marie-Henriette d'Orléans-Rothelin, a descendant of Joan of Arc's ally the Bastard of Orléans, whose legitimate heirs, the Dukes of Orléans-Longueville, died out in 1694 leaving only the Rothelin branch, prominent in the kingdom despite a bar sinister.

== Marriage ==
She is alleged to have privately married the Duc d'Enghien in Baden on 18 February 1804. Before any such marriage was acknowledged publicly, on 21 March 1804 the duke was kidnapped and executed by French troops on the order of Emperor Napoléon, an act which shocked Europe and ultimately extinguished the House of Condé, as he was the only male heir of that cadet branch of the French royal family. Charlotte was never officially recognised as Enghien's widow by the French royal family, neither as émigrés nor during the Bourbon and Orléans restorations, and died in Paris without remarrying at the age of 73.

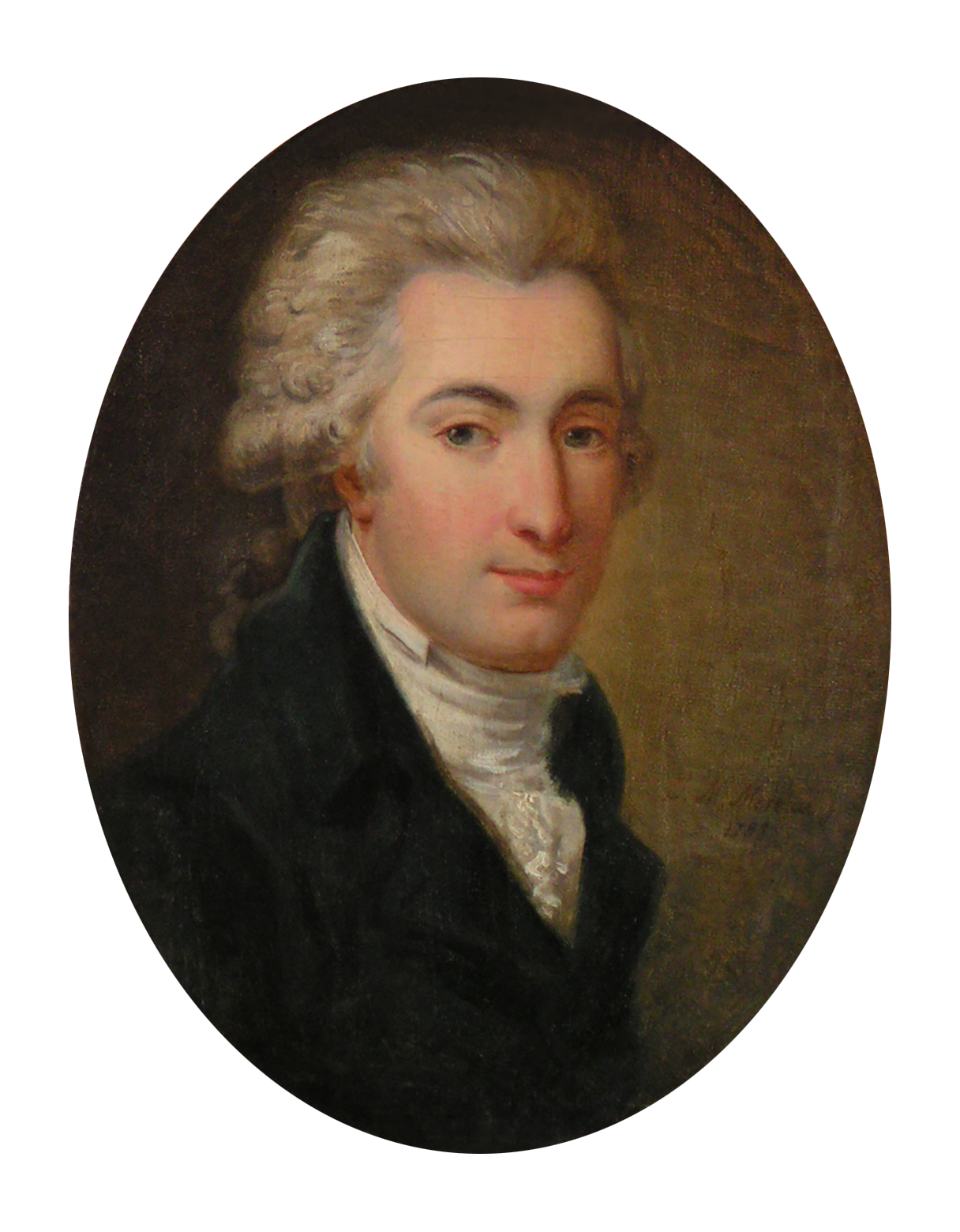
Louis-Antoine Duke of Enghien

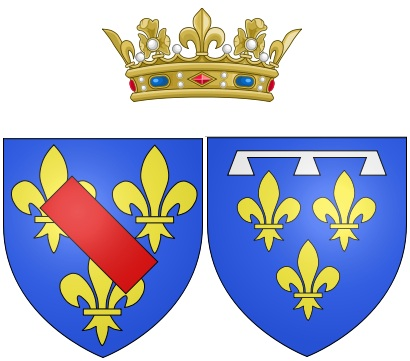
Arms of Bathilde as Duchess of Bourbon, Princess of Condé mother of Louis de Bourbon-Condé, Duc d'Enghien

Arms of the House of Rohan: Gules, nine mascles or

== Relations ==
Charlotte was a niece of the Cardinal de Rohan, whose disgrace in the Affair of the Diamond Necklace helped set the stage for the French Revolution by subjecting the royal family and court to notoriety. She was also related to Victoire de Rohan, Duchesse de Montbazon and Governess of the Children of France during the reign of Louis XVI and Marie Antoinette.

Another Charlotte de Rohan was the paternal grandmother of the Duc d'Enghien, who was distantly related to his alleged wife. In fact, they were 5th cousins once removed, both descending from Hercule de Rohan, Duke of Montbazon.

== Ancestry ==
Ancestors of Charlotte Louise de Rohan

16. Charles de Rohan, Duc de Montbazon
8. Charles de Rohan, Duc de Montbazon
17. Jeanne Armande de Schomberg
4. Charles de Rohan, Prince de Montauban
18. Charles de Cochefilet, Comte de Vauvineux
9. Charlotte Élisabeth de Cochefilet
19. Françoise Angélique Aubéry de Vatan
2. Charles Jules de Rohan, Prince de Rochefort
20. Charles de Béthisy, Seigneur de Mézières
10. Eugène Marie de Béthisy, Marquis de Mézières
21. Anne Perdrier
5. Eléonore Eugénie de Béthisy de Mézières
22. Sir Theophilus Oglethorpe
11. Eléonore Oglethorpe
23. Eleanor Wall
1. Charlotte de Rohan
24. Henri-Auguste d'Orléans-Longueville, Marquis de Rothelin
12. Henri II d'Orleans, Marquis de Rothelin
25. Marie Le Bouteiller de Senlis
6. Alexandre d'Orléans, Marquis de Rothelin
26. Philippe de Montault, Duc de Navailles
13. Gabrielle Eleonore de Montault
27. Susanne de Baudéan
3. Marie Henriette d'Orléans-Rothelin
28. Claude de Roncherolles, Marquis de Pont-Saint-Pierre
14. Michel de Roncherolles
29. Catherine Le Veneur de Tillières
7. Marie-Catherine de Roncherolles
30. Gaspard Erard le Gris
15. Marie Anne Dorothée Erard le Gris, Marquise de Montreuil
31. Anne Dorothée Geneviève du Buat
