= Victor Amadeus, Prince of Carignano =

Victor Amadeus, Prince of Carignano may refer to:

- Victor Amadeus I, Prince of Carignano (1690-1741)
- Victor Amadeus II, Prince of Carignano (1743-1780)
