= Princess Joséphine of Lorraine =

Joséphine
- Princess of Carignano
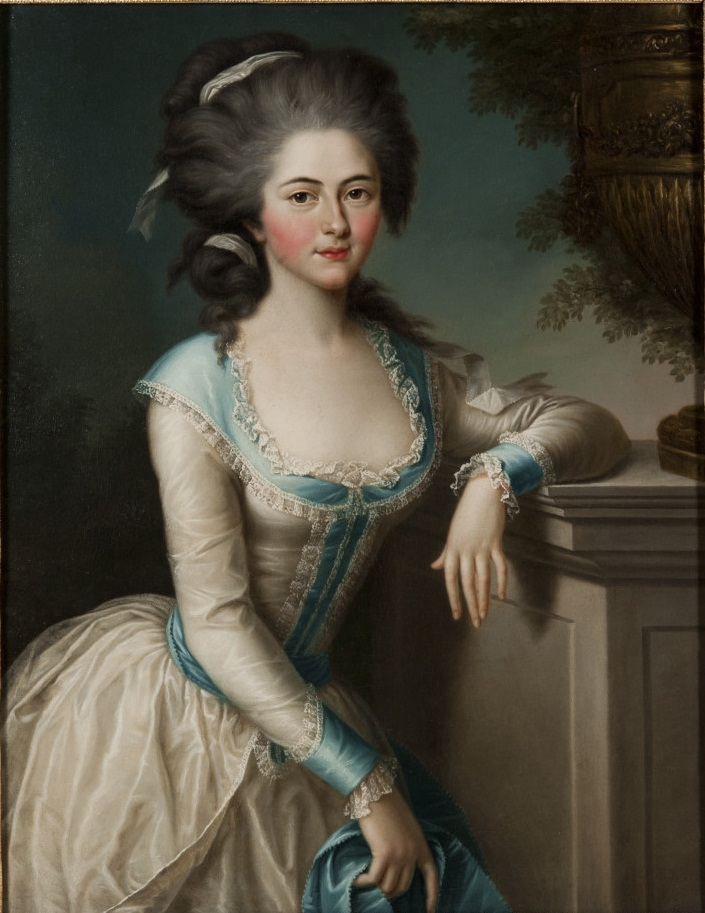
- Portrait by Ludwig Guttenbrunn
- Born: 26 August 1753
- Died: 8 February 1797 (aged 43); Palazzo Carignano, Turin, Italy
- Spouse: Victor Amadeus II, Prince of Carignano (m. 1768; died 1780)
- Issue Detail: Charles Emmanuel, Prince of Carignano
Names
- French: Marie Joséphine Thérèse de Lorraine; Italian: Maria Giuseppina Teresa di Lorena
- House: Lorraine
- Father: Louis of Lorraine, Prince of Brionne
- Mother: Louise de Rohan

Joséphine de Lorraine (Marie Joséphine Thérèse; 26 August 1753 – 8 February 1797) was a princess of the House of Lorraine by birth and Princess of Carignan by virtue of marriage. She was the paternal grandmother of King Charles Albert of Sardinia, from whom the modern royal house of Italy descends.

== Biography ==
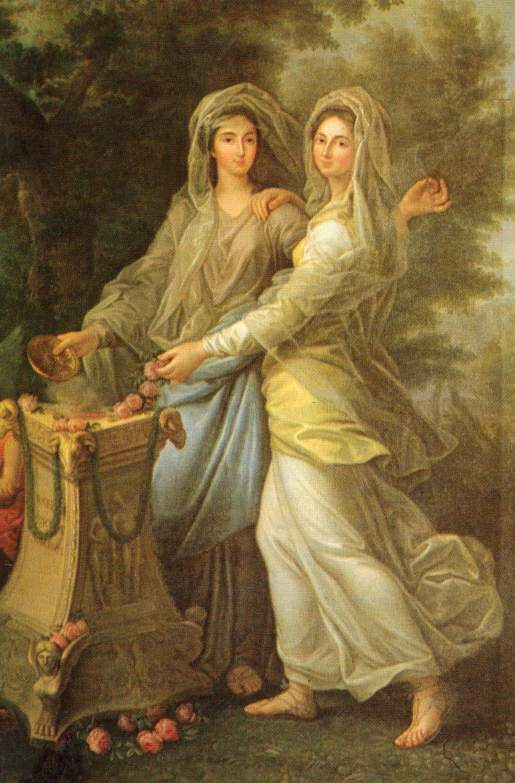
Joséphine with her sister Charlotte, c. 1770

Marie Joséphine Thérèse de Lorraine was the second of four children born to Louis de Lorraine, prince de Brionne, a cadet of the House of Guise, among the most influential families of France's ancien regime. The senior, sovereign branch of the House of Lorraine would merge with the Imperial House of Habsburg during her lifetime through marriage of the last reigning duke, Francis, to Maria Theresa of Austria. Her mother was princess Louise Julie Constance of Rohan (1735-1815), who also belonged to a powerful family of princes étrangers, the House of Rohan. Her brother, Charles Eugène de Lorraine, prince de Lambesc (25 September 1751 – 11 November 1825), escorted his kinswoman Marie Antoinette to France from Vienna in 1770, became Austrian ambassador to France, and would be the last male of the Guise branch of the House of Lorraine.

On 18 October 1768 Joséphine married Prince Victor Amadeus of Savoy, the son and heir of Louis Victor, Prince of Carignan and his German wife, the Landgravine Christine Henriette of Hesse-Rotenburg. Amadeus was also the brother of the princesse de Lamballe, the tragic confidante of Queen Marie Antoinette.

Prince Charles Emmanuel of Savoy was born to Joséphine in Turin on 24 October 1770. She died aged 43 in Turin at the Palazzo Carignano and was buried at Turin Cathedral until 1816, when she was moved to the Basilica of Superga during the reign of Victor Emmanuel I of Sardinia.

== Issue ==
- Prince Charles Emmanuel of Savoy (24 October 1770 – 16 August 1800), Prince of Carignan, married Princess Maria Christina of Saxony and had issue.

== Ancestry ==
Ancestors of Princess Joséphine of Lorraine

8. Henri, Count of Brionne
4. Louis, Prince of Lambesc
9. Marie Madeleine d'Espinay, marquise de Broons
2. Louis, Prince of Brionne
10. Jacques Henri II de Durfort, duc de Duras
5. Jeanne de Durfort, comtesse de Braine
11. Louise Eschalard, dame de Mareuil
1. Princess Joséphine of Lorraine
12. Charles III, Prince of Guéméné
6. Charles, Prince of Rochefort
13. Jeanne Armande de Schomberg, dame de Montaigu-le-Blin
3. Louise de Rohan-Guémené
14. Eugène de Béthisy, marquis de Mézières
7. Éléonore Eugénie de Béthisy de Mézières
15. Eleanor Oglethorpe
