= Louis, Prince of Brionne =

Louis
- Prince of Brionne
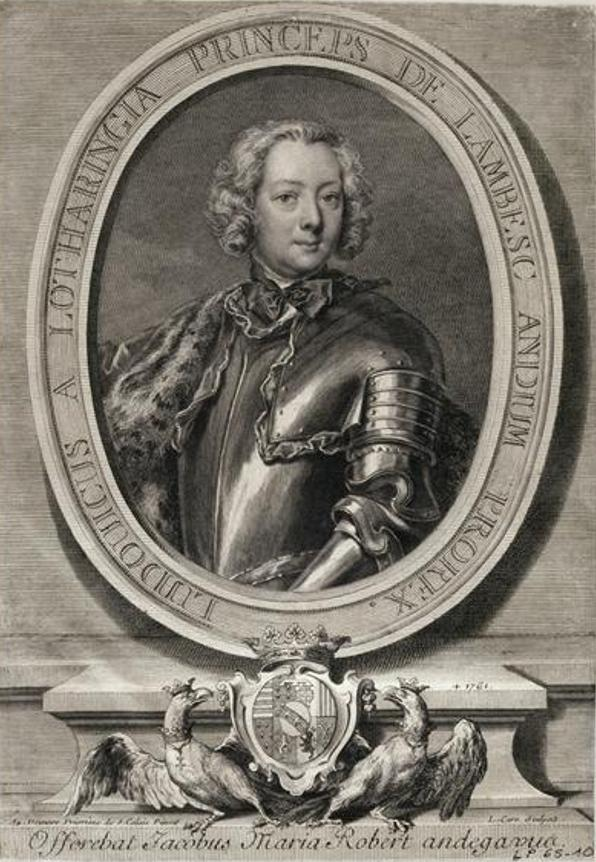
- Engraving of Louis
- Born: 10 September 1725
- Died: 28 June 1761 (aged 35)
- Spouse: Louise Charlotte de Gramont (m. 1740; died 1742) Auguste de Coëtquen (m. 1744; died 1746) Louise Julie Constance de Rohan (m. 1748)
- Issue Detail: Charles Eugène, Prince of Lambesc; Joséphine, Princess of Carignan; Anne Charlotte, Mademoiselle de Brionne; Joseph Louis, Prince of Lorraine-Vaudémont
Names
- Louis Charles de Lorraine
- House: House of Lorraine
- Father: Louis de Lorraine
- Mother: Jeanne Henriette de Durfort

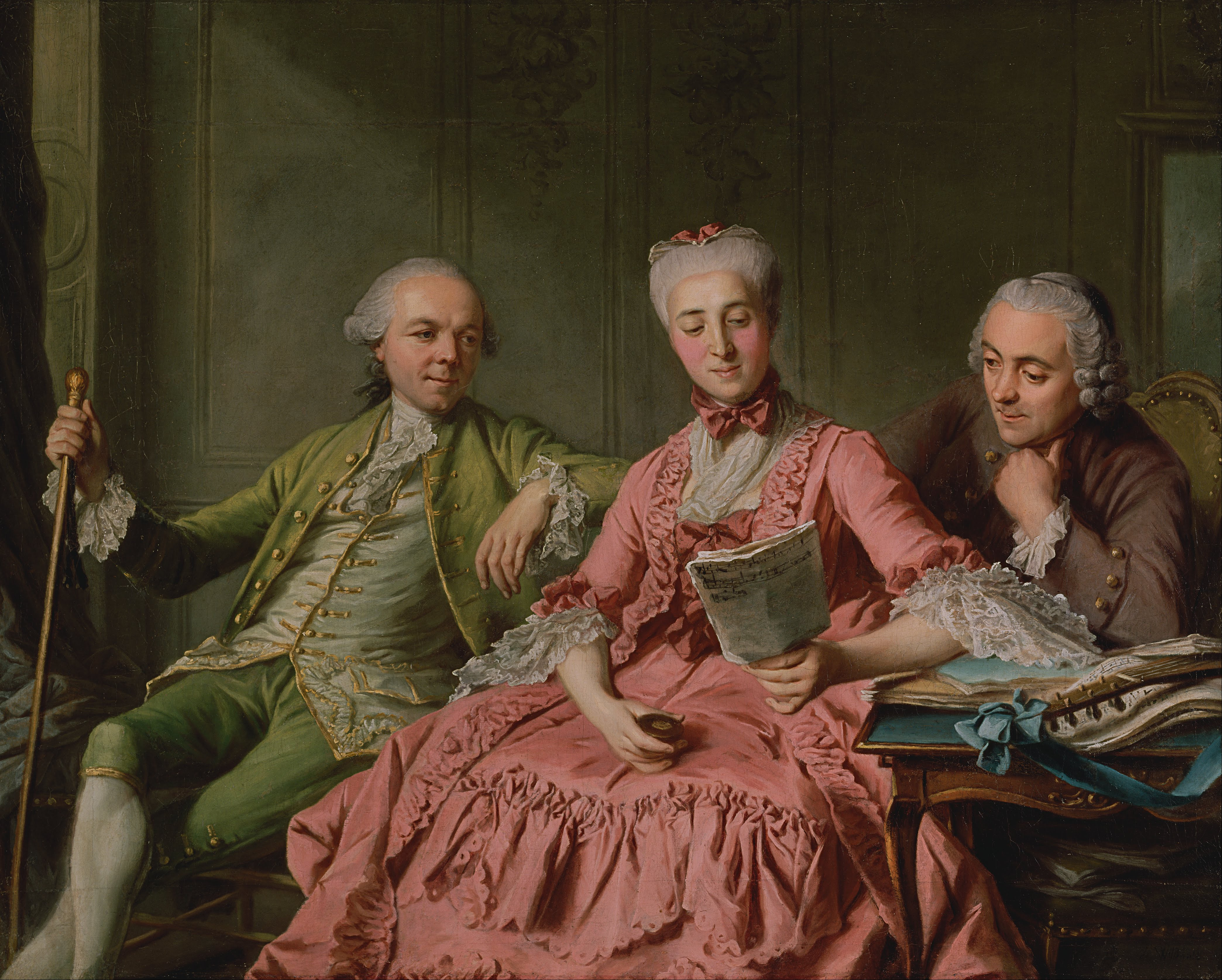
Louis' wife with the duc de Choiseul.

Louis of Lorraine (Louis Charles; 10 September 1725 – 28 June 1761) was a member of the House of Guise, a cadet branch of the House of Lorraine. He married three times and through his daughter, is an ancestor of the present House of Savoy. He was the Grand Squire of France and Governor of Anjou.

== Early life ==
He was born as the fourth child and the first son of Louis de Lorraine, Prince of Lambesc and his wife, Jeanne Henriette Marguerite de Durfort (1691-1750), granddaughter of Jacques Henri de Durfort, Duke of Duras.

=== Military career ===
In 1752 he was created the Grand Squire of France, a post which had been occupied by his distant cousin Charles de Lorraine. The post was one of the Great Officers of the Crown of France and a member of the King's Household. The position was roughly equivalent to the United Kingdom positions of Master of the Horse and the Crown Equerry.

Louis XV made him a Brigadier of the King's Armies in April 1745 and a knight of the Order of the Holy Spirit, the most prestigious knighthoods in France (21 May 1752).

== Marriages and issue ==
On 31 January 1740 he married firstly Louise Charlotte de Gramont, Mademoiselle de Guiche (1725-1742), daughter of Antoine V de Gramont, Duke of Guiche and Marie Christine de Noailles (1672-1748). They didn't have children.

On 29 December 1744 he married for the second time. The bride was Auguste de Coëtquen (1722-1746), his first wife's cousin, daughter of Jules Malo de Coëtquen, Marquis de Coëtquen, Count de Comburg (1698-1727) and his wife, Marie Charlotte Élisabeth de Nicolaÿ (1715-1784). They didn't have children.

On 3 October 1748 he married his third wife, Princess Louise Julie Constance of Rohan (1734–1815), daughter of the Prince of Rochefort. They had:

- Charles Eugène of Lorraine, Prince of Lambesc, Duke of Elbeuf (25 September 1751 – 11 November 1825) married two times, no issue;
- Joséphine of Lorraine (26 August 1753 – 8 February 1797), married Victor Amadeus II, Prince of Carignano
- Anne Charlotte of Lorraine, Mademoiselle de Brionne (11 November 1755 – 22 May 1786) never married; reigning Princess-Abbess of Remiremont
- Joseph Louis, Prince of Lorraine-Vaudémont (23 June 1759 – 29 March 1812); married Louise Auguste Elisabeth Marie Colette de Montmorency-Logny (1763–1832). They had no children.
