= Anne Charlotte of Lorraine-Brionne =

French princess and abbess (1755–1786)

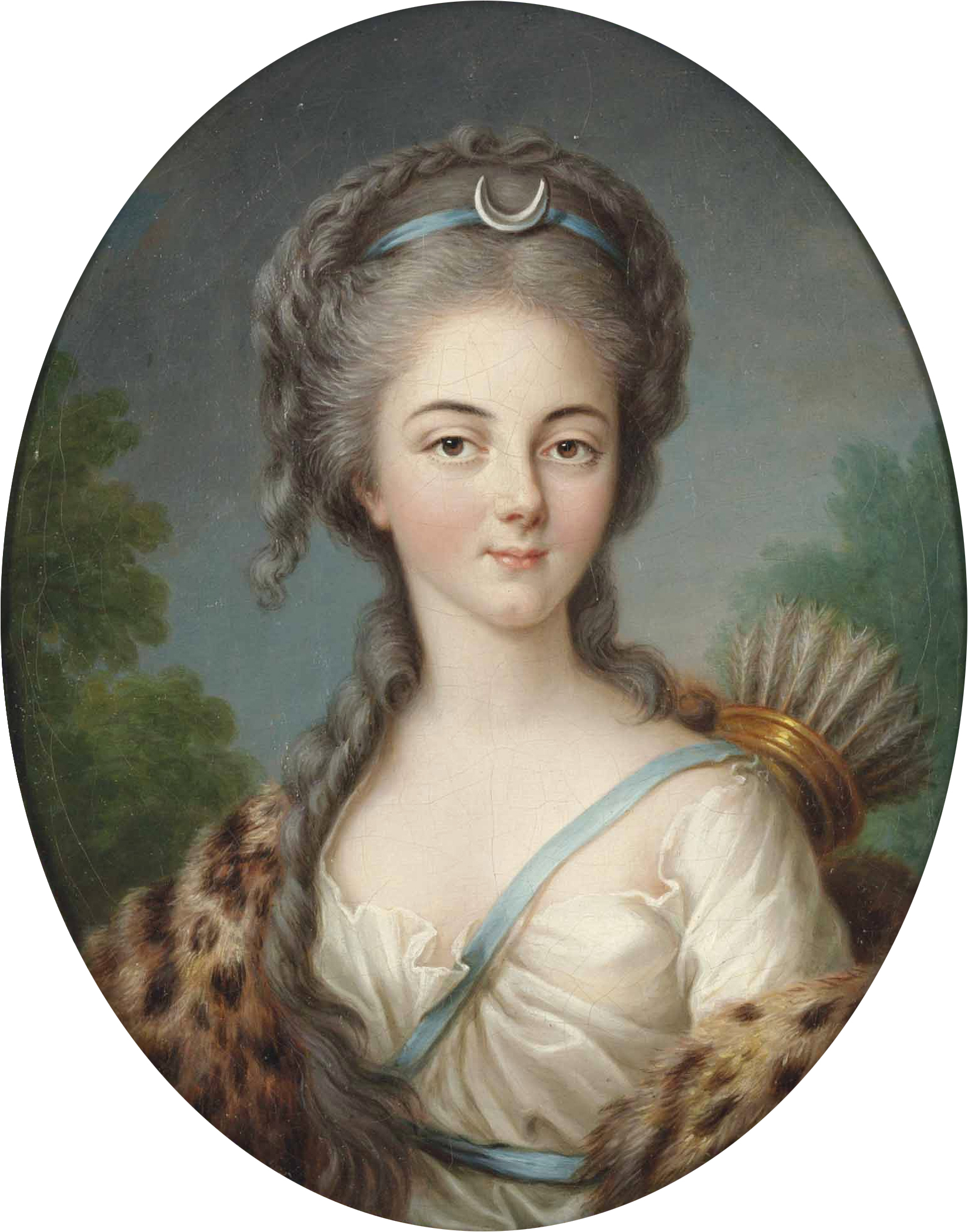
Vigée Le Brun - Anne Charlotte of Lorraine, Mademoiselle de Brionne - National Gallery of Victoria

Princess Anne Charlotte de Lorraine-Brionne (11 November 1755 – 24 May 1786), was an aristocrat, styled at French court as Mademoiselle de Brionne. She was also reigning Princess Abbess of the Imperial Remiremont Abbey in France in 1782–1786.

== Early life ==
Born into a cadet branch of the powerful House of Lorraine, she was the second daughter and third child of Louis de Lorraine, Prince of Lambesc, Count of Brionne and his third wife, Princess Louise Julie Constance of Rohan-Rochefort (1734–1815).

== Reign ==
She was elected Coadjutrice in 1775 and succeeded as Princess-Abbess of Remiremont in 1782. She visited the abbey for the first time in 1784 and rarely after that.
