= Louis Antoine, Duke of Enghien =

French royal (1772–1804)

Louis Antoine de Bourbon
- Duke of Enghien
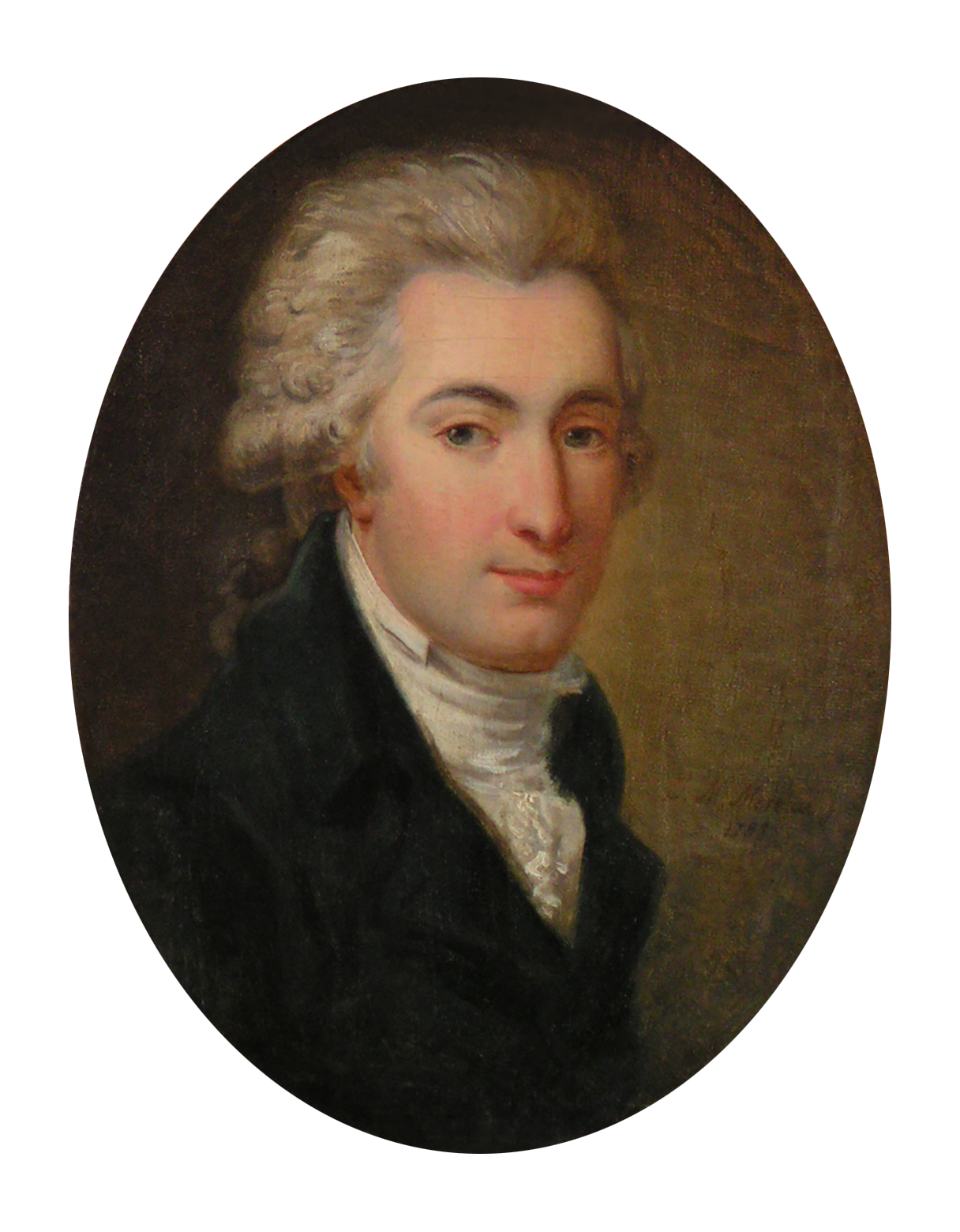
- Born: 2 August 1772; Château de Chantilly, France
- Died: 21 March 1804 (aged 31); Château de Vincennes, France
- Burial: Sainte-Chapelle de Vincennes
- Spouse: Charlotte de Rohan (m. 1804)
Names
- Louis Antoine Henri de Bourbon
- House: Bourbon-Condé
- Father: Louis Henri de Bourbon, Prince de Condė
- Mother: Bathilde d'Orléans

Louis Antoine de Bourbon, Duke of Enghien (duc d'Enghien pronounced [dɑ̃ɡɛ̃]) (Louis Antoine Henri; 2 August 1772 – 21 March 1804) was a member of the House of Bourbon of France. More famous for his death than his life, he was executed by order of Napoleon Bonaparte, who brought charges against him of aiding Britain and plotting against Napoleon.

== Biography ==
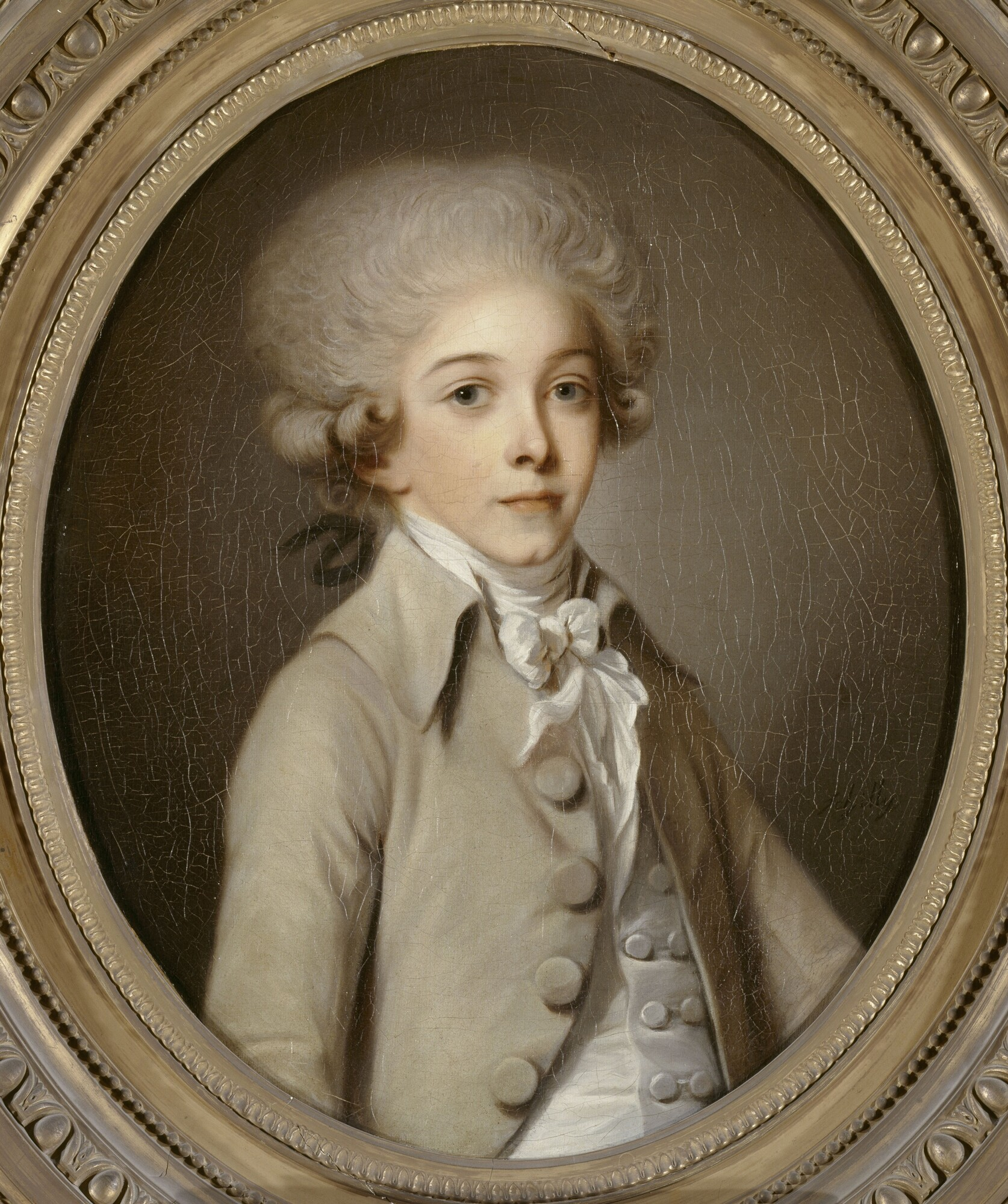
Prince Louis Antoine as a young boy by L. L. Schilly (fourth quarter of the 18th century)

The Duke of Enghien was the only son of Louis Henri de Bourbon and Bathilde d'Orléans. As a member of the reigning House of Bourbon, he was a prince du sang. He was born at the Château de Chantilly, the country residence of the Princes of Condé – a title he was born to inherit. He was given the title duc d'Enghien from birth, his father already being the Duke of Bourbon and the heir of the Prince of Condé, the Duke of Bourbon being the Heir apparent of Condé.

His mother's full name was Louise Marie Thérèse Bathilde d'Orléans; she was the only surviving daughter of Louis Philippe d'Orléans (grandson of the Regent Philippe d'Orléans) and Louise Henriette de Bourbon. His uncle was the future Philippe Égalité and he was thus a first cousin of the future Louis-Philippe I, King of the French. He was also doubly descended from Louis XIV through his legitimated daughters, Mademoiselle de Blois and Mademoiselle de Nantes.

He was an only child, his parents separating in 1778 after his father's romantic involvement with one Marguerite Catherine Michelot, a Paris Opera singer, was discovered; it was his mother who was blamed for her husband's infidelity. Michelot was the mother of Enghien's two illegitimate sisters.

He was educated privately by the Abbé Millot, and in military matters by Commodore de Vinieux. He early on showed the warlike spirit of the House of Condé, and began his military career in 1788. At the outbreak of the French Revolution, he emigrated with his father and grandfather a few days after the Storming of the Bastille, and in exile he would seek to raise forces for the invasion of France and restoration of the monarchy to its pre-revolutionary status.

In 1792, at the outbreak of French Revolutionary Wars, he held a command in the corps of émigrés organized and commanded by his grandfather, the Prince of Condé. This Army of Condé shared in the Duke of Brunswick's unsuccessful invasion of France.

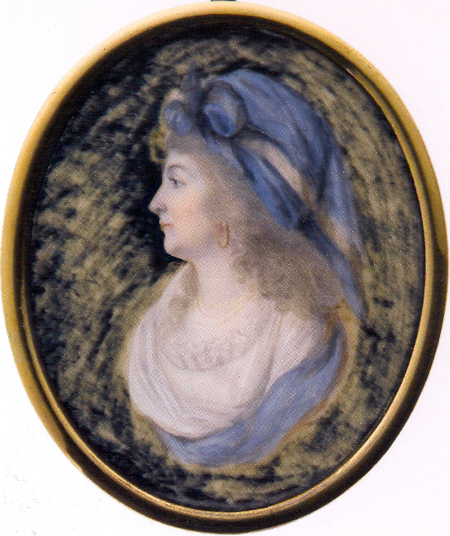
Charlotte Louise de Rohan, Enghien's secret wife; miniature by François-Joseph Desvernois

After this, the young duke continued to serve under his father and grandfather in the Condé army, and, on several occasions, distinguished himself by his bravery and ardour in the vanguard. On the dissolution of that force after the peace of Lunéville (February 1801), he privately married Princess Charlotte de Rohan, niece of the Cardinal de Rohan, and took up his residence at Ettenheim in Baden, near the Rhine.

=== Seizure, trial and death ===
Early in 1804, Napoleon Bonaparte, then First Consul of France, heard news which seemed to connect the young duke with the Cadoudal Affair, a conspiracy which was being tracked by the French police at the time. It involved royalists Jean-Charles Pichegru and Georges Cadoudal who wished to overthrow Bonaparte's regime and reinstate the monarchy. The news ran that the duke was in company with Charles François Dumouriez and had made secret journeys into France. This was false; there is no evidence that the duke had dealings with either Cadoudal or Pichegru. However, the duke had previously been condemned in absentia for having fought against the French Republic in the Armée des Émigrés. Napoleon gave orders for the seizure of the duke.

French dragoons crossed the Rhine secretly, surrounded his house and brought him to Strasbourg (15 March 1804), and thence to the Château de Vincennes, near Paris, where a military commission of French colonels presided over by General Pierre-Augustin Hulin was hastily convened to try him. The duke was charged chiefly with bearing arms against France in the late war, and with intending to take part in the new coalition then proposed against France.

The military commission, presided over by Hulin, drew up the act of condemnation, being incited thereto by orders from Anne Jean Marie René Savary, who had come charged with instructions to kill the duke. Savary prevented any chance of an interview between the condemned and the First Consul, and, on 21 March, the duke was shot in the moat of the castle, near a grave which had already been prepared. A platoon of the Gendarmes d'élite was in charge of the execution. His last words were "I must die then at the hands of Frenchmen!"

In 1816, his remains were exhumed and placed in the Holy Chapel of the Château de Vincennes.

==== Impact of death ====
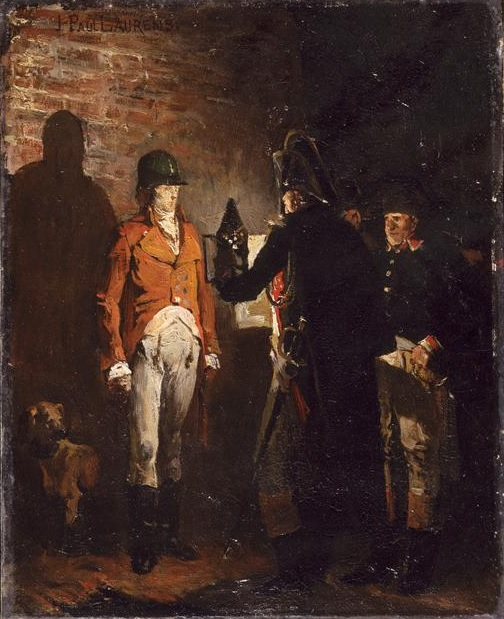
Execution of the Duke of Enghien by Jean-Paul Laurens

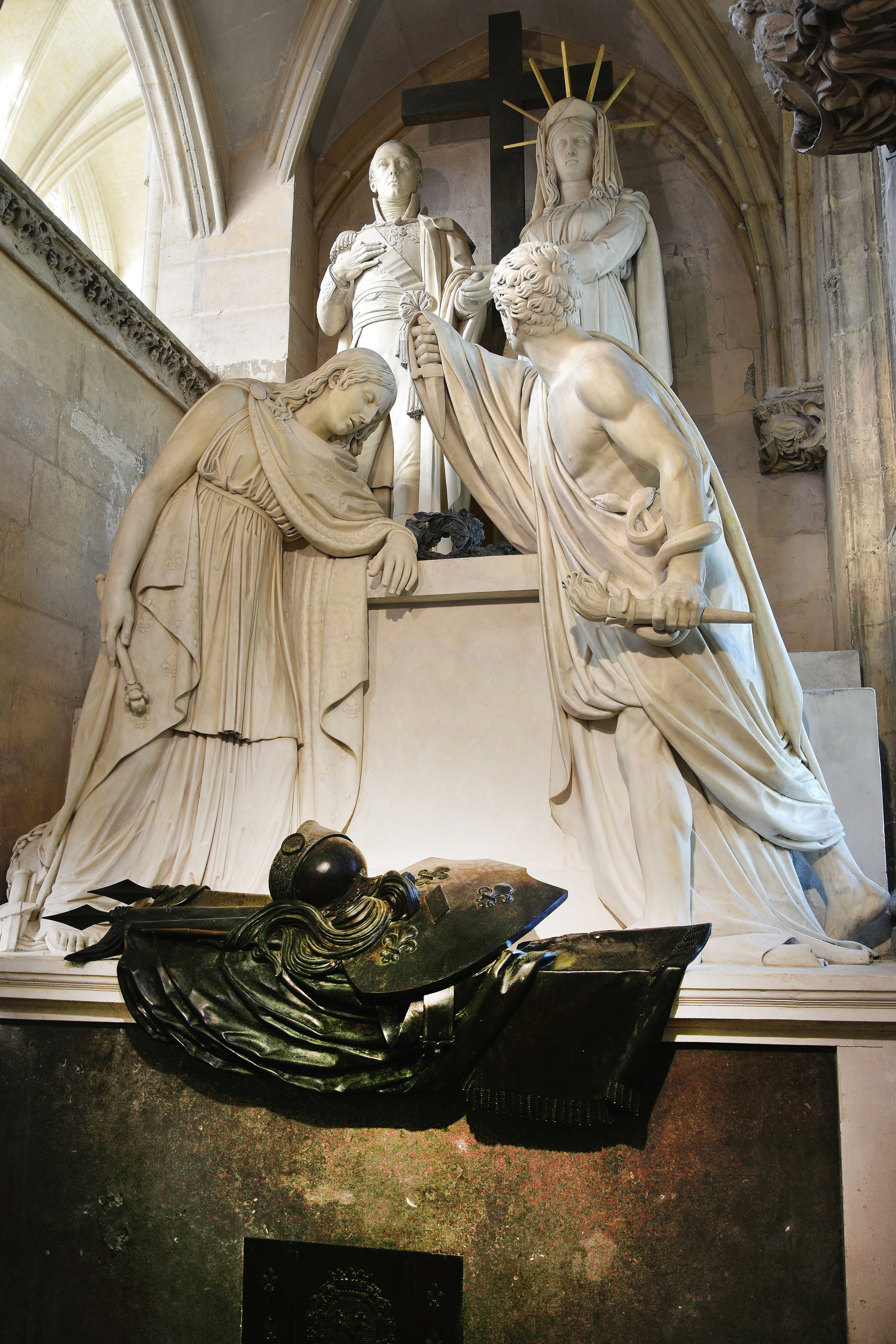
His tomb by Louis Pierre Deseine in the castle of Vincennes

Royalty across Europe were shocked and dismayed at the duke's death. Tsar Alexander I of Russia was especially alarmed, and decided to curb Napoleon's power. "Baden was the territory of the tsar's father-in-law, and the German principalities were part of the Holy Roman Empire of which Russia was a guarantor."

Enghien was the last descendant of the House of Condé; his grandfather and father survived him, but died without producing further heirs. It is now known that Joséphine and Madame de Rémusat had begged Bonaparte to spare the duke, but nothing would bend his will. Whether Talleyrand, Fouché or Savary bore responsibility for the seizure of the duke is debatable, as at times Napoleon was known to claim Talleyrand conceived the idea, while at other times he took full responsibility himself. On his way to St. Helena and at Longwood, Napoleon asserted that, in the same circumstances, he would do the same again; he inserted a similar declaration in his will, stating that "[I]t was necessary for the safety, interest, and the honour of the French people when the Comte d'Artois, by his own confession, was supporting sixty assassins at Paris."

The execution shocked the aristocracy of Europe, who still remembered the bloodletting of the Revolution. Either Antoine Boulay, comte de la Meurthe (deputy from Meurthe in the Corps législatif) or Napoleon's chief of police, Fouché, said about his execution "C'est pire qu'un crime, c'est une faute", a statement often rendered in English as "It was worse than a crime; it was a blunder." The statement is also sometimes attributed to Talleyrand. In the 1844 essay, "Experience", Emerson misattributes the line to Napoleon himself.

In contrast, in France the execution appeared to quiet domestic resistance to Napoleon, who soon set up a military dictatorship by crowning himself Emperor of the French. Cadoudal, dismayed at the news of Napoleon's proclamation, reputedly exclaimed, "We wanted to make a king, but we made an emperor".

== Cultural references ==
=== Tolstoy ===
The killing of d'Enghien is discussed in the opening book of Leo Tolstoy's War and Peace. The vicomte de Mortemart, a French émigré who supposedly knew the duke personally, is the focus of attention of the Russian aristocrats gathered at Anna Pavlovna Sherer's home:

The group about Mortemart immediately began discussing the murder of the duc d'Enghien. "After the murder of the Duc, even the most partial ceased to regard [Buonaparte] as a hero. If to some people he ever was a hero, after the murder of the duc there was one martyr more in heaven and one hero less on earth." The vicomte said that the duc d'Enghien had perished by his own magnanimity, and that there were particular reasons for Buonaparte's hatred of him.(...)

It was an anecdote, then current, to the effect that the duc d'Enghien had gone secretly to Paris to visit Mademoiselle George; that at her house he came upon Bonaparte, who also enjoyed the famous actress' favors, and that in his presence Napoleon happened to fall into one of the fainting fits to which he was subject, and was thus at the Duc's mercy. The latter spared him, and this magnanimity Bonaparte subsequently repaid by death. The story was very pretty and interesting, especially at the point where the rivals suddenly recognized one another; and the ladies looked agitated.

The actress Marguerite-Joséphine Wiemer, known as "Mademoiselle George", was indeed Napoleon's mistress, but there is no evidence that Enghien had anything to do with her, or that the story preserved to posterity by Tolstoy's masterpiece was anything more than one of the pieces of gossip and conspiracy theories current around Europe at the time.

=== Dumas ===
Enghien's death is referenced in The Knight of Sainte-Hermine by Alexandre Dumas. For example:

[T]he dominant sentiment in Bonaparte's mind at that moment was neither fear nor vengeance, but rather the desire for all of France to realise that Bourbon blood, so sacred to Royalist partisans, was no more sacred to him than the blood of any other citizen in the Republic.

"Well, then", asked Cambacérès, "what have you decided?"

"It's simple", said Bonaparte. "We shall kidnap the Duc d'Enghien and be done with it."

His death was also briefly mentioned in The Count of Monte Cristo:

'There wasn't any trouble over treaties when it was a question of shooting the poor Duc d'Enghien' "

=== Film ===
La mort du duc d'Enghien en 1804 (1909) was a one-reel silent film directed by Albert Capellani.

The execution of Enghien is shown in the director's cut of Ridley Scott's Napoleon (2023), where he is portrayed by Ed Eales White. The scene deviates from history by showing him executed by firing squad in the woods, immediately and without trial.

== Ancestry ==
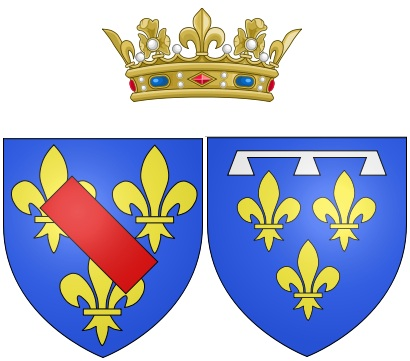
Arms of Bathilde as Duchess of Bourbon, Princess of Condé mother of Louis de Bourbon-Condé, Duc d'Enghien

Arms of the House of Rohan: Gules, nine mascles or

Ancestors of Louis Antoine, Duke of Enghien

8. Louis Henri, Duke of Bourbon
4. Louis Joseph, Prince of Condé
9. Caroline of Hesse-Rotenburg
2. Louis Henri, Prince of Condé
10. Charles de Rohan, Prince of Soubise
5. Charlotte de Rohan
11. Anne Marie Louise de La Tour d'Auvergne
1. Louis Antoine, Duke of Enghien
12. Louis, Duke of Orléans
6. Louis Philippe I, Duke of Orléans
13. Auguste of Baden-Baden
3. Bathilde of Orléans
14. Louis Armand II, Prince of Conti
7. Louise Henriette de Bourbon
15. Louise Élisabeth de Bourbon

== References and notes ==
- Charles Esdaile (2009). Napoleon's Wars: An International History. Penguin. pp. 190–93. ISBN 9781101464373.
- David Nicholls (1999). Napoleon: A Biographical Companion. ABC-CLIO. pp. 94–95.
- Schroeder, Paul W. The Transformation of European Politics 1763-1848 (1996), pp 248–51
